= Oregon City Municipal Elevator =

- U.S. National Register of Historic Places
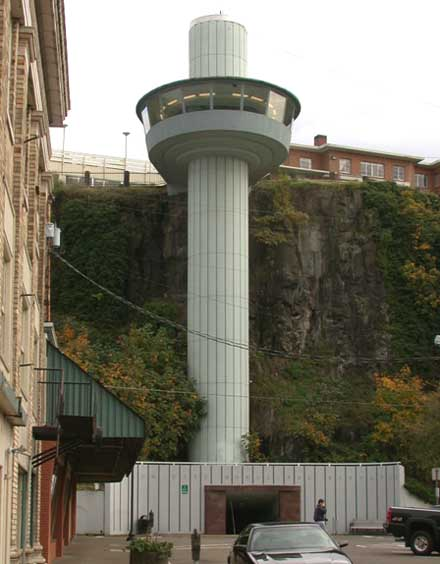

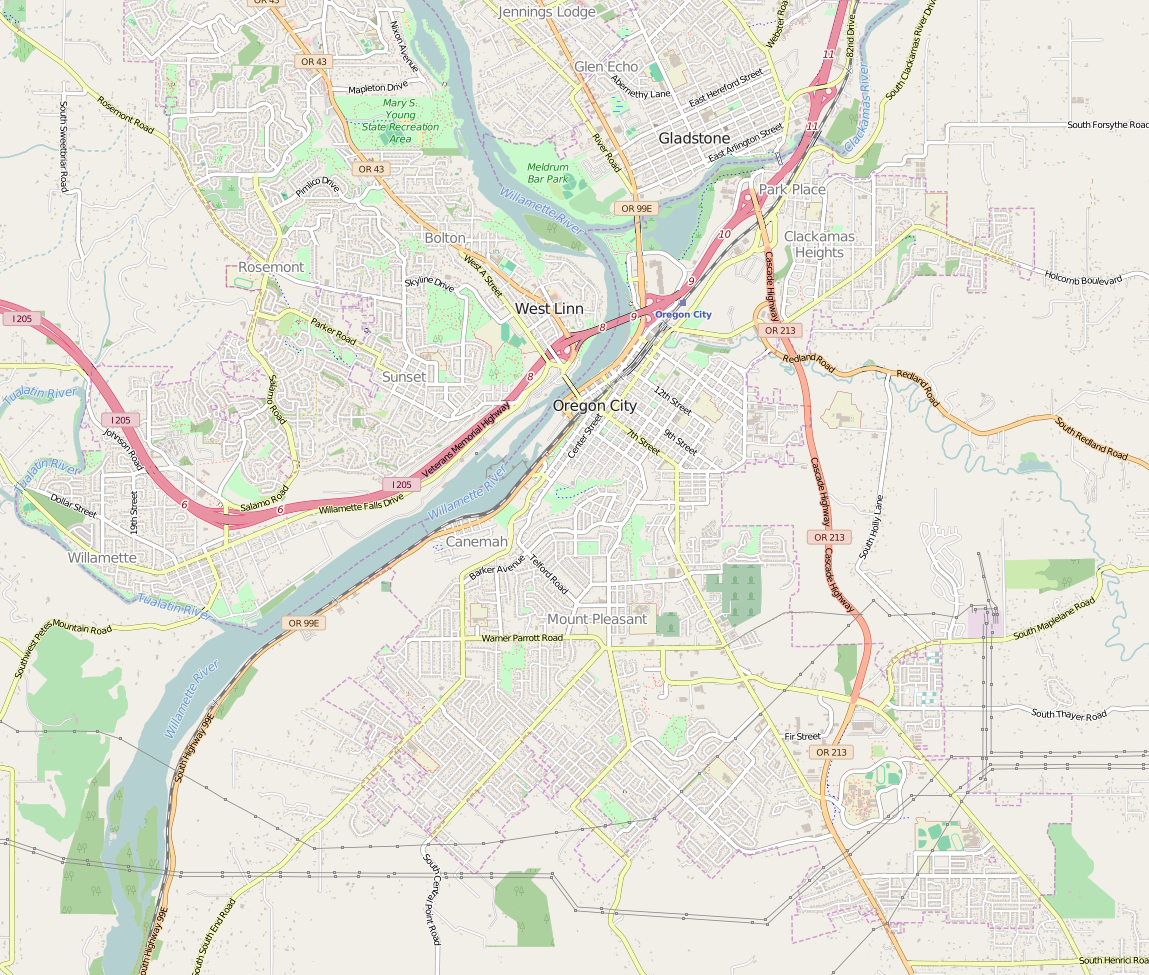
- Location within Oregon City OR Location within Oregon Location within the United States
- Location: 610 Bluff Street; Oregon City, Oregon
- Coordinates: 45°21′24.9″N 122°36′27.7″W
- Built: 1955
- Built by: Otis Elevator Company
- Architect: Gordon E. Trapp
- NRHP reference No.: 14000181
- Added to NRHP: May 15, 2014

The Oregon City Municipal Elevator is a 130-foot (40 m) elevator which connects two neighborhoods in Oregon City in the U.S. state of Oregon. The upper portion contains an observation deck which accounts for its flying saucer appearance.

There have been two elevators at this location. The current elevator was built in 1954–55, and it was added to the National Register of Historic Places in 2014.

== Geography of Oregon City ==
The city of Oregon City includes dramatic changes in elevation. The city's central business district is sandwiched between the Willamette River and a basalt cliff, and is only several blocks wide. At the top of the 90-foot (27 m) cliff lies another neighborhood. Indian trails negotiating the cliffside were used originally to connect the two areas beginning with the founding of the town in 1829. Numerous stairways were built in the mid-1860s, but a better transportation solution was needed.

== Initial elevator ==
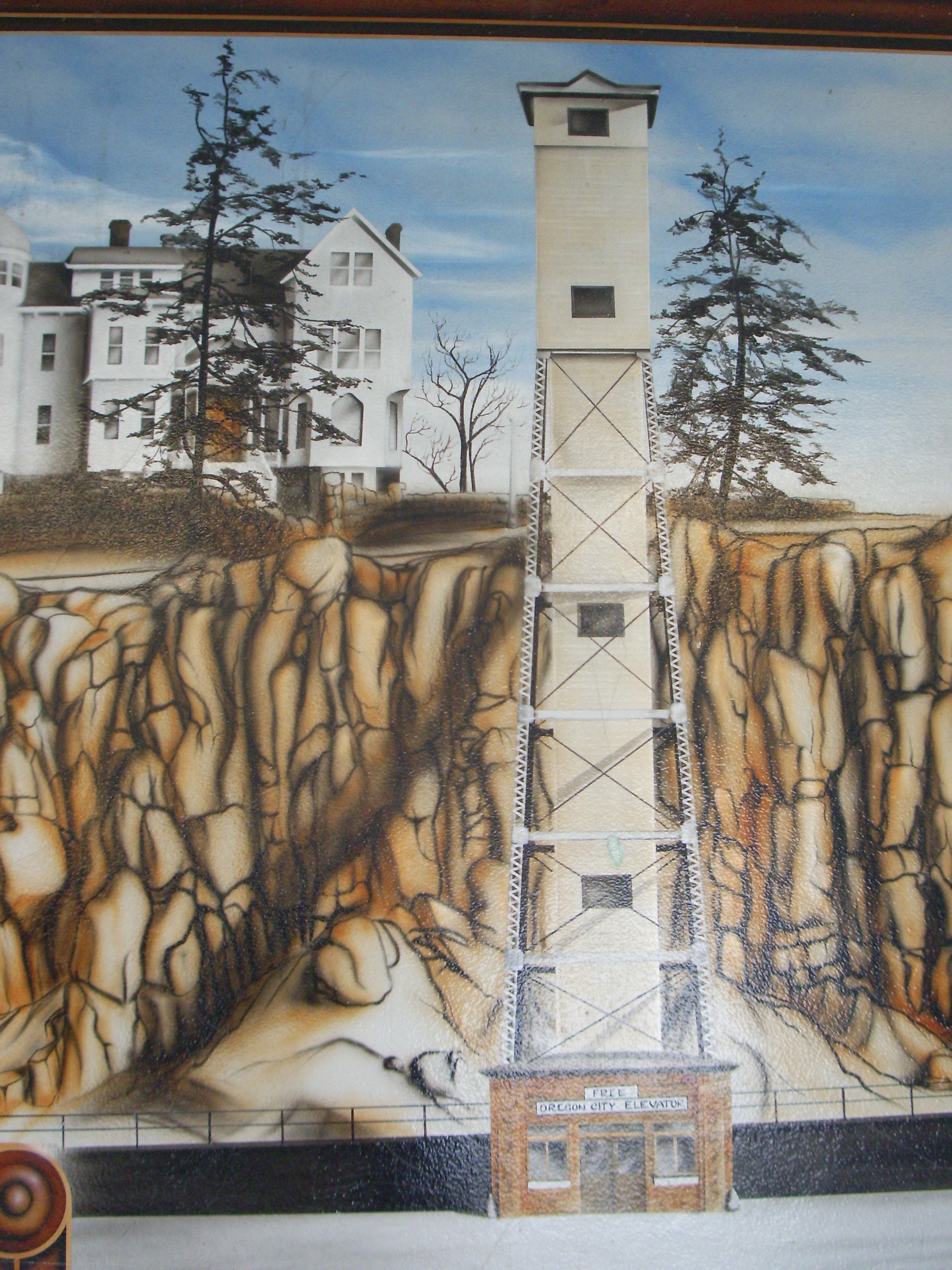
Depiction of original Oregon City elevator

The original elevator that was constructed in this area was built as a means of transportation for the residents in the city. The alternative option before the build, would have been walking the stairs from the base to the top of the cliff which consisted of 722 steps. The first bond issued "A public elevator at the bluff". A bond measure to raise $12,000 for construction was put to voters in July 1912. This levy failed, but a second referendum passed in December of the same year. Sara Chase was the owner of the planned building site, but refused to give up her property for the elevator. After the city went through the Oregon Supreme Court, it was ruled that they could create a right-of-way to the elevator. She agreed to give up a narrow portion of her land. The elevator opened to the public in 1915, delayed by politics. The original elevator was water-powered and took three minutes for the ride. The elevator took three years to build and was constructed out of wood and steel. In the event that the elevator stopped working during the ride, passengers would have to exit through a trap door that had a narrow ladder where the passengers would climb down to safety. Located at the top of the elevator was a catwalk that extended 35 feet (11 m) stretching across and connecting the elevator to the cliffside. The elevator was so popular that most of the cliffside stairs were removed. The elevator was converted to electric drive in 1924, which reduced the time to 30 seconds. After many years of use, in the 1950s it was decided that the elevator would be replaced with a new one.

== Current elevator ==
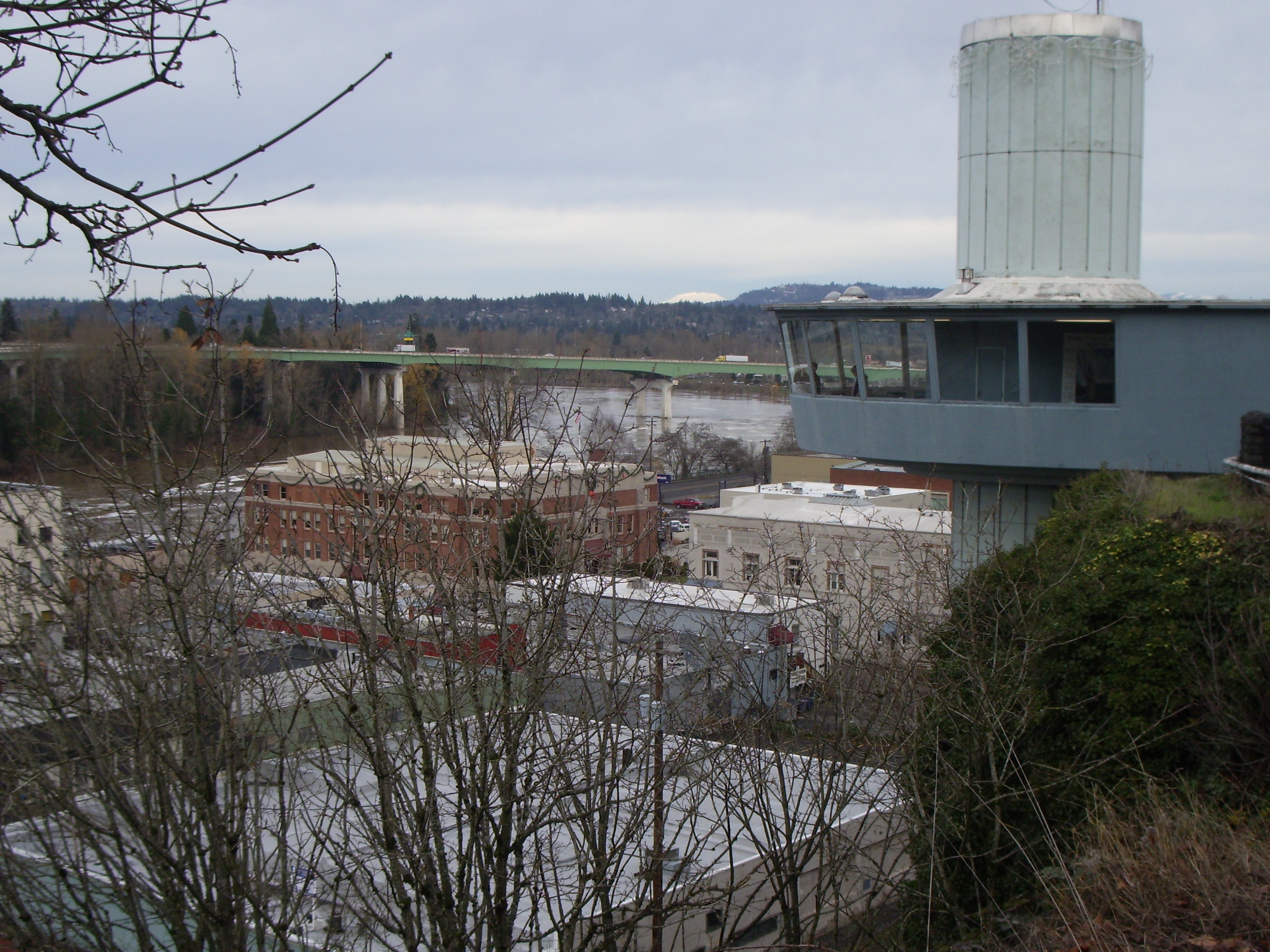
Observation deck view of downtown Oregon City, the Willamette River, West Linn and the Abernethy Bridge

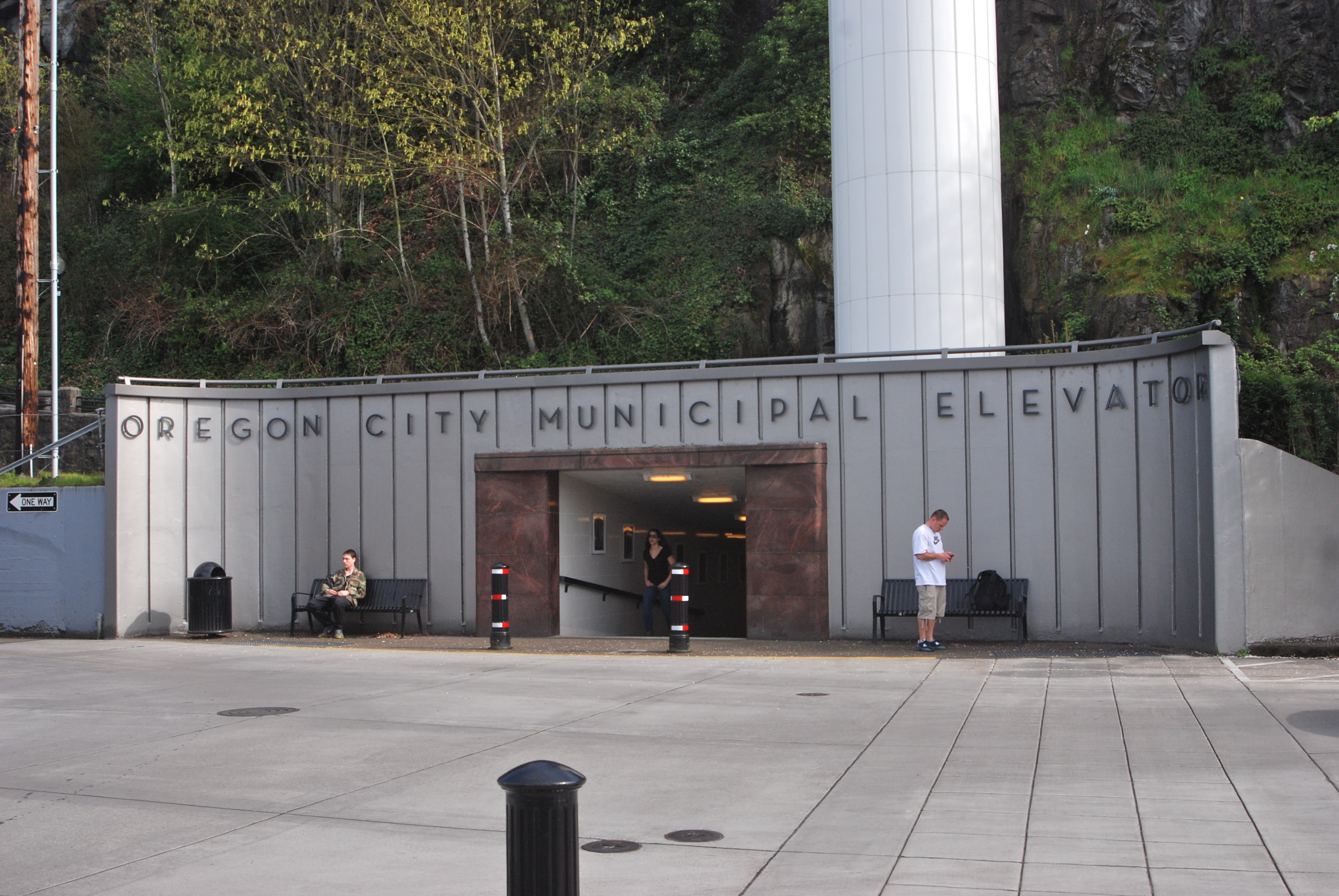
Lower entrance, in Oregon City's historic downtown

After 40 years of service, a replacement was authorized by a $175,000 bond by a special election held May 1952. The specifications called for the design to be "as plain as possible, without ornament". The new elevator, designed by Gordon E. Trapp, engineered by Ervin Aksel Sööt, and manufactured by Otis Elevator, featured push-button operation and automatic doors, and shortened the ride to about 15 seconds. It was dedicated May 5, 1955 and remains in service today. The machine room was upgraded with a digital controller in 2004.

The elevator essentially serves as 7th Street, as both entrances (top and bottom) are on 7th Street, a major thoroughfare on both ends. It's also known as Elevator Street, the only vertical street in North America. The lower entrance is at the intersection of 7th Street (Oregon Route 43) and Railroad Avenue; a short pedestrian tunnel runs under the Union Pacific Railroad tracks, and into the elevator itself. The upper entrance is accessed from High Street, a short distance from the intersection with 7th Street and Singer Hill Road (a road which descends the side of the cliff, connecting 7th Street on the top with 10th Street on the bottom). The upper level includes an observation deck, from which one can see Willamette Falls, the Oregon City Bridge, and the Abernethy Bridge.

The elevator formerly had an operator, but due to the COVID-19 pandemic the elevator has since become self-service. It is open 7 AM to 7 PM, Monday and Tuesday; 7 AM to 9:30 PM, Wednesday through Saturday; and 10 AM to 7 PM on Sundays. There is no charge to use the elevator. It was carrying an average of 500 people per day as of 1989, and by 2008 this had grown to nearly 800. Ridership is as high as 1,300 people per day during the city's summer tourist season.

The "Illuminate Oregon City" project turned the elevator into a massive video screen, showcasing video and images from area sites. The video mapping program was slated to run until 2015.

== See also ==
- National Register of Historic Places listings in Clackamas County, Oregon
