= Oregon City Bridge =

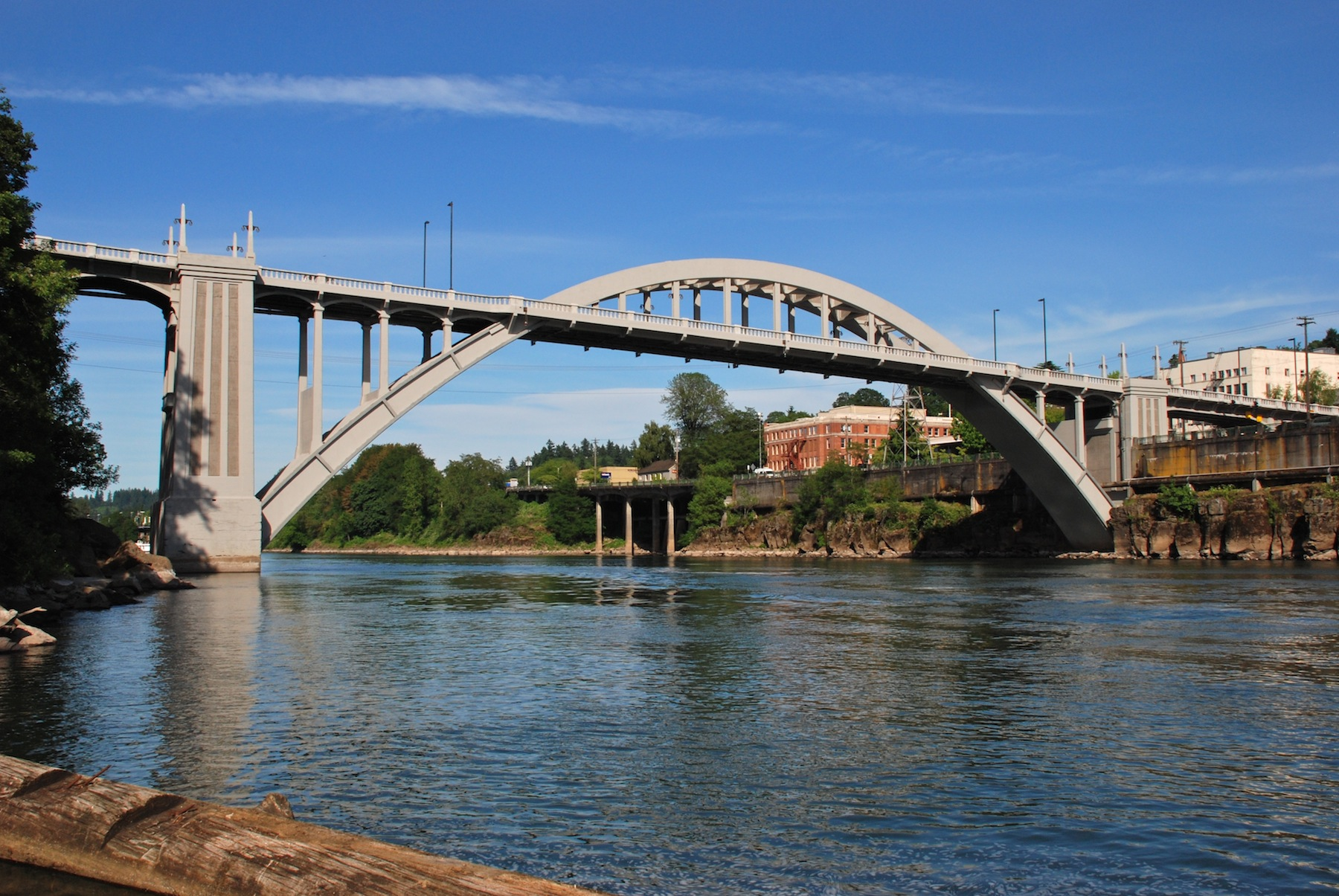
- Coordinates: 45°21′33″N 122°36′35″W
- Carries: OR 43
- Crosses: Willamette River
- Locale: Oregon City to West Linn, Oregon, United States
- Maintained by: Oregon DOT

Characteristics
- Design: through arch of hollow box girder construction
- Total length: 745 ft (227 m)
- Longest span: 360 ft (110 m)

History
- Opened: December 28, 1922
- Willamette River Bridge (No. 357)
- U.S. National Register of Historic Places
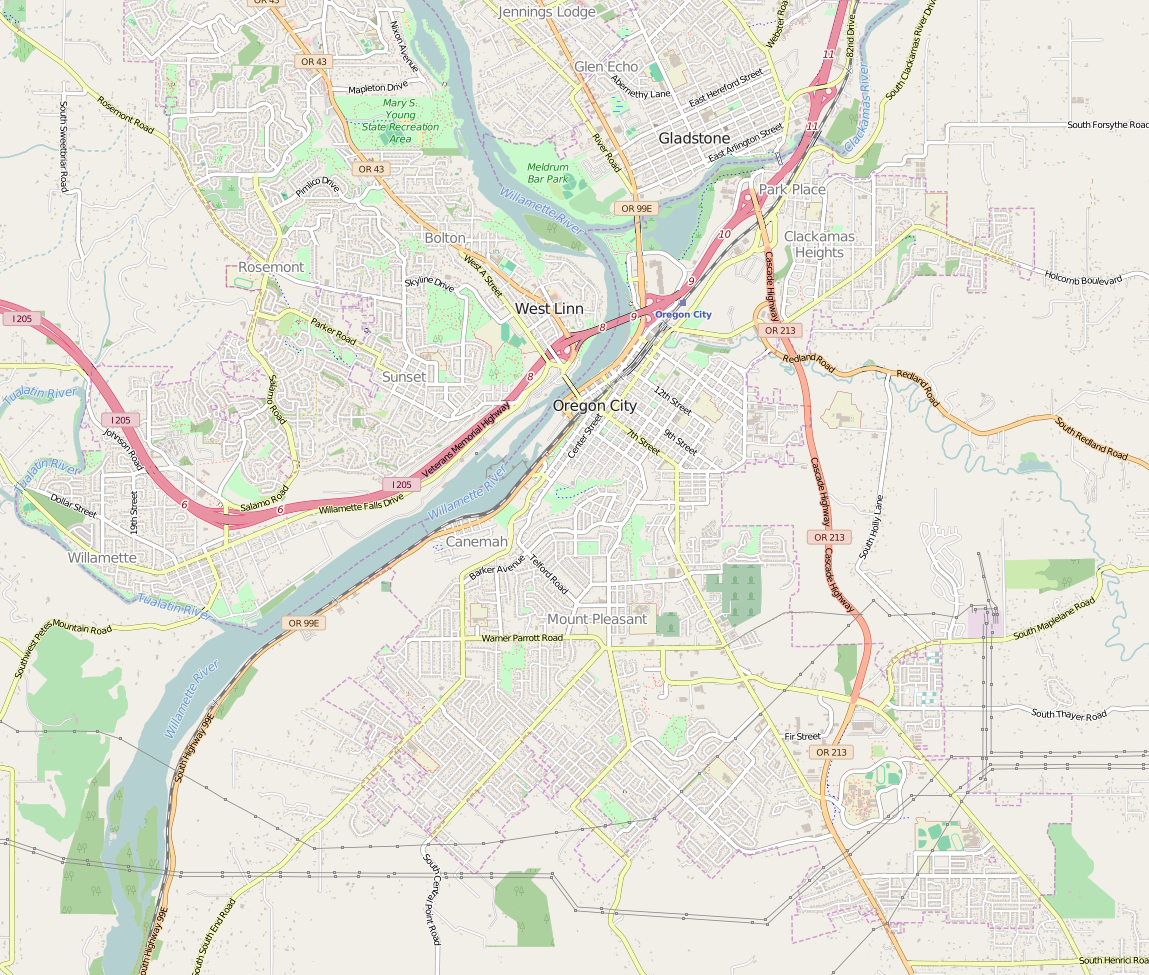
- Location within Oregon City OR Location within Oregon Location within the United States
- Location: Oregon City, Oregon; Willamette River at river mile 26.0
- Built: 1922
- Architect: Conde B. McCullough
- NRHP reference No.: 05000639
- Added to NRHP: July 1, 2005

Location
- Interactive map of Oregon City Bridge

The Oregon City Bridge, also known as the Arch Bridge, is a steel through arch bridge spanning the Willamette River between Oregon City and West Linn, Oregon, United States. Completed in 1922, it is listed on the National Register of Historic Places. It was built and is owned by the Oregon Department of Transportation (ODOT) as part of Oregon Route 43 and is the third-southernmost Willamette bridge in the Portland metropolitan area, after the Boone Bridge in Wilsonville and the Oregon 219 bridge near Newberg.

The bridge is 745 ft (227 m) in length and 28 ft (8½ m) wide with a 360 ft (110 m) long main span that provides 49 ft (15 m) of vertical clearance at low river levels. The narrow width causes problems for large vehicles that cross it, often requiring traffic going in the other direction to stop. TriMet buses ceased using the bridge in 2009.

This bridge is the only Oregon bridge to be encased in gunite, which protects it from corrosive sulfur dioxide emissions from paper mills south of the bridge. The concrete look was favored by bridge designer Conde McCullough, designer of 500 Oregon bridges. His signature detailing is evident in the obelisk pylons with sconced light fixtures, ornate railings, and Art Deco piers.

The Oregon City Bridge is just downstream from the 40 ft (12 m) tall Willamette Falls and the Willamette Falls Locks, the oldest navigational locks in the United States. Downstream from this bridge is the George Abernethy Bridge, which carries Interstate 205.

== History ==
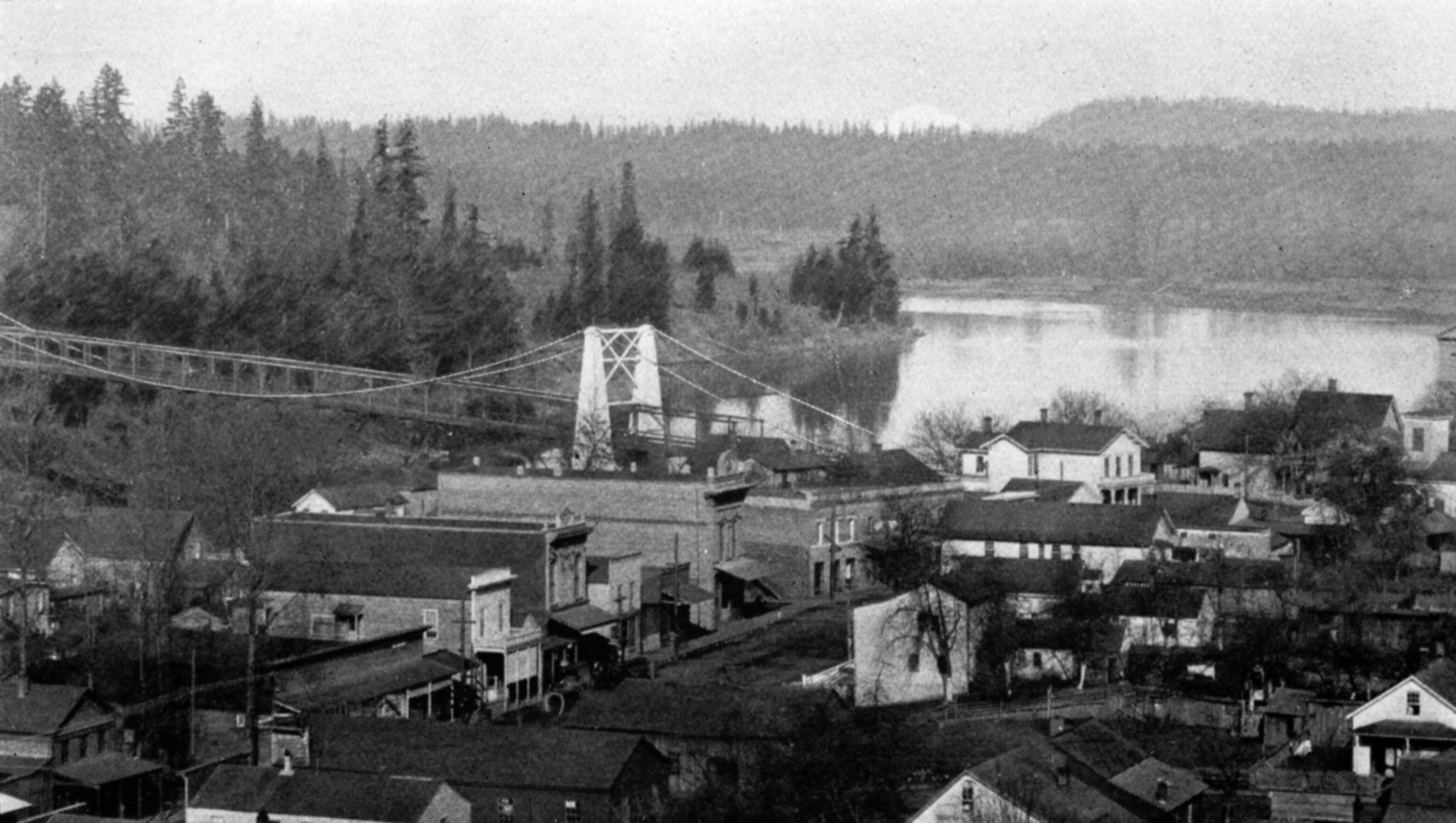
Original bridge as depicted in Frances Fuller Victor's Atlantis Arisen (1891).

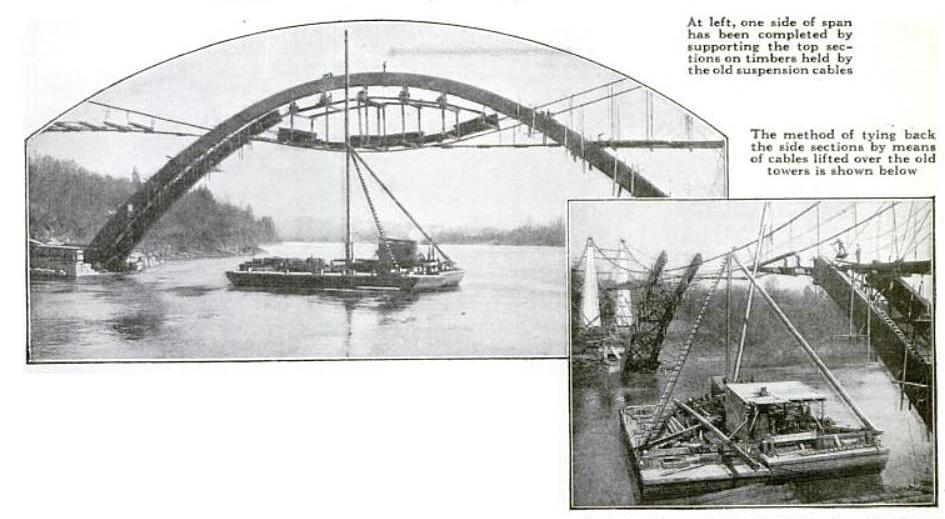
Construction workers using the old suspension bridge to support the arch of the new bridge while under construction. Credit:Popular Science, November 1922

The bridge was built to replace a pedestrian cable-suspension bridge completed in 1888. This existing bridge was utilized continuously during the construction process of the replacement, not only as access to the site for men and materials – assembling the box steel frames and pouring the reinforced concrete from its walkway – but also as the main support system during the completion of the arch itself. Construction was made difficult by the engineering challenges posed by the great depth of the river at the site and worse from the need to manage and accommodate the frequent and ever increasing water traffic on its surface. The completed bridge was opened to the public on December 28, 1922, with the cost of construction reported as $300,000.

The piers were designed to accommodate public restrooms. The deck widens at the piers to provide room for the stairways – one on each side of the deck – that once descended to the restrooms. Repeated vandalism led to the closure of the restrooms in 1937, and the stairway entrances were covered over with concrete. Windows for "observation balconies" that were originally included in the piers, at the tops on both sides, were also sealed in concrete after closure. The bridge was added to the National Register of Historic Places (as the Willamette River (Oregon City) Bridge (No. 357)) on July 1, 2005.

In March 2009, ODOT imposed new weight limits for vehicles crossing the bridge, after inspections revealed damage to some of the structure's floor beams. Large commercial vehicles, or any vehicle weighing more than 14 tons, were banned from using the bridge. Among other impacts, the restriction meant the rerouting of all TriMet buses. The two routes using the bridge at that time, 35-Macadam and 154-Willamette, were rerouted across the Abernethy Bridge (I-205 bridge).

In 2010–2012, the Oregon City Bridge was given an extensive rehabilitation, overseen by ODOT. Work began in July 2010, and the bridge was temporarily closed to all traffic starting in January 2011. The bridge reopened on October 15, 2012, with the $15 million restoration project nearly completed. The final items of work were completed in early 2013. According to ODOT, one of the "intentions" of the project was to "restore [the bridge's] original load-carrying capacity", which would permit TriMet buses to resume using the bridge. However, as of September 2013 TriMet service had not returned to the bridge, and it is unknown whether the transit agency is planning to restore the former routings, or whether ODOT actually has restored the old (higher) load limits.

== Current use ==
As of 2000, the bridge carried 12,800 vehicles per day, which represents only a 40% growth in traffic since 1953, when a public debate was held about building a parallel bridge next to the existing bridge. While the Oregon City Bridge did not get twinned, the George Abernethy Bridge (I-205 Bridge) opened in 1970 and has since become the major route through the area. TriMet buses crossed the bridge until March 2009, when a new weight limit temporarily banned buses and heavy commercial vehicles from using the bridge.

== Gallery ==
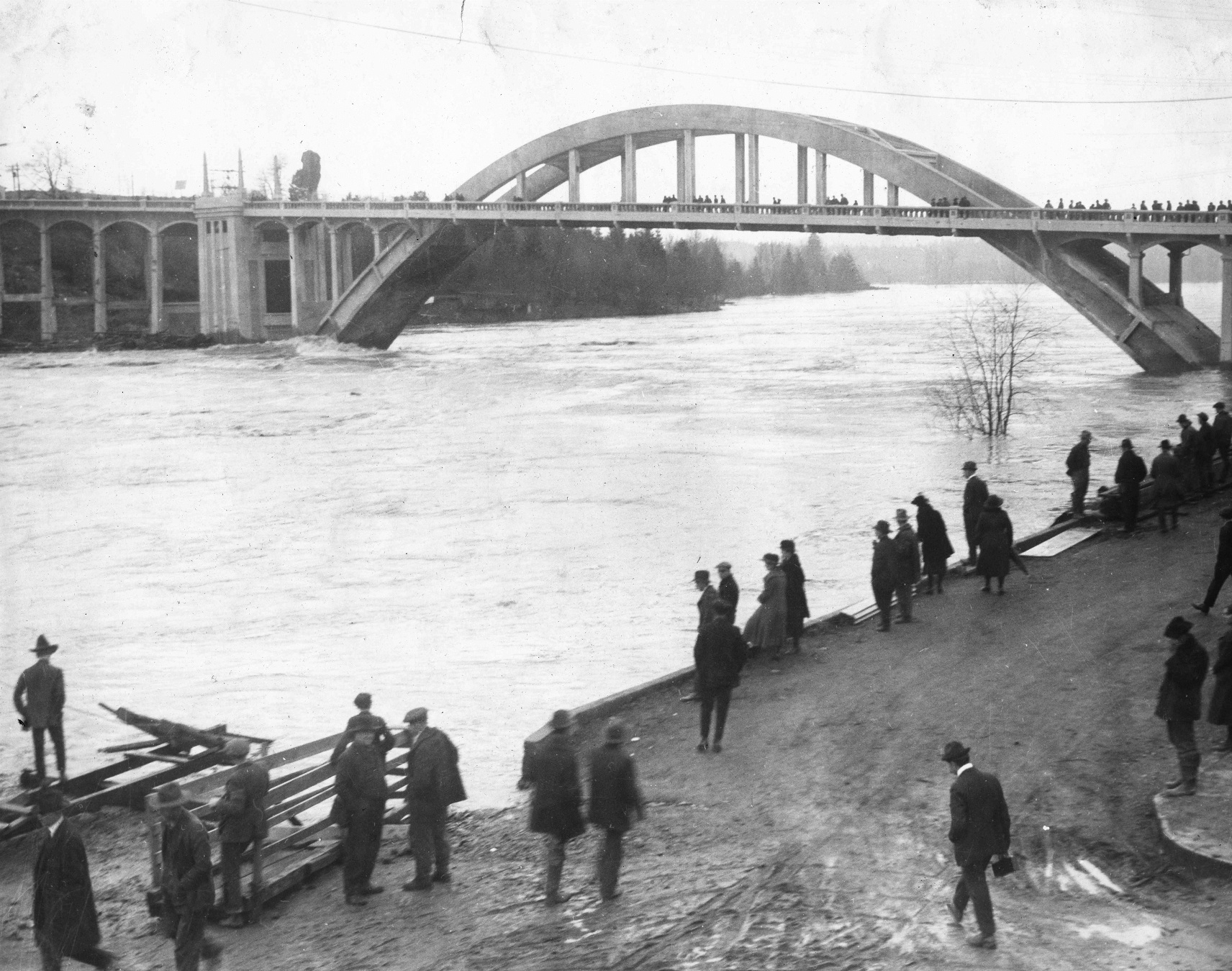
The bridge in 1922

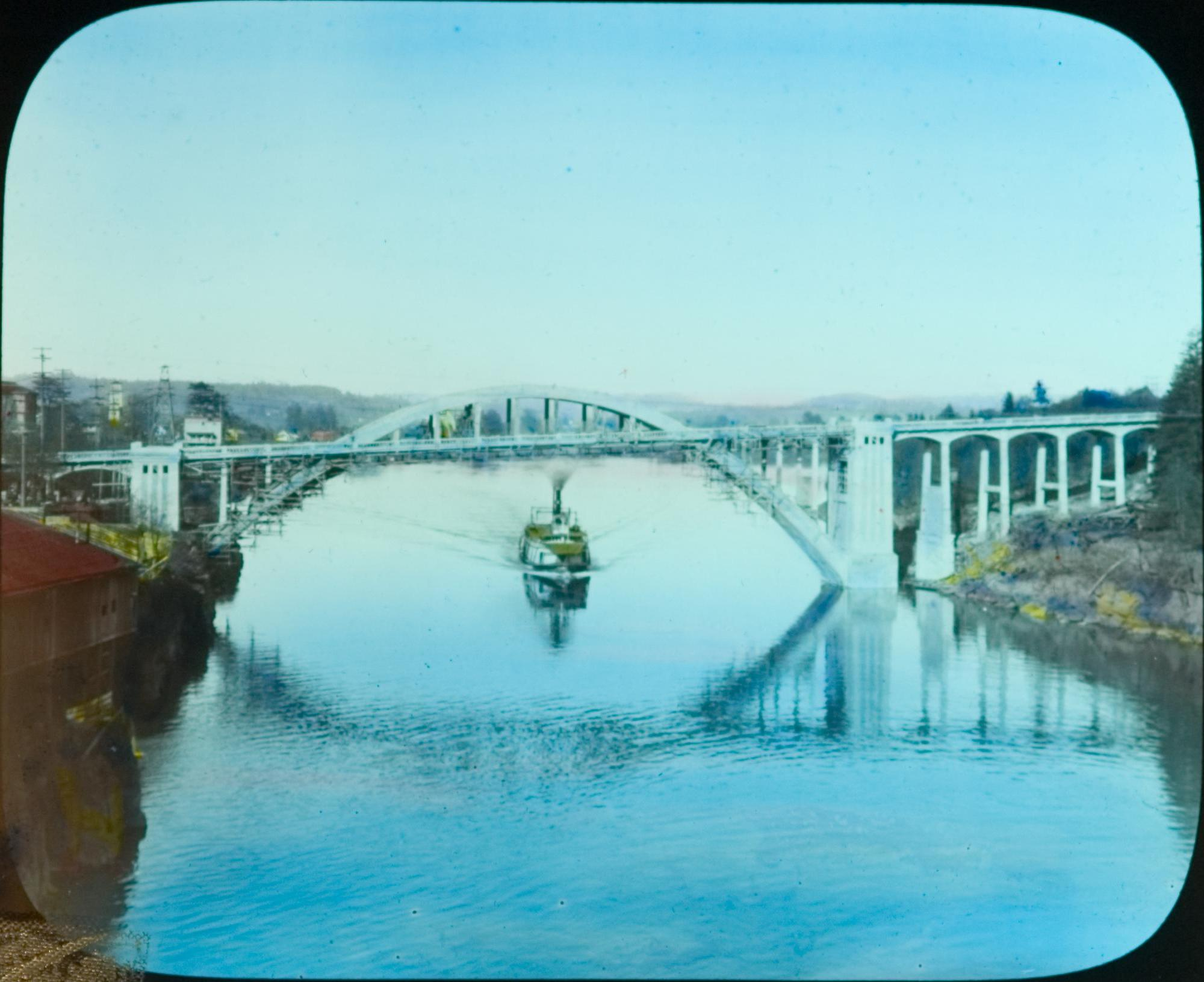
Colorized slide, 1920s

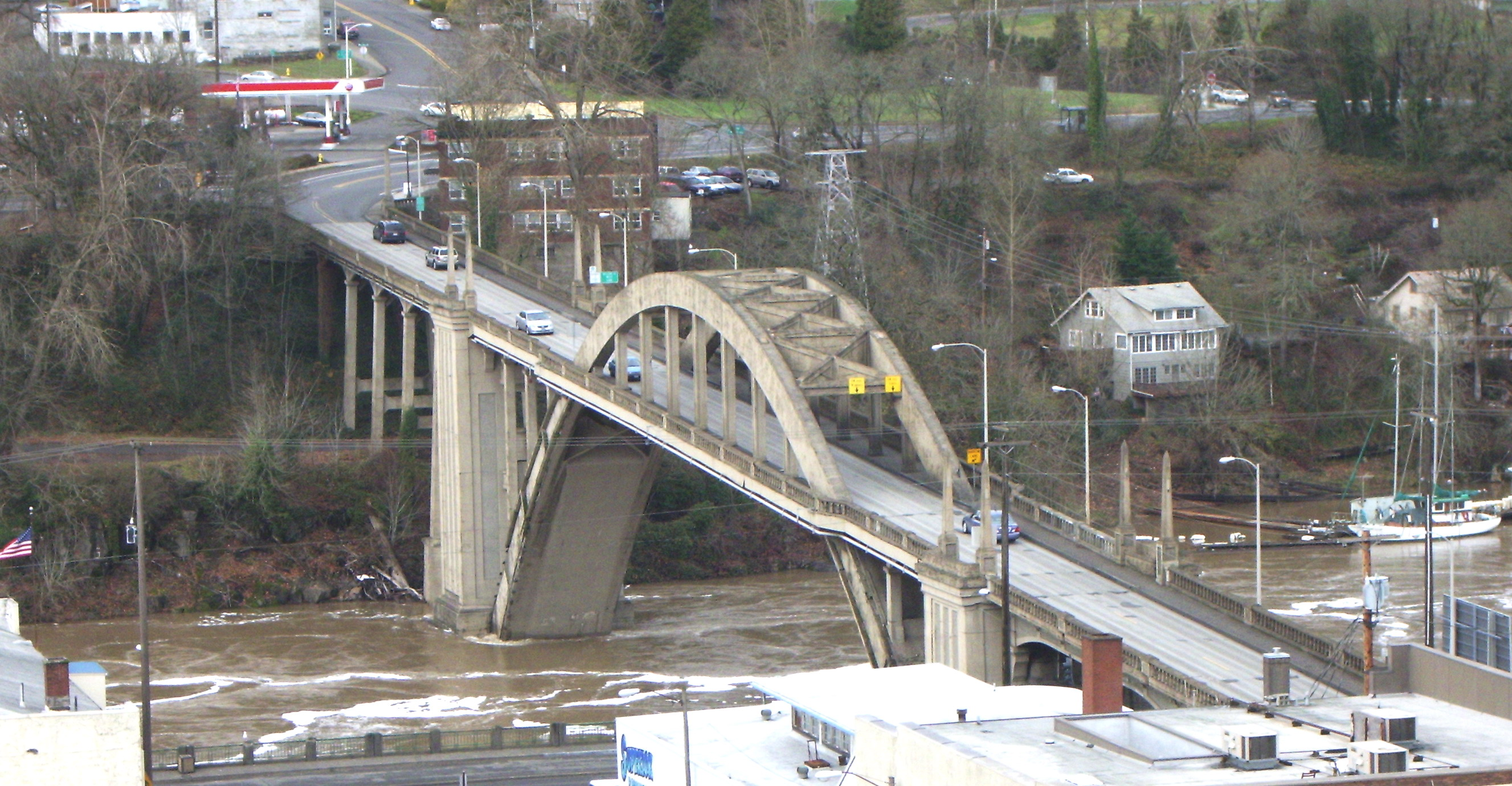
Oregon City bridge as seen from McLoughlin Promenade

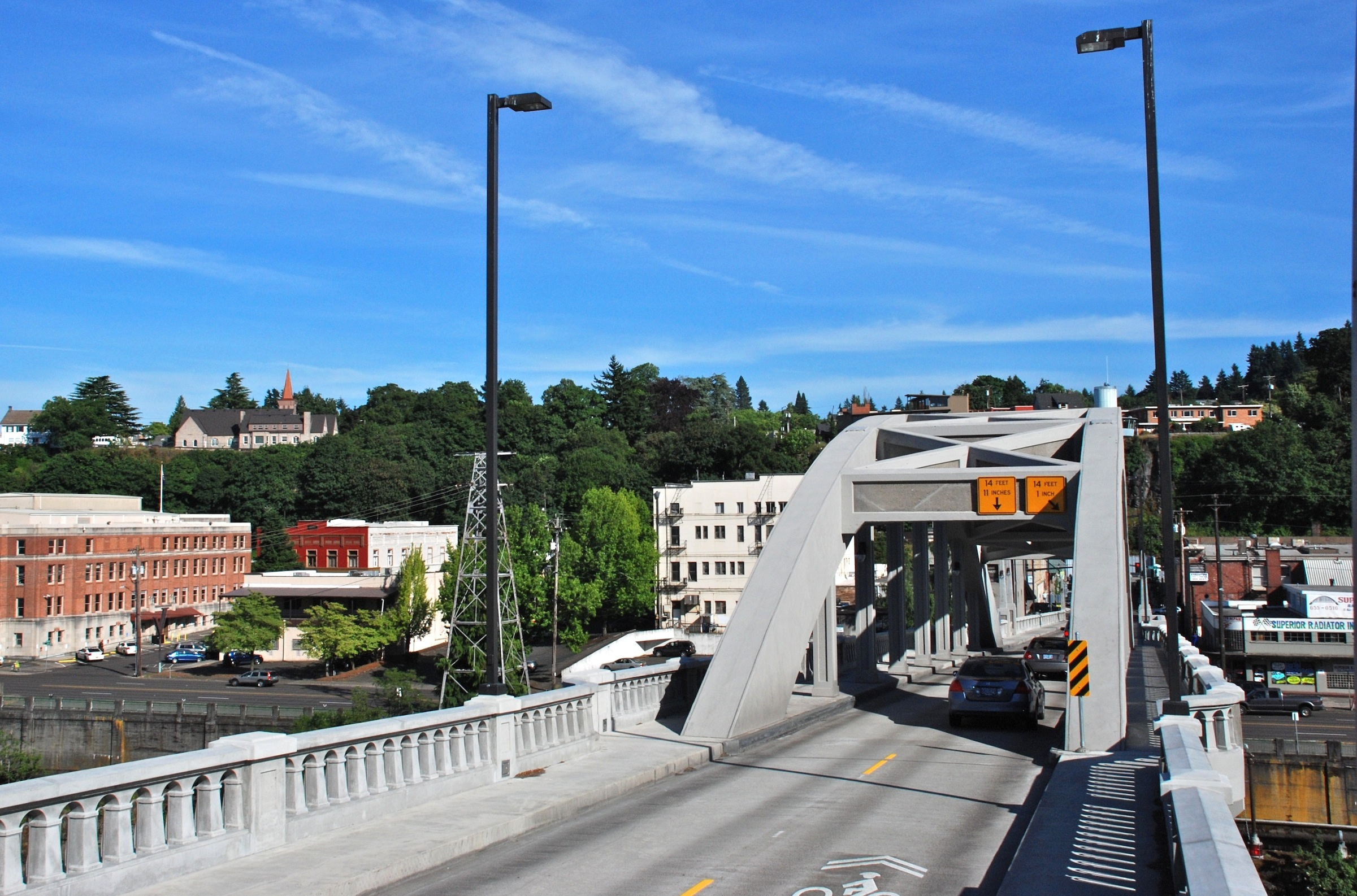
Surface view looking toward Oregon City

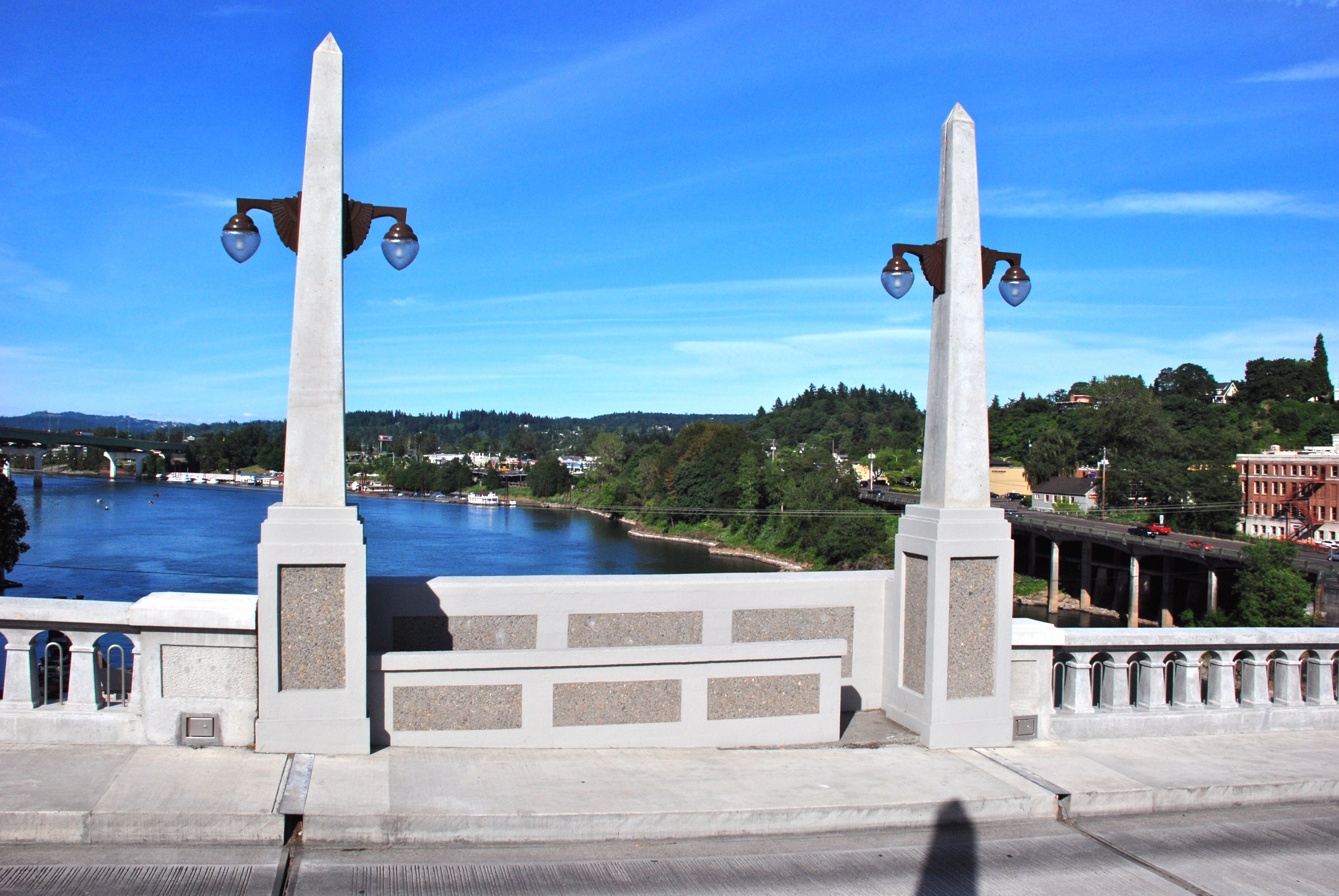
Former restroom stairway entrance, flanked by art-deco lighting fixtures

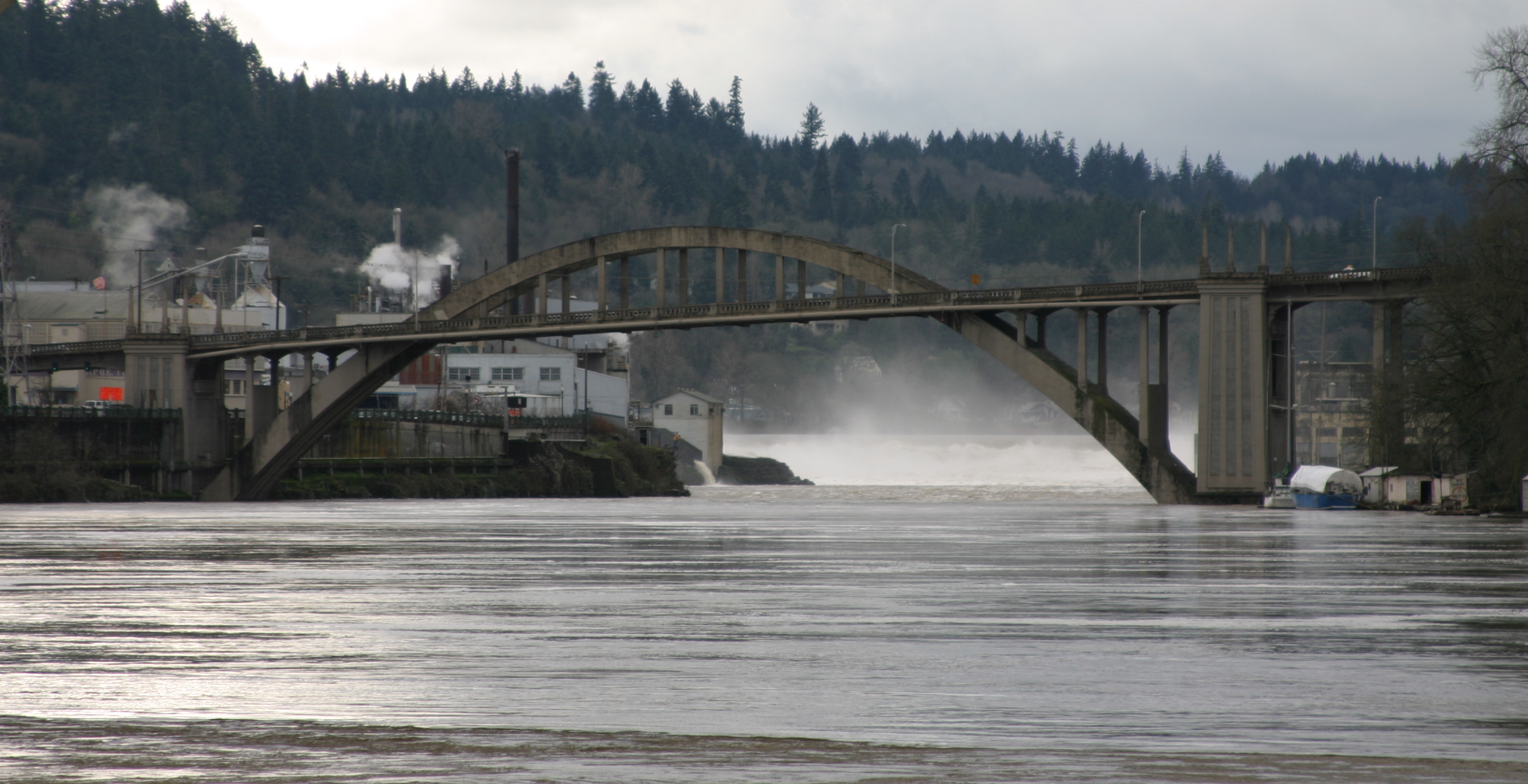
View from northeast, with Willamette Falls in background

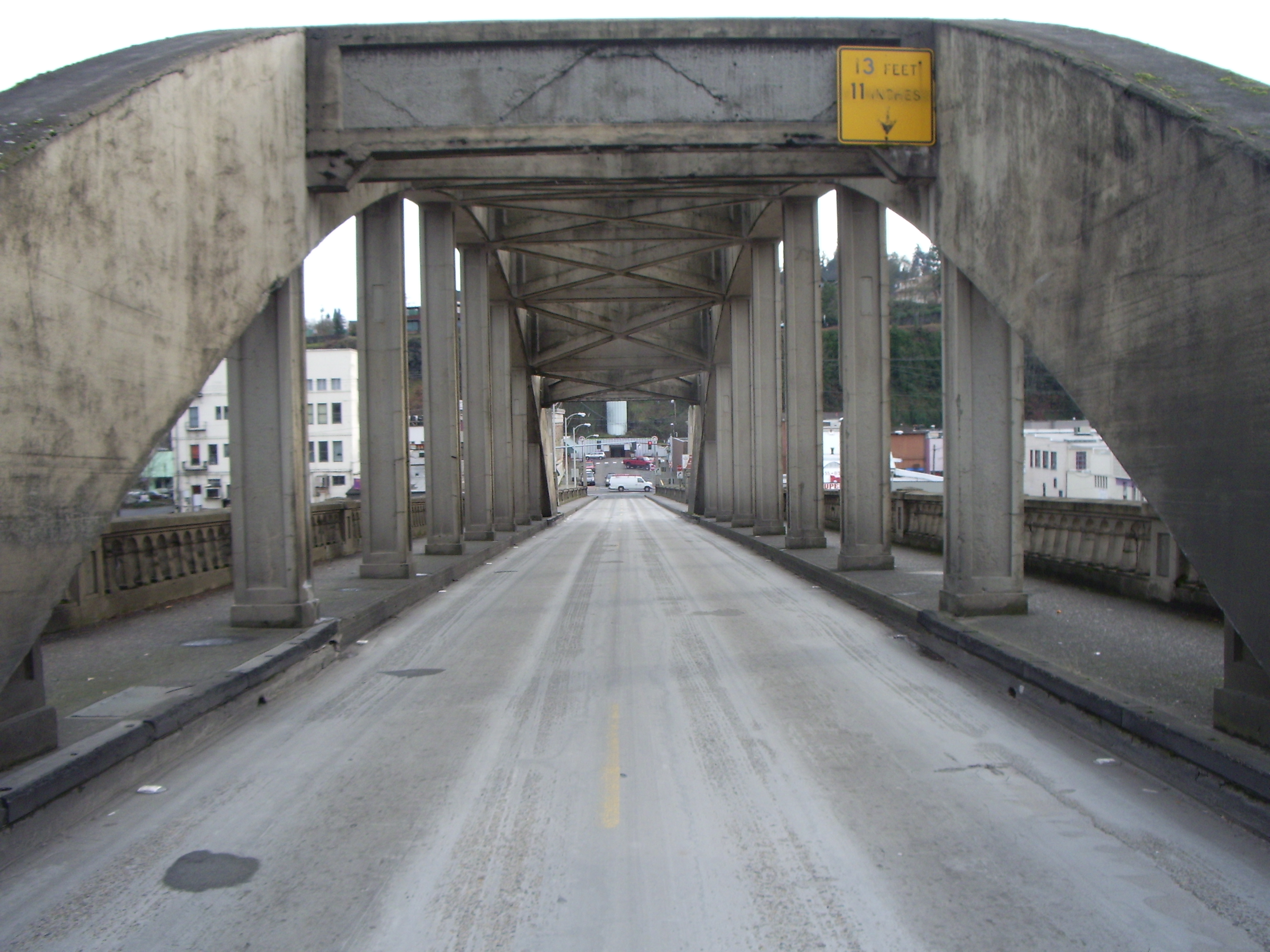
Interior of bridge with bottom of Oregon City Municipal Elevator visible

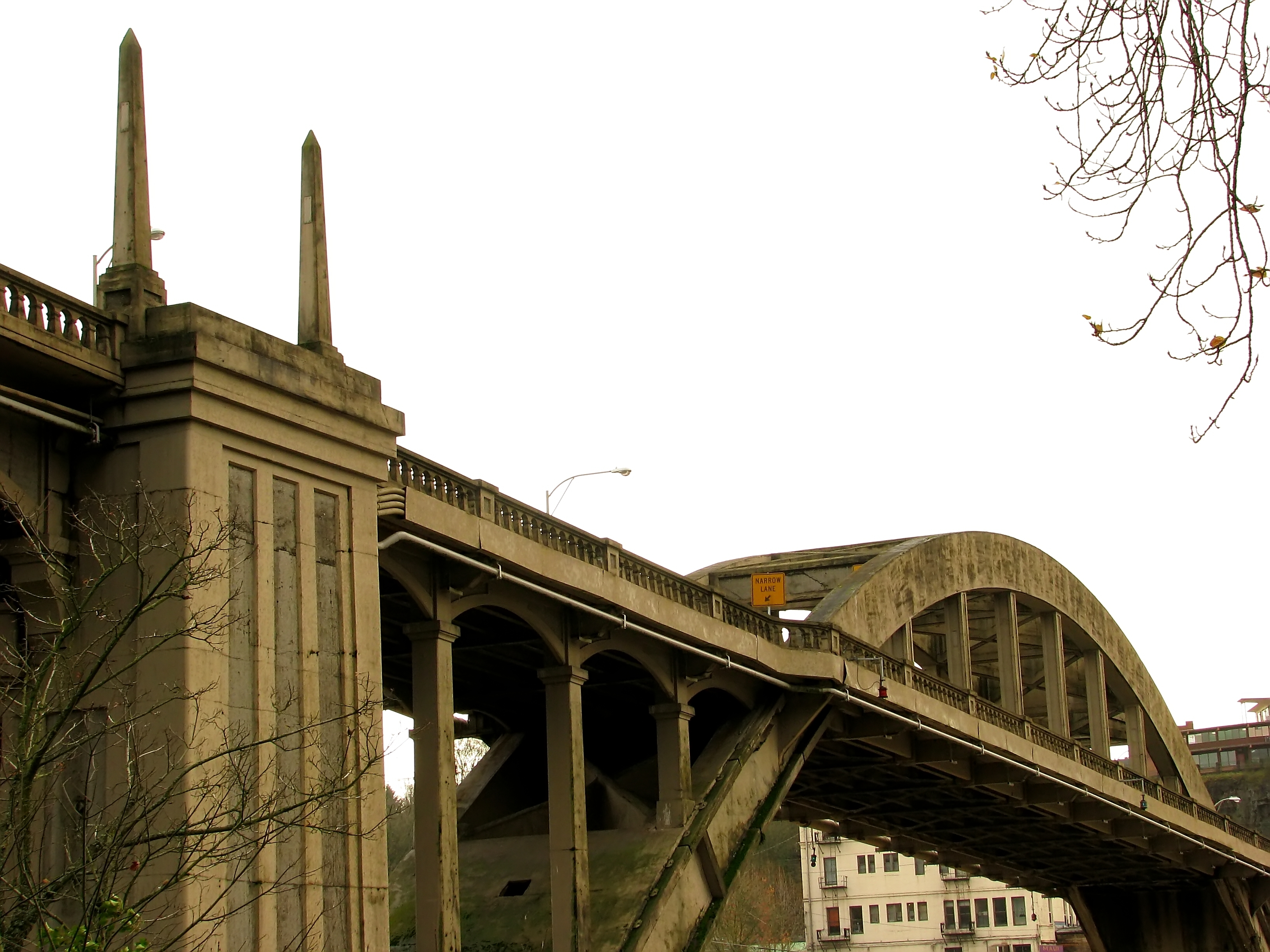
Looking up at Oregon City Bridge from Frontier Street in West Linn, in 2007, before lights were reinstalled on the obelisks

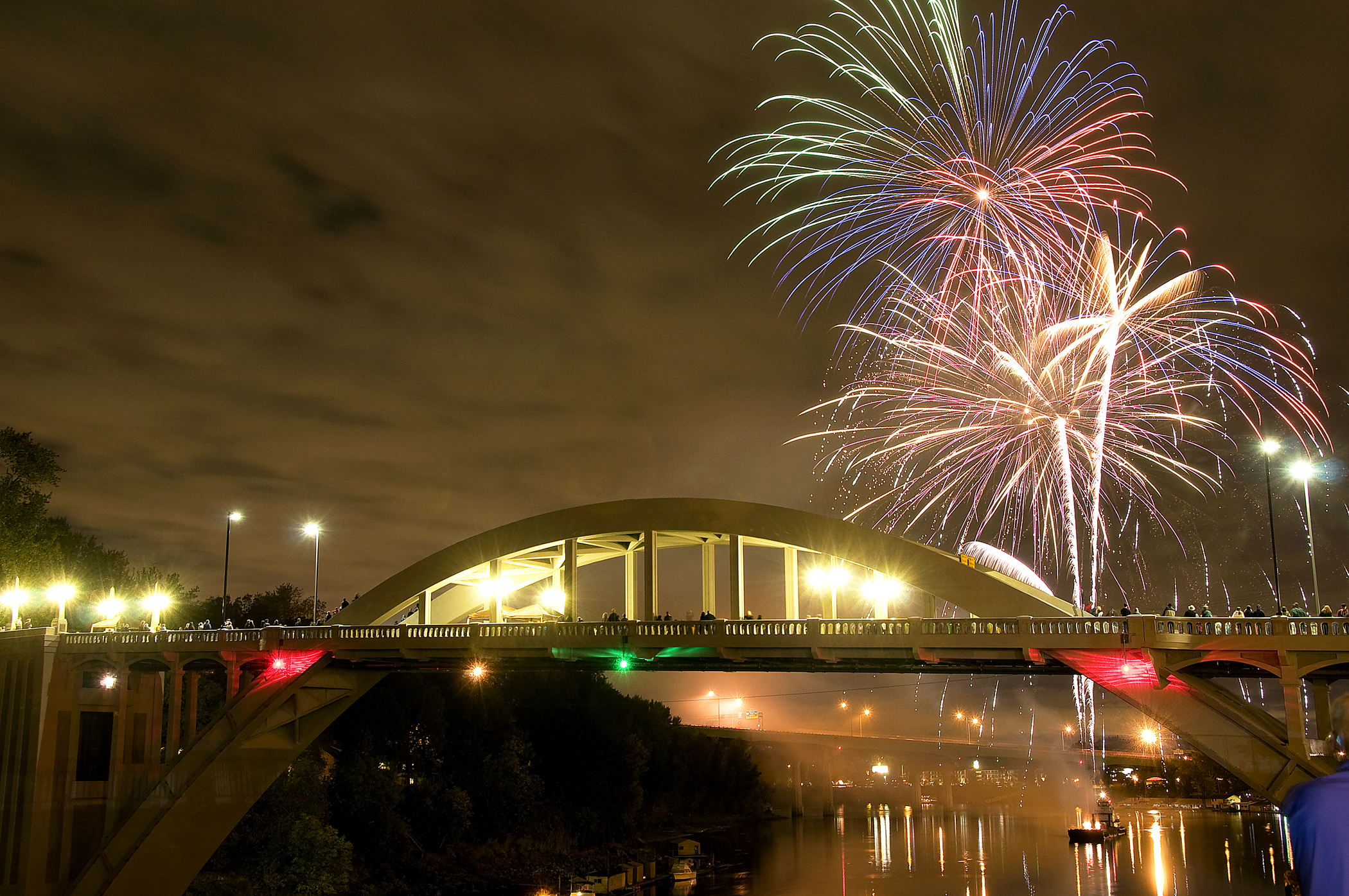
Fireworks in celebration of the bridge's reopening in 2012 after a two-year rehabilitation

== See also ==
- List of bridges documented by the Historic American Engineering Record in Oregon
- List of bridges on the National Register of Historic Places in Oregon
- List of crossings of the Willamette River
