= Jon Storm Park =

Public park in Oregon City, Oregon, U.S.

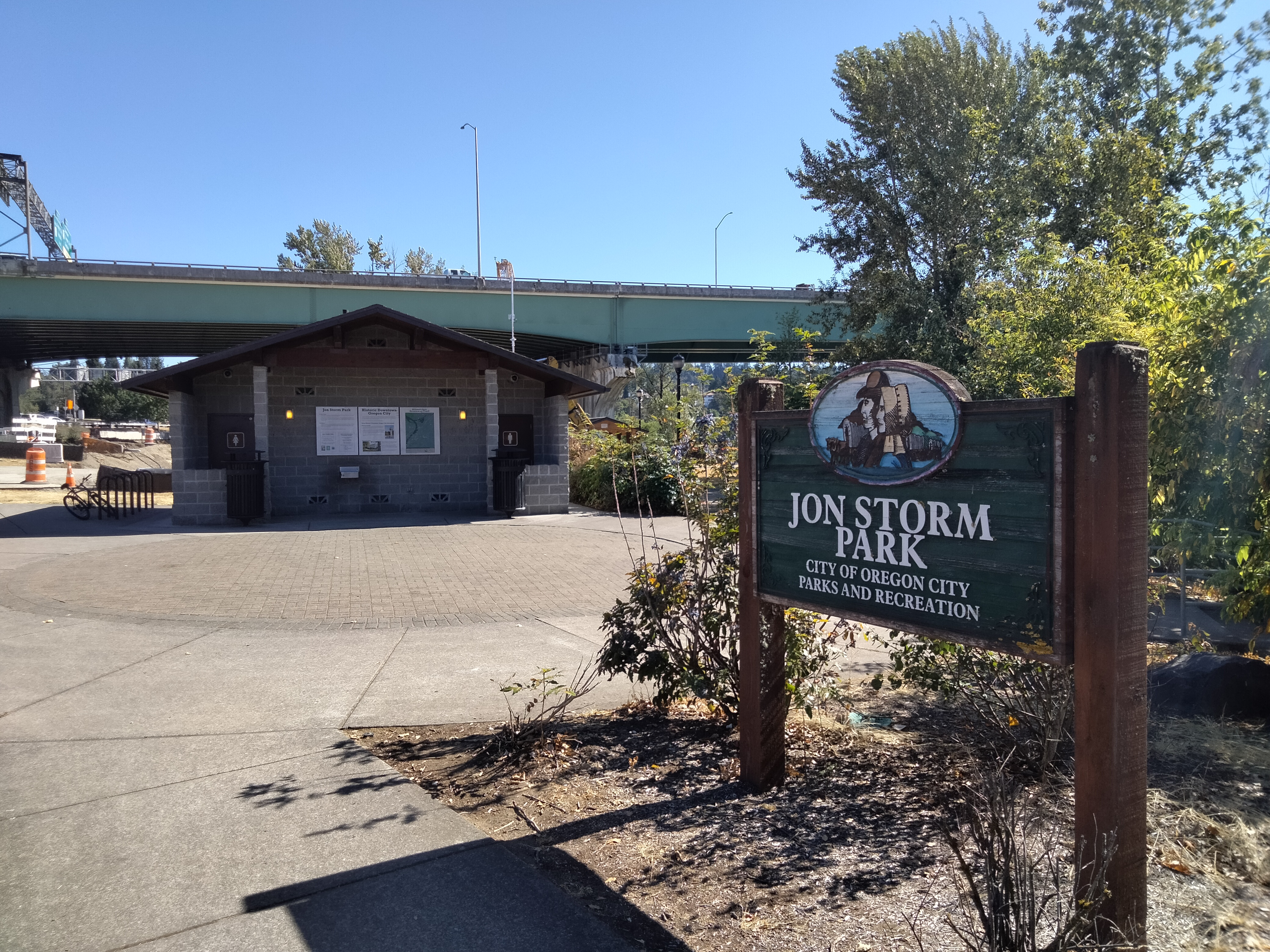
- Entrance

- Location within Oregon
- Location: Oregon City, Oregon, U.S.
- Coordinates: 45°21′56″N 122°36′7″W

Jon Storm Park is a public park in Oregon City, in the U.S. state of Oregon. Named after a community volunteer who died in 1994, the park opened in 2008 and has a picnic shelter and plaza.
