= Abernethy Bridge =

George Abernethy Bridge
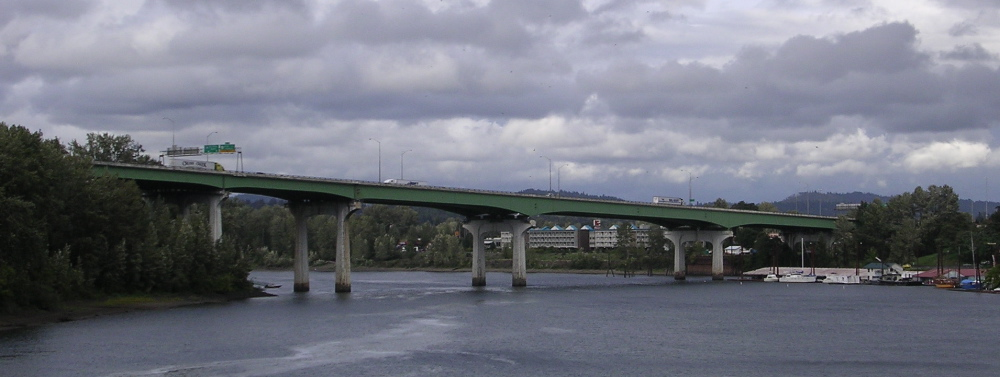
- Coordinates: 45.3645°N 122.6039°W
- Carries: I-205 (6 lanes)
- Crosses: Willamette River
- Locale: Oregon City, Oregon
- Owner: Oregon Department of Transportation

Characteristics
- Design: Box Girder
- Material: Steel
- Total length: 2,727 feet (831 m)
- Longest span: 430 feet (130 m)
- No. of spans: 15
- Clearance below: 85 feet (26 m)

History
- Architect: Moffatt, Nichols & Bonney
- Construction cost: $17.1 million
- Opened: May 28, 1970

Statistics
- Daily traffic: 102,400 (2004); 95,500 (2008)

Location
- Interactive map of George Abernethy Bridge

The George Abernethy Bridge, or simply Abernethy Bridge, is a steel plate and box girder bridge that spans the Willamette River between Oregon City and West Linn, Oregon, United States, and which carries Interstate 205. It is also known as the Oregon City Freeway Bridge and the I-205 Bridge.

The bridge was dedicated and opened on May 28, 1970, and cost $17.1 million to construct. It is named for George Abernethy, who was the governor of the Provisional Government of the Oregon Country from 1845 to 1849 and later an Oregon City businessman. An approximately $7 million seismic retrofit began in 2000 and was completed in 2002. In 2008, the average traffic was 95,500 vehicles per day.

== Description ==
The bridge structure contains 15 spans and 60 girders. The total length is 2,727 feet (831 metres), and the vertical clearance at low river levels is 85 ft (26 m). The longest span is 430 feet (130 m) and is sandwiched by two 300-foot (91 m) spans. The bridge carries six lanes of traffic (three in each direction—two through lanes, and one merging lane). Interchanges are located at each end of the bridge: On the western end (in West Linn) is an interchange with Oregon Route 43; on the eastern end (in Oregon City) is an interchange with OR 99E. The bridge is somewhat unusual in that its western approach is located on a bluff overlooking the river, whereas the eastern end is located in a lowland just south of the confluence of the Willamette and Clackamas rivers; as a result, westbound traffic on I-205 travels uphill the entire length of the bridge, and continues uphill for another half-mile before the freeway summits and heads back downhill, into the lower Tualatin River basin.

== History ==
Construction of a new east–west bridge between West Linn and Oregon City was approved by the Oregon State Highway Commission in January 1964. The proposed bridge was later incorporated into the plans for I-205 in 1965 after it was relocated away from a routing through Lake Oswego. Construction began in early 1968 and was completed on May 28, 1970, at a cost of $17.1 million; it was originally scheduled to open in December 1969. Several West Linn citizens staged an unofficial "opening" on April 1 to jokingly dedicate the bridge as the "West Linn Bridge". The city later changed its seal to include a depiction of the bridge.

In 2009, the Oregon Department of Transportation spent $7 million to repave the roadway and replace the expansion joints on the bridge.

In 2017, the Oregon Department of Transportation launched a project to widen I-205 to three lanes between the Abernethy Bridge and Stafford Road. Part of the proposed plan includes removing the Highway 43 to I-205 northbound on-ramp and widening the Abernethy Bridge. The cost of the project increased to $600 million in 2024 and required additional funding to cover a $300 million gap created by higher construction costs and the cancellation of tolling on I-205.

== See also ==
- List of crossings of the Willamette River
