= Oregon City Masonic Lodge =

Building in Oregon City, Oregon, U.S.

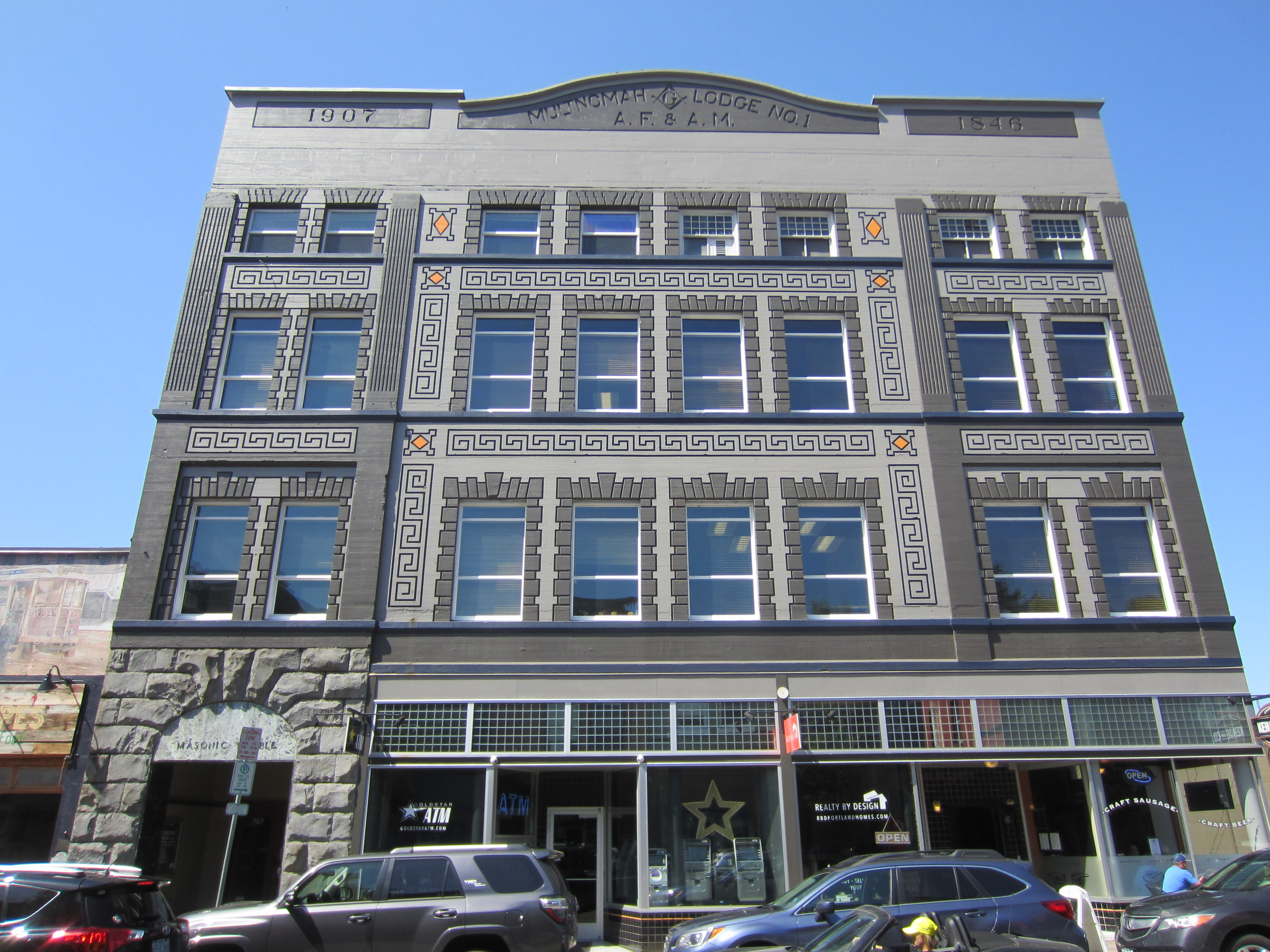
- The building's exterior, 2018
- Interactive map of the Oregon City Masonic Lodge area

General information
- Type: Historic building
- Location: Oregon City, Oregon, United States
- Coordinates: 45.3580567°N 122.6082704°W

The Oregon City Masonic Lodge, also known as Masonic Temple Multnomah No. 1, is an historic building in Oregon City, Oregon, United States. The Masonic building went on the market in 2012.

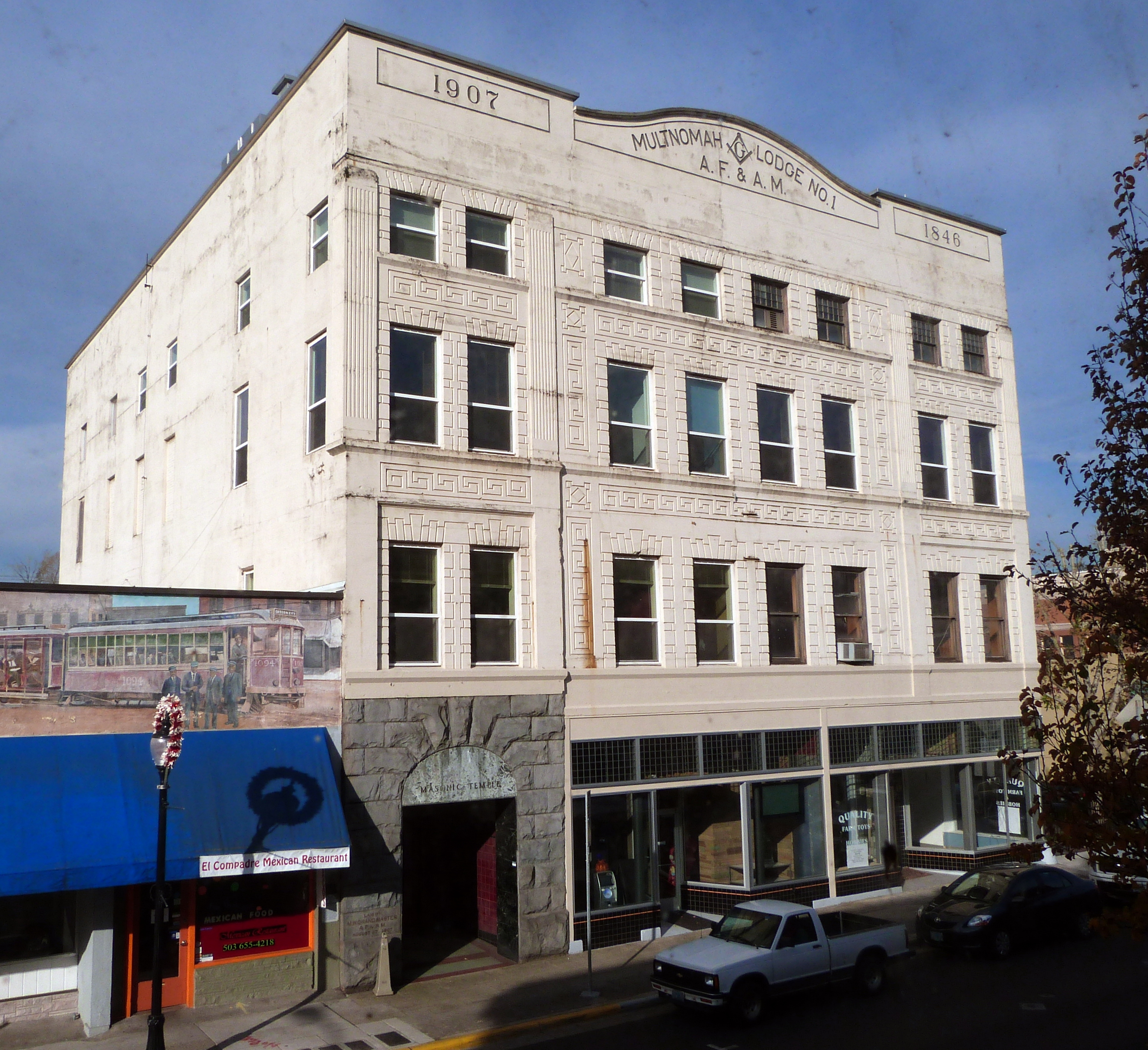
The building's front exterior in 2013
