= Oregon City, Oregon =

City in Oregon, United States

Oregon City, Oregon wálamt (Chinook)
- City
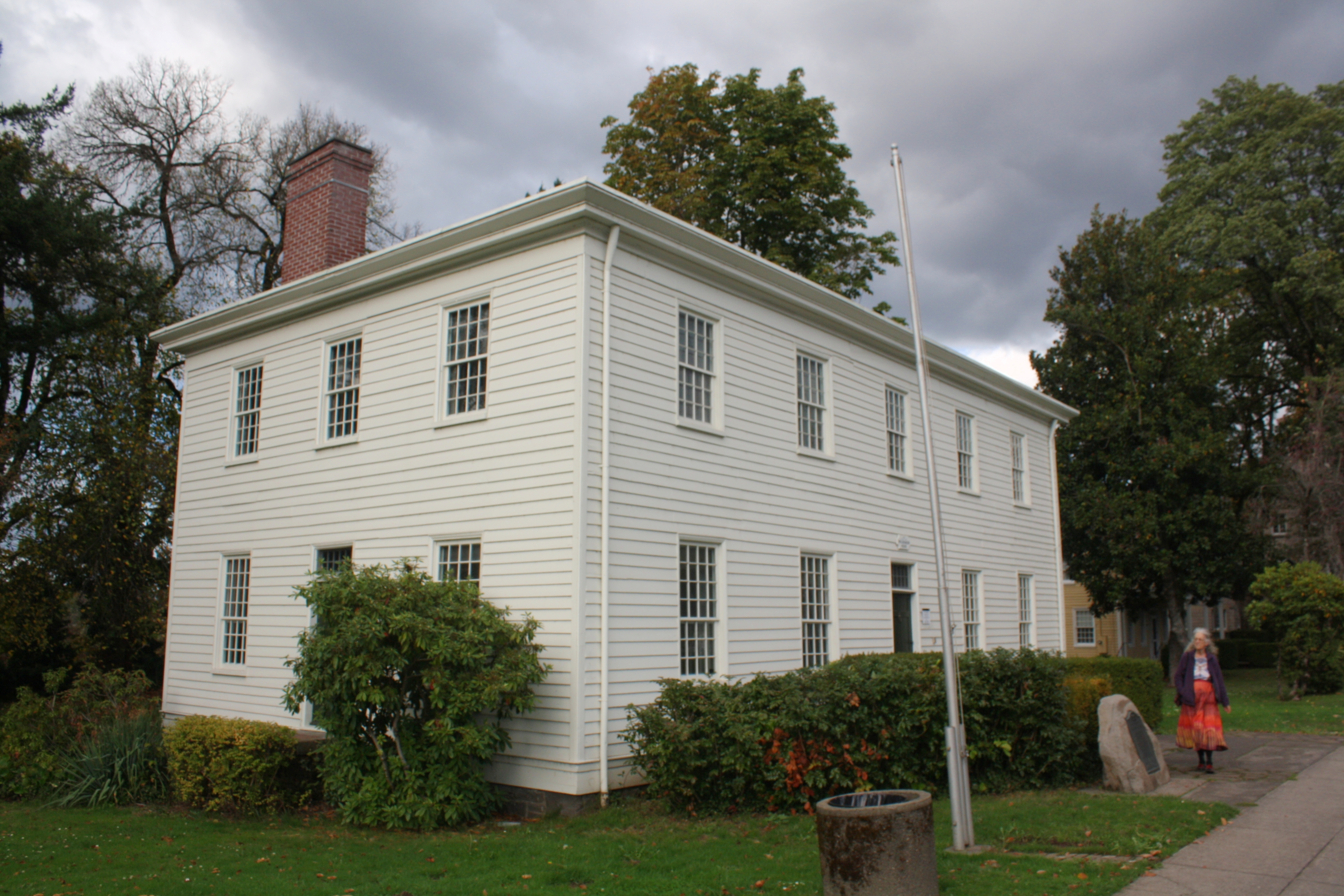
- The McLoughlin House, est. 1845

- Seal
- Nicknames: End of the Oregon Trail, OC
- Motto: Urbs civitatis nostrae prima et mater (English: First and mothertown of our state)
- Location in Oregon

- Location within Oregon Location within the United States
- Coordinates: 45°21′25″N 122°36′24″W
- Country: United States
- State: Oregon
- County: Clackamas
- Founded: 1829
- Incorporated: 1844

Government
  - Mayor: Denyse McGriff

Area
  - Total: 10.29 sq mi (26.64 km^{2})
  - Land: 10.05 sq mi (26.03 km^{2})
  - Water: 0.24 sq mi (0.61 km^{2})
- Elevation: 466 ft (142 m)

Population (2020)
  - Total: 37,572
  - Density: 3,738.8/sq mi (1,443.54/km^{2})
- Time zone: UTC−8 (PST)
  - Summer (DST): UTC−7 (PDT)
- ZIP code: 97045
- Area codes: 503 and 971
- FIPS code: 41-55200
- GNIS feature ID: 2411332
- Website: www.orcity.org

Oregon City is a city in and the county seat of Clackamas County, Oregon, United States, located on the Willamette River near the southern limits of the Portland metropolitan area. As of the 2020 census, the city population was 37,572. Established in 1829 by the Hudson's Bay Company, in 1844, it became the first U.S. city west of the Rocky Mountains to be incorporated.

== History ==
The land was originally home to Clowwewalla, Cashhooks and the Molalla Native Americans.

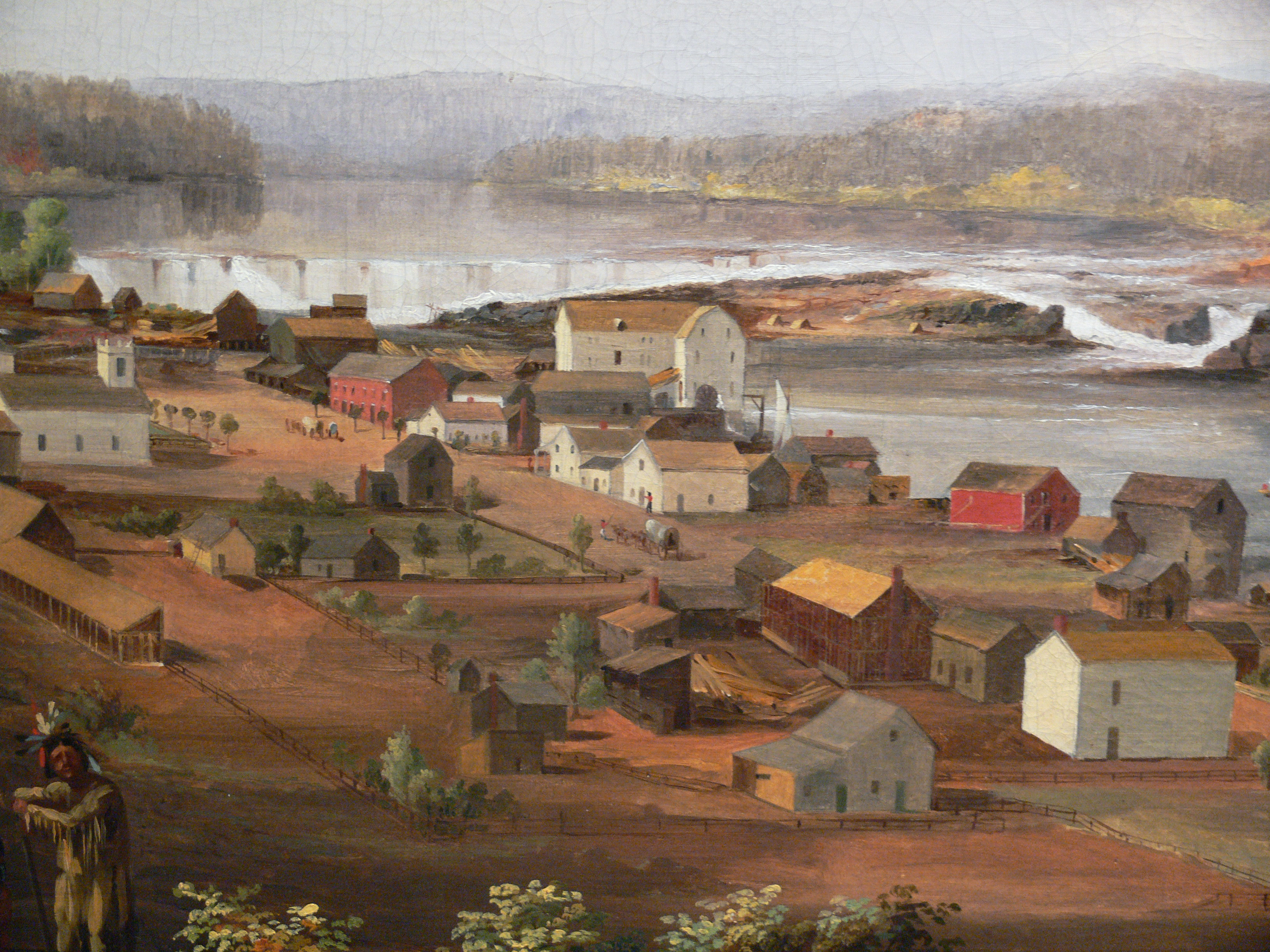
Detail from Oregon City on the Willamette River by John Mix Stanley, c. 1850s (Amon Carter Museum of American Art)

Known in recent decades as the site of several large paper mills on the Willamette River, the city played a significant role in the early history of the Oregon Country. It was established by Hudson's Bay Company's Dr. John McLoughlin in 1829 near the confluence of the Clackamas River with the Willamette to take advantage of the power of Willamette Falls to run a lumber mill. During the 1840s and 1850s it was the destination for those wanting to file land claims after traveling the Oregon Trail as the last stop on the trail.

It was the capital of the Oregon Territory from its establishment in 1848 until 1851, and rivaled Portland for early supremacy in the area. In 1846, the city's newspaper, the Oregon Spectator, was the first American newspaper to be published west of the Rocky Mountains. Oregon City College was established in 1849 as a Baptist school, but was defunct by the 1870s. Oregon City was the site of the Beaver Coins Mint, producing the short-lived independent Oregon Territory currency in 1849.

The center of the city retains part of its historic character through the preservation of houses and other buildings from the era of the city's founding.

The town became the see city of the first Roman Catholic archdiocese in the western United States, when the diocese of Oregon City, established in 1846, was raised to metropolitan rank, with Archbishop François Norbert Blanchet as its ordinary. Its territory included all of the western United States. The population in the area of Oregon City declined due to the California Gold Rush. The population of nearby Portland grew, and the headquarters of the archdiocese was moved there in 1926. In 1928 the name Archdiocese of Portland in Oregon replaced the former name. No longer a residential bishopric, Oregon City is now a titular see.

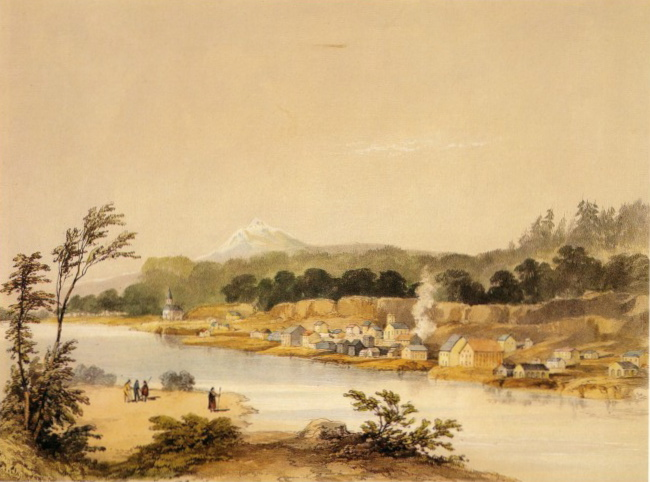
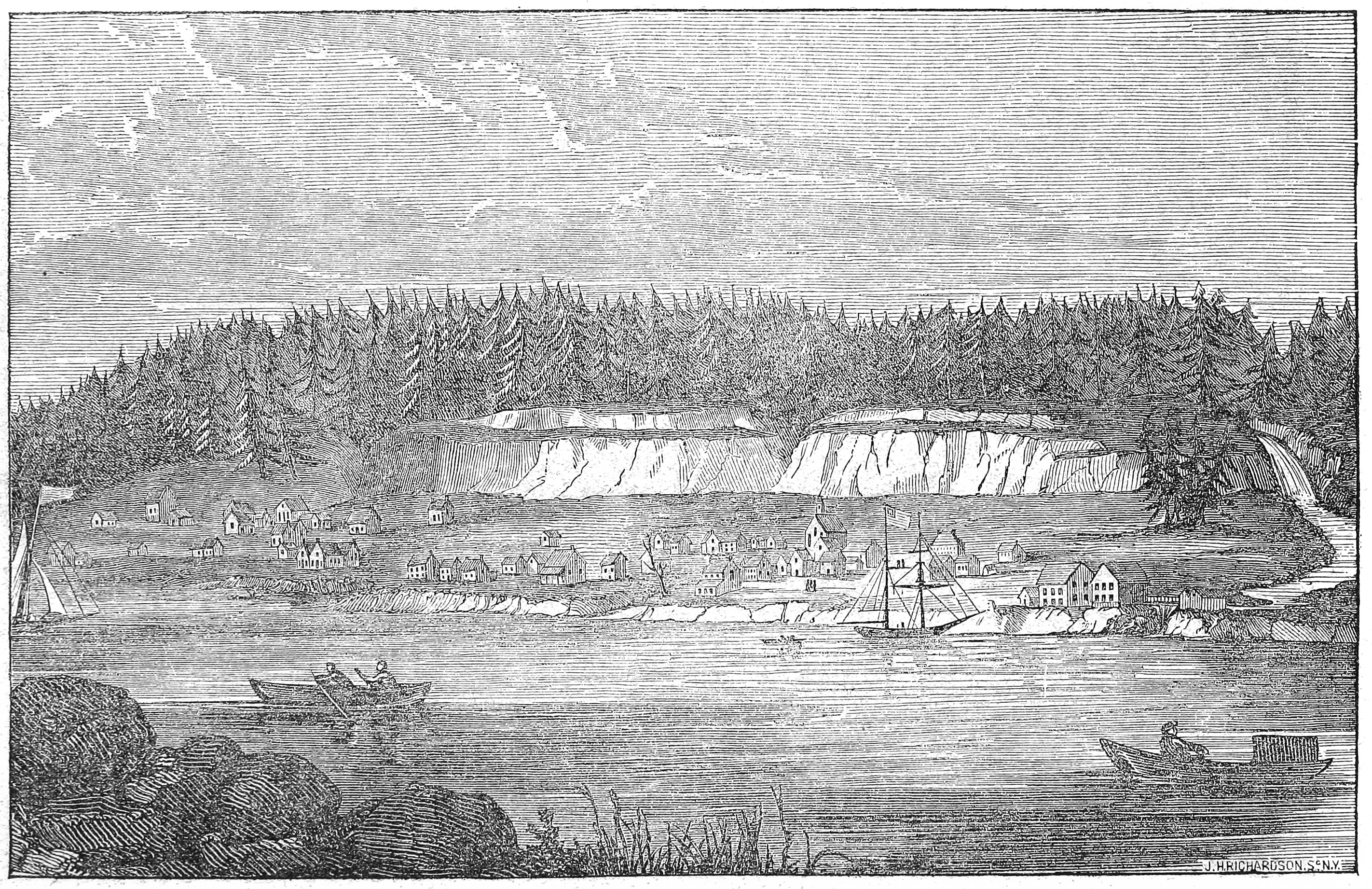
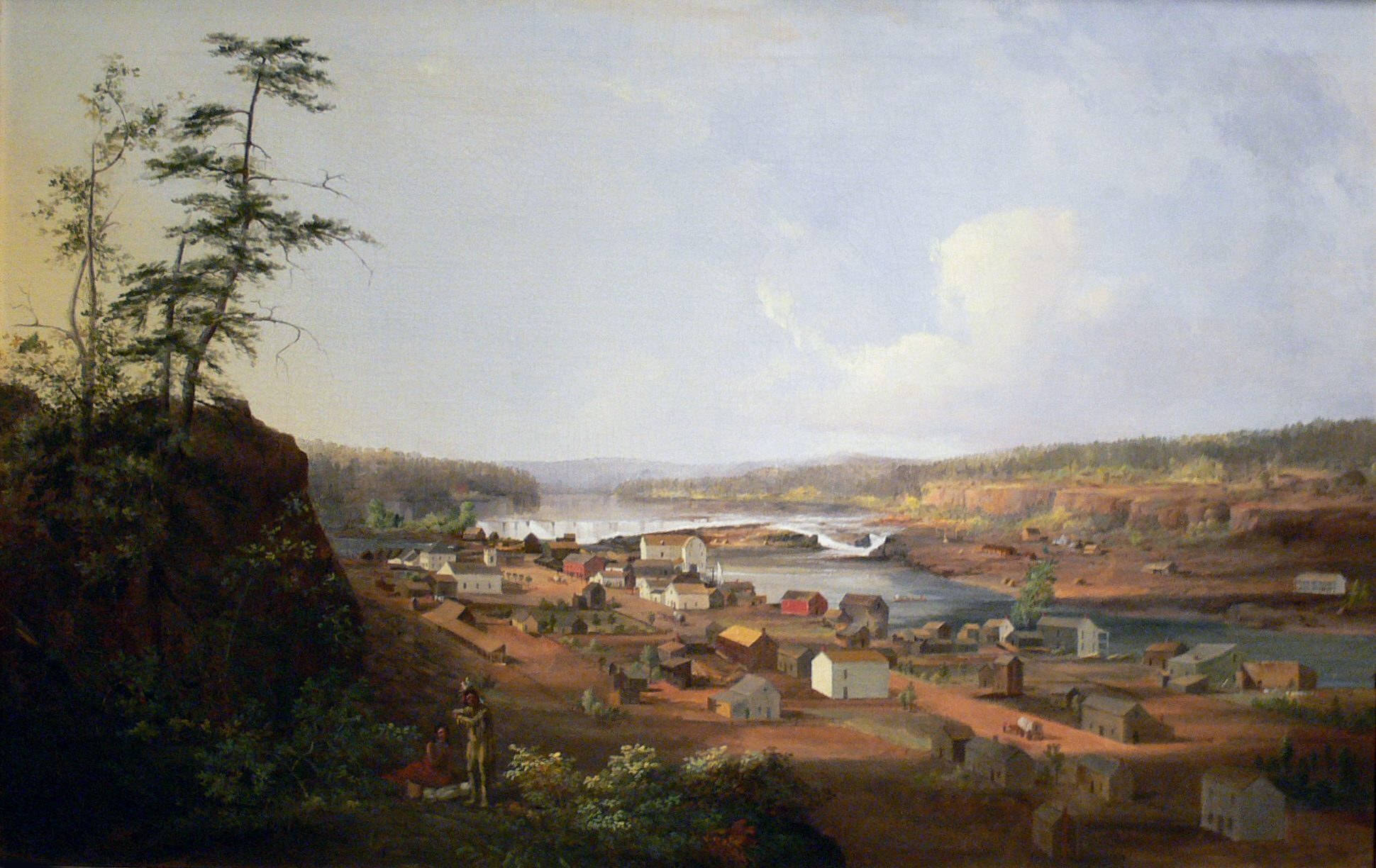
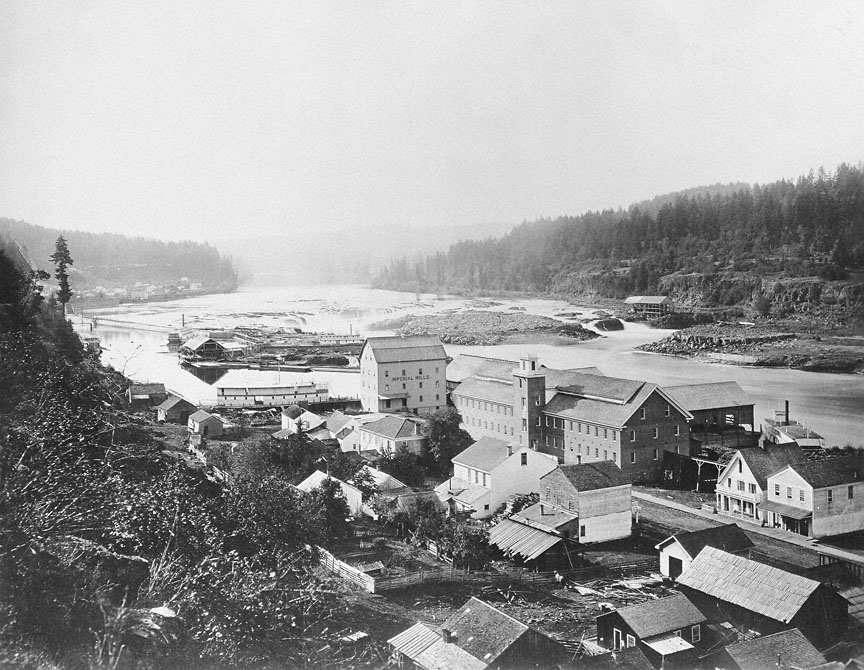
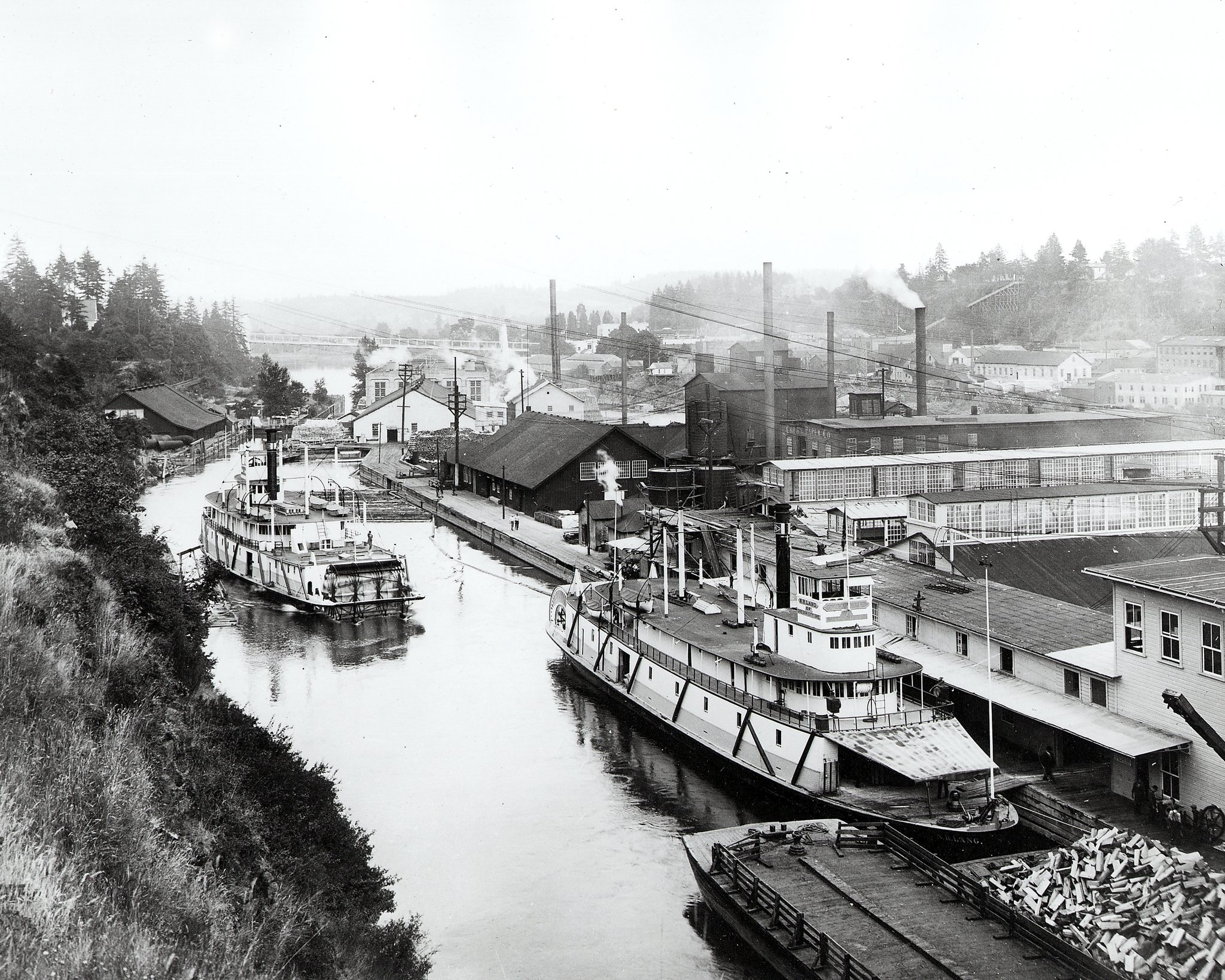
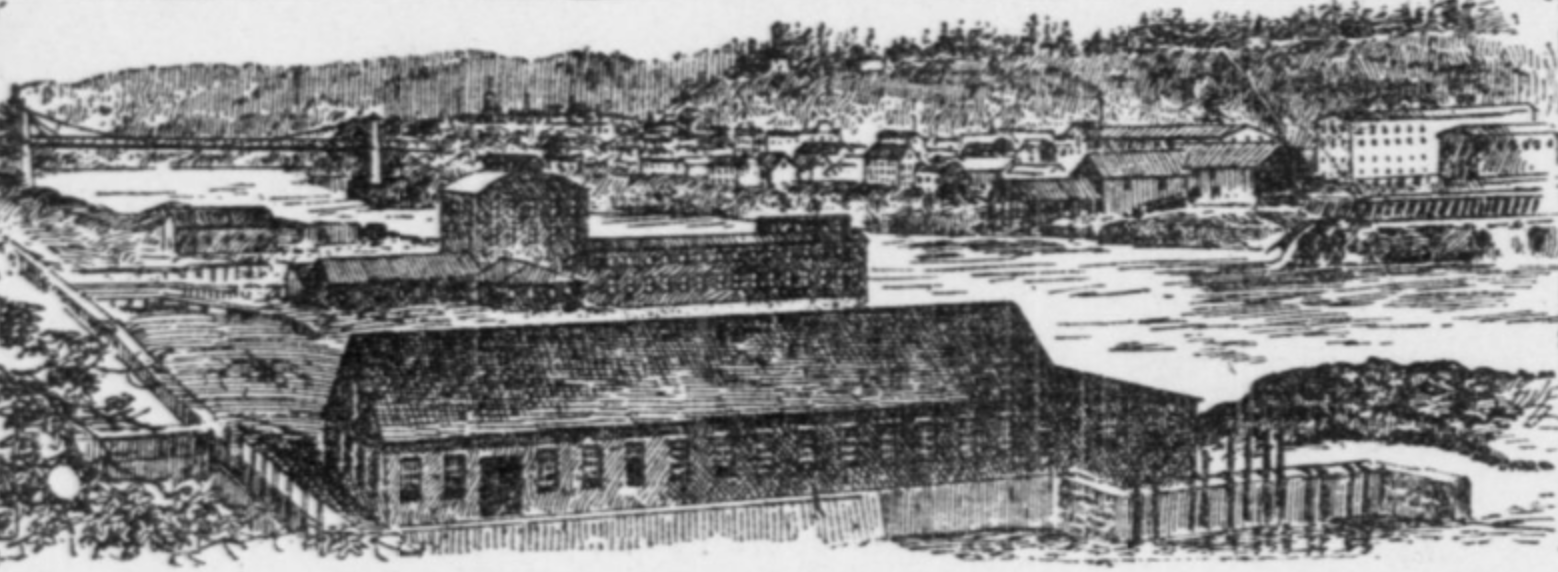
Images of the evolving town of Oregon City though the 19th century

== Geography ==
The town is divided into upper and lower areas. The lower area is on a bench next to the Willamette River. The upper area is atop a bluff composed of Canemah basalt, which flowed about 2.5 million years ago from a vent 7.5 miles (12 km) to the southeast in the Boring Lava Field. For many years, Indian trails connected the two levels, but stairs were built in the 19th century. In 1915, the town built the water-powered Oregon City Municipal Elevator to connect the two parts, which was converted to electricity in the 1920s. In 1952, a new electric elevator was constructed with the specification that it was to be "as plain as possible and without ornament."

According to the United States Census Bureau, the city has a total area of 9.29 square miles (24.06 km^{2}), of which 9.05 square miles (23.44 km^{2}) is land and 0.24 square miles (0.62 km^{2}) is water. The major waterways of Oregon City include the Willamette River, which flows along the northwest side of the city, and the Clackamas River, which merges with the larger Willamette to the north of the city. The Willamette forms the boundary between Oregon City and West Linn; the Clackamas serves as the boundary between Oregon City and Gladstone.

=== Willamette Falls ===
The Willamette Falls Locks in West Linn were the first multi-lift navigational locks in the United States and are now a National Historical Site, no longer in use. The first long-distance electrical service in the United States originated in Oregon City in 1889, transmitting electricity 14 miles (23 km) to Portland.

=== Climate ===
Climate chart for Oregon City

Oregon City has a Mediterranean climate (Köppen Csb). The Mediterranean climate regime resembles the climate of the lands in the Mediterranean Basin, parts of western North America, parts of Western and South Australia, southwestern South Africa, and parts of central Chile. The climate is characterized by hot, dry summers and cool, wet winters.

The average temperature throughout the year is 55.4 °F (13.0 °C), with the highest average temperature in July and August being 70.8 °F (21.6 °C), and December being the coldest month with an average temperature of 41.8 °F (5.4 °C). The annual precipitation is 44.81 inches (1,138 mm). It is mainly concentrated in winter (November to March), and the precipitation in July and August is obviously much less than in other months. In terms of temperature, there are 122 days with temperatures exceeding 70 °F (21 °C) per year, 18 days with temperatures exceeding 90 °F (32 °C), and one high-temperature day exceeding 100 °F (38 °C). However, there is no more than one ice day with the maximum temperature below 32 °F (0 °C) per year. Extreme temperatures range from −2 °F (−19 °C) on January 31, 1950, to 114 °F (46 °C) on June 28, 2021.

Climate data for Oregon City (1991−2020 normals, extremes 1948−present)
Month	Jan	Feb	Mar	Apr	May	Jun	Jul	Aug	Sep	Oct	Nov	Dec	Year
Record high °F (°C)	66 (19)	75 (24)	83 (28)	92 (33)	104 (40)	114 (46)	108 (42)	107 (42)	105 (41)	96 (36)	75 (24)	68 (20)	114 (46)
Mean maximum °F (°C)	59.2 (15.1)	62.8 (17.1)	71.2 (21.8)	80.5 (26.9)	87.6 (30.9)	92.7 (33.7)	97.6 (36.4)	97.7 (36.5)	92.0 (33.3)	79.4 (26.3)	65.0 (18.3)	58.5 (14.7)	100.7 (38.2)
Mean daily maximum °F (°C)	48.3 (9.1)	52.5 (11.4)	58.0 (14.4)	63.5 (17.5)	70.9 (21.6)	76.2 (24.6)	83.9 (28.8)	84.1 (28.9)	77.9 (25.5)	64.9 (18.3)	53.4 (11.9)	47.3 (8.5)	65.1 (18.4)
Daily mean °F (°C)	42.5 (5.8)	45.0 (7.2)	48.9 (9.4)	53.4 (11.9)	59.7 (15.4)	64.6 (18.1)	70.5 (21.4)	70.8 (21.6)	65.4 (18.6)	55.7 (13.2)	47.0 (8.3)	41.8 (5.4)	55.4 (13.0)
Mean daily minimum °F (°C)	36.7 (2.6)	37.5 (3.1)	39.8 (4.3)	43.3 (6.3)	48.4 (9.1)	52.9 (11.6)	57.0 (13.9)	57.5 (14.2)	52.9 (11.6)	46.5 (8.1)	40.5 (4.7)	36.3 (2.4)	45.8 (7.7)
Mean minimum °F (°C)	25.6 (−3.6)	27.2 (−2.7)	30.9 (−0.6)	33.8 (1.0)	39.1 (3.9)	44.9 (7.2)	49.8 (9.9)	48.7 (9.3)	43.7 (6.5)	35.6 (2.0)	29.6 (−1.3)	25.3 (−3.7)	21.1 (−6.1)
Record low °F (°C)	−2 (−19)	6 (−14)	22 (−6)	28 (−2)	31 (−1)	37 (3)	40 (4)	32 (0)	33 (1)	24 (−4)	9 (−13)	6 (−14)	−2 (−19)
Average precipitation inches (mm)	6.54 (166)	4.46 (113)	4.78 (121)	3.84 (98)	2.54 (65)	1.79 (45)	0.50 (13)	0.56 (14)	1.64 (42)	4.23 (107)	6.73 (171)	7.20 (183)	44.81 (1,138)
Average precipitation days (≥ 0.01 in)	15.8	11.9	15.2	13.5	10.1	6.7	2.6	2.4	5.2	10.0	14.5	14.8	122.7
Source: NOAA

== Economy ==
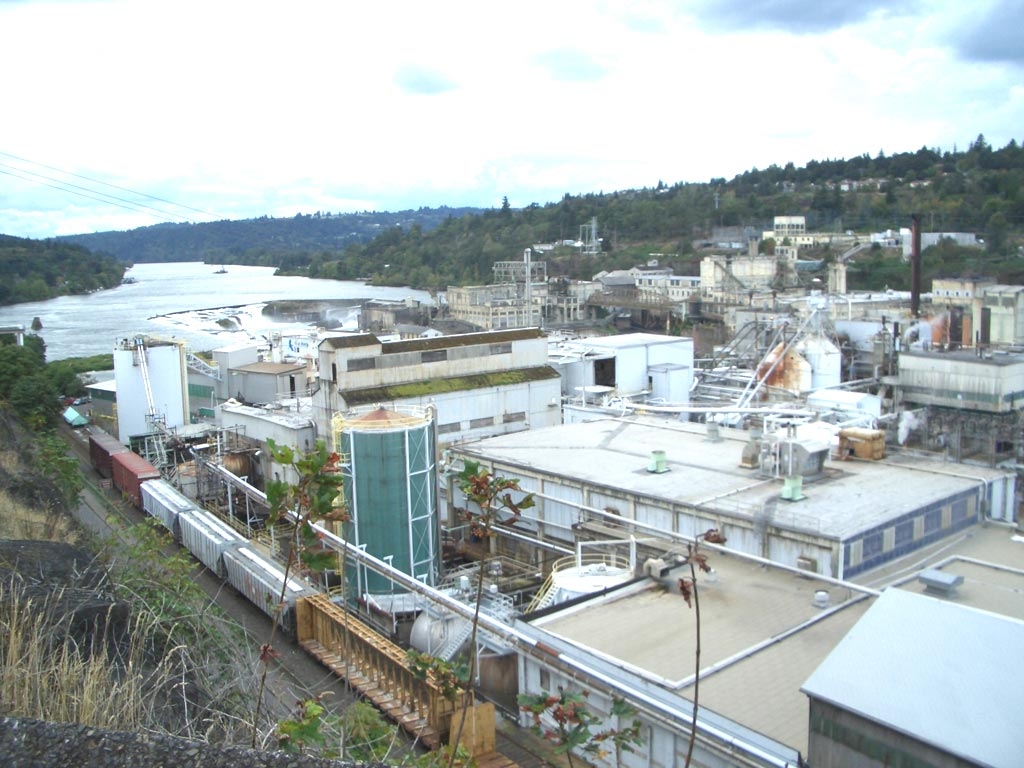
Willamette Falls and a paper mill at Oregon City, on the Willamette River

For much of its existence, Oregon City's economy has been dominated by the forestry industry, until the decline of the Pacific Northwest lumber industry started in the 1980s. At its height, several mills operated in the city and surrounding communities. The last paper mill in the immediate vicinity closed in 2017 but reopened in 2019 under new ownership.

With the growth of the Portland Metro region, Oregon City has become largely a suburb of Portland. Tourism is a growing sector with the emphasis on the city's history and the major renovation of the Willamette Falls area into a public-access, mixed-use space through the Willamette Falls Legacy Project.

== Government ==
Oregon City is governed by a Mayor and a City Commission composed of the Mayor and four Commissioners elected from the City at large for terms of four years each.

Oregon City was the capital of the Oregon Territory until 1851; the following governors served during that time:

- George Abernethy, provisional governor of the Oregon Country, 1845–1848
- Joseph Lane, first governor of the Oregon Territory, 1848–1850
- Kintzing Prichette, 2nd Territorial Governor of Oregon, 1850
- John P. Gaines, 3rd Territorial Governor of Oregon, 1850–1853. During his term (and against his wishes), the territorial capital of Oregon moved to Salem.

== Education ==
The city, and several surrounding communities, is served by the Oregon City School District, a public school district consisting of seven elementary schools, two middle schools, a traditional four-year high school (Oregon City High School), and an alternative secondary school. Several schools in the district offer bilingual English/Spanish programs. Oregon City High School is the third most populated high school in Oregon, and is a state and national power in girls' basketball, winning three consecutive USA Today girls' national championships in the 1990s.

The city also is the home of Clackamas Community College, numerous private and parochial schools, and a public library that is part of the Library Information Network of Clackamas County.

== Points of interest ==
=== Museums and historic buildings ===
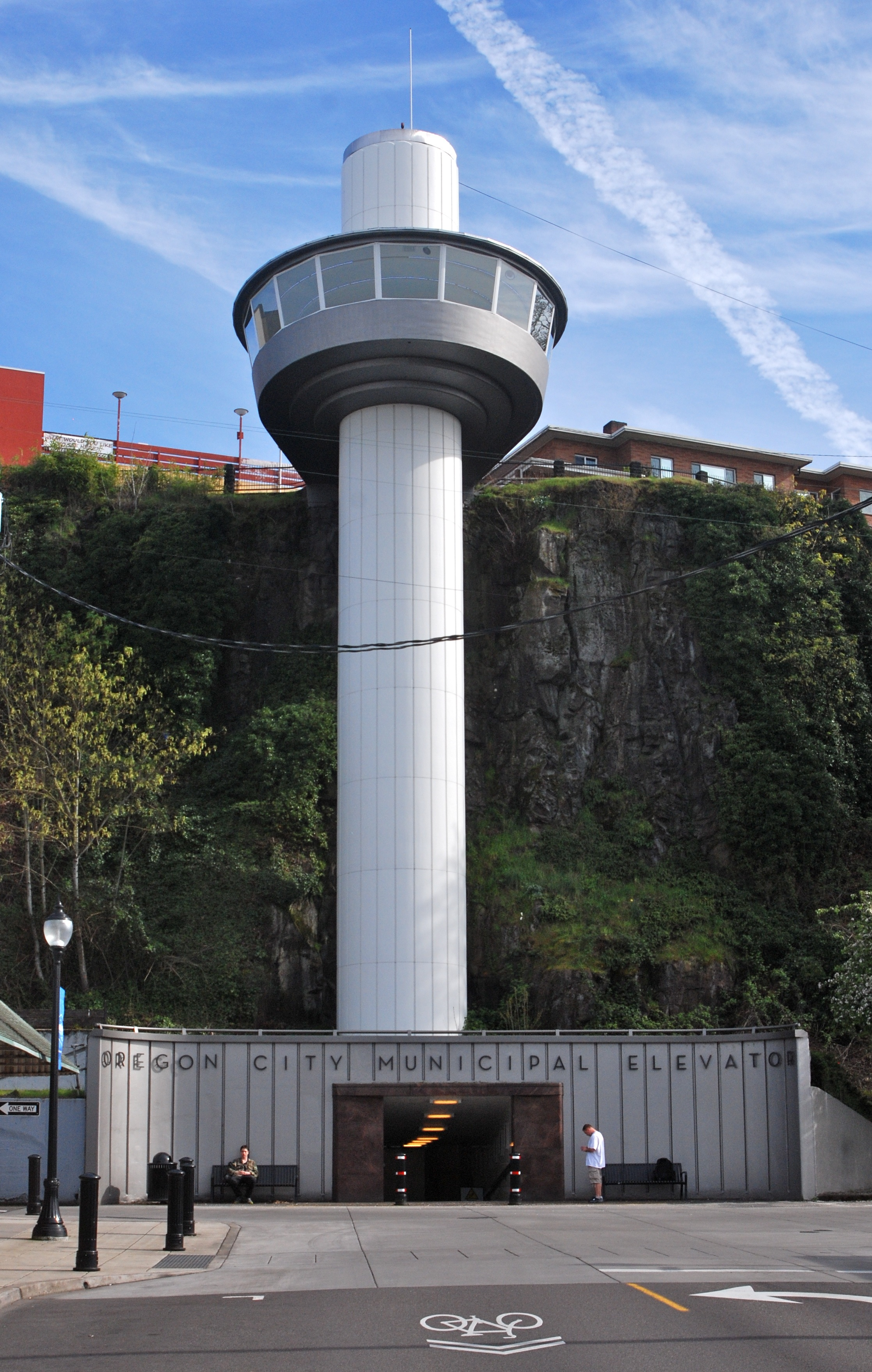
Municipal Elevator in Oregon City

Museums include the Museum of the Oregon Territory and the End of the Oregon Trail Interpretive Center, with costumed "living history" guides. The Clackamas County Historical Society archives, housed in the Museum of the Oregon Territory, also include the incorporation plat for the city of San Francisco. Clackamas Heritage Partners owns and operates these museums, along with the Stevens Crawford Museum. In 2009, Clackamas Heritage Partners announced that it could no longer afford to keep the museums open. The End of the Oregon Trail Interpretive Center was closed to the public indefinitely in September 2009; the Stevens Crawford Museum and Museum of the Oregon Territory, staffed largely by volunteers, continued to operate on a limited schedule. The End of the Oregon Trail Interpretive Center eventually reopened during the summer of 2013 with the support of grants and donations from numerous sources.

The Stevens-Crawford Heritage House Museum is a 1908 structure with 11 furnished rooms; exhibiting furniture from the collection of the Clackamas County Historical Society to replicate an Edwardian era home and Progressive Era narrative. Other historical buildings in Oregon City include the McLoughlin House, the Ermatinger House (oldest in Clackamas County), the Bank of Commerce Building, the Ainsworth House, the Harvey Cross House, the Oregon City Masonic Lodge, and the First Congregational Church.

The Oregon City Bridge over the Willamette River, built in 1922, is listed on the National Register of Historic Places, as is the Oregon City Municipal Elevator.

=== Parks ===
Oregon City has over 22 city parks. One of the city's larger parks is Clackamette Park, at the confluence of the Clackamas and Willamette Rivers. The park's features include RV camping, a boat launch and dock, a skateboard park, and other recreational facilities. Several community festivals are held there throughout the year. Other major parks include Chapin, Hillendale, Jon Storm Park, Rivercrest, and Wesley Lynn.

== Transportation ==
=== Road ===
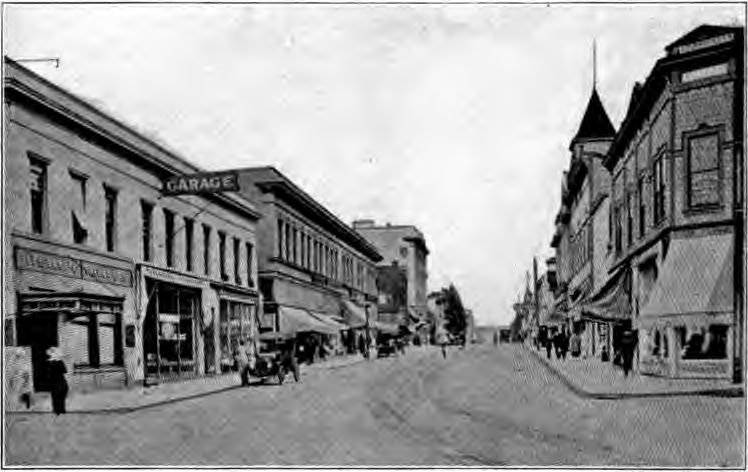
Main Street c. 1920

Interstate 205 passes through the city's northern edge, and is the only freeway to serve the city. In addition, three state highways (Oregon Route 43, Oregon Route 99E, and Oregon Route 213) pass through or terminate in Oregon City. The former two serve the city's downtown core, the latter provides service to the southern parts of Oregon City.

=== Rail ===
The Union Pacific Railroad mainline passes through the city. The city also has an Amtrak station, which is served twice daily in each direction by Amtrak Cascades trains running between Portland and Eugene, Oregon. The Coast Starlight (Seattle–Los Angeles) passes through but does not stop.

=== Air ===
There are no public airports within the city. A small private airfield is along Beavercreek Road, south of Oregon City. Oregon City is served by Portland International Airport, 15 miles (24 km) to the north, and by Portland-Mulino Airport, a general-aviation facility in the town of Mulino, approximately 15 miles (24 km) to the south.

=== Water ===
The Willamette River in Oregon City is navigable to small craft, and Oregon City has a thriving fishing and recreational boating industry. The Willamette Falls Locks once allowed boats to navigate around the falls. The Clackamas River is not navigable, except for the lowermost portions.

=== Mass transit ===
As part of the greater Portland metropolitan area, Oregon City is served by TriMet, the regional transit authority, with several bus lines which converge at the Oregon City Transit Center. Until 1958, an interurban trolley line operated by the now-defunct Portland Traction Company connected Oregon City with Portland; remnants of this line are still visible (such as an abandoned bridge across the Clackamas River, just east of the OR 99E bridge). In more recent years, the city operated a "historic trolley" service during the summer months, primarily to serve the needs of tourism, but the vehicles used were trolley-replica buses, rather than actual trolley cars, and in 2013 it was decided to discontinue that service and sell the vehicles.

Two other public agencies provide transit service in Oregon City, supplementing that of TriMet. The South Clackamas Transportation District (SCTD) operates a route between Clackamas Community College on the south east end of Oregon City to Molalla, about 18 miles (29 km) south on Oregon Route 213. Canby Area Transit (CAT) operates regular service on Oregon Route 99E between the Oregon City Transit Center and Canby. SMART, South Metro Area Regional Transit, serving Wilsonville, connects to CAT in Canby. CAT also has service to Woodburn.

Dial-a-Ride service is operated by TriMet, but CAT also operates within the Oregon City city limits for trips originating or terminating in the CAT service area. If transfers between TriMet and CAT are necessary, they are accomplished at the Oregon City Transit Center (OCTC) at 11th & Main, which is at the northeast end of the downtown area.

== Demographics ==
=== 2020 census ===
As of the 2020 census, Oregon City had a population of 37,572, and the median age was 38.2 years. 22.9% of residents were under the age of 18 and 15.4% of residents were 65 years of age or older. For every 100 females there were 95.9 males, and for every 100 females age 18 and over there were 94.4 males age 18 and over.

According to the 2020 census, 100.0% of residents lived in urban areas and 0% lived in rural areas.

There were 13,966 households in Oregon City, of which 34.1% had children under the age of 18 living in them. Of all households, 51.2% were married-couple households, 15.4% were households with a male householder and no spouse or partner present, and 24.6% were households with a female householder and no spouse or partner present. About 22.1% of all households were made up of individuals and 9.3% had someone living alone who was 65 years of age or older.

There were 14,478 housing units, of which 3.5% were vacant. Among occupied housing units, 64.9% were owner-occupied and 35.1% were renter-occupied. The homeowner vacancy rate was 0.8% and the rental vacancy rate was 4.4%.

Racial composition as of the 2020 census
Race	Number	Percent
White	30,961	82.4%
Black or African American	376	1.0%
American Indian and Alaska Native	314	0.8%
Asian	823	2.2%
Native Hawaiian and Other Pacific Islander	100	0.3%
Some other race	1,344	3.6%
Two or more races	3,654	9.7%
Hispanic or Latino (of any race)	3,445	9.2%

=== 2010 census ===
As of the census of 2010, there were 31,859 people, 11,973 households, and 8,206 families residing in the city. The population density was 3,520.3 inhabitants per square mile (1,359.2/km^{2}). There were 12,900 housing units at an average density of 1,425.4 per square mile (550.4/km^{2}). The racial makeup of the city was 91.1% White, 0.6% African American, 0.9% Native American, 1.7% Asian, 0.2% Pacific Islander, 2.3% from other races, and 3.1% from two or more races. Hispanic or Latino of any race were 7.3% of the population.

There were 11,973 households, of which 36.5% had children under the age of 18 living with them, 50.7% were married couples living together, 12.4% had a female householder with no husband present, 5.4% had a male householder with no wife present, and 31.5% were non-families. 23.5% of all households were made up of individuals, and 8.3% had someone living alone who was 65 years of age or older. The average household size was 2.61 and the average family size was 3.07.

The median age in the city was 36.3 years. 25.5% of residents were under the age of 18; 8.8% were between the ages of 18 and 24; 28.8% were from 25 to 44; 25.7% were from 45 to 64; and 11.2% were 65 years of age or older. The gender makeup of the city was 49.3% male and 50.7% female.

=== 2000 census ===
As of the census of 2000, there were 25,754 people, 9,471 households, and 6,667 families residing in the city. The population density was 3,163.9 inhabitants per square mile (1,221.6/km^{2}). There were 10,110 housing units at an average density of 1,242.0 per square mile (479.5/km^{2}). The racial makeup of the city was 92.44% White, 1.12% Asian, 1.08% Native American, 0.58% African American, 0.11% Pacific Islander, 2.15% from other races, and 2.53% from two or more races. Hispanic or Latino of any race were 4.98% of the population.

There were 9,471 households, out of which 36.6% had children under the age of 18 living with them, 53.0% were married couples living together, 12.3% had a female householder with no husband present, and 29.6% were non-families. 22.4% of all households were made up of individuals, and 7.8% had someone living alone who was 65 years of age or older. The average household size was 2.62 and the average family size was 3.06.

In the city, the population was spread out, with 27.0% under the age of 18, 10.3% from 18 to 24, 32.5% from 25 to 44, 20.5% from 45 to 64, and 9.7% who were 65 years of age or older. The median age was 33 years. For every 100 females, there were 96.8 males. For every 100 females age 18 and over, there were 94.7 males.

The median income for a household in the city was $45,531, and the median income for a family was $51,597. Males had a median income of $38,699 versus $29,547 for females. The per capita income for the city was $19,870. About 6.5% of families and 8.9% of the population were below the poverty line, including 11.0% of those under age 18 and 7.5% of those age 65 or over.

== Neighborhoods ==
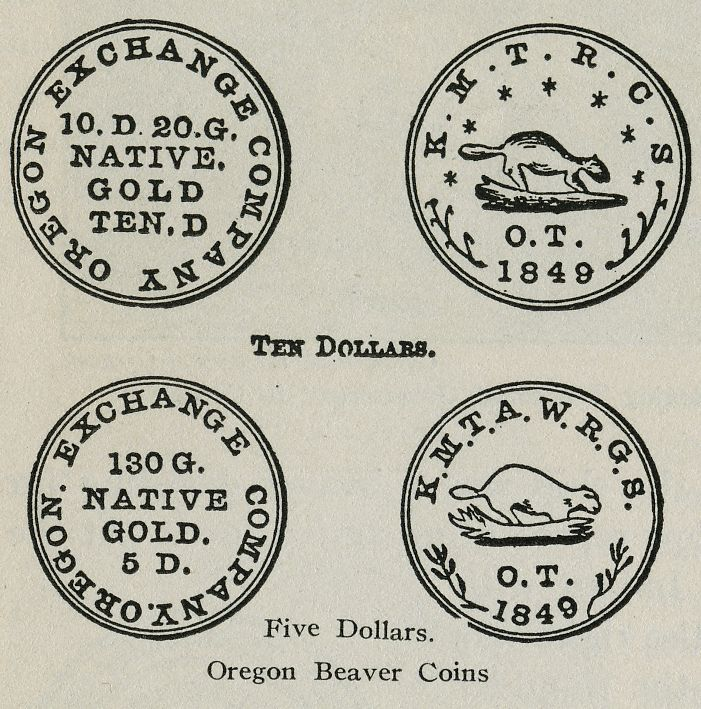
Sketch of $5 & $10 Beaver Coins

Oregon City has 12 officially recognized neighborhood associations:

- The Park Place neighborhood is in the Northeast on a bluff overlooking Abernethy Green. Formerly an independent community, Park Place was platted in 1889, and a post office was established the following year. For a while the name was changed to "Parkplace."
- The Two Rivers neighborhood is the lowest-elevation area of town and is primarily commercial, including downtown Oregon City, the End of the Oregon Trail Visitor Center at Abernethy Green, and Clackamette Park.

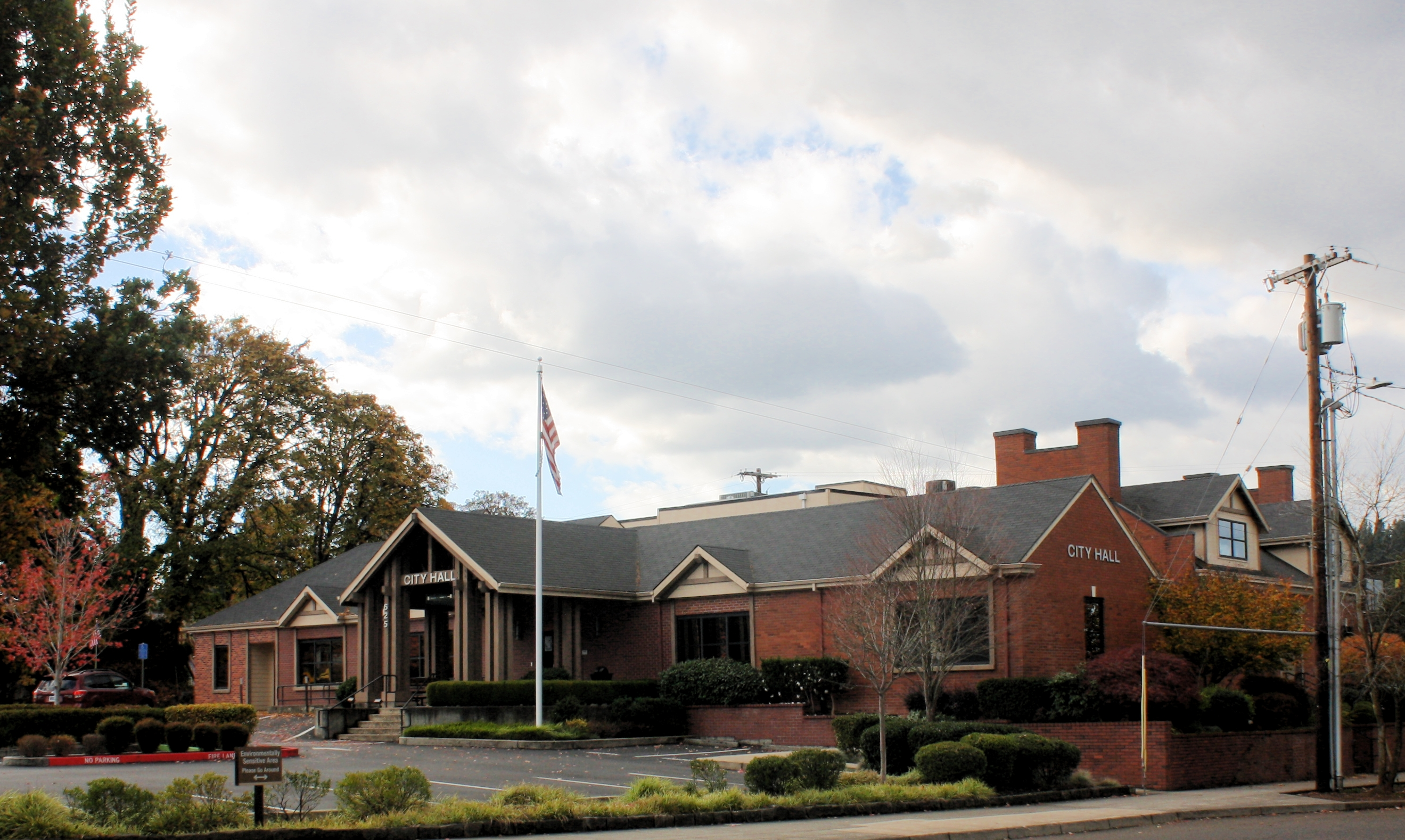
Oregon City City Hall

- The McLoughlin neighborhood is on a bluff overlooking downtown and includes many of the older homes in the City including designated sites like the John McLoughlin House. The McLoughlin Neighborhood also includes the public library, pool, and hospital.
- The Elyville neighborhood surrounds the Northern section of Molalla Avenue, the former route of Oregon Route 213 before it was moved to the Oregon City Bypass to the east. Elyville includes the historic Mountain View Cemetery where many of the oldest pioneer settlers are buried.
- The Canemah neighborhood lies along Oregon Route 99E, and is a narrow strip of land sandwiched between the Willamette River and a bluff. Canemah was founded in 1845 as an independent city before being annexed into Oregon City. It was the portage site around Willamette Falls for many years. It was supposedly named after an Indian chief.
- The Rivercrest neighborhood overlooks the Willamette River to the West.
- The South End neighborhood is in the Southwest.
- The Hazel Grove/Westling Farm neighborhood is on the Southern side of the city.
- The Tower Vista neighborhood is also in the South, East of Hazel Grove/Whistling Farm.
- The Hillendale neighborhood lies in the central part of the city and contains the Clackamas County government campus.
- The Gaffney Lane neighborhood lies south of Hillendale, centered around the elementary school of the same name.
- The Caufield neighborhood is the farthest southeast and includes Clackamas Community College and Oregon City High School.

== Notable people ==
In addition to John McLoughlin, the "Father of Oregon" and chief factor of the Hudson's Bay Company, and Vietnam-era Medal of Honor recipient Larry G. Dahl, Oregon City has been home to the following:

Oregon pioneers

- John C. Ainsworth (1822–1893), pioneer, businessman, steamship captain
- J. T. Apperson, steamboat captain, politician
- George H. Atkinson (1819–1889), pioneer, missionary, co-founder of Pacific University
- Asahel Bush (1824–1913), pioneer, printer, founder of the Salem Statesman Journal
- Tabitha Moffatt Brown (1780–1858), pioneer, co-founder of Pacific University
- John H. Couch (1811–1870), sea captain and trader
- Philip Foster (1805–1884), settler and businessman
- Amory Holbrook (1820–1866), mayor, attorney
- Robert Newell (1807–1869), fur trapper, mountain man, frontier doctor, newspaper editor, politician, Indian agent
- Peter Skene Ogden (1790–1854), explorer and fur trader
- Samuel Parker (1806–1886), politician, pioneer
- Peter G. Stewart (1809–1900), pioneer, politician, watchmaker
- William G. T'Vault (1806–1869), pioneer, postmaster, publisher
- Aaron E. Waite (1813–1898), pioneer, first chief justice of the state of Oregon
- Alvin F. Waller (1808–1872), pioneer, missionary

Political activists

- William Simon U'Ren (1859–1949), lawyer, known as the Father of the Oregon System of government.

Writers

- Jeffrey St. Clair (born 1959), journalist and author
- M. K. Hobson (born 1969), science fiction writer
- Kenneth Scott Latourette (1884–1968), historian
- Edwin Markham (1852–1940), American Poet Laureate

Performing artists

- Ron Saltmarsh (born 1962) Music composer
- Meredith Brooks (born 1958), singer/songwriter
- Louis Conrad Rosenberg (1890–1983), artist and architect
- Susan Ruttan (born 1948), actress
- Jack Taylor (born 1926), actor

Businesspeople

- Melville Eastham (1885–1964), businessman (founded General Radio Company), engineer, radio pioneer
- David Eccles (1849–1912), railroadman and businessman

Scientists

- James J. Brady (physicist) (1904–1993), a physicist on the faculty of Oregon State University and a Fellow of the American Institute of Physics.

Athletes

- Brian Burres (born 1981), major league baseball pitcher
- Jeff Charleston (born 1983), professional football player
- Ed Coleman (1901–1964), major league baseball player
- Rich Fellers (born 1959), Olympic equestrian
- Jeff Lahti (born 1956), major league baseball pitcher
- Matt Lindland (born 1970), Olympic silver medalist in wrestling, mixed martial artist
- Dan Monson (born 1961), basketball coach
- Jonah Nickerson (born 1985), pitcher for the Oregon State Beavers voted Most Outstanding Player of 2006 College World Series
- Dean Peters (1958–1998), professional wrestler, alias "Brady Boone"
- Brad Tinsley (1989–), basketball player
- Trevor Wilson (born 1966), former major-league pitcher for the San Francisco Giants and Anaheim Angels
- Lindsey Yamasaki (born 1980), professional women's basketball player

== Sister Cities ==
According to Sister Cities International, Oregon City has one sister city:

- Tateshina, Nagano, Japan

== See also ==
- Canemah, Oregon
- Cayuse Five
- Steamboats of the Willamette River
- USS Oregon City
