= Oregon Route 43 =

State highway in northwestern Oregon, US

Oregon Route 43
- Route 43 highlighted in red

Route information
- Maintained by ODOT
- Length: 11.60 mi (18.67 km)
- Existed: 1939–present

Major junctions
- South end: OR 99E in Oregon City
- I-205 in West Linn
- North end: I-5 / US 26 in Portland

Location
- Country: United States
- State: Oregon

Highway system
- Oregon Highways; Interstate; US; State; Named; Scenic
← OR 42	→ OR 46

Oregon Route 43 is an Oregon state highway that runs between the cities of Oregon City and Portland, mostly along the western flank of the Willamette River. While it is technically known by the Oregon Department of Transportation as the Oswego Highway No. 3 (see Oregon highways and routes), on maps it is referred to by its route number or by the various street names it has been given.

== Route description ==
The southern terminus of Oregon Route 43 is at a junction with Oregon Route 99E in downtown Oregon City. From there, it runs east for two blocks, along the couplet of Main and Railroad streets, and then turns north and crosses the Willamette River on the historic Oregon City Bridge, entering the city of West Linn. Almost immediately on the West Linn side of the river is an interchange with Interstate 205. It continues north through West Linn (where it is called Willamette Drive), providing service to numerous neighborhoods and business districts. Due to constrained geography (the city is mostly located on the sides of a steep slope) and encroaching homes and businesses, the route is only a two-lane road in many stretches.

North of West Linn, the highway passes by Marylhurst University, and enters the city of Lake Oswego. In the southern portions of Lake Oswego, Route 43 is given the street name of Pacific Highway, a designation that usually refers to Oregon Route 99 (the highway is a historic routing of U.S. Route 99). Soon after, the route crosses over Oswego Creek and enters downtown Lake Oswego, where it is known as South State Street (between McVey Avenue and A Avenue) and North State Street (between A Avenue and Terwilliger Boulevard). The Willamette Shore Trolley begins just south of A Avenue across from the Millennium Plaza Park on South State Street, and parallels Oregon Route 43 as both head north into Portland.

North of downtown Lake Oswego, OR 43 acquires the name South Riverside Drive, and enters a three-lane section (two main lanes and a climbing lane) as it climbs over a hill overlooking the Willamette River. This stretch of OR 43 passes by some of the most exclusive and wealthy neighborhoods (Dunthorpe, Riverwood, Riverdale) in the Portland area. The highway soon enters the city of Portland, where it is known as South Macadam Avenue.

Macadam Avenue passes alongside the river for several miles, sandwiched between the river on the east and River View Cemetery on the west. It also passes near (and provides access via South Palatine Hill Road to) Lewis & Clark College. Near the northern end of the cemetery is an interchange with the Sellwood Bridge, at which point OR 43 becomes a four-lane divided thoroughfare. Soon afterwards, the highway enters the Johns Landing neighborhood, a narrow strip of homes, parks and businesses located between the river and Interstate 5, high on the hill above it. The area is home to Oregon Public Broadcasting and the Portland offices and studios of Clear Channel Communications, as well as a local landmark, The Water Tower. Oregon Route 43 and the freeway run parallel for several miles until an interchange with I-5 and U.S. Route 26 near the Ross Island Bridge.

== History ==
What is now Oregon Route 43 was once the original route of U.S. Route 99 in the south Portland area. Now, Oregon Route 99E is routed on the east side of the river (through Oregon City, Gladstone, and Milwaukie); and OR 99W is routed further west (through Tigard, Sherwood, and Newberg).

Oregon Route 212, which used to run as far west as the Sherwood/King City area, was concurrent with Oregon Route 43 across the Oregon City/West Linn bridge. This old alignment of OR 212 still exists, running west along Willamette Falls Drive, just north of the bridge (and just south of the interchange with I-205), continuing on to Tualatin.

The Oregon Department of Transportation offered a $3.5 million payment to Clackamas County if it agreed to take over a 6-mile (9.7 km) section of OR 43, but was rejected. ODOT also abandoned plans to transfer sections of the highway to Multnomah County and the City of Portland.

== Major intersections ==
County	Location	mi	km	Destinations	Notes
Clackamas	Oregon City	11.55	18.59	Main Street	
Clackamas	Willamette River	11.55– 11.39	18.59– 18.33	Oregon City Bridge	
Clackamas	West Linn	11.35	18.27	Willamette Falls Drive – Willamette area	Former routing of OR 212
Clackamas	West Linn	11.29– 11.13	18.17– 17.91	I-205 – Salem	Exit 8 on I-205
Multnomah	Portland	2.71	4.36	Sellwood Bridge	Interchange; to OR 99E
Multnomah	Portland	0.60	0.97	To I-5 north – South Waterfront	Southbound U-turn ramp
Multnomah	Portland	0.59	0.95	I-5 south – Salem	Interchange; southbound exit and northbound entrance; exit 299A on I-5
Multnomah	Portland	0.13	0.21	I-5 north to I-84 east – Seattle	Interchange; northbound exit and southbound entrance; exit 299A on I-5
Multnomah	Portland	0.08	0.13	I-5 south / US 26 east (Ross Island Bridge) – Salem	Northbound u-turn ramp
Multnomah	Portland	0.00	0.00	US 26 west – City Center	Interchange
1.000 mi = 1.609 km; 1.000 km = 0.621 mi: Incomplete access

== See also ==
- The Macadamized Road Company was promoted in 1863 by Henry W. Corbett, the Starr brothers, William S. Ladd, John Green, Cicero Hunt Lewis, and Henry Failing.
- Macadam, the type of road construction used for the original Macadam Avenue
