= List of libraries in Oregon =

The following is a list of libraries in state of Oregon.

== Public libraries ==
A complete list of all public libraries in Oregon. This excludes library districts.

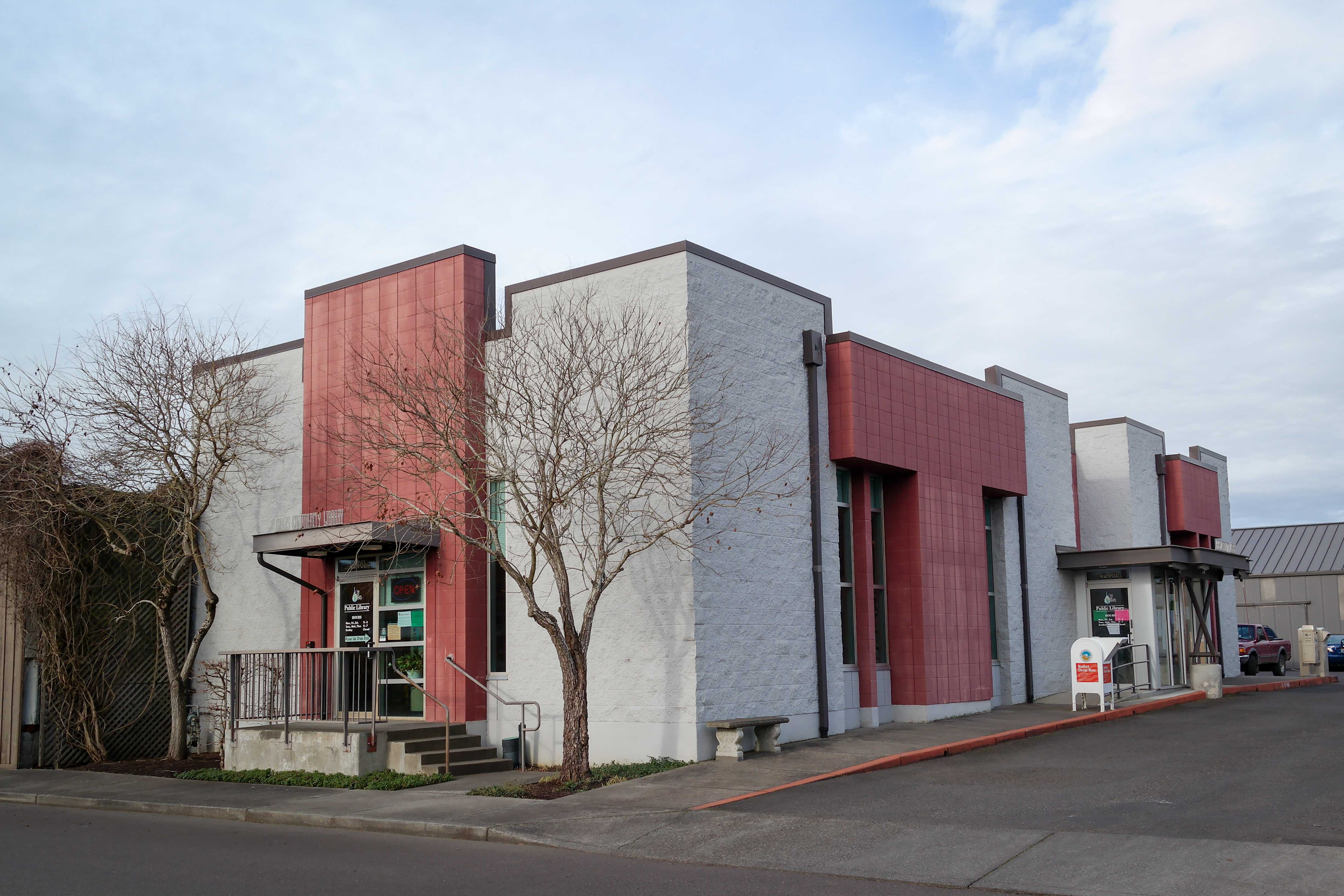
Banks Public Library

- Adams Public Library, Adams
- Albany Public Library (Oregon), Albany
- Aloha Community Library, Aloha
- Amity Public Library, Amity
- Arlington Public Library (Oregon), Arlington
- Astoria Public Library, Astoria
- Athena Public Library, Athena
- Baker County Public Library, Baker City
- Bandon Public Library, Bandon
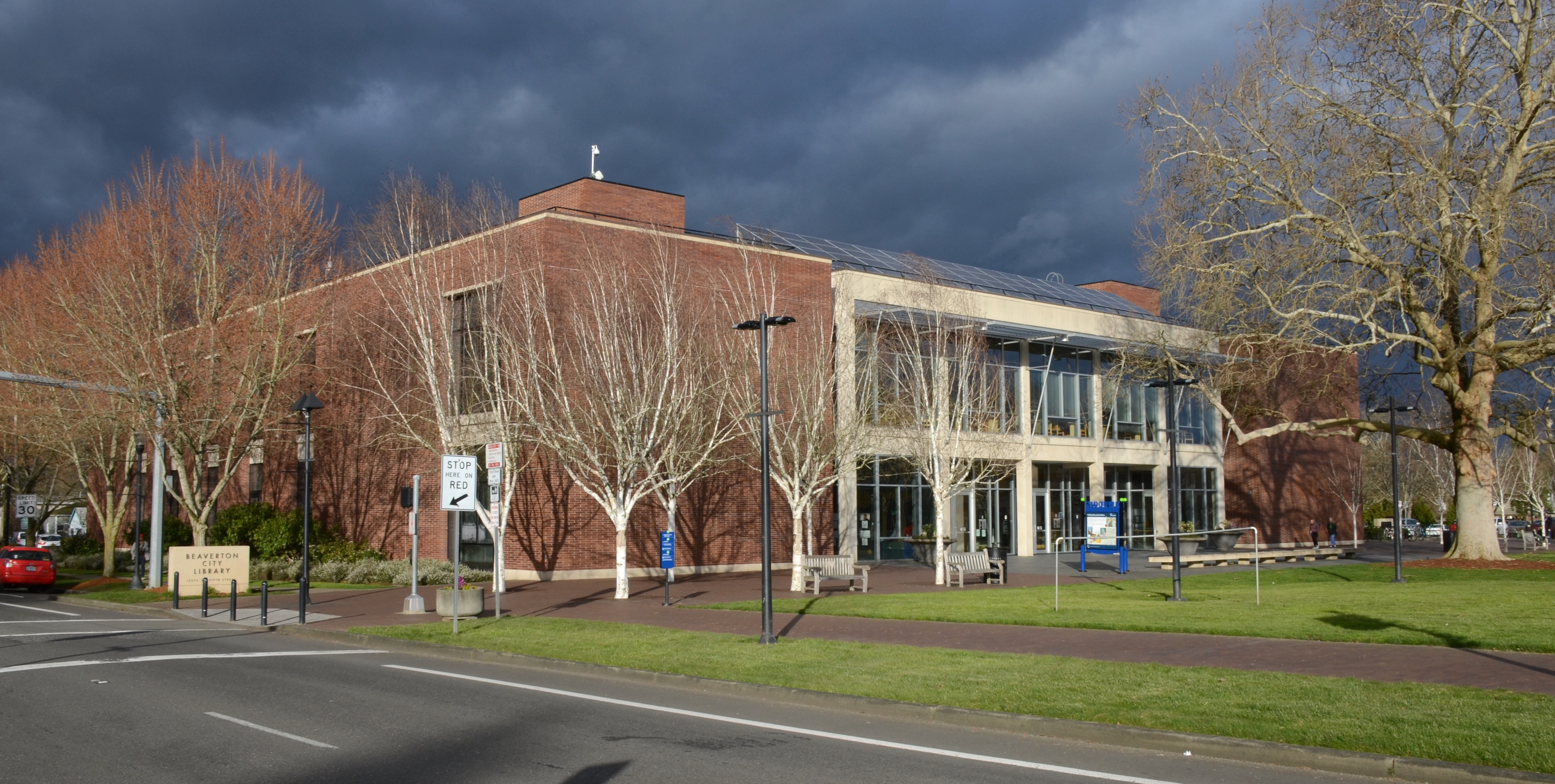
- Beaverton City Library
  Banks Public Library, Banks
- Bethany-Cedar Mill Library, Washington County
- Beaverton City Library, Beaverton
- Beaverton-Murray Scholls Library, Beaverton
- Brownsville Community Library, Brownsville
- Cedar Mill Community Library, Washington County
- Chetco Community Public Library, Brookings
- Curry Public Library, Gold Beach
- Harney County Library, Burns
- Canby Public Library, Canby
- Gilliam County Library, Condon
- Coos Bay Public Library, Coos Bay
- Coquille Public Library, Coquille
- Cornelius Public Library, Cornelius
- Corvallis-Benton County Public Library, Corvallis
- Cottage Grove Library, Cottage Grove
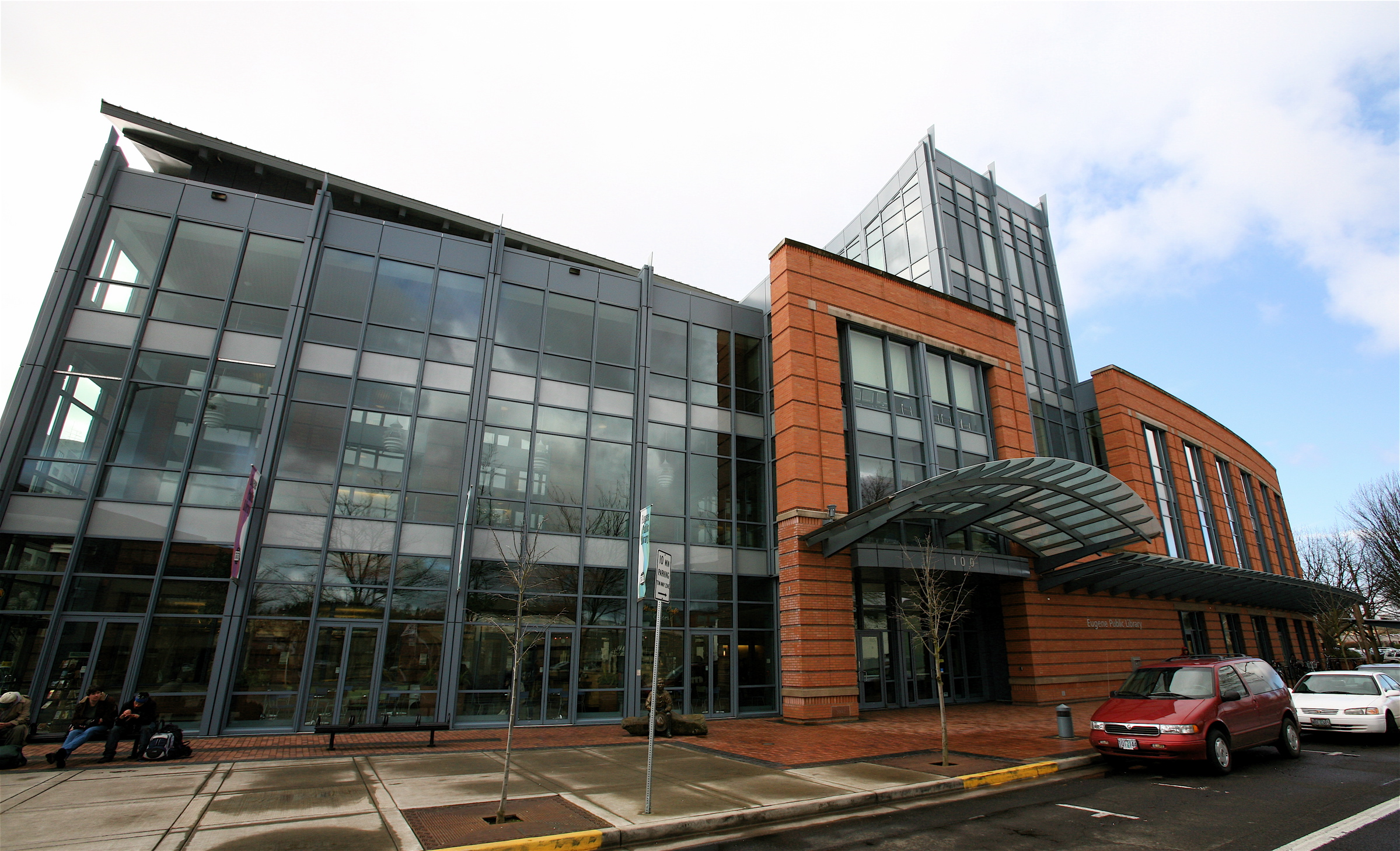
- Eugene Public Library
  Dallas Public Library, Dallas
- Mary Gilkey Library, Dayton
- Deschutes Public Library (Oregon), Bend
- Dufur Community Library, Dufur
- Echo Public Library, Echo
- Elgin Public Library, Elgin
- Enterprise Public Library, Enterprise
- Estacada Public Library, Estacada
- Eugene Public Library, Eugene
- Wagner Community Library, Falls City
- Forest Grove City Library, Forest Grove
- Fossil Public Library, Fossil
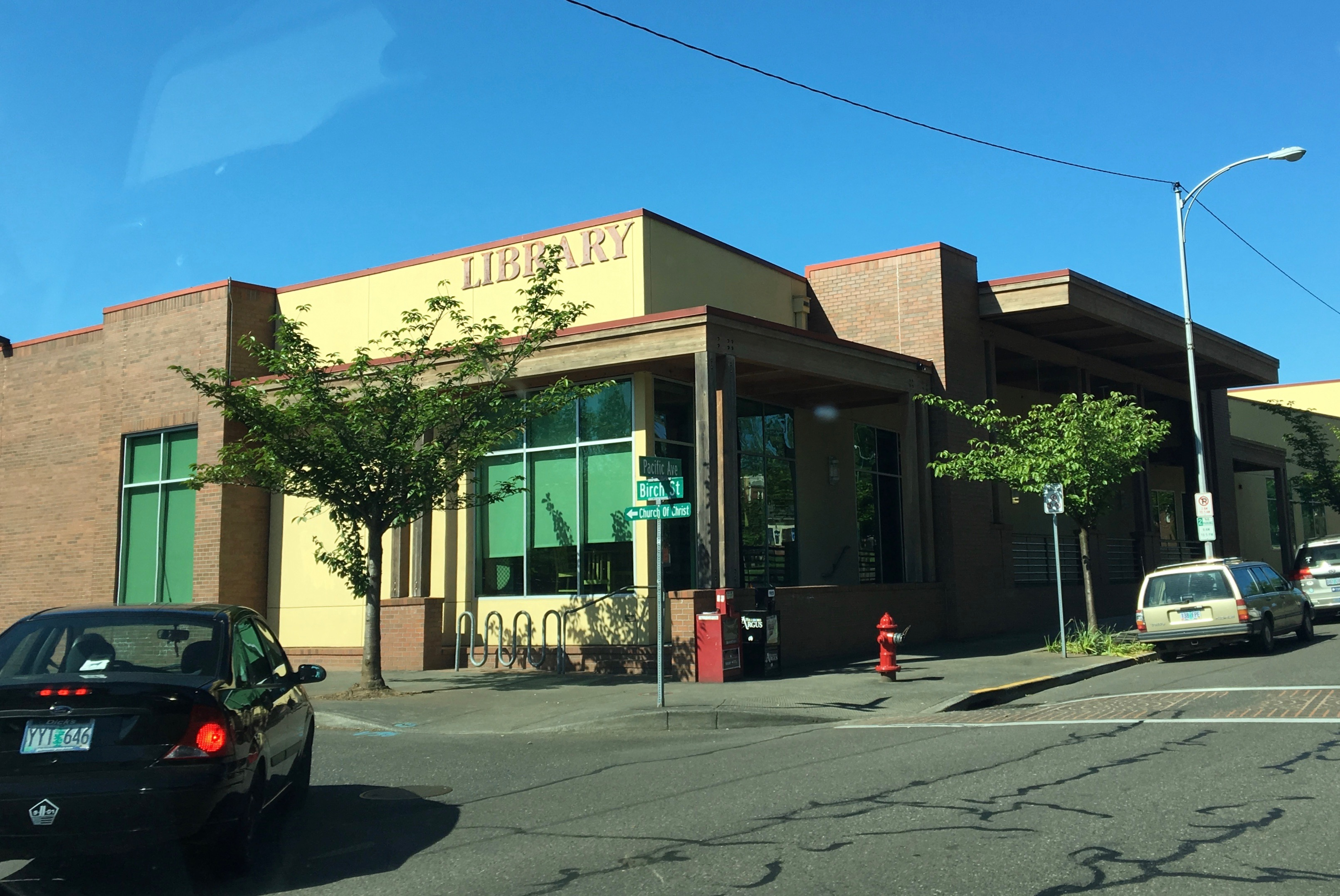
- Forest Grove City Library
  Garden Home Community Library, Garden Home
- Gladstone Public Library, Gladstone
- Josephine County Library, Grants Pass
- Harrisburg Public Library, Harrisburg
- Helix Public Library, Helix
- Hermiston Public Library, Hermiston
- Hillsboro Public Library, Hillsboro
- Hillsboro Public Library, Shute Park Branch, Hillsboro
- Tuality Health Education Center, Hillsboro
- Independence Public Library (Oregon), Independence
- Jefferson Public Library, Jefferson
- Grant County Library, John Day
- Joseph City Library, Joseph
- Junction City Public Library, Junction City
- Klamath County Library, Klamath Falls
- Cook Memorial Library, La Grande
- Lake Oswego Public Library, Lake Oswego
- Lakeside Public Library, Lakeside
- Lake County Library, Lakeview
- Langlois District Library, Langlois
- Lebanon Public Library, Lebanon
- Driftwood Public Library, Lincoln City
- Lowell Public Library, Lowell
- Lyons Public Library, Lyons
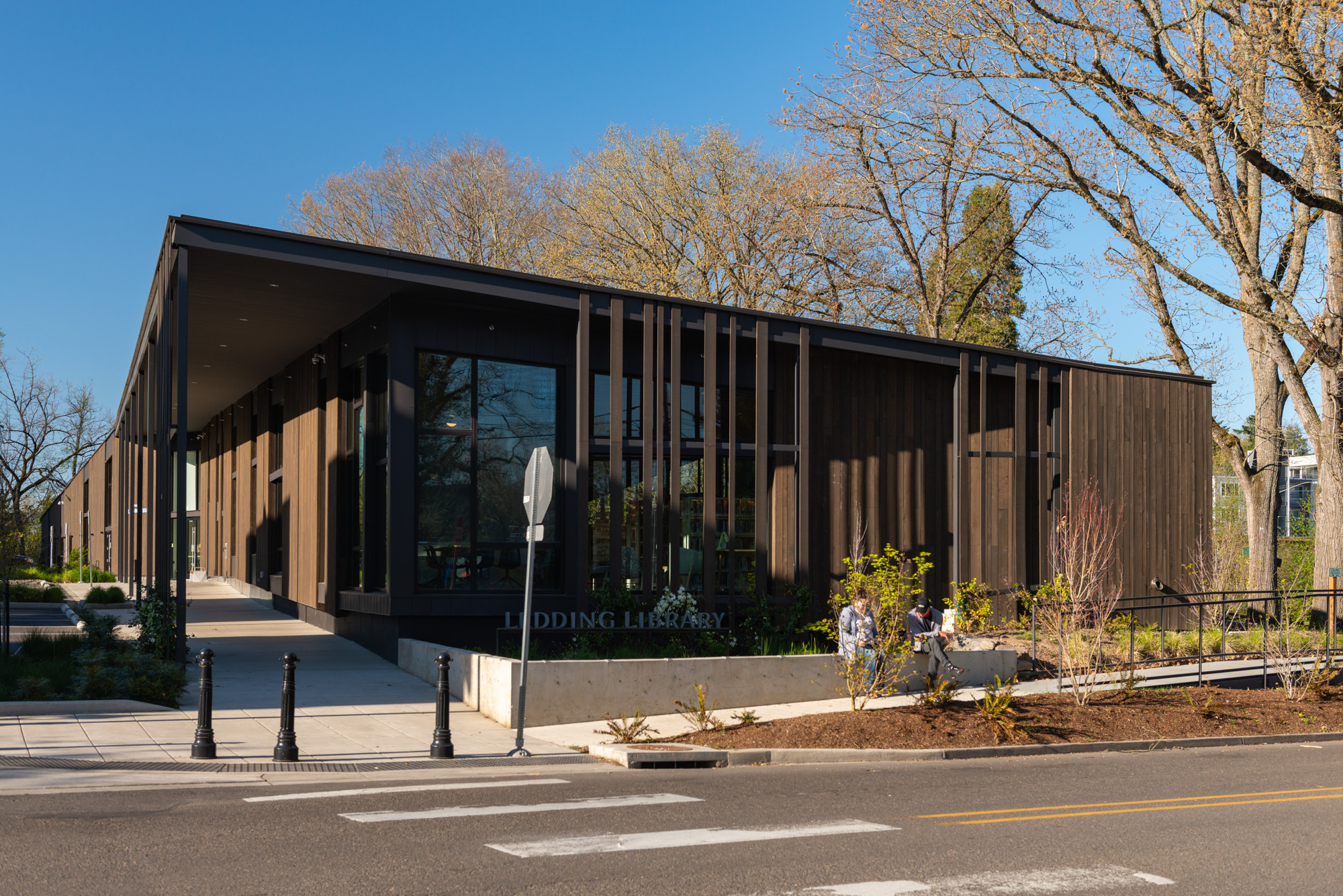
- Ledding Library in Milwaukie
  Jefferson County Library, Madras
- Southern Wasco County Library, Maupin
- McMinnville Public Library, McMinnville
- Milton-Freewater Public Library, Milton-Freewater
- Ledding Library, Milwaukie
- Molalla Public Library, Molalla
- Monmouth Public Library, Monmouth
- Sherman County Public Library, Moro
- Mt. Angel Public Library, Mount Angel
- Dora Public Library, Myrtle Point
- Flora M Laird Memorial Library, Myrtle Point
- Newberg Public Library, Newberg
- Newport Public Library, Newport
- North Bend Public Library, North Bend
- North Plains Public Library, North Plains
- North Powder Public Library, North Powder
- Nyssa Public Library, Nyssa
- Pendleton Public Library, Pendleton
- Pilot Rock Public Library, Pilot Rock
- Port Orford District Library, Port Orford
- Hazel M. Lewis Library, Powers
- Crook County Library, Prineville
- Oakridge Public Library, Oakridge
- Ontario Community Library, Ontario
- Oregon City Public Library, Oregon City
- Rainier City Library, Rainier
- Douglas County Library, Roseburg
- St. Helens Public Library, St. Helens
- Salem Public Library, Salem
- Sandy Public Library, Sandy
- Scappoose Public Library, Scappoose
- Scio Public Library, Scio
- Seaside Public Library, Seaside
- Sheridan Public Library, Sheridan
- Sherwood Public Library, Sherwood
- Spray Public Library, Spray
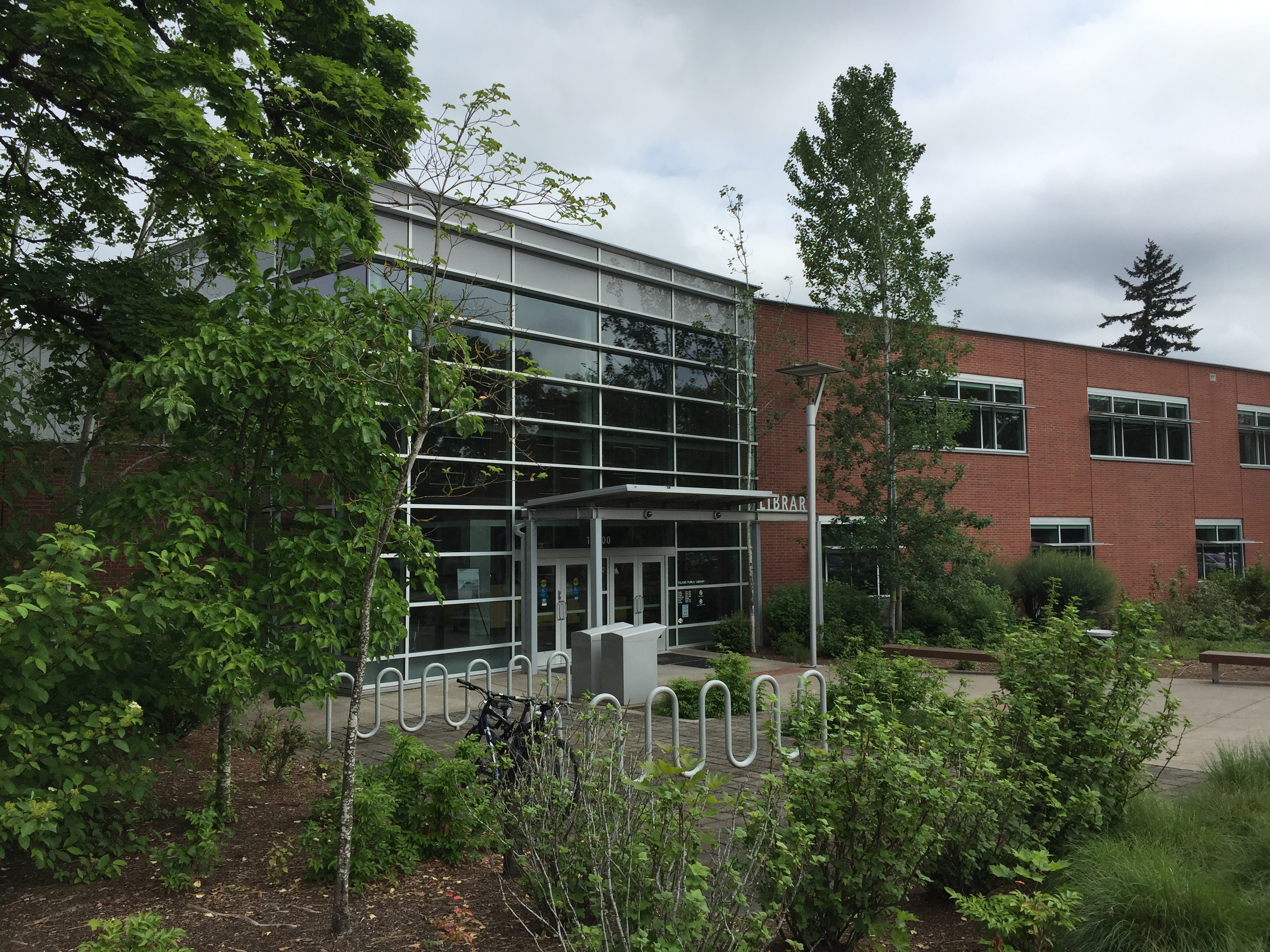
- Tigard Public Library
  Springfield Public Library, Springfield
- Stanfield Public Library, Stanfield
- Stayton Public Library, Stayton
- Clackamas County Library, Sunnyside
- Sweet Home Public Library, Sweet Home
- The Dalles-Wasco County Library, The Dalles
- Tigard Public Library, Tigard
- Tillamook County Library, Tillamook
- Toledo Public Library, Toledo
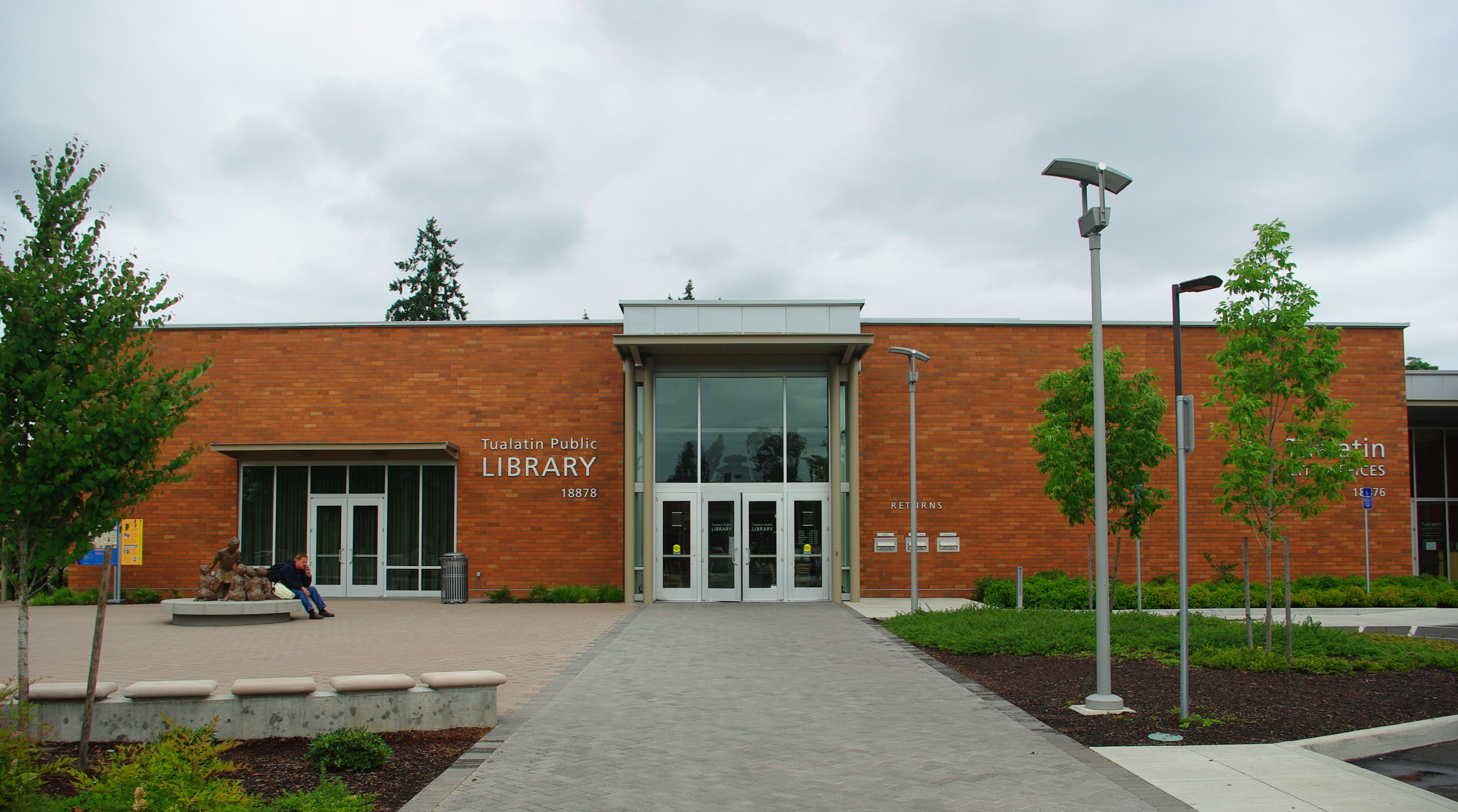
- Tualatin Public Library
  Tualatin Public Library, Tualatin
- Ukiah Public Library, Ukiah
- Umatilla Public Library, Umatilla
- Union Carnegie Public Library, Union
- Emma Humphrey Library, Vale
- Vernonia Public Library, Vernonia
- Waldport Public Library, Waldport
- Wallowa Public Library, Wallowa
- Warrenton Community Library, Warrenton
- West Linn Public Library, West Linn
- West Slope Community Library, Washington County
- Weston Public Library, Weston
- Willamina Public Library, Willamina
- Wilsonville Public Library, Wilsonville
- Woodburn Public Library, Woodburn
- Yachats Public Library, Yachats

=== Multnomah County ===
The following libraries are part of the Multnomah County Library system.

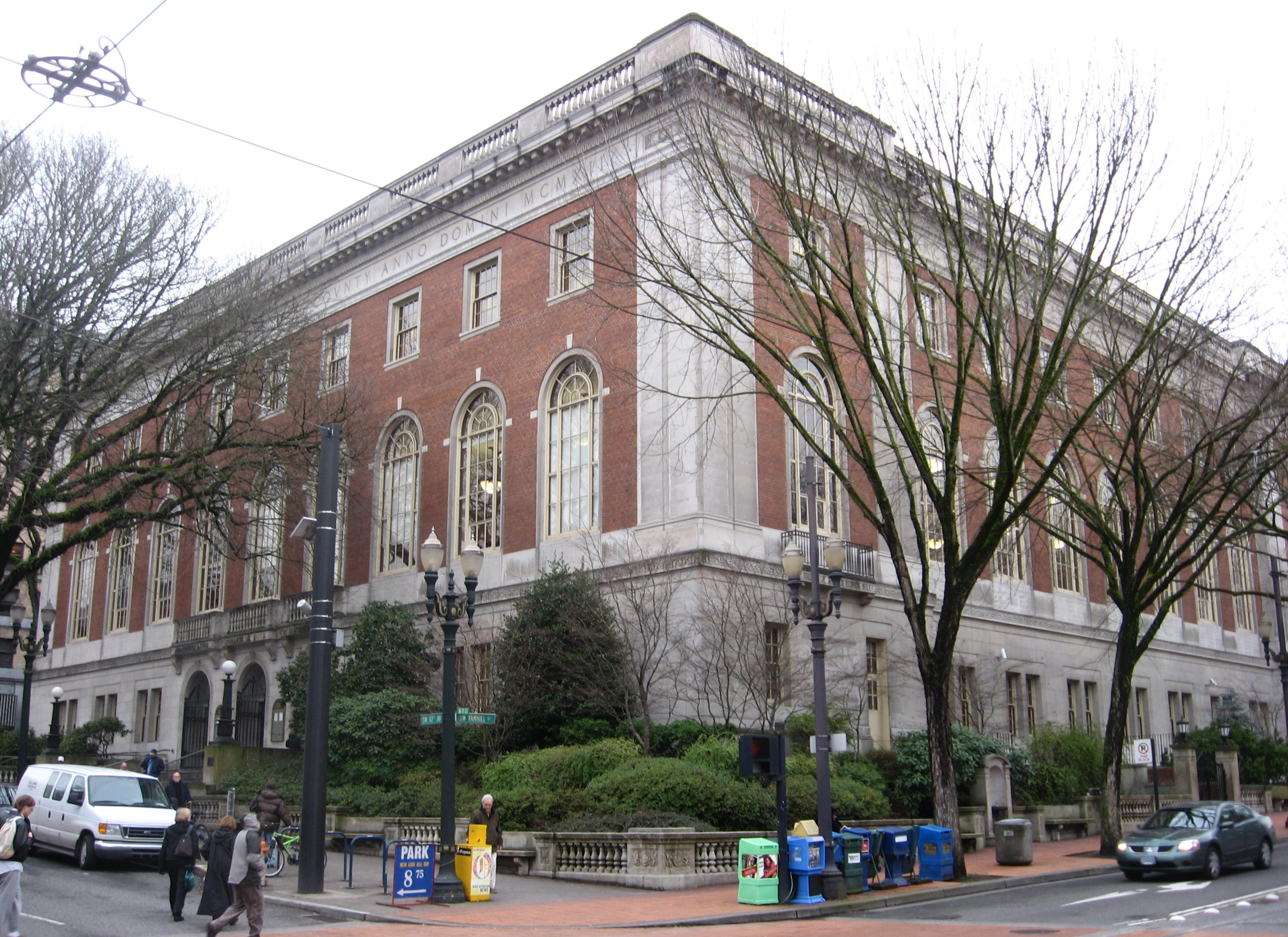
- Portland Central Library
  Albina Library
- Belmont Library
- Capitol Hill Library
- Central Library
- Fairview-Columbia Library
- Gregory Heights Library
- Gresham Library
- Hillsdale Library
- Holgate Library
- Hollywood Library
- Kenton Library
- Midland Library
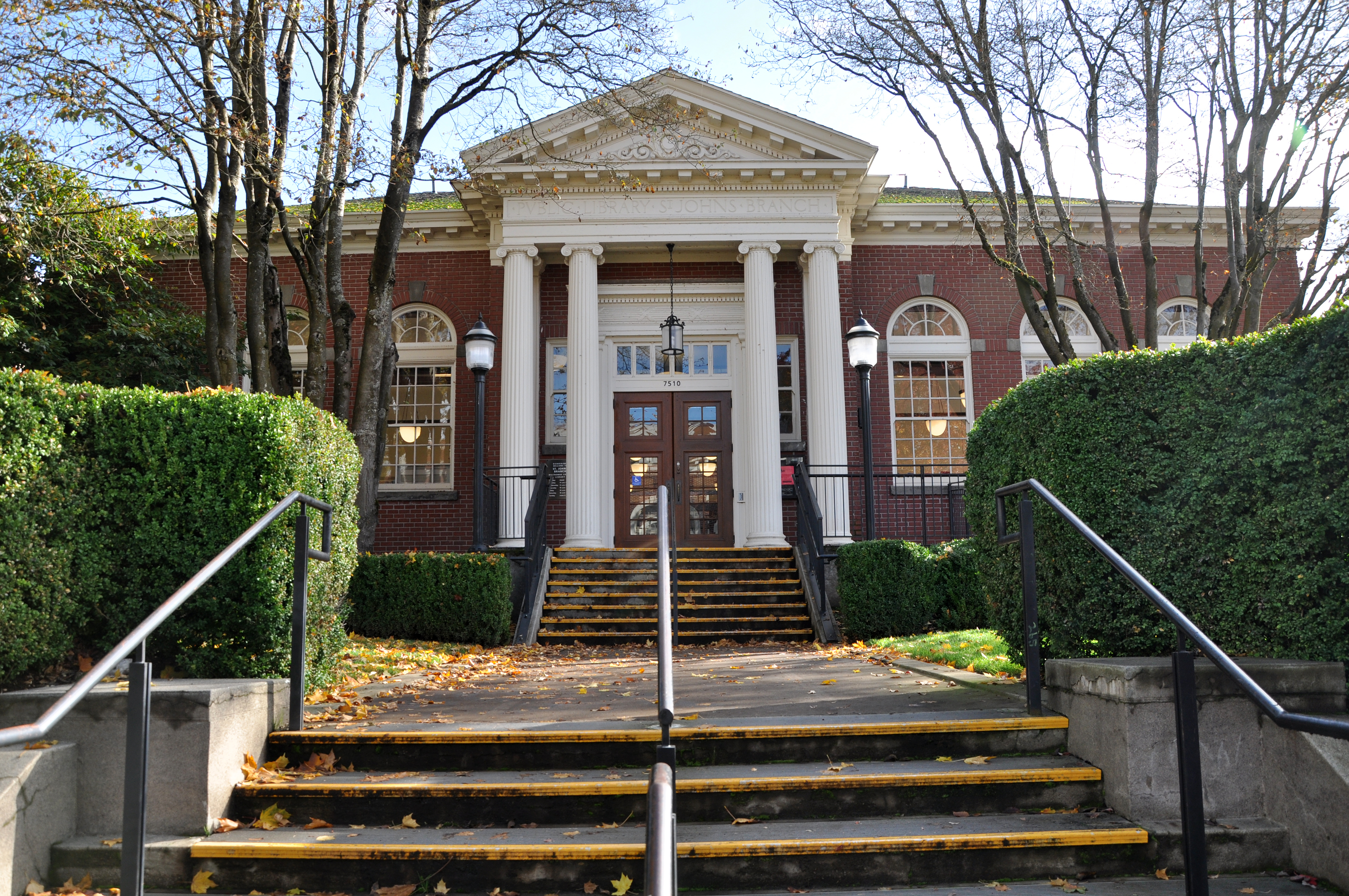
- St. Johns Library
  North Portland Library
- Northwest Library
- Rockwood Library
- Sellwood-Moreland Library
- St. Johns Library
- Troutdale Library
- Woodstock Library

as of June 2018.

== Academic libraries ==
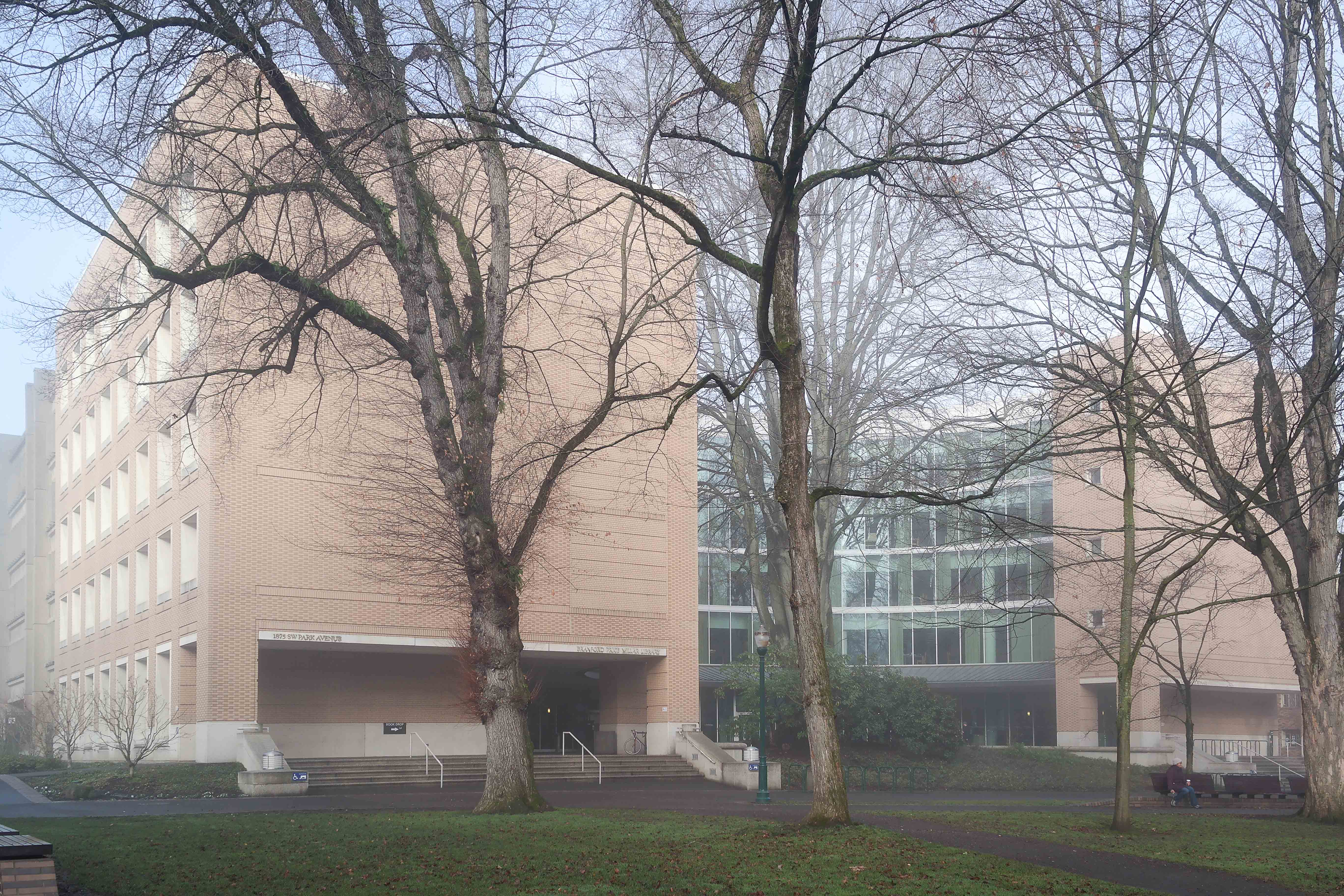
Branford Price Millar Library at Portland State University

- Clackamas Community College CCC Library, Clackamas
- Concordia University FWJ Sylwester Library, Portland
- Eastern Oregon University Pierce Library, La Grande
- Lewis & Clark College Aubrey Watzek Library, Portland
- Oregon State University Libraries
  - The Valley Library, Corvallis
- Portland State University Branford Price Millar Library, Portland
- Reed College Library, Portland
- Southern Oregon University Hannon Library, Ashland
- University of Oregon Libraries
  - Knight Library, Eugene
- University of Portland Clark Library, Portland
- Western Oregon University Hamersly Library, Monmouth
- Willamette University Libraries
  - Mark O. Hatfield Library, Willamette University, Salem
  - Pacific Northwest College of Art Albert Solheim Library, Portland

== Others ==
- Oregon Historical Society Research Library, Portland
- State Library of Oregon, Salem
- State of Oregon Law Library, Salem

== See also ==
- List of Carnegie libraries in Oregon
- Library Information Network of Clackamas County
- List of libraries in the United States
- Oregon Library Association
- Books in the United States
