= Washington County Cooperative Library Services =

- Type: Library system
- Established: 1975

Other information
- Website: www.wccls.org

Washington County Cooperative Library Services (WCCLS) is the library system serving Washington County, Oregon, United States. WCCLS distributes tax funds to libraries. It was established in 1975.

== Libraries ==
WCCLS is made up of 16 libraries which are operated by 13 cities and non-profit organizations.

Library	Operator
Aloha Community Library	Aloha Community Library Association
Banks Public Library	City of Banks
Beaverton City Library	City of Beaverton
Beaverton-Murray Scholls Library	City of Beaverton
Cedar Mill Community Library	Cedar Mill Community Library Association
Bethany-Cedar Mill Library	Cedar Mill Community Library Association
Cornelius Public Library	City of Cornelius
Forest Grove City Library	City of Forest Grove
Garden Home Community Library	Garden Home Community Library Association
Hillsboro Brookwood Library	City of Hillsboro
Hillsboro Shute Park Library	City of Hillsboro
North Plains Public Library	City of North Plains
Sherwood Public Library	City of Sherwood
Tigard Public Library	City of Tigard
Tualatin Public Library	City of Tualatin
West Slope Community Library	Washington County (Supported by the Friends of West Slope Community Library)

Libraries that were formerly affiliated with WCCLS included ones in the former Tanasbourne Mall (before the Tanasbourne area was incorporated) and, in the 1970s, Aloha Park Library, located in Aloha Park school (now known as Aloha-Huber Park), which was open to the public one night a week.

In 2019, the Oregon College of Art & Craft Library closed along with the rest of the college. Additionally, the Tuality Health Resource Center closed in August. These specialty libraries had been affiliated with WCCLS for many years, and some of their collection was distributed to other libraries in the county.

== See also ==
- Library Information Network of Clackamas County
- Multnomah County Library
