= Forest City Library =

Forest City Library may refer to:

- Forest Grove City Library, a library in Forest Grove, Oregon
- Forest City Public Library, a historic building located in Forest City, Iowa
- Forest City Library, a branch of the Live Oak Public Libraries in Georgia
