= Tigard =

Tigard may refer to:

- Tigard, Oregon
  - Tigard Transit Center
- Tigard-Tualatin School District
- Tigard Public Library
- Tigard High School
- Tigard (animal), a tiger/leopard hybrid
