= Skyport Airport =

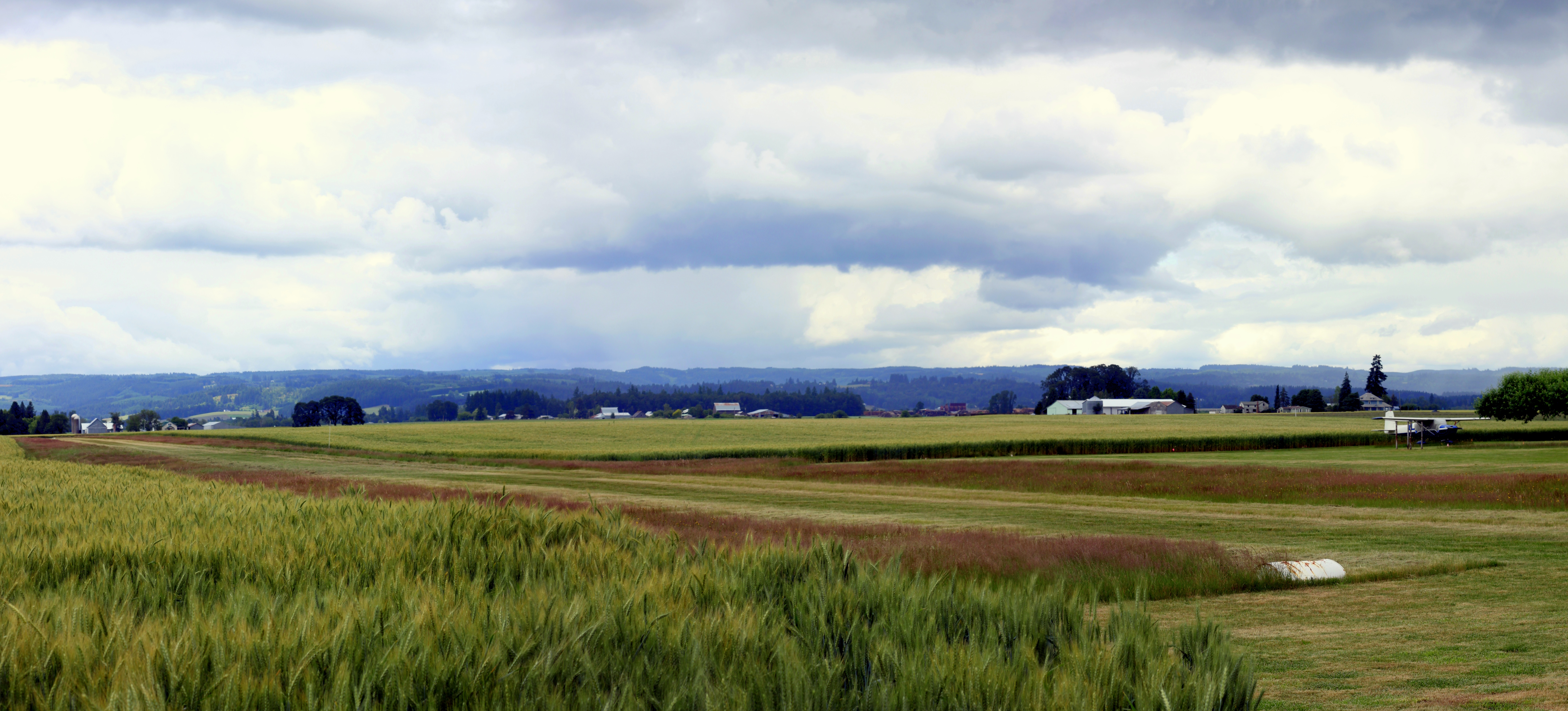
- Turf and local plane
- IATA: none; ICAO: none; FAA LID: 4S4

Summary
- Airport type: Public
- Owner/Operator: V. D. Putman
- Serves: Cornelius, Oregon
- Elevation AMSL: 174 ft / 53 m
- Coordinates: 45°34′57″N 123°03′10″W
- Interactive map of Skyport Airport

Runways
Direction	Length		Surface
Direction	ft	m	Surface
16/34	2,000	610	Turf/gravel

Statistics (2010)
- Aircraft operations: 2,000
- Based aircraft: 3
- Source: Federal Aviation Administration

Skyport Airport (FAA LID: 4S4) is a public use airport located three nautical miles (6 km) north of the central business district of Cornelius, a city in Washington County, Oregon, United States. It is privately owned and managed by V. D. Putman.

== Facilities and aircraft ==
Skyport Airport covers an area of 8 acres (3.2 ha) at an elevation of 174 feet (53 m) above mean sea level. It has one runway designated 16/34 with a turf and gravel surface measuring 2,000 by 45 feet (610 x 14 m).

For the 12-month period ending February 24, 2010, the airport had 2,000 general aviation aircraft operations, an average of 166 per month. At that time there were 3 aircraft based at this airport, all single-engine.
