= Sherwood Public Library =

Library in Sherwood, Oregon, U.S.

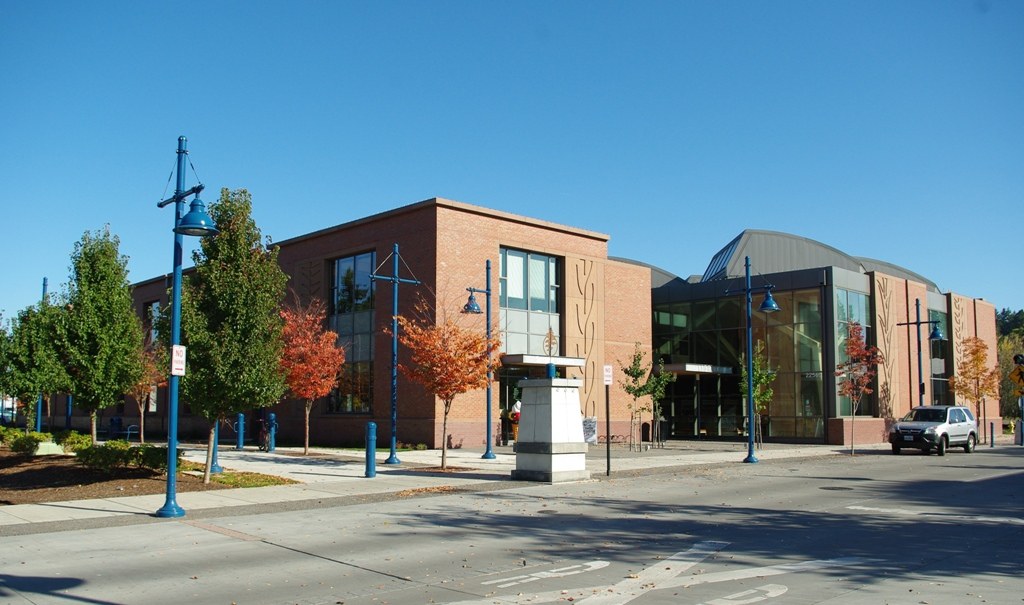
- The library in 2008
- 45.3568°N 122.840079°W
- Location: Sherwood, Oregon, United States
- Established: 1935
- Branch of: Washington County Cooperative Library Services

Other information
- Website: sherwoodoregon.gov/library

Sherwood Public Library is the library serving Sherwood in the U.S. state of Oregon. Operated by the city, it is a member of the Washington County Cooperative Library Services. Established in 1935, it has an annual circulation of around 370,000 items.

== History ==
The Sherwood library was started in 1935 in a drugstore, initially with a single shelf. The city took over the library in 1969, which by then had been moved to a house. The city moved it to the basement of City Hall, then located in the Morback House. In 1976, Sherwood's Friends of the Library was started. The friends group started raising funds for a new library in 1981. Groundbreaking on the new building was on May 22, 1985, after raising $106,000. The new, 3,500-square-foot (330 m^{2}) building designed by Terry Tollen opened in December 1985 on North Sherwood Boulevard. This was the first dedicated library building in Sherwood.

In January 2005, construction began on a new Civic Center that would include space for a new library. The city sold the old library building in October 2005 to the Sherwood Presbyterian Church for $657,000. The new library opened in January 2006.

== Facilities and services ==
The library building is a two-story, brick and glass-faced structure with 47,500 square feet (4,410 m^{2}). It was designed by Thomas Hacker Architects Inc. and constructed by Howard S. Wright Construction. Features include study areas, a fireplace, a community room, and computer areas. The total cost for the Civic Center that includes the library was $6.7 million.

As of 2014, the library has a population served of 22,588 with 11,443 registered borrowers. There were four librarians out of nine total employees, and an annual budget of about $1.1 million. Within its collection are 36,545 print items, 3,969 audio items, and 5,999 video items, with a total collection size of 46,708. Total circulation (loans) that year was 367,240.

== See also ==
- List of libraries in Oregon
