= Hillsboro Public Library =

Library in Oregon, US

- 45°32′34.4″N 122°56′10.6″W
- Location: Hillsboro, Oregon
- Established: 1914
- Branches: 2

Collection
- Size: 329,000

Access and use
- Circulation: 2.85 million
- Population served: 137,000
- Members: 64,000

Other information
- Budget: $9.5 million
- Director: Tammy Wallin
- Employees: 140
- Website: Official website

The Hillsboro Public Library is a two-location public library system in Hillsboro, Oregon, United States. First opened in 1914 in a Carnegie library building, the system provides services to a population area of 137,000 people. As of 2015, the system had a usage of 922,000 visits per year, with circulation nearly 3 million items per year. One library is located near downtown in Shute Park, with the other location in the central portion of the city near the airport. The Hillsboro Public Library is part of Washington County Cooperative Library Services (WCCLS), which ensures library service is available to all residents of Washington County. In January, 2024, Tammy Wallin became the director.

== History ==
The first library in Hillsboro opened on December 9, 1914, when the Carnegie City Library was dedicated. This was one of 2,500 plus libraries built by money donated by Andrew Carnegie around the world, and the only public one in Washington County, Oregon (the Carnegie Library at Pacific University was a private, academic library). The land at Northeast Second and Lincoln Streets where the library was built was donated to the city. Designed by architect Ernest Kroner, the $10,000 building was constructed by the firm Book & Engeldinger.

In 1925, the library had a circulation 19,445 and a total of 4,855 volumes. Total fines charged that year were $92.28, while expenses totaled about $250 for the year to maintain the grounds, pay for heating, and pay for water and electricity. The Friends of the Library group was started on February 6, 1968. In May 1971, this group began campaigning for a new library building, including paying some of the early costs for designs, with voters later approving a bond measure to pay for the new facility. On January 21, 1975, a new library opened to replace the Carnegie building, located at Shute Park. The new building was designed by Martin, Soderstrom & Matteson. Circulation at the library totaled about 130,000 in 1975 with around 40,000 books. The year after the Shute Park location opened a library was opened in the Tanasbourne area on the east side of Hillsboro. In 1990, the city took over those operations, moving it in 1996 from the former Tanasbourne Mall location.

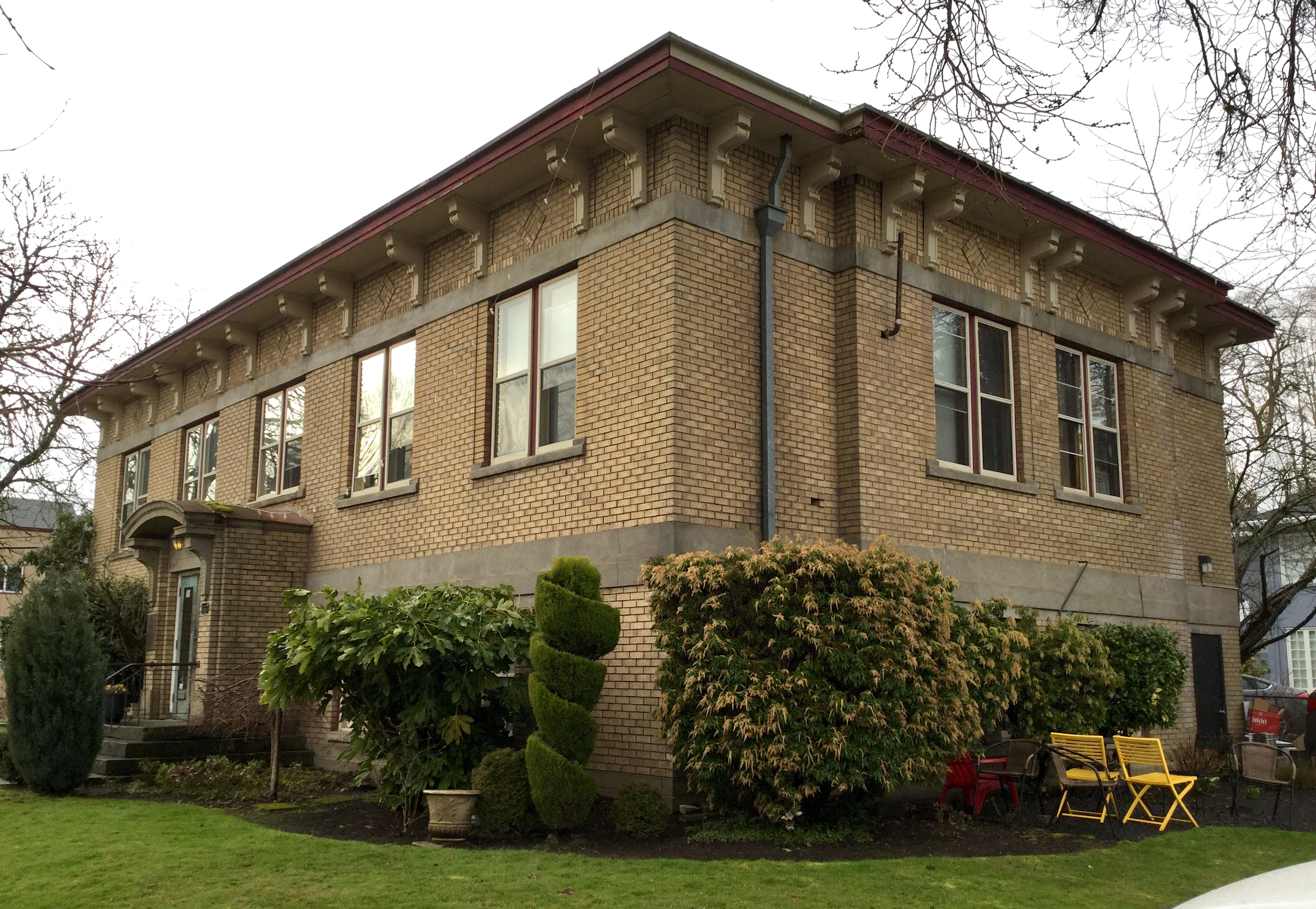
Old Carnegie building in 2023

In 1998, a Books-by-Rail branch was opened at the Hillsboro Central MAX Light Rail station in a 168-square-foot (15.6 m^{2}) space. Two times in 2002 and again in 2004, the city had property tax levies on the ballot to build a new $25 million library. Plans called for building a 60,000-square-foot (5,600 m^{2}) building on Cornell Road at 206th (now John Olsen Avenue) in the Tanasbourne area to replace the Tanasbourne branch. The levies to build the new library and remodel the Shute Park location failed. The first measure in 2002 received majority support at the voting booth, but lost due to low voter turnout and the state's double-majority law.

The library closed the Books by Rail branch in 2003 due to a reduced budget. Hillsboro cut their library funding by $350,000 that year. In 2005, the city decided on an alternate plan of buying an existing building and renovating it at a total cost of $13 million, with $1 million of the funds coming from private donations.

The city purchased a two-story, 77,000-square-foot (7,200 m^{2}) office building on Northeast Brookwood Parkway near the Hillsboro Airport for $6.8 million in September 2005. With the opening of the new location in a more central area of Hillsboro, the Tanasbourne location was closed with its inventory moved to the new library. The new library location opened in May 2007 after the building was renovated, but originally only occupied the first floor. In June 2013, the second floor opened to add 38,000 square feet (3,500 m^{2}) of space and an art gallery to the library. The Shute Park location was closed in 2013 for renovations, and re-opened in March 2014 with the entrance moved to the west end of the building. A 3D printer was added to the Shute Park branch in December 2014. The library added an automated kiosk, the Book-O-Mat, at the Hillsboro Civic Center in November 2015.

== Facilities and services ==
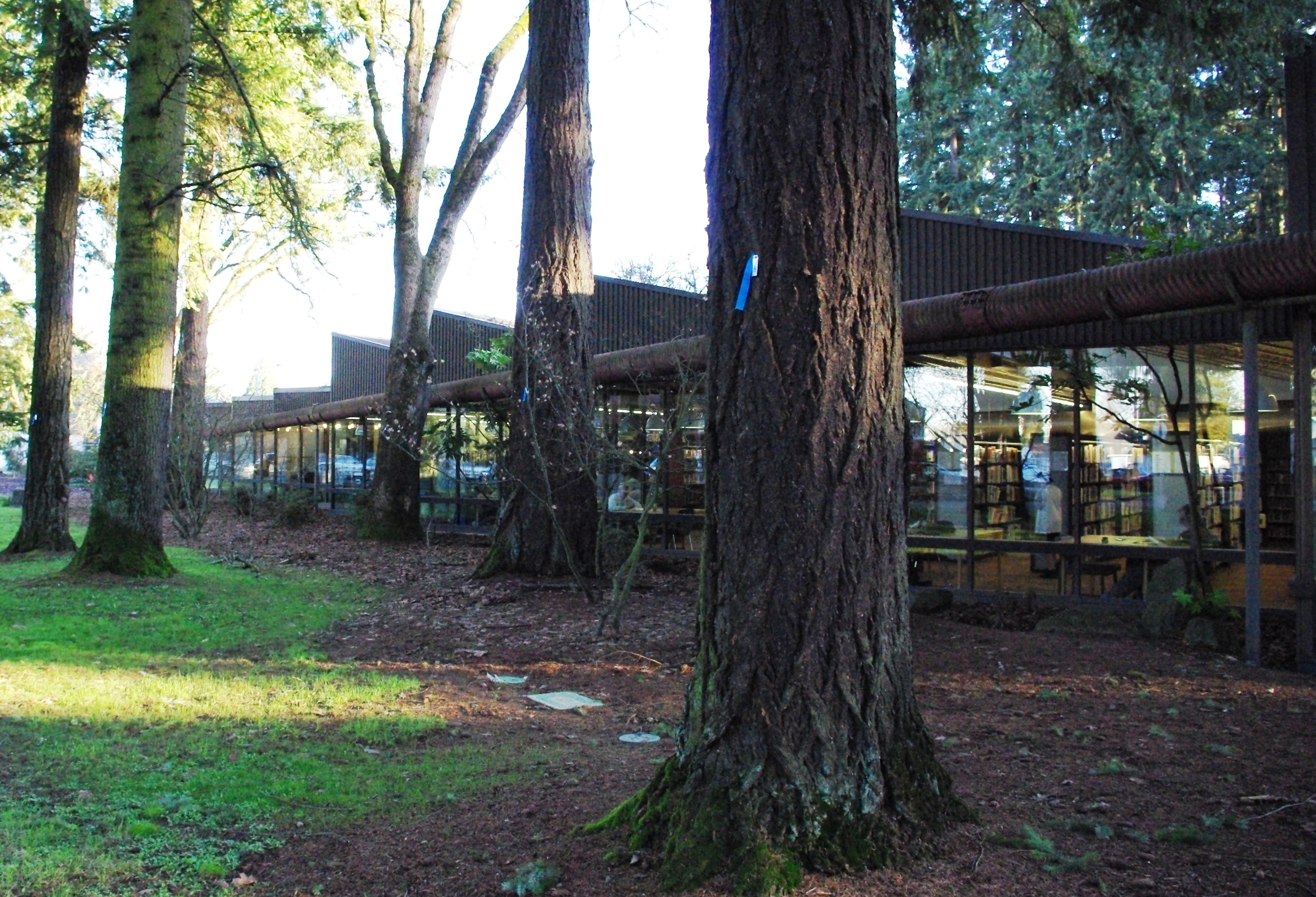
Shute Park Library

=== Brookwood Library ===
The Hillsboro Brookwood Library is housed in a two-story, city owned building encompassing 76,000 square feet (7,100 m^{2}). Formerly called the Main Library, the library's collection includes more than 300,000 items. Story readings at the Brookwood Library are given in a variety of languages including Mandarin, Japanese, Bengali, and Spanish. Part of the second floor houses an art gallery featuring local artists. This library includes a privately owned coffee shop with leased space in the building. There are approximately 300 parking spaces at the site. The Brookwood Library also houses the collection of the Hillsboro Independent and The Hillsboro Argus newspapers, dating back to 1887.

=== Shute Park Library ===
Opened in 1975, the Shute Park Library is the oldest of the two libraries in the system. The building was designed by Will Martin and cost $760,000 to build. With 15,000 square feet (1,400 m^{2}), it is also the smaller of the two locations. The building is triangular in shape, with the north facing wall all glass. Since being expanded in 2013–2014, Shute Park houses over 57,000 litems, ranging from books and videos to audio materials and periodicals. It contains 140 seats and 31 computer terminals.

=== Circulation ===
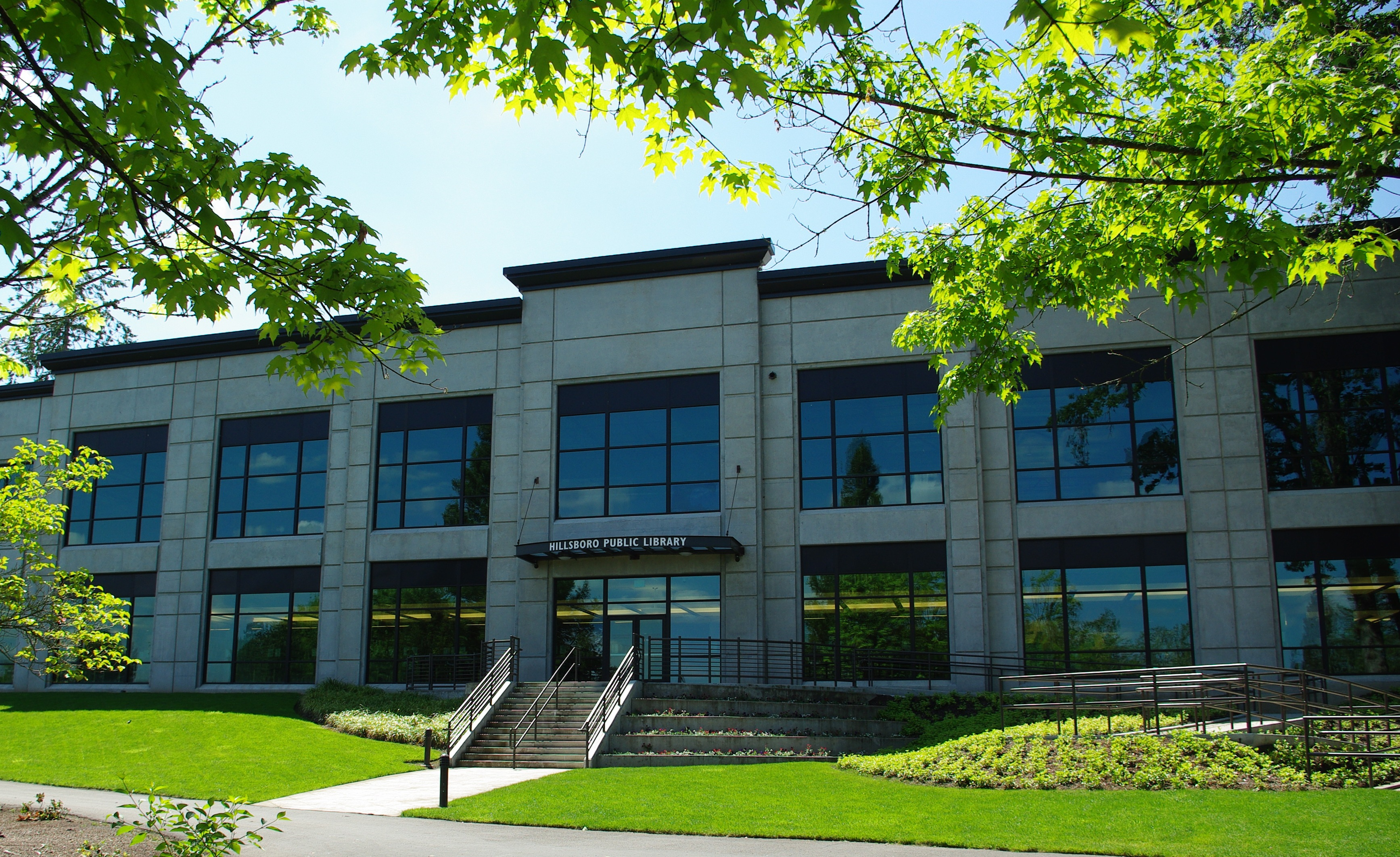
Brookwood Library

As of 2016, the library system had a service area population of approximately 140,000 residents.

For 2015 to 2016, combined the library has over 329,000 items in its collections and a circulation of over 2.85 million. Expenditures for the library total $9.5 million. Between the two branches there are 55 staff members including librarians. Hillsboro Public Library has 63,747 library card holders, and is part of Washington County Cooperative Library Services. Total visits were 921,000. The library is the third largest in Oregon by population served.
