= Aloha Community Library =

Library in Aloha, Oregon, U.S.

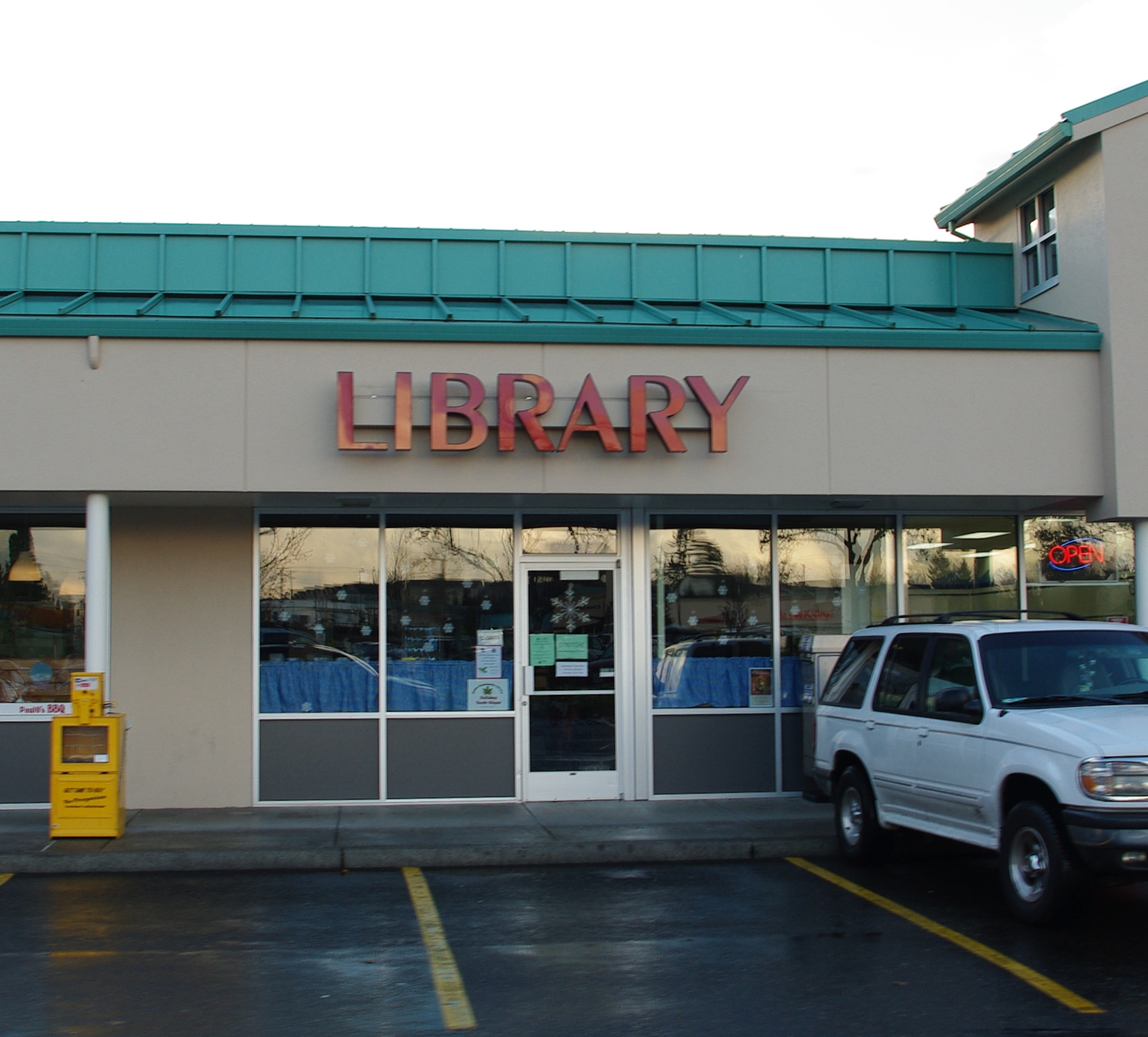
- The library in 2012
- 45.479721°N 122.859893°W
- Location: Aloha, Oregon
- Established: 2012; 14 years ago

Other information
- Website: alohalibrary.org

The Aloha Community Library is a library serving the community of Aloha, Oregon, United States. It is governed by the Aloha Community Library Association (ACLA), which is registered as a non-profit organization in the State of Oregon and a 501(c)(3). The library opened September 22, 2012.

== History ==
The library originated from an idea within a local quasi-governmental community group called Citizen Participation Organization 6 (CPO-6), which encompasses the unincorporated areas of Aloha, Reedville and Cooper Mountain, in Washington County.

Aloha community activist and political entrepreneur Eric Squires was primarily responsible for the initial planning for the library, forming a work group within CPO-6. Squires also serves as one of nine on the board of directors, with Doug Hoy as the president of that board. The library is a citizen-initiated effort in an unincorporated urban area of Washington County surrounded by the cities of Beaverton to the east, and Hillsboro to the west. Washington County Planning Commissioner Anthony R. Mills was also involved with planning for the creation of the library.

The library was opened in a 1,000-square-foot (93 m^{2}) space within a strip mall on Farmington Road at Kinnaman Road anchored by Bales Thriftway. At the time of its opening, it had about 4,500 books, and a total collection of 6,000 items. The opening was attended by Congresswoman Suzanne Bonamici, County Commission Chair Andy Duyck, and Commissioner Dick Schouten. The Aloha Community Library also provides internet access, printing, DVDs, and a device assisting the vision impaired with optical magnification.

In July 2013, the Washington County Commission approved $15,000 in county funds for preliminary design of a new library building. The library moved into a larger space in the same shopping center in April 2014, with the size increasing to 1,925 square feet (178.8 m^{2}).

In November 2015, Washington County voters approved a library levy that will bring the Aloha Library into the Washington County Cooperative Library Services in 2016. The library moved into a new larger location in January 2017.
