= Tualatin Public Library =

Library in Tualatin, Oregon, U.S.

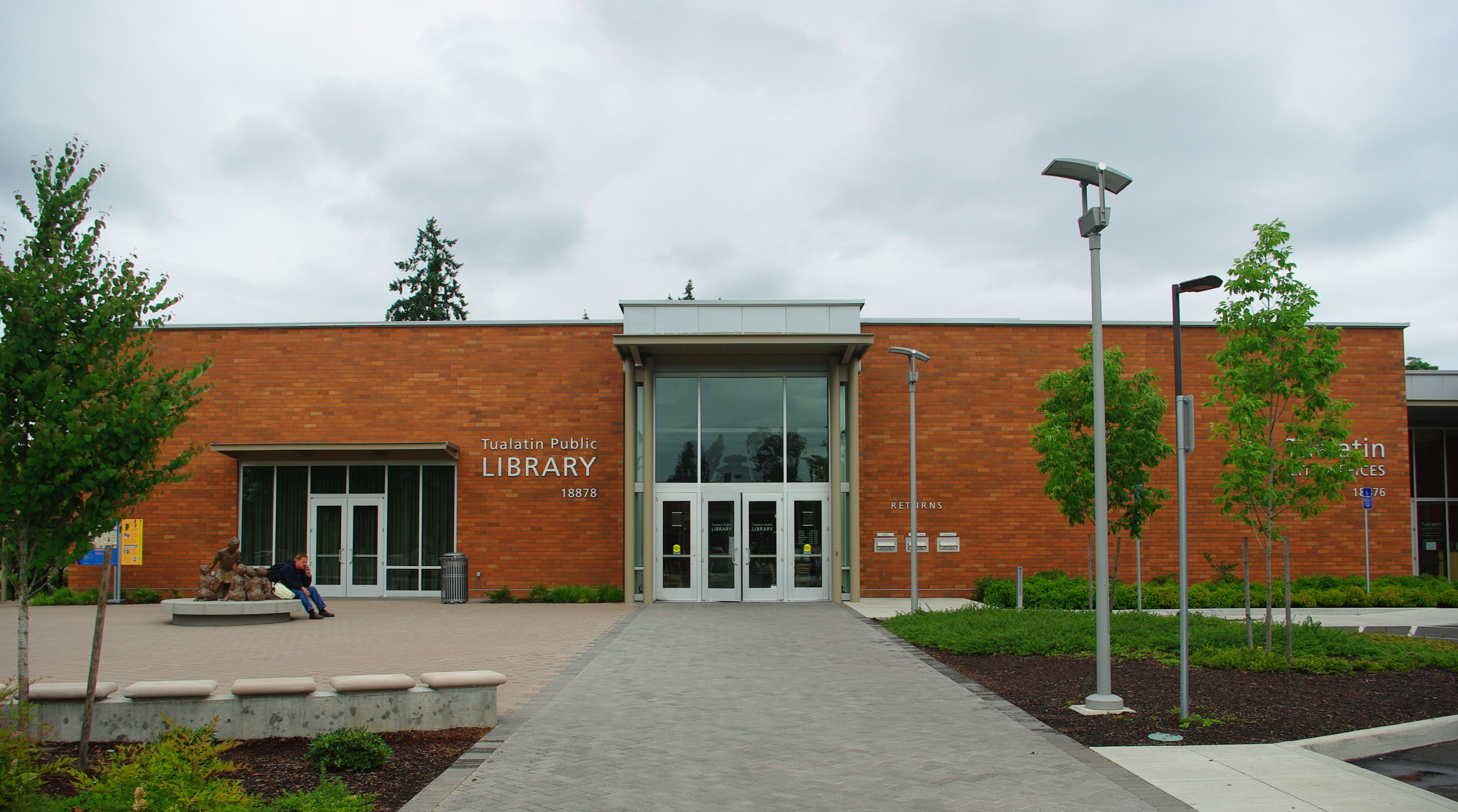
- Entrance to the library, 2009
- 45.38456°N 122.7586°W
- Location: Tualatin, Oregon

Other information
- Website: tualatinoregon.gov/library

Tualatin Public Library is the library within Washington County Cooperative Library Services serving Tualatin, Oregon. In 2012, The Oregonian reported that nearly 200 volunteers contribute more than 1,000 hours to the library each month.
