= Forest City Public Library =

- Formerly listed on the U.S. National Register of Historic Places
- Location within Iowa Location within the United States
- Location: 136 Clark St. Forest City, Iowa
- Coordinates: 43°15′46″N 93°38′17″W
- Area: less than one acre
- Built: 1899
- Built by: G.H. Lackore
- Architectural style: Romanesque Revival
- NRHP reference No.: 84001609

Significant dates
- Added to NRHP: April 5, 1984
- Removed from NRHP: March 7, 2016

The former Forest City Public Library was a historic building located in Forest City, Iowa, United States. It was one of two libraries in Iowa that were built with public money during the formative period of Iowa library development. The other was in Des Moines. The library here was built almost entirely with donations from the citizens of Forest City, with the rest coming from city funds. The Romanesque Revival structure was completed in 1899 and served Forest City as its library until 1927 when another facility was built. This building was then converted into commercial space. It was listed on the National Register of Historic Places in 1984. The building has subsequently been torn down, and it was removed from the National Register in 2016.
