= St. Johns Library =

Library in Portland, Oregon, United States

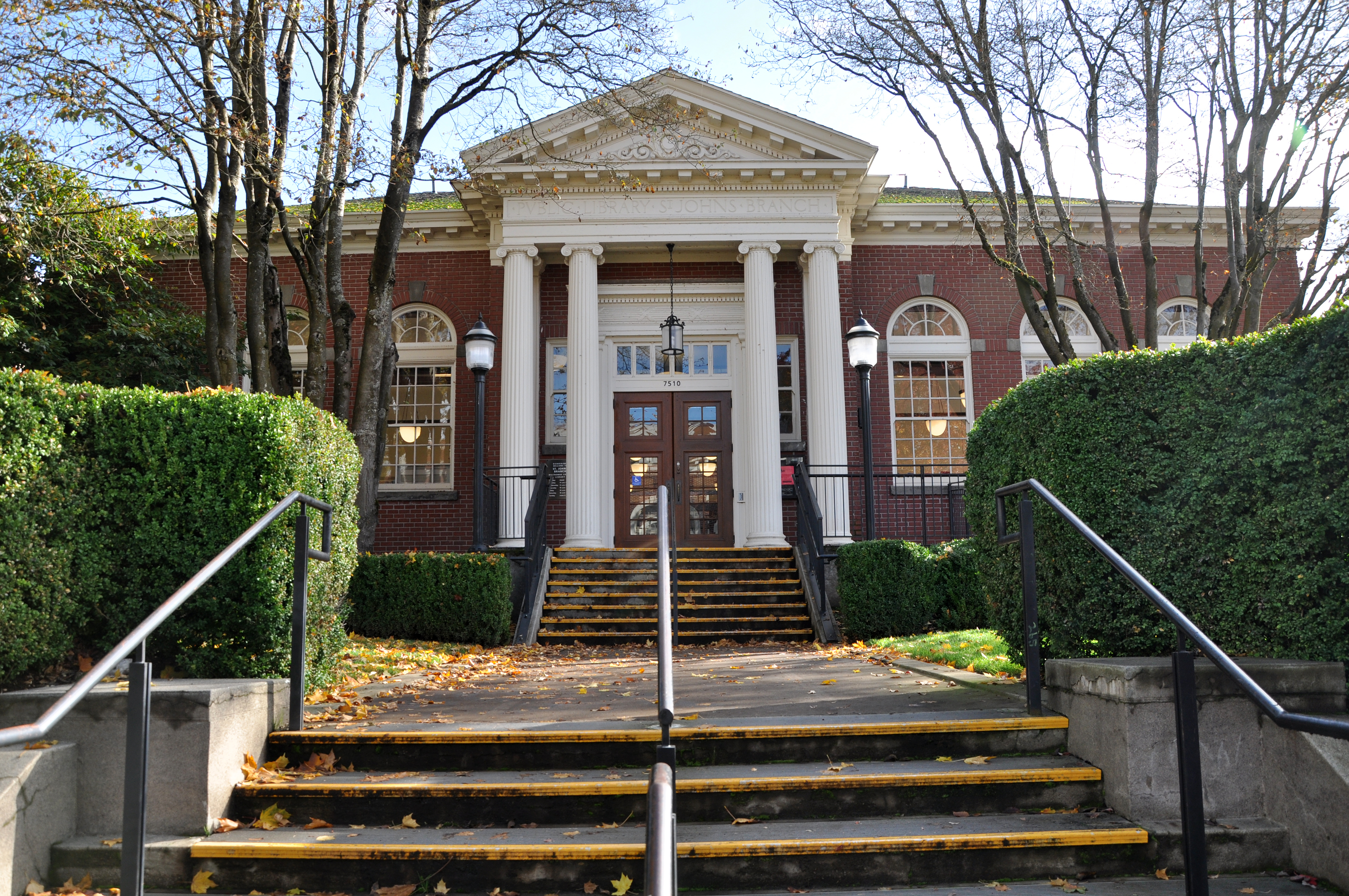
- Front entrance in 2012

- Location within Portland, Oregon

General information
- Architectural style: Georgian
- Location: St. Johns, 7510 N. Charleston Avenue, Portland, Oregon, United States
- Coordinates: 45°35′24″N 122°45′4″W
- Opened: November 22, 1913
- Renovated: February 13, 2001
- Owner: Multnomah County Library

Technical details
- Floor area: 6,381 square feet (592.8 m^{2})

Design and construction
- Architects: Folger Johnson and MacDonald Mayer

Renovating team
- Renovating firm: Thomas Hacker and Associates

Website
- St. Johns Library

The St. Johns Library is a branch of the Multnomah County Library, in St. Johns, Portland, Oregon. Operating at the same location since 1913, it underwent major renovation in 2000 to upgrade its infrastructure, expand its floor area, and increase its holding capacity to 25,000 volumes. The branch offers the Multnomah County Library catalog of two million books, periodicals and other materials.

== History ==
Early public library services in the St. Johns neighborhood began in 1903, when the Library Association of Portland established a small "deposit station" of books at a public school on the peninsula between the Columbia and Willamette rivers. In 1907, the St. Johns Reading Room and the Peninsular Reading Room, each with a collection of 200 to 300 books and a few reference works, offered public library services. These early ventures led to the opening of a St. Johns branch of Portland's central library on November 22, 1913.

The Georgian library, with a floor area of 5,527 square feet (513.5 m^{2}), adapted to changing demographics and economic conditions over the rest of the 20th century but remained at the same address. The building housed a baby clinic as well as a library from 1918 through the 1950s. During World War II, the Rations Board had an office in the building, and library patrons included a wide variety of newcomers who worked during the war in the nearby shipyards.

After Multnomah County voters passed a bond measure in 1996 to renovate branch libraries, St. Johns Library was among four branches qualifying for significant upgrades. It closed for renovation of its plumbing, wiring, and other systems in March 2000 and reopened on February 13, 2001. In the process, its floor area was expanded to 6,381 square feet (592.8 m^{2}), capable of holding 25,000 books. Self-checkout stations and security gates were installed in 2011. The library was temporarily closed in 2024 for expansion and interior renovations, funded by a 2020 building bond.
