= Banks Public Library =

Library in Banks, Oregon, U.S.

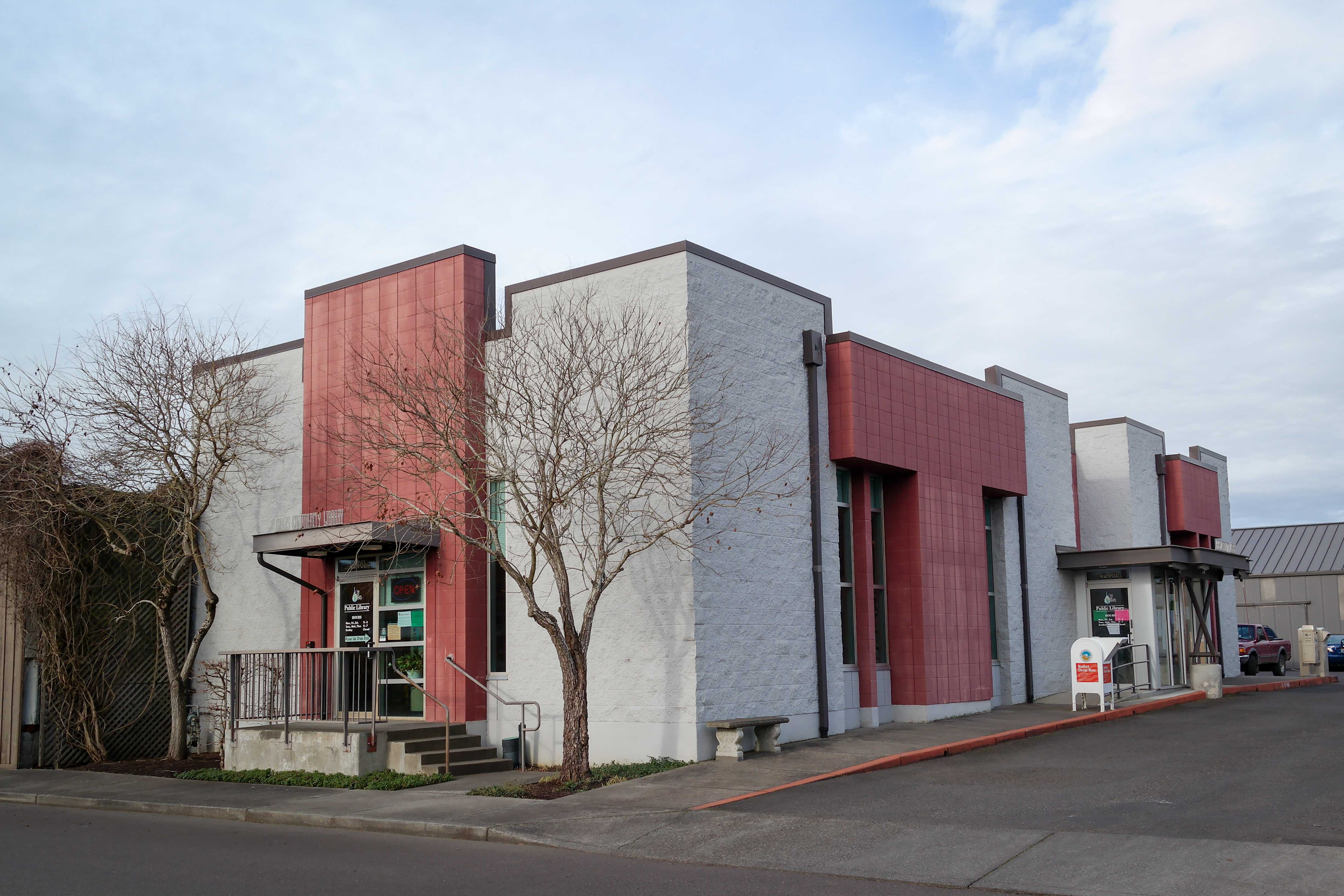
- 45.6198°N 123.1138°W
- Location: Banks, Oregon, United States
- Established: 1976
- Branch of: Washington County Cooperative Library Services

The Banks Public Library serves Banks, Oregon, and is part of the Washington County Cooperative Library Services.

== History ==
The library was established in 1976 by the Sunset Library Society, originally located in a bookmobile on city property. After sharing space in the Banks Junior High, it moved in 1988 to the Oak Village Shopping Center. In 1997, the library moved into a new facility, located on Market Street.
