= Cornelius Public Library =

Library in Cornelius, Oregon, U.S.

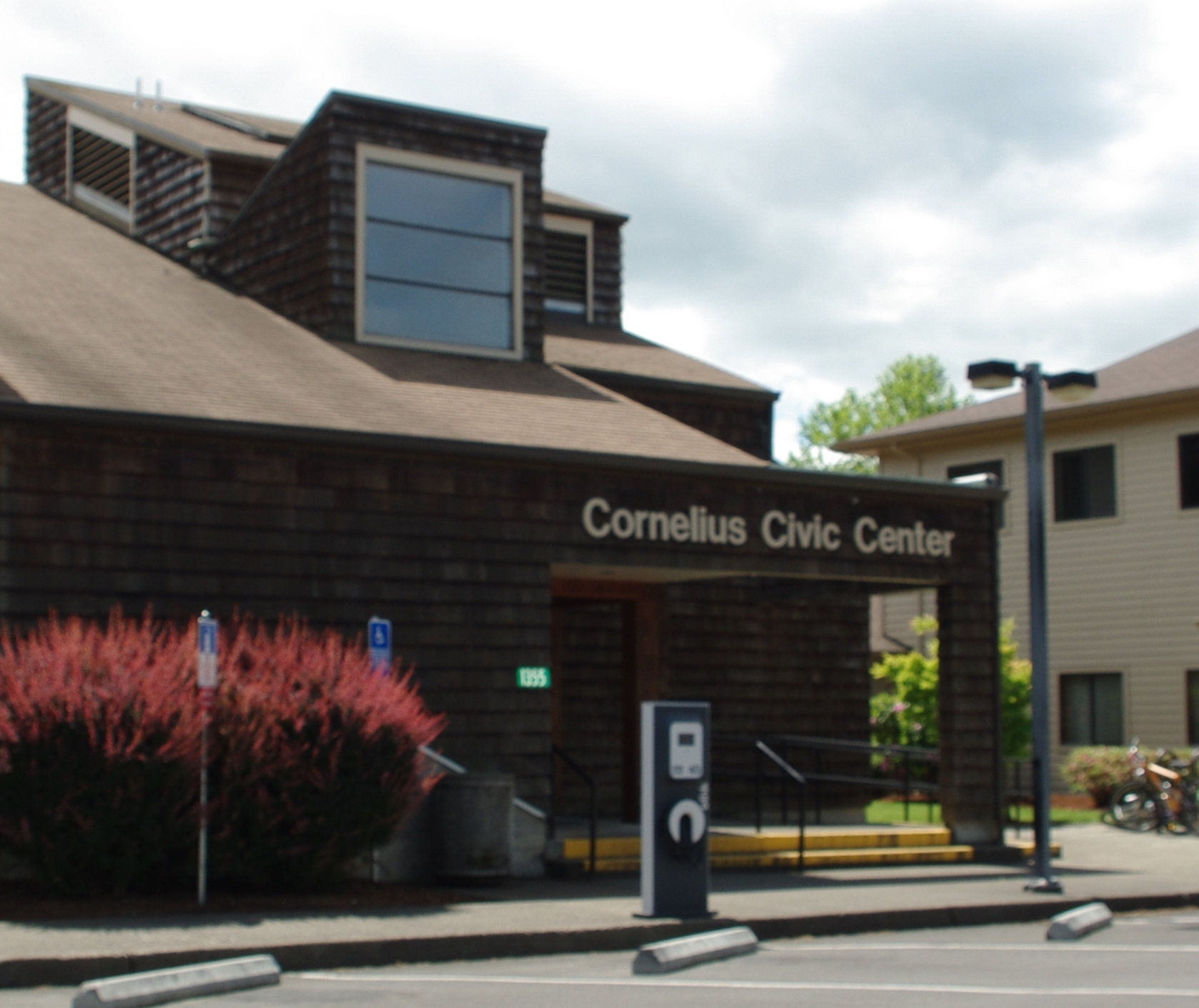
- The previous library building in 2013
- 45.52105468°N 123.05487212°W
- Location: Cornelius, Oregon
- Established: 1912

Collection
- Size: 18,807

Access and use
- Circulation: 46,265 (2012)
- Population served: 12,413 (2012)
- Members: 3,730 (2012)

Other information
- Budget: $322,794 (2012)
- Director: Karen Hill
- Employees: 4 (2012)
- Website: Official site

The Cornelius Public Library is the municipal library serving the city of Cornelius in the U.S. state of Oregon. Founded in 1912, the library is part of the Washington County Cooperative Library Services.

== History ==
Mrs. Wilkins registered the first library in Cornelius in 1912, which consisted of a single shelf at a local pool room. The Cornelius Women's Civic Club later leased a room at the fire station, and in 1914 the city began taxing residents to pay for the library. The tax rate was increased in 1916 in order to allow the library to expand. A Spanish language program was added in 1984, and the library also closed for a short time in the 1980s due to budget cuts.

In 2010, the library was awarded a $20,000 grant to help design a new building. The city then developed plans for a mix-use project combining a new library building with affordable housing for senior citizens. A bond measure to raise $2.4 million for the city's portion of the project was placed on the November 2013 ballot, but did not pass.

After plans for the new library were voted down, the state provided $2.4 million for the project in March 2014. Washington County provided grants totaling just over $1 million to the project in March 2015. Plans for the new library included space for chambers for the city council as well as for 3-D printer. The library introduced adventure packs that consist of themed backpacks with books and other supplies to encourage reading in 2015 after a grant from the Oregon International Airshow. In December 2015, the library received a $500,000 challenge grant from the National Endowment for the Humanities, which was followed by another $500,000 from the 2015-16 Oregon Legislature. The project received a donation of $70,000 from the Walters family in November 2017.
