= Beaverton City Library =

Library in Beaverton, Oregon, U.S.

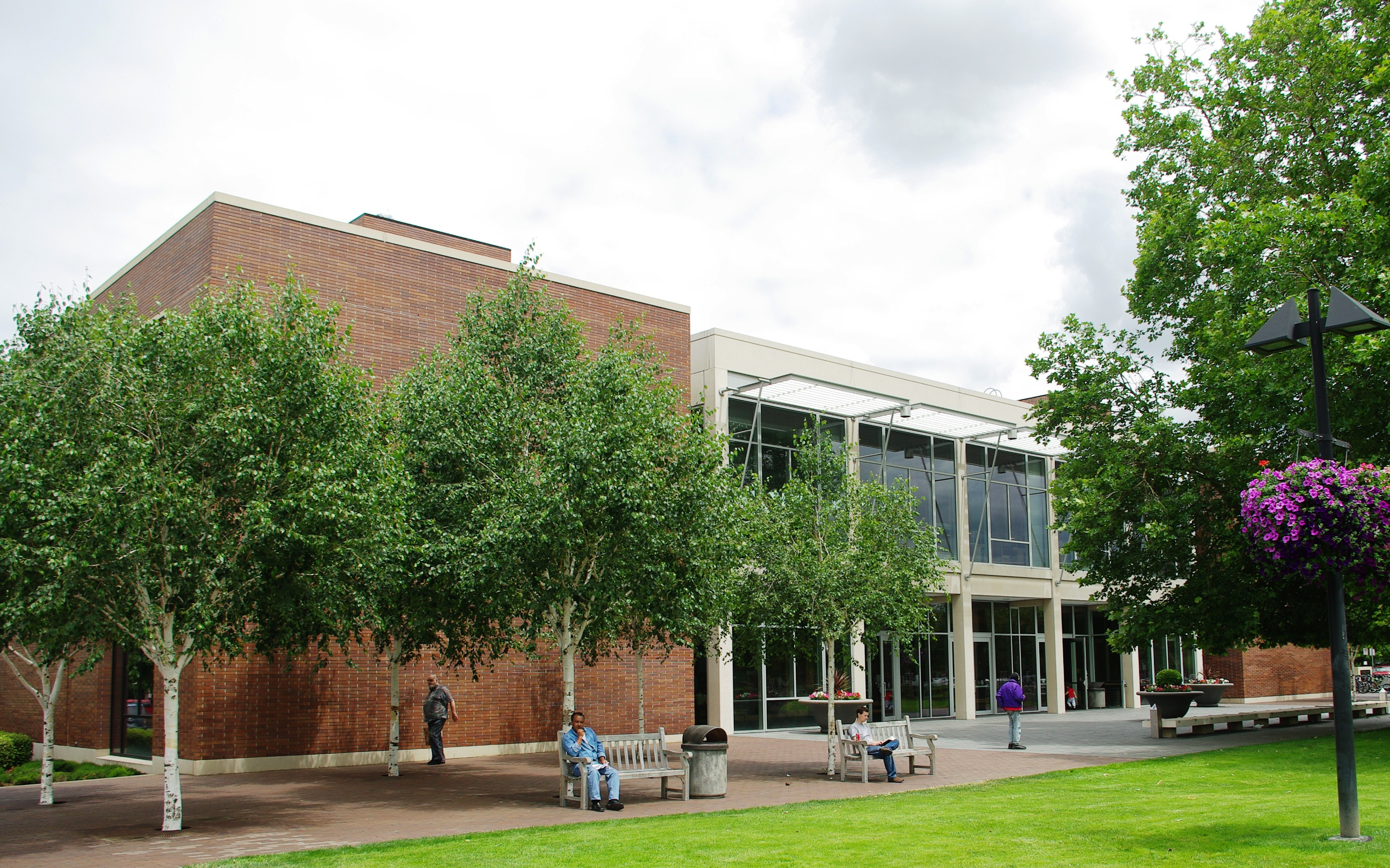
- Front of library in 2009
- 45.4841°N 122.8042°W
- Location: Beaverton, Oregon, United States
- Established: 1938; 88 years ago
- Branch of: Washington County Cooperative Library Services

The Beaverton City Library serves Beaverton, Oregon, and is part of the Washington County Cooperative Library Services.

== History ==
The library was established in 1938, encouraged by the Kiwanis Club. The city took over operations in 1940. In 1958, the library moved into its first new facility, located at 5th Street and Hall Boulevard. It moved to Hall Street Station in 1980, then to a former Albertson's grocery store at Allen and Hall Boulevards in 1984. The 1984 move increased the library's space from 9,400 square feet (870 m^{2}) to 23,000 square feet (2,100 m^{2}). In 1985, it was the largest library in Washington County.

In 1998, voters approved the construction of a new facility at Fifth Avenue and Hall Boulevard. The library moved into its new space in September 2000. The building measures 69,000 square feet and contains over 350,000 items.

The library further expanded in June 2010 when it opened a 12,000 square foot branch library in the Murray Scholls Town Center. A new children's section at the branch library was unveiled in 2015.

== Services ==
The Beaverton City Library is the third busiest library in Oregon as measured by collection use. The facilities are visited by around 67,000 people per month, with a monthly circulation of 350,000 items, or 2.75 million annually. Programs for people of all ages are offered on a monthly basis and the library's meeting rooms are available to members of the public to book through the City of Beaverton's Web site. The library offers access to traditional print resources and physical media as well as electronic books and databases through the Washington County Cooperative Library Services. Other services include a library of things, interlibrary loan, public computers, volunteer and internship opportunities, and cultural passes for free admission to various destinations. A new public makerspace known as "DAM" (Design and Make) opened in 2020.
