= Banks, Oregon =

- City
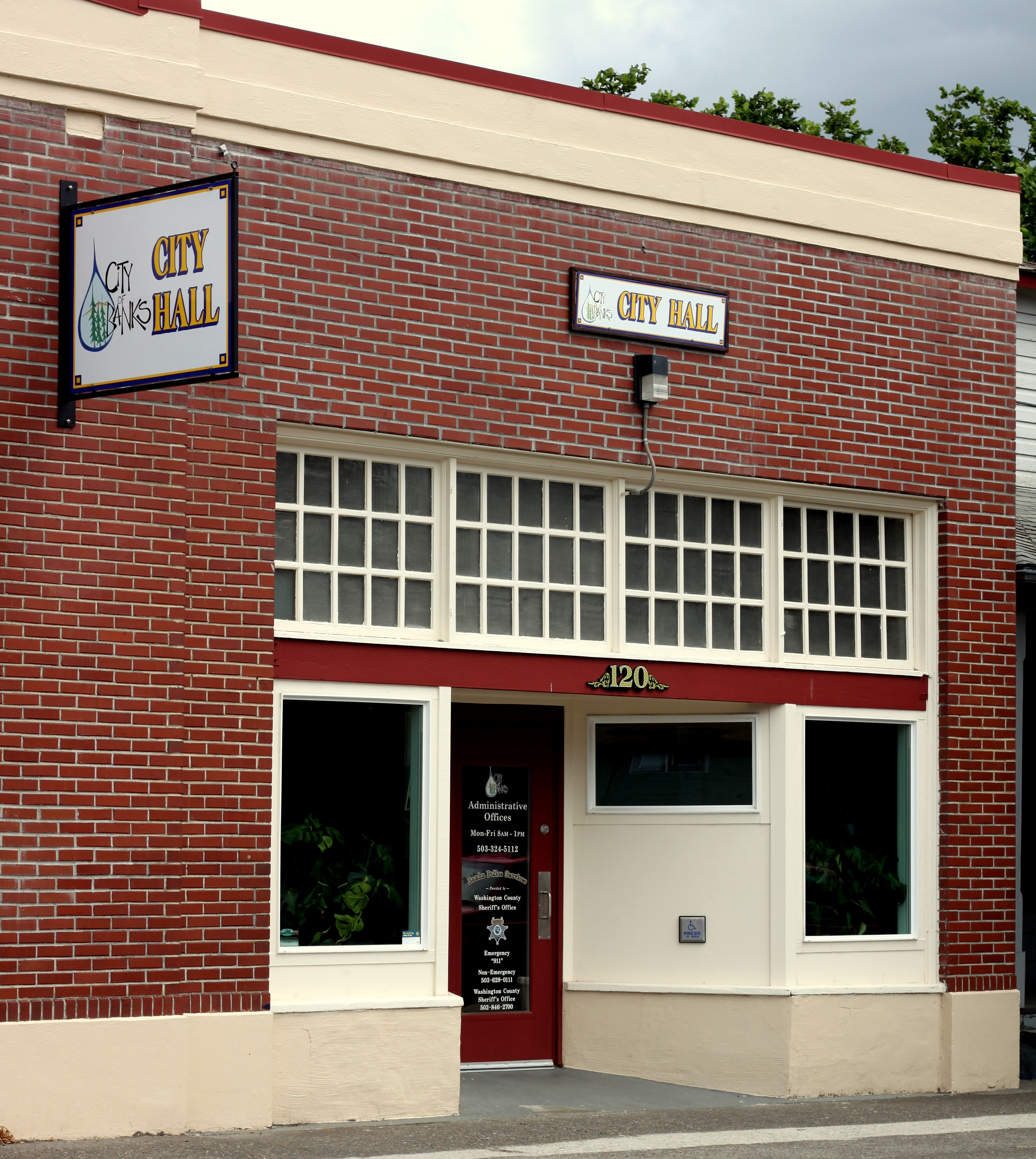
- City Hall in Banks

- Location in Oregon

- Location in the United States
- Coordinates: 45°36′54″N 123°06′25″W
- Country: United States
- State: Oregon
- County: Washington
- Incorporated: January 16, 1906

Government
  - Mayor: Marsha Kirk

Area
  - Total: 0.76 sq mi (1.97 km^{2})
  - Land: 0.76 sq mi (1.97 km^{2})
  - Water: 0 sq mi (0.00 km^{2})
- Elevation: 213 ft (65 m)

Population (2020)
  - Total: 1,837
  - Density: 2,412.1/sq mi (931.32/km^{2})
- Time zone: UTC-8 (Pacific)
  - Summer (DST): UTC-7 (Pacific)
- ZIP codes: 97106, 97109, 97125
- Area code: 503
- FIPS code: 41-03850
- GNIS feature ID: 2409784
- Website: www.cityofbanks.org

Banks is a city in Washington County, Oregon, United States, which is located in the Tualatin Valley. It is the southern anchor to the Banks–Vernonia State Trail, which is a 21-mile-long (34 km) linear trail popular with bicyclists, hikers, and equestrians. The population was 1,837 at the 2020 census. The community was named for John and Nancy Banks, who owned a nearby dairy farm. Incorporated in 1921, it is located in the western part of the county where Oregon Route 6 intersects Oregon Route 47.

== Geography ==
According to the United States Census Bureau, the city has a total area of 0.37 square miles (0.96 km^{2}), all land.

== Demographics ==
Historical population
Census	Pop.	Note	%±
1930	209		—
1940	247		18.2%
1950	376		52.2%
1960	347		−7.7%
1970	430		23.9%
1980	489		13.7%
1990	563		15.1%
2000	1,286		128.4%
2010	1,777		38.2%
2020	1,837		3.4%
U.S. Decennial Census

=== 2020 census ===
As of the 2020 census, Banks had a population of 1,837. The median age was 32.0 years. 30.6% of residents were under the age of 18 and 6.6% of residents were 65 years of age or older. For every 100 females there were 98.4 males, and for every 100 females age 18 and over there were 97.4 males age 18 and over.

0% of residents lived in urban areas, while 100.0% lived in rural areas.

There were 593 households in Banks, of which 52.3% had children under the age of 18 living in them. Of all households, 57.5% were married-couple households, 16.0% were households with a male householder and no spouse or partner present, and 18.2% were households with a female householder and no spouse or partner present. About 14.9% of all households were made up of individuals and 6.2% had someone living alone who was 65 years of age or older.

There were 617 housing units, of which 3.9% were vacant. Among occupied housing units, 75.9% were owner-occupied and 24.1% were renter-occupied. The homeowner vacancy rate was 1.3% and the rental vacancy rate was 4.0%.

Racial composition as of the 2020 census
Race	Number	Percent
White	1,495	81.4%
Black or African American	4	0.2%
American Indian and Alaska Native	10	0.5%
Asian	29	1.6%
Native Hawaiian and Other Pacific Islander	9	0.5%
Some other race	73	4.0%
Two or more races	217	11.8%
Hispanic or Latino (of any race)	221	12.0%

=== 2010 census ===
As of the census of 2010, there were 1,777 people, 553 households, and 445 families living in the city. The population density was 4,802.7 inhabitants per square mile (1,854.3/km^{2}). There were 580 housing units at an average density of 1,567.6 per square mile (605.3/km^{2}). The racial makeup of the city was 92.5% White, 0.3% African American, 0.6% Native American, 1.2% Asian, 0.3% Pacific Islander, 1.4% from other races, and 3.8% from two or more races. Hispanic or Latino of any race were 7.0% of the population.

There were 553 households, of which 57.1% had children under the age of 18 living with them, 59.5% were married couples living together, 13.4% had a female householder with no husband present, 7.6% had a male householder with no wife present, and 19.5% were non-families. 14.3% of all households were made up of individuals, and 2.5% had someone living alone who was 65 years of age or older. The average household size was 3.21 and the average family size was 3.54.

The median age in the city was 29.5 years. 37.8% of residents were under the age of 18; 7.4% were between the ages of 18 and 24; 31.7% were from 25 to 44; 19.2% were from 45 to 64; and 3.9% were 65 years of age or older. The gender makeup of the city was 50.6% male and 49.4% female.

=== 2000 census ===
As of the census of 2000, there were 1,286 people, 440 households, and 337 families living in the city. The population density was 3,885.7 inhabitants per square mile (1,500.3/km^{2}). There were 492 housing units at an average density of 1,486.6 per square mile (574.0/km^{2}). The racial makeup of the city was 91.14% White, 0.39% African American, 0.31% Native American, 1.79% Asian, 0.47% Pacific Islander, 2.80% from other races, and 3.11% from two or more races. Hispanic or Latino of any race were 3.81% of the population.

There were 440 households, out of which 50.7% had children under the age of 18 living with them, 64.1% were married couples living together, 8.6% had a female householder with no husband present, and 23.4% were non-families. 17.7% of all households were made up of individuals, and 3.2% had someone living alone who was 65 years of age or older. The average household size was 2.92 and the average family size was 3.31.

In the city, the population was spread out, with 35.8% under the age of 18, 7.8% from 18 to 24, 39.9% from 25 to 44, 12.5% from 45 to 64, and 4.0% who were 65 years of age or older. The median age was 29 years. For every 100 females, there were 97.5 males. For every 100 females age 18 and over, there were 93.4 males.

The median income for a household in the city was $57,500, and the median income for a family was $61,932. Males had a median income of $42,330 versus $26,818 for females. The per capita income for the city was $21,354. About 3.1% of families and 3.2% of the population were below the poverty line, including 2.1% of those under age 18 and 4.6% of those age 65 or over.

== Schools ==
The city has three public schools, which are administered by the Banks School District. The city schools are Banks Elementary School, Banks Junior High School, and Banks High School.

== Attractions ==
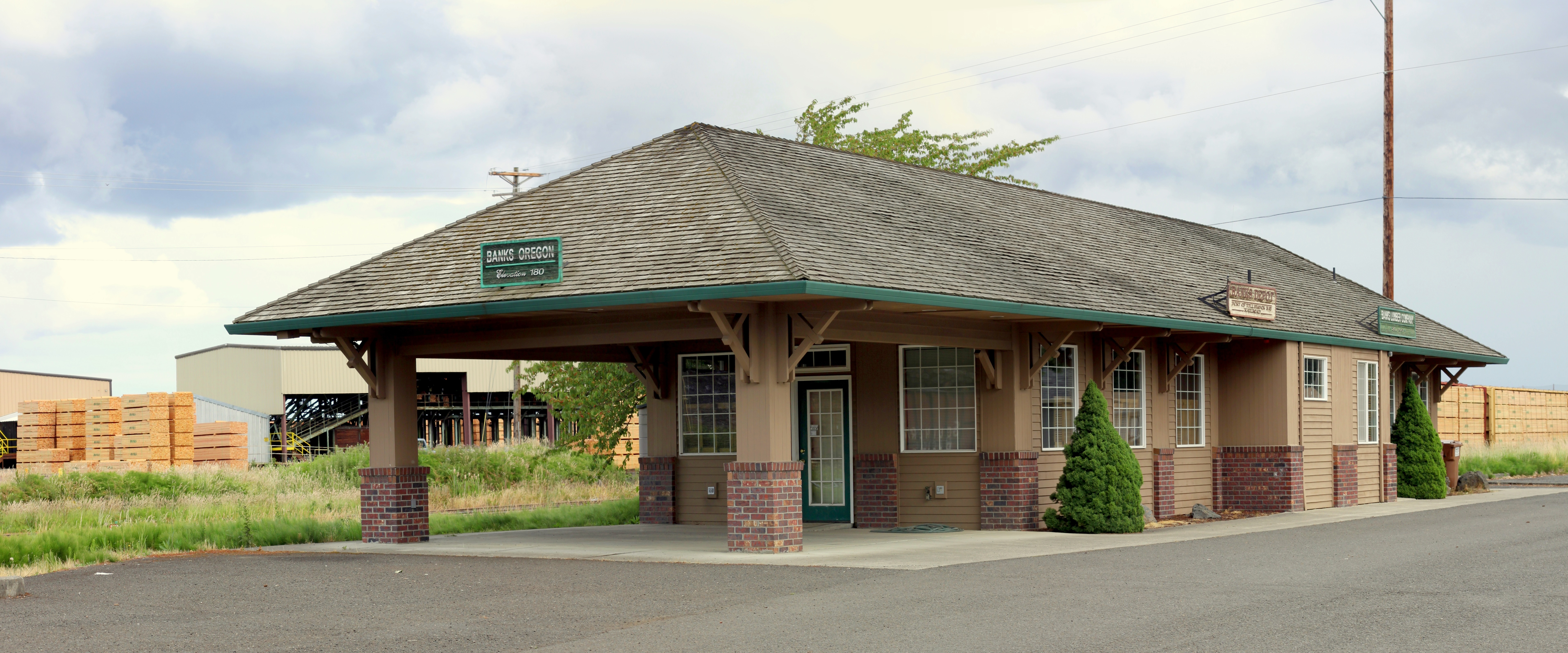
Railway depot in Banks

- Banks-Vernonia State Trail

== See also ==
- Banks Public Library
- Sunset Speedway
