= Cornelius, Oregon =

- City
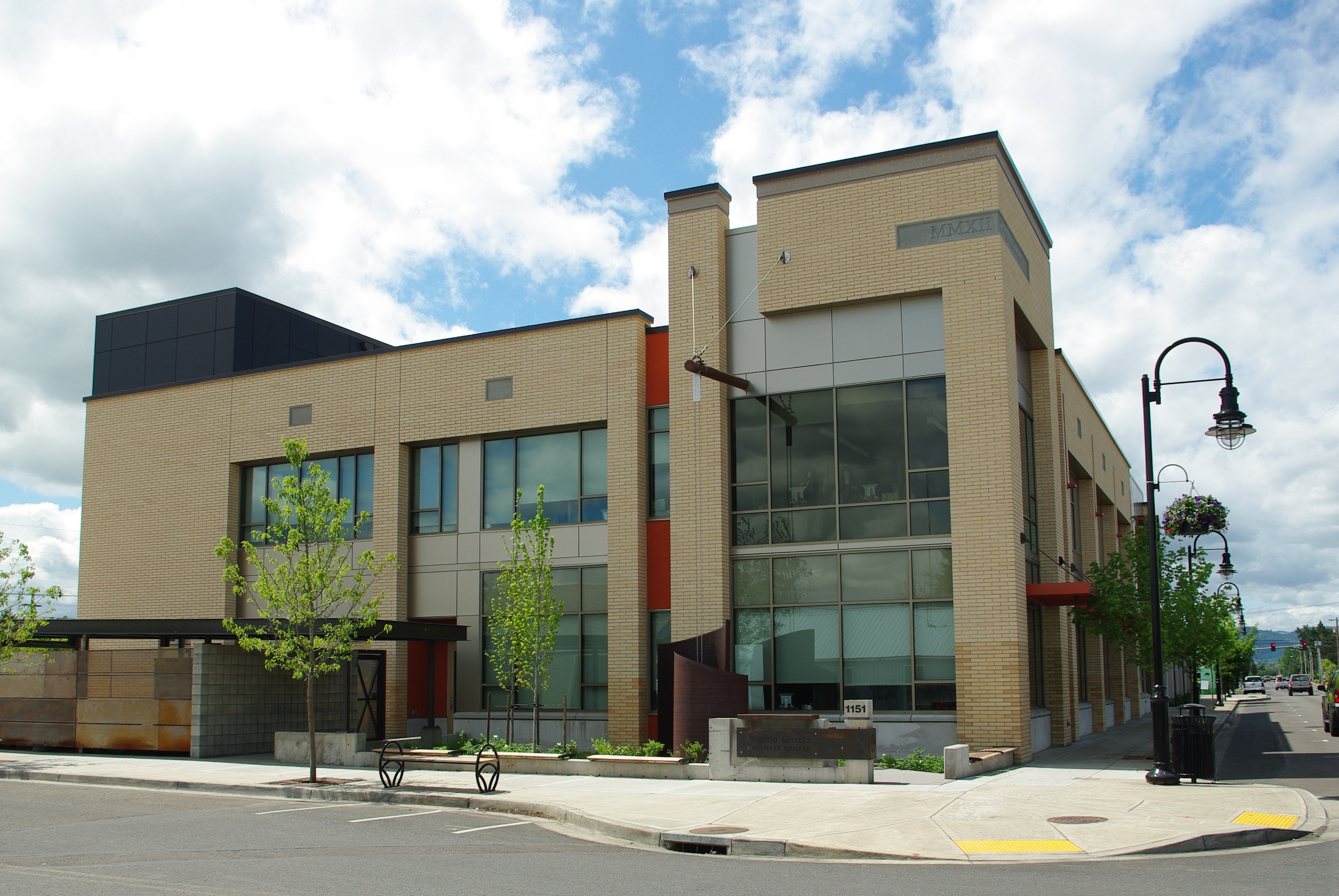
- Virginia Garcia Memorial Health Center
- Nicknames: Oregon's Family Town
- Interactive map of Cornelius, Oregon
- Location within Oregon Location within the United States
- Coordinates: 45.518929°N 123.050953°W
- Country: United States
- State: Oregon
- County: Washington
- Incorporated: April 1893
- Founder: Thomas R. Cornelius

Government
  - Type: Mayor–Council
  - Mayor: Jeffrey C. Dalin
  - Council President: Angeles Godinez Valencia
  - Councilors: Edén López; Gregory Vaughn; Citlalli Nuñez-Barragán

Area
  - Total: 2.341 sq mi (6.062 km^{2})
  - Land: 2.341 sq mi (6.062 km^{2})
  - Water: 0 sq mi (0.000 km^{2}) 0.0%
- Elevation: 180 ft (55 m)

Population (2020)
  - Total: 12,694
  - Estimate (2025): 15,520
  - Density: 5,424/sq mi (2,094/km^{2})
- Time zone: UTC−8 (Pacific (PST))
  - Summer (DST): UTC−7 (PDT)
- ZIP Code: 97113
- Area codes: 503 and 971
- FIPS code: 41-15550
- GNIS feature ID: 2410230
- Website: corneliusor.gov

Cornelius is a city in Washington County, Oregon, United States. Located in the Portland metropolitan area. The population was 12,694 at the 2020 census, and was estimated at 15,520 in 2025. The city lies along Tualatin Valley Highway between Forest Grove to the west and Hillsboro to the east. Cornelius was incorporated in April 1893 and is named for founder Thomas R. Cornelius.

== History ==
In 1845, Benjamin Cornelius immigrated to Oregon with his family, traveling with Joseph Meek. The Cornelius family settled on the Tualatin Plains, near what is now North Plains. The same year, Benjamin Q. Tucker and Solomon Emerick staked land claims and established farms on the land that would eventually become Cornelius. At that time, the area was called Free Orchards; there was no actual community, but the name referred to the orchards on the 107 acres (0.43 km^{2}) of land.

In 1871, Benjamin Cornelius's son Colonel Thomas R. Cornelius learned that Ben Holladay planned to extend the Oregon and California Railroad right through Free Orchards. Holladay had been told by Forest Grove and Hillsboro that they would not allow the railroad free right-of-way, so Holladay planned to bypass them, and build Free Orchards into a new city that would become the new county seat of Washington County.

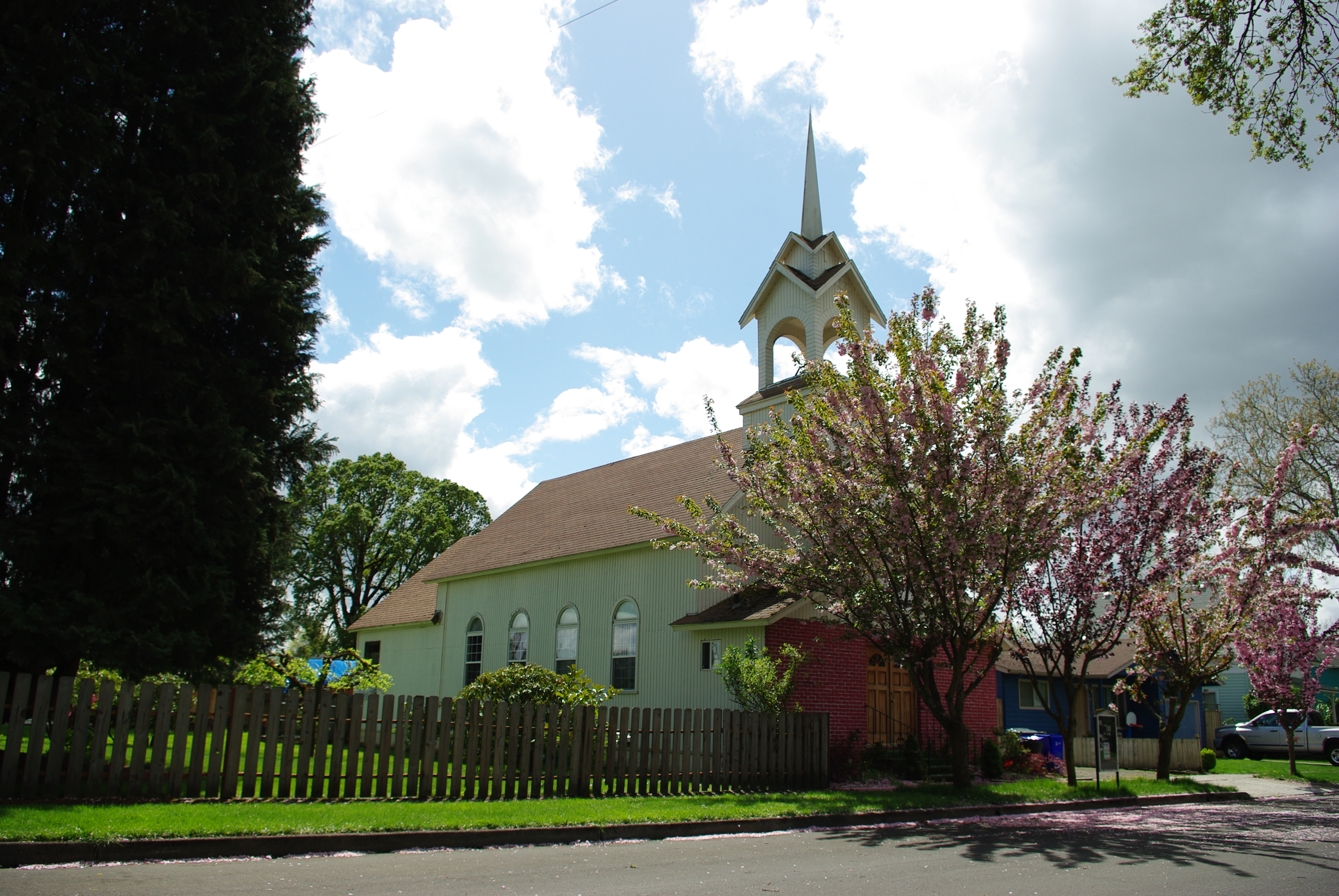
Church in the city on South Beech Street

The new railroad was approaching Free Orchards in 1871, and Cornelius saw an opportunity to benefit from the new railroad. He left his farm and built a new house, a warehouse, and a store in Free Orchards. The warehouse and store were located right next to the railroad, and so became natural places for local farmers to trade and store their goods. Cornelius also built a creamery to process milk, and two sawmills to supply lumber for the growing community. In addition, he helped to build the first frame schoolhouse and the Methodist Church.

In 1893, Free Orchards was incorporated and renamed "Cornelius", to honor the man who spent many years helping build the community. Though Holladay's plan to make Free Orchards into the county seat never materialized, Cornelius survives today as an agricultural town and, increasingly, as a suburb of Portland. The Cornelius Public Library was founded in 1912.

== Geography ==
According to the United States Census Bureau, the city has a total area of 2.340 square miles (6.06 km^{2}), all land.

== Demographics ==
Historical population
Census	Pop.	Note	%±
1900	246		—
1910	459		86.6%
1920	282		−38.6%
1930	265		−6.0%
1940	637		140.4%
1950	998		56.7%
1960	1,146		14.8%
1970	1,903		66.1%
1980	4,462		134.5%
1990	6,148		37.8%
2000	9,652		57.0%
2010	11,869		23.0%
2020	12,694		7.0%
2025 (est.)	15,520		22.3%
U.S. Decennial Census; 2020 Census

According to realtor website Zillow, the average price of a home as of December 31, 2025, in Cornelius is $475,860.

As of the 2024 American Community Survey, there are 4,843 estimated households in Cornelius with an average of 2.91 persons per household. The city has a median household income of $96,273. Approximately 9.1% of the city's population lives at or below the poverty line. Cornelius has an estimated 67.3% employment rate, with 18.9% of the population holding a bachelor's degree or higher and 77.1% holding a high school diploma. There were 4,949 housing units at an average density of 2,114.96 per square mile (816.6/km^{2}).

The top five reported languages (people were allowed to report up to two languages, thus the figures will generally add to more than 100%) were English (52.3%), Spanish (44.2%), Indo-European (1.7%), Asian and Pacific Islander (1.1%), and Other (0.7%).

The median age in the city was 35.1 years.

Cornelius, Oregon – racial and ethnic composition Note: the US Census treats Hispanic/Latino as an ethnic category. This table excludes Latinos from the racial categories and assigns them to a separate category. Hispanics/Latinos may be of any race.
Race / ethnicity (NH = non-Hispanic)	Pop. 1980	Pop. 1990	Pop. 2000	Pop. 2010	Pop. 2020	% 1980	% 1990	% 2000	% 2010	% 2020
White alone (NH)	4,007	5,020	5,617	5,267	4,744	89.80%	81.65%	58.20%	44.38%	37.37%
Black or African American alone (NH)	13	18	64	80	119	0.29%	0.29%	0.66%	0.67%	0.94%
Native American or Alaska Native alone (NH)	39	55	82	71	71	0.87%	0.89%	0.85%	0.60%	0.56%
Asian alone (NH)	24	89	92	256	238	0.54%	1.45%	0.95%	2.16%	1.87%
Pacific Islander alone (NH)	—	—	23	9	47	—	—	0.24%	0.08%	0.37%
Other race alone (NH)	8	6	6	7	47	0.18%	0.10%	0.06%	0.06%	0.37%
Mixed race or multiracial (NH)	—	—	159	231	435	—	—	1.65%	1.95%	3.43%
Hispanic or Latino (any race)	371	960	3,609	5,948	6,993	8.31%	15.61%	37.39%	50.11%	55.09%
Total	4,462	6,148	9,652	11,869	12,694	100.00%	100.00%	100.00%	100.00%	100.00%

=== 2020 census ===
As of the 2020 census, there were 12,694 people, 3,633 households, and 2,910 families residing in the city. The population density was 5,427.11 inhabitants per square mile (2,095.4/km^{2}). There were 3,684 housing units at an average density of 1,575.03 per square mile (608.1/km^{2}). The racial makeup of the city was 45.3% White, 1.1% African American, 2.7% Native American, 2.2% Asian, 0.4% Pacific Islander, 28.8% from some other races and 19.3% from two or more races. Hispanic or Latino people of any race were 55.09% of the population.

The median age was 33.5 years; 28.2% of residents were under the age of 18 and 10.3% were 65 years of age or older. For every 100 females there were 106.2 males, and for every 100 females age 18 and over there were 102.6 males age 18 and over.

99.7% of residents lived in urban areas, while 0.3% lived in rural areas.

There were 3,633 households in Cornelius, of which 46.8% had children under the age of 18 living in them. Of all households, 56.9% were married-couple households, 14.6% were households with a male householder and no spouse or partner present, and 19.9% were households with a female householder and no spouse or partner present. About 13.4% of all households were made up of individuals and 6.9% had someone living alone who was 65 years of age or older.

There were 3,684 housing units, of which 1.4% were vacant. Among occupied housing units, 72.4% were owner-occupied and 27.6% were renter-occupied. The homeowner vacancy rate was 0.5% and the rental vacancy rate was 1.9%.

=== 2010 census ===
As of the 2010 census, there were 11,869 people, 3,339 households, and 2,666 families living in the city. The population density was 5,905.0 inhabitants per square mile (2,279.9/km^{2}). There were 3,499 housing units at an average density of 1,740.8 per square mile (672.1/km^{2}). The racial makeup of the city was 64.0% White, 1.2% African American, 1.3% Native American, 2.2% Asian, 0.1% Pacific Islander, 27.2% from some other races, and 4.0% from two or more ethnicities. Hispanic or Latino people of any race were 50.11% of the population.

There were 3,339 households, of which 51.8% had children under the age of 18 living with them, 62.1% were married couples living together, 10.5% had a female householder with no husband present, 7.3% had a male householder with no wife present, and 20.2% were non-families. 14.1% of all households were made up of individuals, and 5.1% had someone living alone who was 65 years of age or older. The average household size was 3.51 and the average family size was 3.88.

The median age in the city was 30.4 years. 32.9% of residents were under the age of 18; 9.8% were between the ages of 18 and 24; 30.6% were from 25 to 44; 20.5% were from 45 to 64; and 6.3% were 65 years of age or older. The gender makeup of the city was 51.1% male and 48.9% female.

=== 2000 census ===
As of the 2000 census, there were 9,652 people, 2,880 households, and 2,246 families residing in the city. The population density was 5,095.9 inhabitants per square mile (1,967.5/km^{2}). There were 3,003 housing units at an average density of 1,585.5 per square mile (612.2/km^{2}). The racial makeup of the city was 37.39% White, 0.76% African American, 1.24% Native American, 1.04% Asian, 0.28% Pacific Islander, 24.32% from some other races, and 3.76% from two or more races. Hispanic or Latino people of any race were 68.61% of the population.

There were 2,880 households, out of which 45.3% had children under the age of 18 living with them, 61.8% were married couples living together, 10.4% had a female householder with no husband present, and 22.0% were non-families. 15.9% of all households were made up of individuals, and 5.4% had someone living alone who was 65 years of age or older. The average household size was 3.31 and the average family size was 3.64.

In the city, the population was spread out, with 32.5% under the age of 18, 11.0% from 18 to 24, 33.6% from 25 to 44, 16.9% from 45 to 64, and 6.1% who were 65 years of age or older. The median age was 29 years. For every 100 females, there were 108.1 males. For every 100 females age 18 and over, there were 107.0 males.

The median income for a household in the city was $45,959, and the median income for a family was $49,456. Males had a median income of $32,164 versus $25,207 for females. The per capita income for the city was $15,290. About 10.8% of families and 16.1% of the population were below the poverty line, including 17.6% of those under age 18 and 10.5% of those age 65 or over.

== Government ==
Police services are contracted through the Washington County Sheriff's Office.

== Politics ==
Presidential election results
Year	DEM	GOP	Others
2020	58.9% 2,982	37.7% 1,909	3.3% 168
2016	52.0% 2,081	36.0% 1,440	12.0% 478
2012	54.9% 1,791	41.1% 1,342	4.0% 131
2008	56.3% 1,787	40.2% 1,276	3.4% 109
2004	46.4% 1,420	51.9% 1,589	1.7% 51
2000	47.2% 1,175	47.1% 1,173	5.7% 142

Since 2008, Cornelius has favored the Democratic Party, in line with Washington County as a whole. Previously, it was more competitive; in 2000, Democrat Al Gore won the city by just two votes and in 2004 it voted for Republican President George W. Bush. Since Barack Obama's 2008 victory, Democrats have consistently won Cornelius by double digits.

== Education ==
It is divided between the Forest Grove School District and the Hillsboro School District.

In 1851, the Cornelius Elementary School District 2 was founded. The Cornelius district was dissolved in 1960, with the western parts of the enrollment area going to the Forest Grove district and the eastern part going to the Hillsboro district.

There are few private schools in the Cornelius area. Swallowtail School moved from Hillsboro in July 2016, occupying the former Emmaus Christian School building.

== Transportation ==
Cornelius is within the TriMet district, and public transit service is provided by TriMet's bus line 57-TV Highway, which operates seven days a week. Line 57 connects the city with Forest Grove, to the west, and with Hillsboro and Beaverton to the east, via the Tualatin Valley Highway (known by locals as "TV Highway"). It also links Cornelius with the Portland region's light rail system (MAX) in Hillsboro.

The airport serving Cornelius is Skyport Airport.

== See also ==
- Virginia Garcia Memorial Health Center
