= Forest Grove City Library =

Library in Forest Grove, Oregon, U.S.

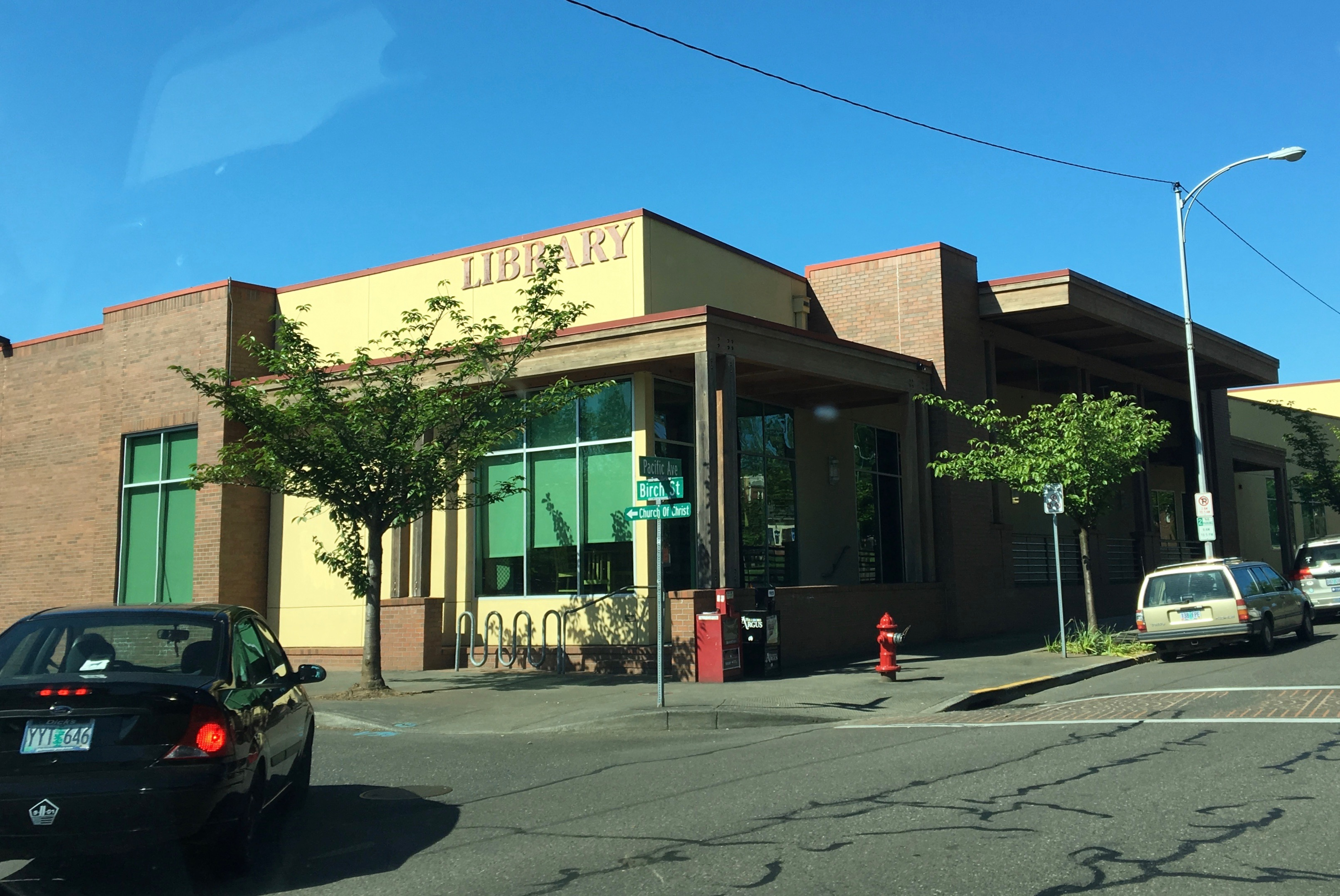
- 45.5196°N 123.1092°W
- Location: Forest Grove, Oregon, United States
- Established: 1908
- Branch of: Washington County Cooperative Library Services

The Forest Grove City Library serves Forest Grove, Oregon, and is part of the Washington County Cooperative Library Services.

== History ==
Established in 1908, the library was the first public library in Washington County. Supported by a tax levy from the beginning, the library became a city department in 1974. Since the late 1970s, the library has been located in the Municipal Services Building; its space was enlarged in the late 1990s.
