= Tigard Public Library =

Library in Tigard, Oregon, U.S.

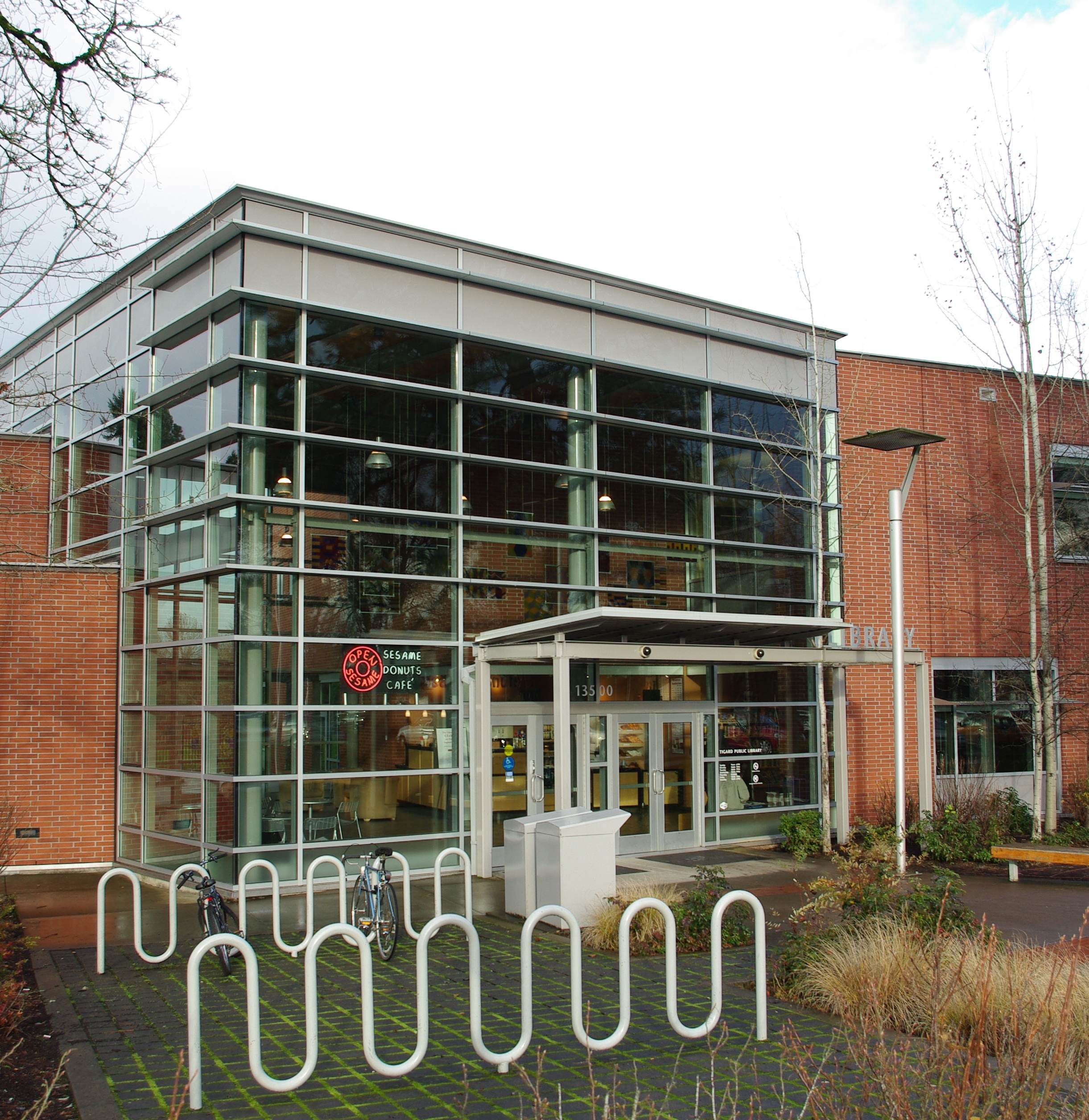
- Entrance to the library in 2012
- 45.42266°N 122.7649°W
- Location: Tigard, Oregon, United States
- Established: 1963
- Branch of: Washington County Cooperative Library Services

Collection
- Size: 233,240 (2012)

Access and use
- Circulation: 1,522,367 (2012)
- Population served: 59,265 (2012)
- Members: 37,106 (2012)

Other information
- Budget: $5.5 million (2012)
- Director: Halsted Bernard
- Employees: 39 (2012)
- Website: www.tigard-or.gov/library/

Tigard Public Library is the library within Washington County Cooperative Library Services serving Tigard in the U.S. state of Oregon. Established in 1963, the current 48,000-square-foot (4,500 m^{2}) building opened in 2004 on Hall Boulevard. As of 2012, Margaret Barnes was the director of the library that had a collection of about 230,000 items making 1.5 million loans of those items.

== History ==
In 1963, the Tigard Junior Women's Club lobbied the city council to start a library in the city that incorporated a few years prior in 1961. The city agreed to establish a library, but did not fund the project. The next year, the Tigard Library opened in downtown on Main Street at the former city hall, but it was operated by volunteers with an initial collection of 1,011 books, most of which had been donated during a door-to-door campaign. During the second year, the city contributed $175 for part-time staffing.

From 1976 to 1986 the library occupied a former mattress factory on Main Street. City residents approved a $2.2 million bond in 1984 to build a new library at Tigard's new civic center. In 1986, the library relocated to the building, where it remained until 2004. The civic center and library were dedicated on May 17, 1986. In 1998, the city began the process of looking to build a new library building, as the library had outgrown its approximately 12,000-square-foot (1,100 m^{2}) building. At that time the library's collection had grown to 104,000 items. However, voters turned down a bond request that year that also would have paid for other city buildings.

In May 2002, Tigard voters passed a $13 million bond measure to construct a new library building. The city bought 14 acres (5.7 ha) along Fanno Creek in 2003 for the new library, which was located on a former farm with orchards and a farmhouse. The city hoped to restore the two-story farmhouse and open it to the public, but it burned down in August 2003, during construction of the new library. On August 2, 2004, the new library building was opened at 13500 Southwest Hall. The project cost $14.3 million, and included the costs of the land as well as construction on the 48,000-square-foot (4,500 m^{2}) structure.

Part of the grounds of the new library were fenced-off in September 2008 because of arsenic contamination linked to the former orchard on the land. In January 2010, the library started allowing self-service pick-up of books people have reserved. The Tigard Public Library Foundation funded a feasibility study in 2010 to determine whether a second library was needed. In July 2012, city budget cuts forced the library to start closing on Thursdays. Thursday operations resumed in 2016. By the library's 50th anniversary, the collection had grown to more than 235,000 items, now including books, CDs, and movies.

== Facilities and services ==
Tigard's library building is a two-story, brick-faced structure with 47,500 square feet (4,410 m^{2}). The building was designed by architects SRG Partnership and built by Hoffman Construction Company. Features include a 170-seat community room, gas fireplace, and glass atrium. As of 2012, the library has a population served of 59,265 and 37,106 registered borrowers. There were fifteen librarians out of 39 total employees, and an annual budget of about $5.5 million. Within its collection are 188,069 print items, 19,473 audio items, and 23,920 video items, with a total collection size of 233,240. Total circulation (loans) that year was 1,522,367.
