= West Slope, Oregon =

Unincorporated community in the state of Oregon, United States

- Census-designated place (CDP)
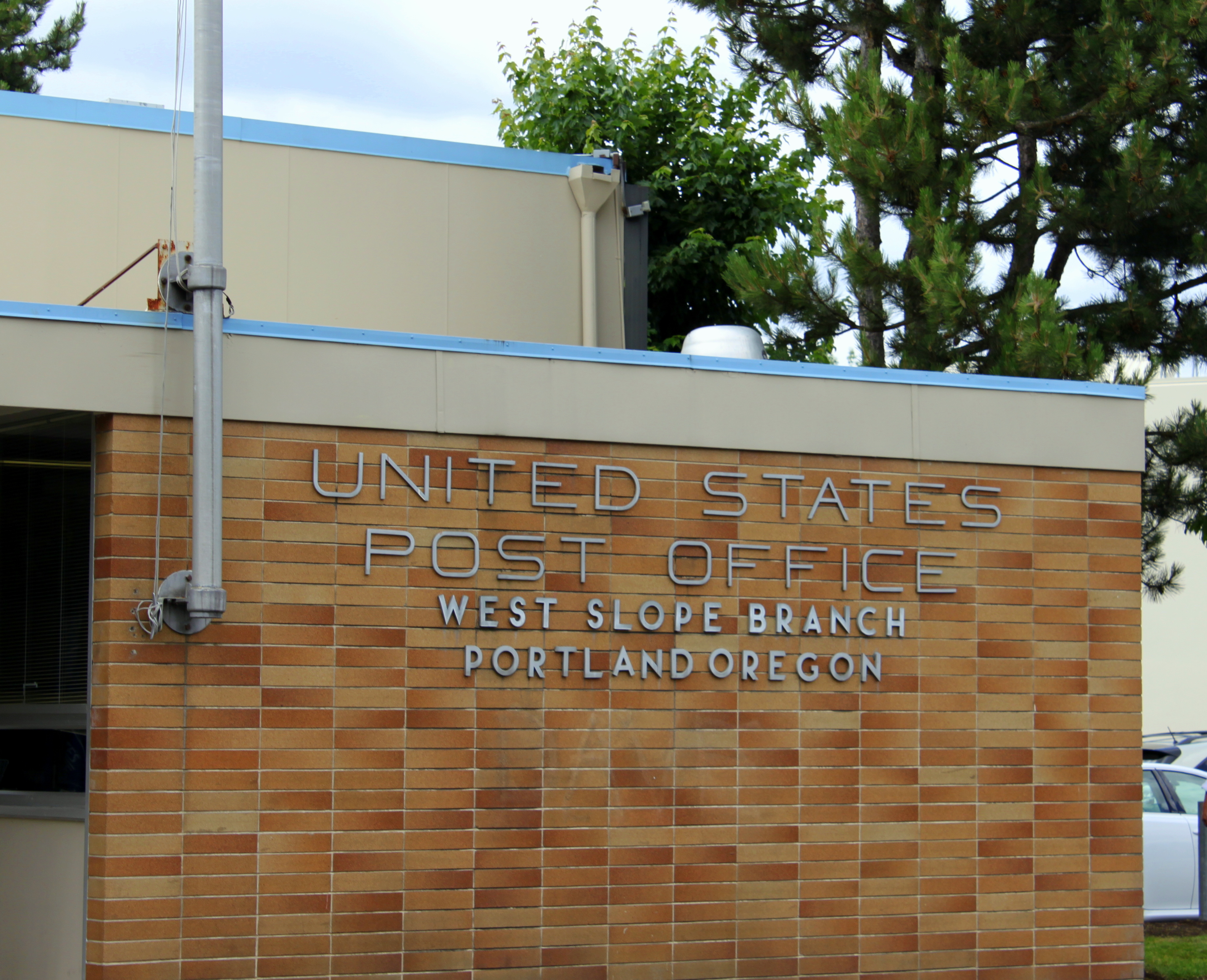
- Post office in West Slope

- Location of West Slope, Oregon
- Coordinates: 45°29′58″N 122°44′58″W
- Country: United States
- State: Oregon
- County: Washington

Area
  - Total: 1.62 sq mi (4.19 km^{2})
  - Land: 1.62 sq mi (4.19 km^{2})
  - Water: 0 sq mi (0.00 km^{2})
- Elevation: 243 ft (74 m)

Population (2020)
  - Total: 7,223
  - Density: 4,468.9/sq mi (1,725.46/km^{2})
- Time zone: UTC-8 (Pacific (PST))
  - Summer (DST): UTC-7 (PDT)
- ZIP code: 97225
- Area code: 503
- FIPS code: 41-80900
- GNIS feature ID: 2409568

West Slope is an unincorporated suburb, neighborhood of Beaverton, Oregon, United States and a census-designated place. It is in Washington County, to the east of Cedar Hills, to the northwest of Raleigh Hills and south of U.S. Route 26. Fire protection and EMS services are provided through Tualatin Valley Fire and Rescue.

As of the 2020 census, West Slope had a population of 7,223.

In a plan agreed to by the county and Beaverton, West Slope was scheduled for annexation to Beaverton by 2010.

== Geography ==
According to the United States Census Bureau, the neighborhood has a total area of 1.7 square miles (4.4 km^{2}), all land.

== Education ==
The majority is in the Beaverton School District 48J. A portion to the northwest is in the Portland School District 1J.

West Sylvan Middle School is located in West Slope south of U.S. Route 26. In the public school district, most children will attend either Raleigh Park Elementary, Ridgewood Elementary, or William Walker elementary schools. Middle school students will mostly enter either Whitford Middle School or Cedar Park Middle School. High school students will typically attend Beaverton High School.

== Demographics ==
Historical population
Census	Pop.	Note	%±
2020	7,223		—
U.S. Decennial Census

As of the census of 2000, there were 6,442 people, 2,873 households, and 1,643 families residing in the neighborhood. The population density was 3,727.1 inhabitants per square mile (1,439.0/km^{2}). There were 3,057 housing units at an average density of 1,768.7 per square mile (682.9/km^{2}). The racial makeup of the neighborhood was 88.70% White, 4.30% Asian, 1.44% African American, 0.70% Native American, 0.16% Pacific Islander, 2.22% from other races, and 2.48% from two or more races. Hispanic or Latino of any race were 4.77% of the population.

There were 2,873 households, out of which 26.2% had children under the age of 18 living with them, 45.9% were married couples living together, 7.8% had a female householder with no husband present, and 42.8% were non-families. 32.1% of all households were made up of individuals, and 8.4% had someone living alone who was 65 years of age or older. The average household size was 2.22 and the average family size was 2.85.

In the neighborhood the population was spread out, with 21.2% under the age of 18, 8.5% from 18 to 24, 30.8% from 25 to 44, 25.9% from 45 to 64, and 13.6% who were 65 years of age or older. The median age was 39 years. For every 100 females, there were 95.8 males. For every 100 females age 18 and over, there were 95.8 males.

The median income for a household in the neighborhood was $50,984, and the median income for a family was $66,974. Males had a median income of $46,232 versus $35,890 for females. The per capita income for the neighborhood was $32,514. About 6.8% of families and 8.1% of the population were below the poverty line, including 10.1% of those under age 18 and 0.6% of those age 65 or over.
