= National Register of Historic Places listings in Clackamas County, Oregon =

Location of Clackamas County in Oregon

This list presents the full set of buildings, structures, objects, sites, or districts designated on the National Register of Historic Places in Clackamas County, Oregon, United States, and offers brief descriptive information about each of them. The National Register recognizes places of national, state, or local historic significance across the United States. Out of over 90,000 National Register sites nationwide, Oregon is home to over 2,000, and 94 of those are found partially or wholly in Clackamas County.

This National Park Service list is complete through NPS recent listings posted September 11, 2026.

== Current listings ==
	Name on the Register	Image	Date listed	Location	City or town	Description
1	Capt. John C. Ainsworth House	Capt. John C. Ainsworth House	March 26, 1973 (#73001573)	19130 Lot Whitcomb Drive; 45°19′43″N 122°36′17″W	Oregon City	John C. Ainsworth (1822–1893), businessman and co-founder of the Oregon Steam Navigation Company, built this house in 1851, where he lived until Portland supplanted Oregon City as the commercial center of the Northwest. Its monumental Neoclassical design and imposing two-story, pillared portico made it unique in its period.
2	Daniel Albright Farm	Daniel Albright Farm	October 30, 1979 (#79003734)	9912 S. Wildcat Road; 45°04′10″N 122°39′36″W	Marquam vicinity	
3	Herman Anthony Farm	Herman Anthony Farm	March 26, 1979 (#79002041)	10205 S. New Era Road; 45°17′44″N 122°39′19″W	Canby	
4	Charles C. Babcock House	Charles C. Babcock House	October 29, 1982 (#82001966)	1214 Washington Street; 45°21′36″N 122°36′04″W	Oregon City	
5	Bagby Guard Station	Bagby Guard Station	September 13, 1999 (#99001088)	Forest Service Road 70; 44°56′05″N 122°10′25″W	Estacada vicinity	
6	Lawrence D. Bailey House	Lawrence D. Bailey House	February 23, 1990 (#90000290)	13908 SE Fairoaks Avenue; 45°25′23″N 122°39′04″W	Milwaukie	
7	Horace Baker Log Cabin	Horace Baker Log Cabin	December 12, 1976 (#76001578)	18006 S. Gronlund Road; 45°23′24″N 122°29′48″W	Carver vicinity	
8	Dr. Forbes Barclay House	Dr. Forbes Barclay House	November 5, 1974 (#74001676)	719 Center Street; 45°21′27″N 122°36′20″W	Oregon City	Dr. Barclay built this house in 1849, after retiring from 10 years as a physician with the Hudson's Bay Company at Fort Vancouver. In Oregon City, he continued medical practice as well as holding a variety of public offices. The house was moved from its original location to its present address in the 1930s.
9	Barlow Road	Barlow Road	April 13, 1992 (#92000334)	Mount Hood National Forest (Note: The Barlow Road is a linear district that runs north of and roughly parallel to the line of the White and Salmon rivers from southwest of Wamic to Rhododendron. See also Wasco and Hood River counties.); 45°13′51″N 121°34′43″W	Wamic to Rhododendron	Beginning with its construction by Sam Barlow in 1846, this toll road provided the first overland connection for wagons between The Dalles and Oregon City over Mount Hood, and offered a majority of Oregon Trail emigrants an alternative to the hazardous raft passage down the Columbia River from The Dalles to Fort Vancouver.
10	William Barlow House	William Barlow House	February 15, 1977 (#77001098)	24670 S Oregon Route 99E; 45°15′09″N 122°43′03″W	Barlow	
11	John M. and Elizabeth Bates House No. 2	John M. and Elizabeth Bates House No. 2	June 13, 1990 (#90000847)	16948 SW Bryant Road; 45°24′11″N 122°43′23″W	Lake Oswego	
12	John M. and Elizabeth Bates House No. 3	John M. and Elizabeth Bates House No. 3	June 14, 1990 (#90000831)	16884 SW Bryant Road; 45°24′12″N 122°43′23″W	Lake Oswego	
13	John M. and Elizabeth Bates House No. 4	John M. and Elizabeth Bates House No. 4	June 13, 1990 (#90000832)	4101 Southshore Boulevard; 45°24′16″N 122°43′05″W	Lake Oswego	This is the fourth and final residence designed by architect Wade Pipes (1877–1961) for his friends John and Elizabeth Bates, and the penultimate and finest commission of his career. In it, Pipes designed not only the building but also the landscape, furnishings, and interior finishes, representing the culmination of his work as a pivotal figure in the Arts and Crafts movement in Oregon.
14	Bell Station Store	Bell Station Store	September 10, 1987 (#87001558)	9300 SE Bell Avenue; 45°27′21″N 122°35′34″W	Milwaukie vicinity	
15	Dr. Walter Black House	Dr. Walter Black House	February 20, 1991 (#91000045)	1125 Maple Street; 45°24′35″N 122°40′18″W	Lake Oswego	
16	W. S. and Gladys Boutwell House	W. S. and Gladys Boutwell House	February 20, 1991 (#91000052)	920 SW Fairway Road; 45°25′01″N 122°41′09″W	Lake Oswego	
17	John F. and John H. Broetje House	John F. and John H. Broetje House	September 15, 1987 (#87001498)	3101 SE Courtney Avenue; 45°25′21″N 122°37′51″W	Milwaukie	
18	Buena Vista Social Clubhouse	Buena Vista Social Clubhouse	June 26, 2020 (#100005321)	1601 Jackson Street; 45°21′38″N 122°35′36″W	Oregon City	
19	Camp Namanu	Camp Namanu	March 4, 2024 (#100009998)	10300 SE Camp Namanu; 45°26′51″N 122°14′30″W	Sandy	
20	Canby City Hall		September 11, 2026 (#100013379)	182 N Holly Street; 45°15′46″N 122°41′39″W	Canby	
21	Canemah Historic District	Canemah Historic District	October 11, 1978 (#78002279)	Roughly bounded by the Willamette River, 5th Avenue, Marshall Street, and Paquet Street; 45°20′46″N 122°37′20″W	Oregon City	Established at the upper end of the Willamette Falls portage, Canemah became a transportation hub and center of steamboat construction and river shipping in a period (about 1850–1878) when these industries were critical to the Oregon economy. It retained much of its 19th-century character as it developed into a residential neighborhood of Oregon City by the late 20th century.
22	Clackamas Lake Ranger Station Historic District	Clackamas Lake Ranger Station Historic District	April 22, 1981 (#81000477)	Forest Service Road 42; 45°06′11″N 121°44′50″W	Government Camp vicinity	
23	Elizabeth Clark House	Elizabeth Clark House	October 25, 1990 (#90001590)	812 John Adams Street; 45°21′24″N 122°36′12″W	Oregon City	
24	Harvey Cross House	Harvey Cross House	October 30, 1979 (#79002043)	809 Washington Street; 45°21′27″N 122°36′15″W	Oregon City	This stately house, built in the late 1880s, is one of the finest examples of Italianate residential architecture in Oregon City. It was built for prominent citizen Harvey Cross, a county judge and state senator, investor in real estate and transportation infrastructure, (Note: Cross most notably invested in the real estate development that became the city of Gladstone and in the Barlow Road.) and promoter of the Chautauqua movement in Oregon.
25	Damascus School	Damascus School	December 3, 1980 (#80003304)	14711 SE Anderson Road; 45°24′59″N 122°27′31″W	Damascus	
26	Marshall Dana House	Marshall Dana House	March 9, 1992 (#92000083)	15725 SE Dana Avenue; 45°24′33″N 122°38′56″W	Milwaukie	
27	John and Magdalena Davis Farm	John and Magdalena Davis Farm	September 21, 2005 (#05001056)	13678 S Spangler Road; 45°15′20″N 122°35′25″W	Oregon City vicinity	
28	Horace L. Dibble House	Horace L. Dibble House	December 19, 1974 (#74001675)	616 S Molalla Avenue; 45°08′34″N 122°34′46″W	Molalla	
29	Francis Ermatinger House	Francis Ermatinger House	September 17, 1987 (#77001099)	619 6th Street; 45°21′20″N 122°36′20″W	Oregon City	
30	First Congregational Church of Oregon City	First Congregational Church of Oregon City	August 26, 1982 (#82003723)	710 6th Street; 45°21′19″N 122°36′18″W	Oregon City	
31	Philip Foster Farm	Philip Foster Farm	August 15, 1980 (#80003305)	29912 SE. Oregon Route 211; 45°21′31″N 122°21′19″W	Eagle Creek	
32	Clarence E. Francis House	Clarence E. Francis House	February 19, 1993 (#93000015)	9717 SE Cambridge Lane; 45°27′09″N 122°38′59″W	Milwaukie	
33	Erwin Charles Hackett House	Erwin Charles Hackett House	February 14, 1985 (#85000292)	415 17th Street; 45°21′52″N 122°35′53″W	Oregon City	
34	Hall–Chaney House	Hall–Chaney House	September 8, 1988 (#88001522)	10200 SE Cambridge Lane; 45°26′57″N 122°38′55″W	Milwaukie vicinity	
35	Historic City Hall	Historic City Hall	October 18, 2021 (#100007086)	22825 Willamette Dr. 45°21′36″N 122°36′39″W	West Linn	
36	William L. Holmes House	William L. Holmes House	December 2, 1974 (#74001678)	536 Holmes Lane; 45°20′32″N 122°36′04″W	Oregon City	
37	Howard's Gristmill	Howard's Gristmill	December 10, 1981 (#81000478)	26401 S Oregon Route 213; 45°13′26″N 122°34′55″W	Mulino	
38	Iron Workers' Cottage	Iron Workers' Cottage	July 16, 2009 (#09000531)	40 Wilbur Street; 45°24′46″N 122°39′48″W	Lake Oswego	
39	C. S. "Sam" Jackson Log House	C. S. "Sam" Jackson Log House	December 9, 1981 (#81000479)	14999 S Springwater Road; 45°23′21″N 122°29′36″W	Oregon City vicinity	
40	Carl C. Jantzen Estate	Carl C. Jantzen Estate	February 23, 1990 (#90000277)	1850 North Shore Road; 45°24′52″N 122°41′14″W	Lake Oswego	
41	Andrew J. and Anna B. Johnston Farmstead	Andrew J. and Anna B. Johnston Farmstead	February 21, 1997 (#97000140)	18025 S Harding Road; 45°20′43″N 122°25′22″W	Oregon City	
42	John and Elizabeth Kinsman House	John and Elizabeth Kinsman House	February 22, 2021 (#100006185)	17014 SE Oatfield Road; 45°24′01″N 122°36′18″W	Milwaukie	This house, completed in 1964, is a locally significant and almost unaltered example of the Contemporary Style of the late 1950s and early 1960s. Designer/builder John Kinsman built the house for himself and his wife Elizabeth using design elements characteristic of his other projects.
43	William Knight House	William Knight House	November 5, 1986 (#86002961)	525 SW 4th Avenue; 45°15′30″N 122°41′46″W	Canby	
44	Kraft–Brandes–Culbertson Farmstead	Kraft–Brandes–Culbertson Farmstead	November 1, 1982 (#82001500)	2525 N Baker Drive; 45°17′12″N 122°42′26″W	Canby vicinity	Misspelled Culberston in NRHP summary.
45	Ladd Estate Company Model House	Ladd Estate Company Model House	October 30, 1989 (#89001859)	432 Country Club Road; 45°25′16″N 122°40′34″W	Lake Oswego	
46	Lake Oswego Hunt Club Ensemble	Lake Oswego Hunt Club Ensemble	January 4, 1988 (#87002236)	2725 SW Iron Mountain Boulevard; 45°24′45″N 122°42′19″W	Lake Oswego	
47	Lake Oswego Odd Fellows Hall	Lake Oswego Odd Fellows Hall	March 7, 1979 (#79002042)	295 Durham Street; 45°24′49″N 122°39′45″W	Lake Oswego	
48	Charles David Latourette House	Charles David Latourette House	February 27, 1980 (#80003306)	503 High Street; 45°21′22″N 122°36′30″W	Oregon City	
49	DeWitt Clinton Latourette House	DeWitt Clinton Latourette House	March 5, 1992 (#92000127)	914 Madison Street; 45°21′24″N 122°36′03″W	Oregon City	
50	Lewthwaite–Moffatt House	Lewthwaite–Moffatt House	January 21, 1994 (#93001501)	4891 Willamette Falls Drive; 45°21′35″N 122°36′47″W	West Linn	
51	Macksburg Lutheran Church	Macksburg Lutheran Church	June 14, 1982 (#82003722)	10190 S Macksburg Road; 45°12′49″N 122°39′25″W	Canby	
52	Mathieson–Worthington House	Mathieson–Worthington House	June 1, 1990 (#90000837)	885 McVey Avenue; 45°24′33″N 122°40′15″W	Lake Oswego	
53	Morton Matthew McCarver House	Morton Matthew McCarver House	January 21, 1974 (#74001677)	554 Warner Parrott Road; 45°20′15″N 122°36′41″W	Oregon City	Prefabricated in New England and shipped around Cape Horn, this house was erected by Morton McCarver in 1850. It was a showpiece in a period when most settler homes were much less elegant. Born in Kentucky, McCarver emigrated to Oregon in 1843, served as Speaker of the Provisional Legislature in 1844 and 1845, and was widely active on the American frontier. (Note: In addition to his settlement and farming at Oregon City and service in the Provisional Legislature, McCarver had a hand in founding several towns, including Burlington, Iowa, Linnton, Oregon, Sacramento, California, and Tacoma, Washington, served as Commissary-General of the Iowa Territory, sat in the California Constitutional Convention of 1849, and co-owned a lucrative ship, the Ocean Bird, active in coastal and Pacific trade.)
54	Dr. Edward and Anne McLean House	Dr. Edward and Anne McLean House	January 30, 2025 (#100011430)	5350 River Street; 45°21′52″N 122°36′25″W	West Linn	
55	McLoughlin House National Historic Site	McLoughlin House National Historic Site	October 15, 1966 (#66000637)	713 Center Street; 45°21′26″N 122°36′21″W	Oregon City	Dr. John McLoughlin, known as the "Father of Oregon" for the support he provided to emigrants on the Oregon Trail, built this house in 1846 upon his retirement from 20 years as Chief Factor of the Hudson's Bay Company's Fort Vancouver. In retirement, he continued his activities as mayor of Oregon City, a private businessman, and philanthropist. The house was moved from its original location beside the Willamette River to its current blufftop site in 1909.
56	McLoughlin Promenade	McLoughlin Promenade	May 15, 2014 (#14000179)	Roughly along Singer Hill west of High Street; 45°21′17″N 122°36′37″W	Oregon City	
57	James Milne House	James Milne House	March 12, 1979 (#79002044)	224 Center Street; 45°21′12″N 122°36′34″W	Oregon City	Carpenter-Gothic Revival house built by James Milne, a Canadian immigrant and carpenter from New Brunswick, in 1869.
58	Milwaukie City Hall	Milwaukie City Hall	September 11, 2026 (#100013378)	10722 SE Main St. 45°26′42″N 122°38′29″W	Milwaukie	
59	Oregon City Carnegie Library	Oregon City Carnegie Library	May 15, 2014 (#14000180)	606 John Adams Street; 45°21′19″N 122°36′15″W	Oregon City	
60	Oregon City Municipal Elevator	Oregon City Municipal Elevator	May 15, 2014 (#14000181)	610 Bluff Street; 45°21′25″N 122°36′28″W	Oregon City	
61	Oregon Iron Company Furnace	Oregon Iron Company Furnace	February 12, 1974 (#74001674)	George Rogers Park; 45°24′39″N 122°39′38″W	Lake Oswego	
62	Oregon Trail, Barlow Road Segment	Oregon Trail, Barlow Road Segment	November 20, 1974 (#74001679)	Wildwood Recreation Site; 45°21′49″N 121°59′07″W	Wemme vicinity	A 5-acre (20,000 m^{2}) property including a segment of an alternate route of the Oregon Trail/Barlow Road
63	Richard B. Petzold Building	Richard B. Petzold Building	March 5, 1992 (#92000084)	714 Main Street; 45°21′29″N 122°36′28″W	Oregon City	
64	Richard Petzold House	Richard Petzold House	October 31, 1985 (#85003452)	504 6th Street; 45°21′22″N 122°36′24″W	Oregon City	
65	Wilbur and Evelyn Reid's Alderbrook Lodge	Wilbur and Evelyn Reid's Alderbrook Lodge	January 23, 2004 (#03001477)	26863 E. Rolling Riffle Lane; 45°19′49″N 121°54′45″W	Rhododendron	
66	River Mill Hydroelectric Project	River Mill Hydroelectric Project	May 1, 2001 (#01000497)	30878 NW Evergreen Way; 45°17′56″N 122°20′48″W	Estacada vicinity	
67	Robbins–Melcher–Schatz Farmstead	Robbins–Melcher–Schatz Farmstead	February 19, 1993 (#93000017)	4875 SW Schatz Road; 45°21′26″N 122°43′40″W	Tualatin vicinity	
68	Rock Corral on the Barlow Road	Rock Corral on the Barlow Road	December 19, 1974 (#74001673)	Off U.S. Route 26 near the Sandy River; 45°23′00″N 122°03′56″W	Brightwood vicinity	This erratic boulder was a well-recognized landmark and frequent campsite along the final stages of the Oregon Trail after emigrants crossed the Cascades on the Barlow Road. With time, a semi-permanent wooden corral was built around "the Rock". Reaching the Rock Corral signaled to emigrants that their long journey was almost over, and the most difficult stretches were passed.
69	Rock Creek Methodist Church	Rock Creek Methodist Church	October 29, 1975 (#75001580)	Intersection of S. Sconce Road and S. Stuwe Road; 45°09′32″N 122°42′51″W	Molalla vicinity	
70	Osco C. Roehr House	Osco C. Roehr House	October 17, 2012 (#12000877)	128 North Shore Circle; 45°24′53″N 122°40′23″W	Lake Oswego	
71	George Rogers House	George Rogers House	October 3, 1996 (#96001068)	59 SW Wilbur Street; 45°24′47″N 122°39′48″W	Lake Oswego	
72	Walter Rosenfeld Estate	Walter Rosenfeld Estate	May 17, 2003 (#03000420)	15361 S. Clackamas River Drive; 45°23′44″N 122°32′52″W	Oregon City	
73	Sherrard–Fenton House	Sherrard–Fenton House	February 20, 1991 (#91000051)	13100 SW Riverside Drive; 45°25′51″N 122°39′18″W	Lake Oswego	
74	William Shindler House	William Shindler House	January 18, 1990 (#89001867)	3235 SE Harrison Street; 45°26′48″N 122°37′45″W	Milwaukie	
75	Shipley–Cook Farmstead	Shipley–Cook Farmstead	January 29, 2008 (#07001505)	18451 SW Stafford Road; 45°23′32″N 122°41′26″W	Lake Oswego vicinity	
76	Silcox Hut	Silcox Hut	January 19, 1985 (#85000144)	Timberline Road; 45°20′40″N 121°42′34″W	Government Camp	
77	R. S. Smith Motor Company Building	R. S. Smith Motor Company Building	January 21, 1994 (#93001502)	39150 Pioneer Boulevard; 45°23′46″N 122°15′38″W	Sandy	
78	St. John the Evangelist Roman Catholic Church	St. John the Evangelist Roman Catholic Church	December 21, 1979 (#79002045)	68835 E Barlow Trail Road; 45°21′08″N 121°57′23″W	Welches vicinity	
79	George Lincoln Storey House	George Lincoln Storey House	March 10, 1983 (#83002144)	910 Pierce Street; 45°21′12″N 122°35′38″W	Oregon City	
80	Hiram A. Straight House	Hiram A. Straight House	February 17, 1978 (#78002280)	16000 S. Depot Lane; 45°22′29″N 122°35′01″W	Oregon City	
81	Timberline Lodge	Timberline Lodge	November 12, 1973 (#73001572)	6 miles (9.6 km) north of Government Camp in Mount Hood National Forest; 45°19′52″N 121°42′36″W	Government Camp	President Franklin D. Roosevelt dedicated this lodge at an elevation of 6,000 feet (1,830 m) on the south slope of Mount Hood in 1937. It is considered the finest example of 1930s-era "mountain architecture" by the Works Progress Administration.
82	Upper Sandy Guard Station Cabin	Upper Sandy Guard Station Cabin	September 9, 2009 (#09000705)	4.5 mi (7.2 km). E. of jct. FS Rds. 18 and 1825, Mt. Hood National Forest; 45°22′38″N 121°46′58″W	Government Camp vicinity	
83	William Hatchette Vaughan House	William Hatchette Vaughan House	May 27, 1993 (#93000456)	14900 S Macksburg Road; 45°10′15″N 122°33′08″W	Molalla vicinity	
84	Fred Vonder Ahe House and Summer Kitchen	Fred Vonder Ahe House and Summer Kitchen	March 26, 1976 (#76001580)	625 Metzler Avenue; 45°08′32″N 122°34′51″W	Molalla	
85	Nicholas O. Walden House	Nicholas O. Walden House	September 7, 1984 (#84002935)	1847 SE 5th Avenue; 45°20′34″N 122°39′14″W	West Linn	
86	Waverley Country Club Clubhouse	Waverley Country Club Clubhouse	March 27, 2013 (#13000118)	1100 SE Waverly Drive; 45°26′57″N 122°39′09″W	Portland	
87	Clara and Samuel B. Weinstein House	Clara and Samuel B. Weinstein House	March 5, 1992 (#92000082)	16847 SW Greenbriar Road; 45°24′13″N 122°42′29″W	Lake Oswego	
88	White–Kellogg House	White–Kellogg House	May 16, 1989 (#89000415)	19000 S. Central Point Road; 45°19′53″N 122°36′44″W	Oregon City vicinity	
89	Willamette Falls Locks	Willamette Falls Locks	February 5, 1974 (#74001680)	West bank of the Willamette River; 45°21′26″N 122°36′52″W	West Linn	
90	Willamette Historic District (Note: The Willamette Historic District was originally entered on the National Register as the Willamette Falls Neighborhood Historic District. The name was changed in 2013.)	Willamette Historic District	September 24, 2009 (#09000768)	Roughly bound by Knapps Alley, 12th Street, 4th Avenue, and 15th Street; 45°20′34″N 122°39′19″W	West Linn	
91	Willamette National Cemetery	Willamette National Cemetery	July 5, 2016 (#16000426)	11800 SE Mount Scott Boulevard; 45°27′37″N 122°32′27″W	Portland	
92	Willamette River (Oregon City) Bridge (No. 357)	Willamette River (Oregon City) Bridge (No. 357)	July 1, 2005 (#05000639)	Highway 43 spanning the Willamette River; 45°21′33″N 122°36′35″W	Oregon City and West Linn	
93	Andrew P. Wilson House	Andrew P. Wilson House	June 1, 1990 (#90000838)	11188 SE 27th Avenue; 45°26′33″N 122°38′06″W	Milwaukie	
94	Zigzag Ranger Station	Zigzag Ranger Station	April 8, 1986 (#86000842)	70220 E. U.S. Route 26; 45°20′34″N 121°56′29″W	Zigzag	

== Former listings ==
	Name on the Register	Image	Date listed	Date removed	Location	City or town	Description
1	Charles W. Ertz House	Charles W. Ertz House	March 5, 1992 (#92000081)	December 7, 2011	1650 North Shore Road; 45°24′55″N 122°41′02″W	Lake Oswego	
2	Molalla Union High School	Molalla Union High School	May 31, 1996 (#96000622)	August 1, 2001	413 S. Molalla Avenue	Molalla	Irreparably damaged by the 1993 Scotts Mills earthquake.

== See also ==
- National Register of Historic Places listings in Oregon
- Listings in neighboring counties: Hood River, Marion, Multnomah, Wasco, Washington, Yamhill
- List of National Historic Landmarks in Oregon
- Historic preservation
- History of Oregon
- Lists of Oregon-related topics
