= List of Carnegie libraries in Oregon =

The following list of Carnegie libraries in Oregon provides detailed information on United States Carnegie libraries in Oregon, where 31 public libraries were built from 25 grants (totaling $478,000) awarded by the Carnegie Corporation of New York from 1901 to 1915. In addition, one academic library was built at Pacific University.

== Key ==
Building still operating as a library
Building standing, but now serving another purpose
Building no longer standing
Building listed on the National Register of Historic Places
Building contributes to a historic district on the National Register of Historic Places

== Public libraries ==
	Library	City or town	Image	Date granted	Grant amount	Location	Notes
1	Albany Carnegie Library (Albany, Oregon)	Albany		Apr 8, 1911	$12,500	302 SW Ferry St.	Part of the Monteith Historic District (info)
2	Ashland Carnegie Library	Ashland		Jun 25, 1909	$15,000		
3	Baker City Carnegie Library	Baker City		Dec 13, 1907	$25,000	2020 Auburn Ave, Baker City, OR, 97814	Now known as the Crossroads Arts Center and part of the Baker Historic District (info)
	Coos Bay Carnegie Library – See Marshfield Carnegie Library, below						
4	Dallas Carnegie Library	Dallas		Dec 7, 1911	$10,000	187 SW Court Street, Dallas, OR 97338	New library opened in 1990.
5	Enterprise Carnegie Library	Enterprise		Jan 31, 1913	$5,000		On the National Register of Historic Places (NRHP).
6	Eugene Carnegie Library	Eugene		Dec 14, 1903	$10,000		Demolished in the 1950s.
7	Grants Pass Carnegie Library	Grants Pass		Nov 18, 1903	$12,500		Built in 1921, it was the last-built Carnegie library in Oregon. Demolished in 1959.
8	Gresham Carnegie Library	Gresham		Feb 21, 1901	—	410 N. Main St. Gresham, OR	The building is on the National Register of Historic Places (NRHP) and is no longer part of the Multnomah County Library system. It is also known as the Gresham Pioneer Museum. (info)
9	Hermiston Carnegie Library	Hermiston		Jan 6, 1915	$5,000	215 E Gladys Ave, Hermiston, OR 97838	
10	Hillsboro Carnegie Library	Hillsboro		Nov 3, 1913	$10,000		
11	Hood River Carnegie Library	Hood River		Dec 3, 1912	$17,500		On the National Register of Historic Places (NRHP)
12	Klamath Falls Carnegie Library	Klamath Falls		Mar 14, 1913	$20,000	N. Alameda Ave. and Monclaire St.	Open 1914–1928, then used as a county public library and a high school library until 1957. Demolished to make room for school cafeteria in 1958.
13	La Grande Carnegie Library	La Grande		Apr 2, 1913	$12,500	1006 Penn Avenue, La Grande 97850	Now Art Center East a member based non-profit arts services organization.
14	Marshfield Carnegie Library	Marshfield		Apr 28, 1913	$12,500	515 W. Market St. Coos Bay, OR	Marshfield is now known as Coos Bay. The building is listed as the Coos Bay Carnegie Library in the National Register of Historic Places and is also known as the Coos Old Museum. (info)
15	McMinnville Carnegie Library	McMinnville		Jan 6, 1912	$10,000		(info)
16	Medford Carnegie Library	Medford		Jan 6, 1911	$20,000		On the National Register of Historic Places (NRHP)
17	Milton Carnegie Library	Milton		Jan 6, 1915	$7,500	815 S Main St, Milton-Freewater, OR 97862	Milton is now part of Milton-Freewater. The building is currently used as retail space.
18	Newberg Public Library	Newberg		Mar 18, 1911	$10,000		
19	Ontario Carnegie Library	Ontario		Dec 3, 1912	$7,500		Demolished in 1964, but photo exists at ontariocommunitylibrary.org
20	Oregon City Carnegie Library	Oregon City		Dec 23, 1911	$12,500	606 John Adams Street, Oregon City, OR 97045	Built in 1912–13. Currently in use as the City Public Library. Listed on the National Register of Historic Places.
21	Albina Library	Portland		Feb 21, 1901	$165,000	216 NE Knott Street, Portland, OR 97212	This building was in use as Multnomah County Library's "Title Wave Used Bookstore" until summer 2020, but now hosts the Albina Branch
22	Arleta Carnegie Library	Portland		Feb 21, 1901	—	4420 SE 64th Avenue, Portland, OR 97206	The building is no longer part of the Multnomah County Library system.
23	East Portland Carnegie Library	Portland		Feb 21, 1901	—	1110 SE Alder Street, Portland, OR 97214	The building is on the National Register of Historic Places (NRHP) and is no longer part of the Multnomah County Library system.
24	North Portland Library	Portland		1912	—	512 N Killingsworth Street, Portland, OR 97217	Still part of the Multnomah County Library system
25	St. Johns Carnegie Library	Portland		Feb 21, 1901	—	7510 N Charleston Avenue, Portland, OR 97203	St. Johns was formerly a separate city, annexed by Portland in 1915. This library is still part of the Multnomah County Library system.
26	South Portland Carnegie Library	Portland		Feb 21, 1901	—		No longer part of the Multnomah County Library system
27	Salem Carnegie Library	Salem		Dec 24, 1907	$27,500	790 State Street, Salem, OR 97301	Owned by Willamette University
28	The Dalles Carnegie Library	The Dalles		Mar 9, 1907	$10,000	220 E 4th Street, The Dalles, OR 97058	On the National Register of Historic Places (NRHP)
29	Umatilla County Library	Pendleton		Jan 6, 1915	$25,000	214 N. Main St. Pendleton, OR	On the National Register of Historic Places (NRHP). Building now serves as the Pendleton Center for the Arts.
30	Union Carnegie Library	Union		Apr 25, 1911	$5,500		Cornerstone shows 1912
31	Woodburn Carnegie Library	Woodburn		Jan 14, 1914	$10,000		

== Academic library ==
	Institution	Locality	Image	Date granted	Grant amount	Location	Notes
1	Pacific University	Forest Grove		Apr 5, 1905	$20,000		Built in 1912 as Pacific University's first library. Designed by Whidden & Lewis. Now used as classrooms.

== See also ==
- Lists of Oregon-related topics
- List of libraries in Oregon
