= R. S. Smith Motor Company Building =

- U.S. National Register of Historic Places
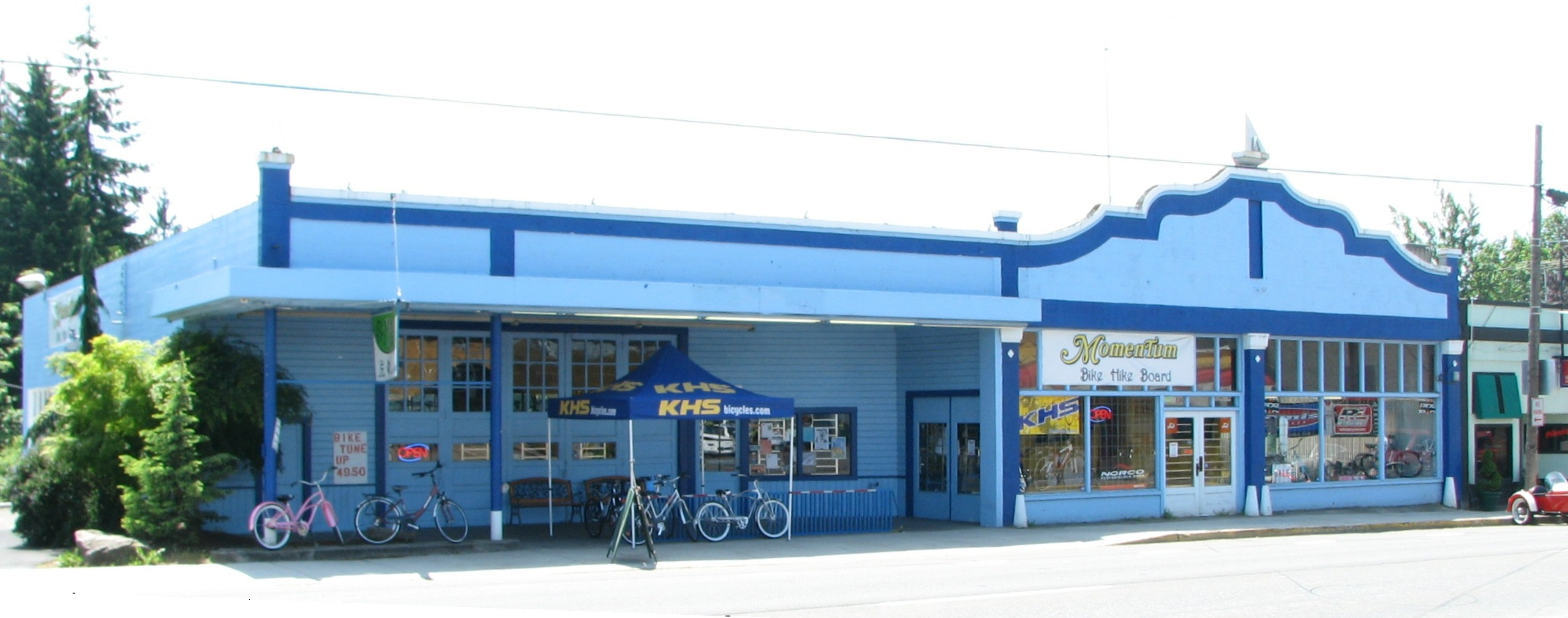

- Location within Oregon Location within the United States
- Location: 39150 Pioneer Boulevard; Sandy, Oregon, U.S.
- Coordinates: 45°23′46″N 122°15′38″W
- Area: .27 acres (0.11 ha)
- Built: 1930
- Architectural style: Mission Colonial Revival
- NRHP reference No.: 93001502
- Added to NRHP: January 21, 1994

The R. S. Smith Motor Company Building is a historic building in Sandy, Oregon, United States, built in 1930. It is listed on the National Register of Historic Places.

== History ==
The building was named for Robert S. Smith (1886–1966), a native of Clay Center, Kansas who settled in nearby Boring, Oregon, before relocating to Sandy between 1909 and 1911. In Sandy, Smith established the Sandy Blacksmith and Horseshoeing Shop, which he operated with his brother, Melvin.

The R. S. Smith Motor Building was constructed after Smith shifted from blacksmithing and entered the automobile sales business, opening a Ford Motor Company agency in 1912. The building was fashioned as an auto sales showroom and garage with a combined service station. Designed in the Mission Revival architectural style, the building, constructed in 1930, is primarily made of concrete. At the time of the building's construction, Smith was the mayor of Sandy. In addition to Ford vehicles, Smith would later sell Studebaker models in the 1960s. It was placed on the National Register of Historic Places in 1994.

== See also ==
- National Register of Historic Places listings in Clackamas County, Oregon

== Works cited ==
- National Park Service (December 13, 1993). "R. S. Smith Motor Company Building Registration Form". United States Department of the Interior.
