= Albina Library =

Multnomah County Library branch in Portland, Oregon, U.S.

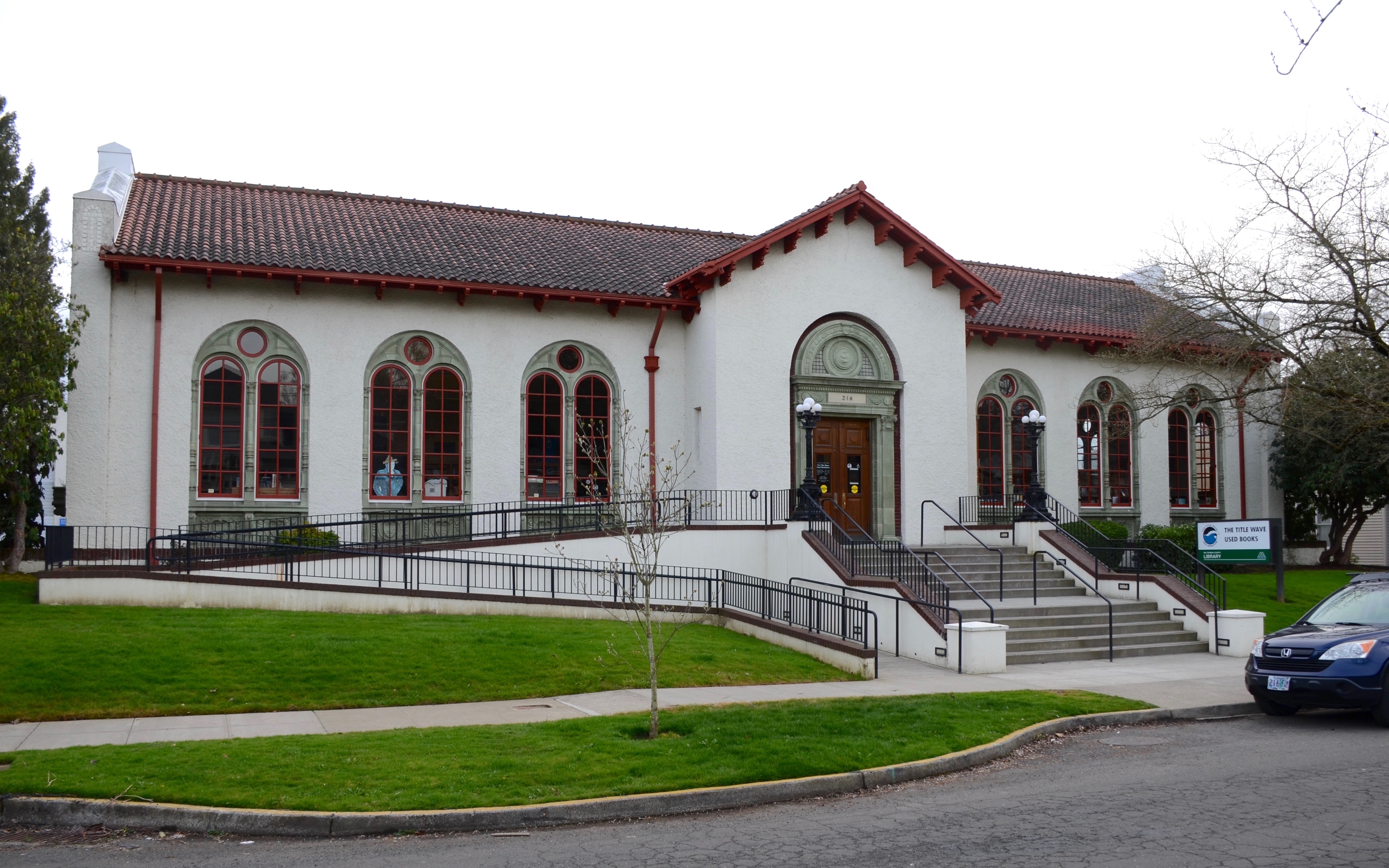
- Building exterior in 2018

- Location within Portland, Oregon

General information
- Location: 216 NE Knott Street, Portland, Oregon, United States
- Coordinates: 45.5416469°N 122.6630755°W
- Owner: Multnomah County Library

Renovating team
- Architects: Richard Brown Architects (exterior) and Thomas Hacker and Associates (interior)

Website
- Albina Library

The Albina Library is a branch of the Multnomah County Library, located in northeast Portland, Oregon. The library's origins date back to 1906 with the establishment of a small reading room that housed 100 books. The branch has relocated four times since then, moving back to the building which used to house The Title Wave Used Bookstore from a retail plaza in northeast Portland.

The branch offers the Multnomah County Library catalog of two million books, periodicals and other materials.

== History ==
Albina Library was established in 1906 as a small reading room which housed 100 books under the custodianship of Mrs. P.P. Leche. According to Multnomah County Library, the precise location of the reading room is unknown and circulation records for 1906 do not exist. In September 1907 the library relocated to a larger space within the Emporium building on Williams Avenue. The Library Association of Portland's 1907 annual report states, "... on September 16, the branch was opened in charge of Miss Ella G. Dewart. The eagerness with which the people of Albina young and old have taken advantage of this library has been a surprise even to those who believed most thoroughly in it. It has been almost impossible to keep the shelves supplied with books." In 1909 the library moved to Russell Street; by the end of the year the collection contained 3,149 volumes and circulation increased to 36,800 items.

In 1999, the library closed briefly for renovation and expansion, reopening that same year. Self-checkout stations and security gates were installed in 2010. In 2025, the library closed for renovations as part of a library bond that passed in 2020. The renovations added 22,000 square feet of additional library space while keeping the original building.

Over the years the library has hosted numerous activities, including arts and crafts workshops, book groups, performances for children, plays and reading sessions with therapy dogs. The library has also served as a Loaves & Fishes meal site as well as a ballot drop-off site during elections.

== See also ==
- List of Carnegie libraries in Oregon
