= Damascus School =

- U.S. National Register of Historic Places
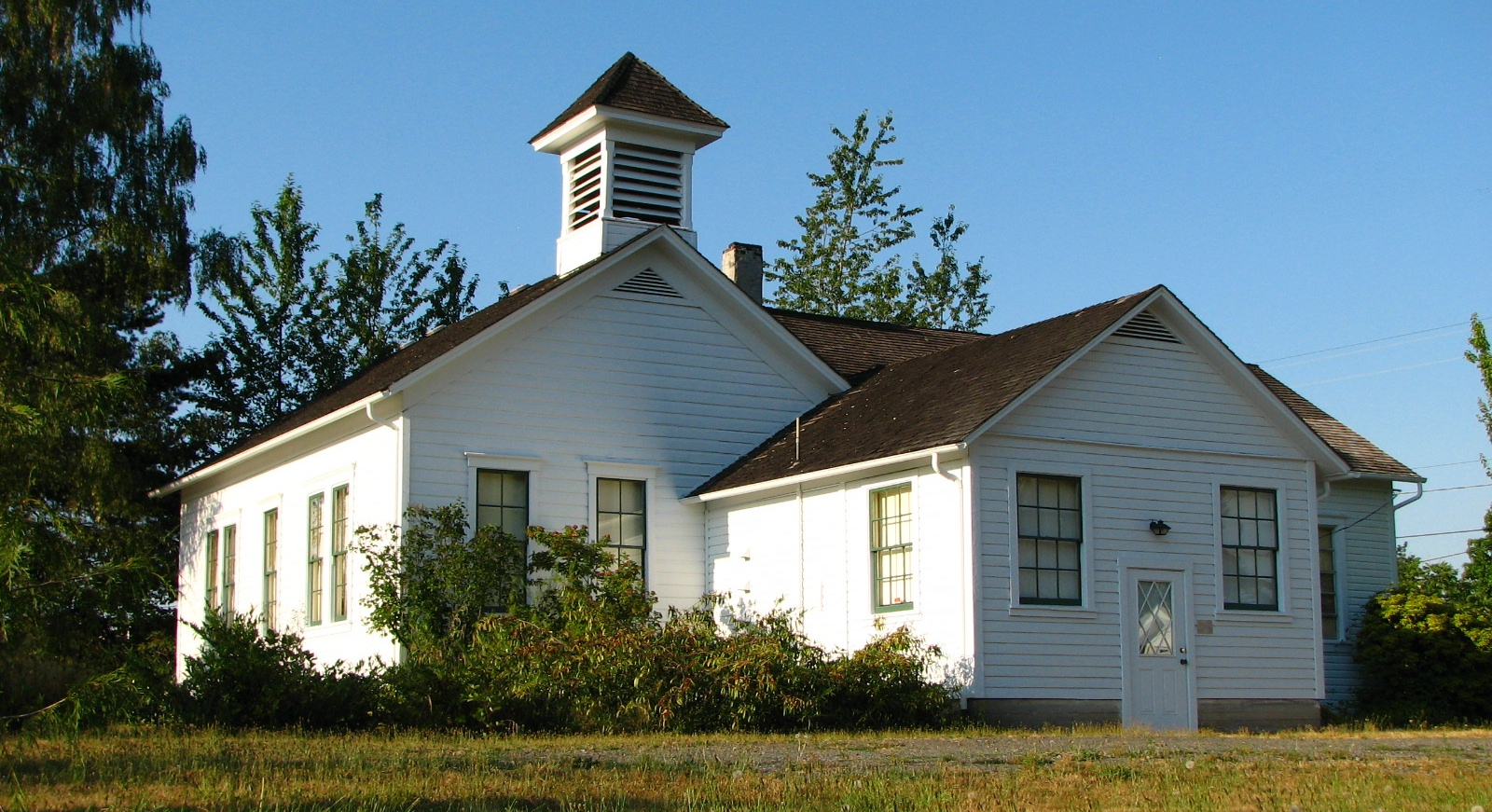

- Location within Oregon Location within the United States
- Location: 14711 SE Anderson Road; Damascus, Oregon, U.S.
- Coordinates: 45°24′59″N 122°27′31″W
- Built: 1876
- NRHP reference No.: 80003304
- Added to NRHP: December 3, 1980

Damascus School, also known as the Damascus Pioneer Craft School, is an historic schoolhouse in Damascus, Oregon, United States, built in 1876. It is listed on the National Register of Historic Places. It is one of the oldest rural schoolhouses still standing in the state of Oregon.

The school building is contemporarily home to the Damascus Fiber Arts School.

== See also ==
- National Register of Historic Places listings in Clackamas County, Oregon
