= Bagby Hot Springs =

Natural hot springs in Oregon, United States

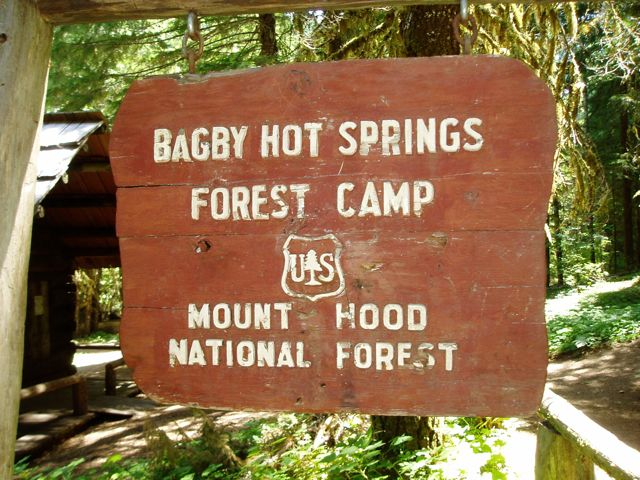
- Bagby USFS Sign
- Interactive map of Bagby Hot Springs
- Type: National Forest
- Location: Clackamas County, Oregon, US
- Coordinates: 44.93537°N 122.17356°W
- Operator: U.S. Forest Service
- Parking: Forest Service lot 1.5 miles (2.4 km) off-site

Bagby Hot Springs are natural hot springs in the Mount Hood National Forest, about 67 miles (108 km) southeast of Portland, Oregon, United States and about 98 miles (158 km) east of Salem, Oregon. The springs are in the Cascade Mountains in a heavily forested area at elevation 2280 ft (695 m). They are just outside the boundary of the Bull of the Woods Wilderness area.

== History ==
Bagby Hot Springs were used by Native Americans for hundreds or thousands of years. The springs are named after Bob Bagby, a prospector and hunter who came across the site in 1880.

The United States Forest Service built a small guard station next to the hot springs in 1913. The Bagby Guard Station was used to house Forest Service fire patrol crews during summer fire season. In 1974, the Forest Service built a new guard station. The original cabin was closed but was left standing. In 2006, the original guard cabin was renovated. Today, it is listed on the National Register of Historic Places but is not open to the public.

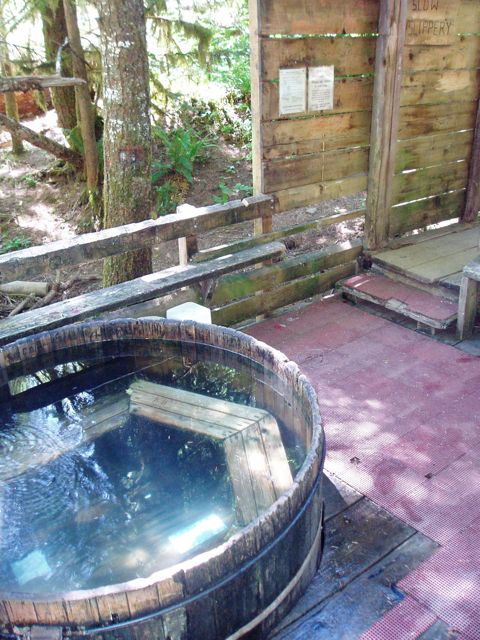
The main communal tub

A bathhouse was constructed at the hot springs in the 1920s. A fire, caused by bathers leaving unattended candles in the old wooden structure, burned the original wooden structures to the ground in 1979. It had become a popular spot for vandals and all-night drinking parties. The volunteer group Friends of Bagby (FOB) formed in 1981 to rebuild the bathhouses. Between 1983 and 1986, the Forest Service and FOB joined forces to build three new bathhouses at Bagby.

A conflict among the leadership of FOB led to a rift within the group in the late 1990s, and the Forest Service terminated its contract with the group in summer 2001. In 2011/2012 Bagby was handed over to a concessionaire to operate, leading to a $5-per-person soaking fee. The hot springs was closed during the COVID-19 pandemic in 2020; many facilities were vandalized or non-functional. In 2023, management of the springs was turned over to Bagby Preservation, run by a couple who met at Bagby and who have experience running hot springs resorts. The facilities re-opened in 2024.

== Hot springs ==
Three major springs and several minor outlets make up Bagby Hot Springs. The largest spring flows at 24 gallons (91 L) per minute at 138 °F (59 °C). The two secondary springs produce 15 gallons (57 L) per minute at 136 °F (58 °C) and 3 gallons (11 L) per minute at 120 °F (49 °C). Water from the Bagby springs is rich in minerals, with analysis revealing the following chemicals: silica 80 parts per million (PPM), sodium 51 PPM, sulfate 45 PPM, carbonate 36 PPM, chloride 13 PPM, calcium 3.4 PPM, hydroxide 1 PPM, potassium 1 PPM, fluoride 0.8 PPM, magnesium 0.1 PPM, arsenic 0.01 PPM, lithium 0.026 PPM, strontium 0.014 PPM, and nickel 0.004 PPM.

=== Facilities ===
There is a $5/person fee to soak. Visitors buy a bracelet with cash in the parking lot or pay with cash or credit/debit card in the store at the Ripplebrook Ranger Station. Camping is not permitted at the hot springs or along the trail to Bagby. Alcohol is prohibited at the site. Nudity is allowed only in the bath houses, not along the trail or other open areas. Local law enforcement officers periodically visit Bagby to ensure a positive atmosphere at the springs. The waiting time for a soaking tub varies depending on the number of people visiting the springs at a given time. Summer weekends and holidays can be quite busy.

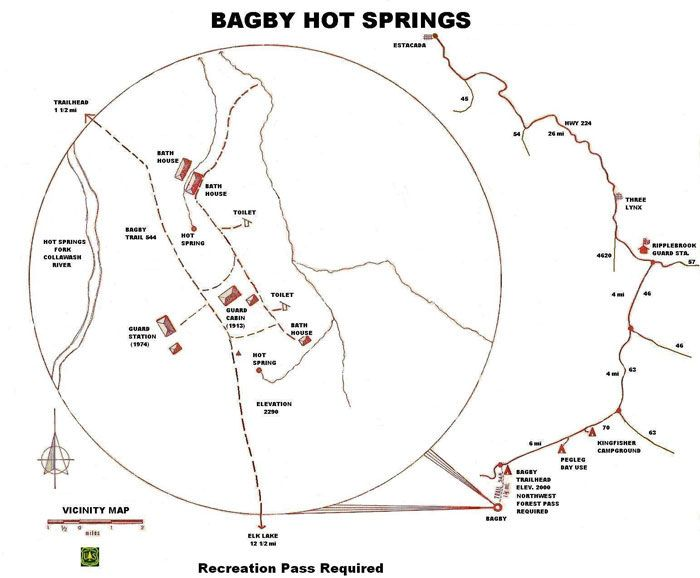
Travel route from Estacada to Bagby Hot Springs and Bagby site map

There are three bath houses at the site. The main bathhouse had five cedar log tubs each in a private room. However, this house is closed for safety reasons and is planned to be demolished and replaced. The lower bathhouse has three small two-person Japanese-style yellow pine soaking tubs and a large round tub on an open deck. The upper bathhouse is about 100 yards (91 m) from the other two. It has one large round tub on an open deck.

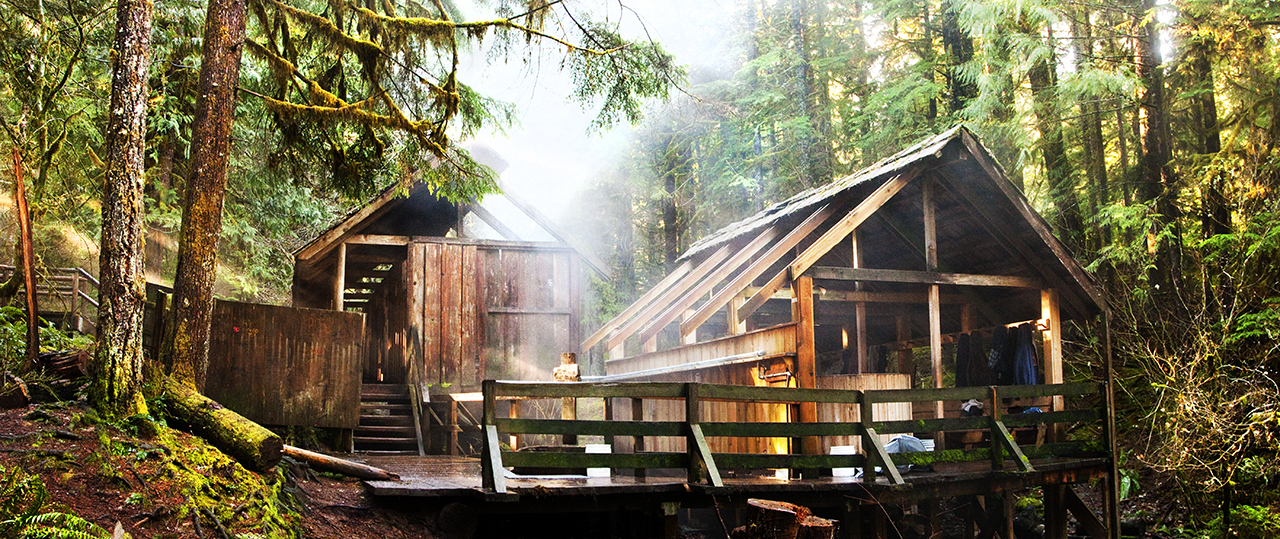
The two large bathing decks at Bagby Hot Springs.

== Access ==
There is no road to Bagby Hot Springs, so visitors must hike a 1.5-mile (2.4 km) trail from a Forest Service parking area. It is a relatively easy hike, with only a 200 feet (60 m) gain in elevation. The trail is maintained by the Forest Service and volunteers from the Northwest Forest Conservancy.

== See also ==
- Breitenbush Hot Springs, hot springs and resort not far from Bagby
- Old Joy, a 2006 road movie, wherein the final destination is Bagby Hot Springs
- List of hot springs in the United States
