= Arleta Branch Library =

Historic library building in Portland, Oregon, U.S.

- U.S. National Register of Historic Places
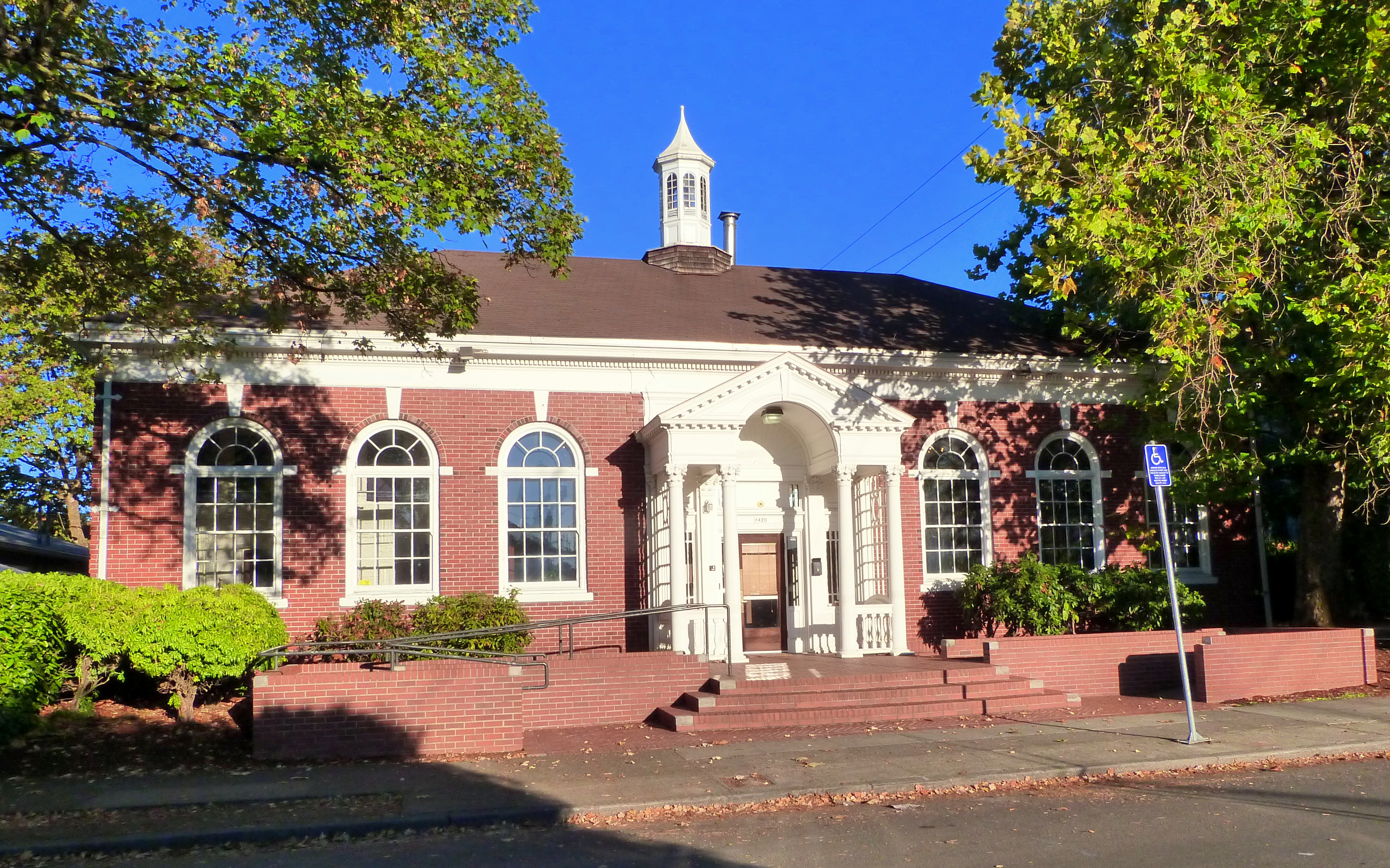
- The building's exterior in 2015

- Location within Portland, Oregon Location within Oregon Location within the United States
- Location: 4420 SE 64th Avenue; Portland, Oregon
- Coordinates: 45°29′26″N 122°35′49″W
- NRHP reference No.: 16000088
- Added to NRHP: March 15, 2016

The Arleta Branch Library, also known as the Arleta Carnegie Library and the Wikman Building, is a Carnegie library building in Portland, Oregon's Foster-Powell neighborhood, in the United States.

== History ==
The library building was designed by Folger Johnson and built in 1918 with funds provided by the Carnegie Corporation. In 2016, the building was listed on the National Register of Historic Places.

== See also ==
- List of Carnegie libraries in Oregon
- National Register of Historic Places listings in Southeast Portland, Oregon
