= McLoughlin Promenade =

- U.S. National Register of Historic Places
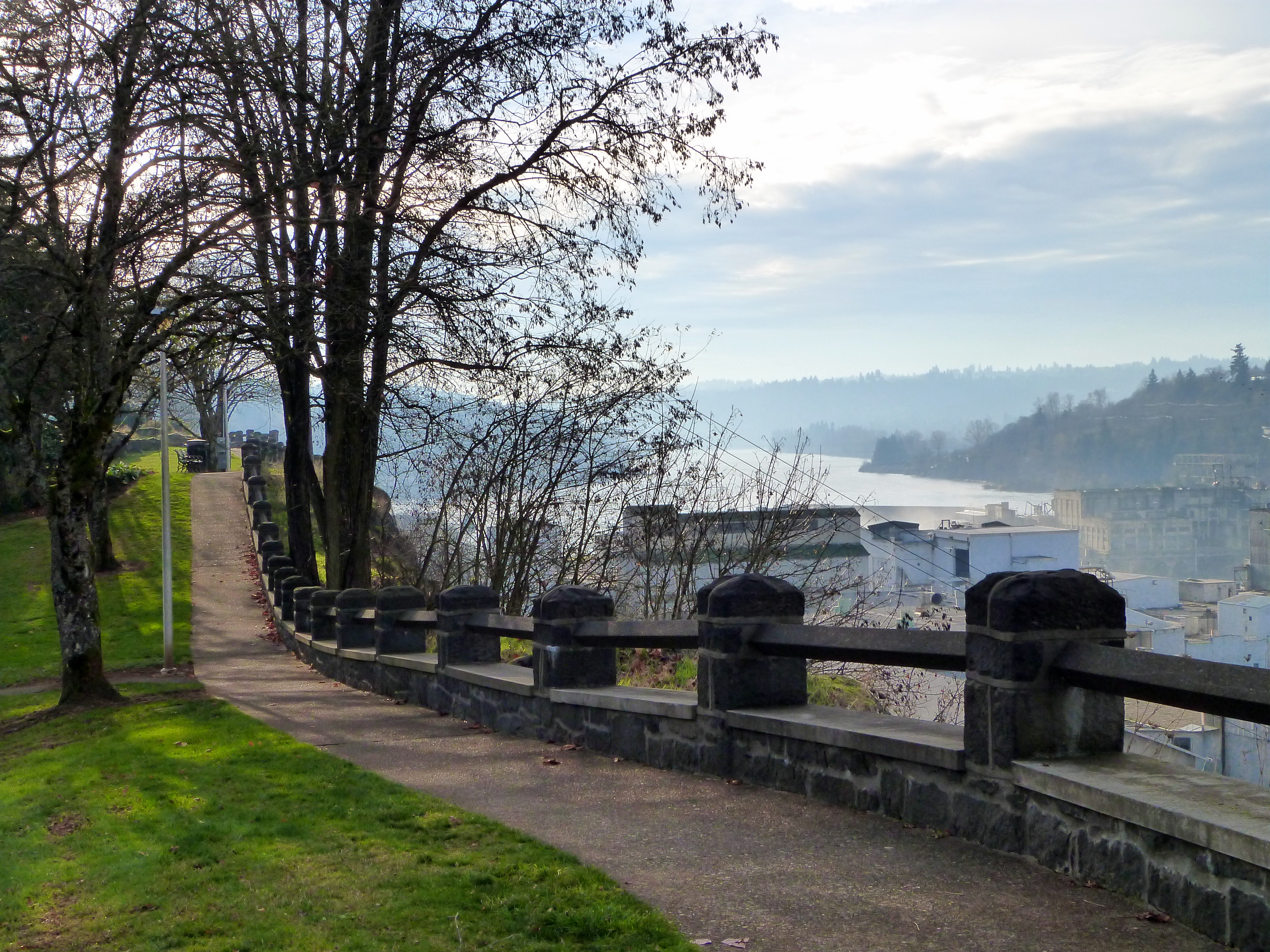
- McLoughlin Promenade

- Location within Oregon Location within the United States
- Location: Oregon City, Oregon
- Coordinates: 45.354856°N 122.610209°W
- Area: Linear 7.8 acres (3.2 ha)
- Built: 1936–1939
- Architect: John L. Franzen; Works Progress Administration; Oregon State Emergency Relief Agency
- NRHP reference No.: 14000179
- Added to NRHP: May 15, 2014

The McLoughlin Promenade is a scenic pathway located on Singer Hill Bluff, on the southeast bank of the Willamette River overlooking Oregon City in the U.S. state of Oregon. It was constructed 1936–1939 on land once inhabited by the Molala and other indigenous peoples. Named after Oregon pioneer John McLoughlin who donated his personal real estate for the purpose of a city promenade, the design and implementation of it was part of a joint public works effort between Oregon and the United States government. The pathway courses 100 feet (30 m) above Oregon City and features the Grand Staircase and the man-made Singer Creek Falls. Lighting was added by the local Kiwanis club in 1972, and the Lee Kelly Moontrap bas-relief addition at the bottom of the falls was sponsored by the Rotary Club in 2011.

== John McLoughlin ==
The space between the edge of the bluff and blocks numbered thirty-three (33), etc., is donated for a promenade for the inhabitants of Oregon City.

— John McLoughlin, map of Oregon City filed in 1851

Canadian citizen John McLoughlin was empowered in 1824 to act as Chief Factor of the Columbia District for the Hudson's Bay Company in the Oregon Country, a region that was jointly occupied by the British, Canadians and Americans. Recognized by the 1957 Oregon Legislative Assembly as "the father of Oregon", McLoughlin built Fort Vancouver and was instrumental in boosting both the lumber industry and the fur trading economy. The state of Oregon estimates that he established approximately 20 trading posts.

According to the National Park Service, Singer Hill Bluff had been inhabited by various Native American tribes, predominately the Molala (or Molalla) people, several thousand years before the arrival of the settlers of European ancestry. McLoughlin platted the town of Oregon City on and below the bluff in 1842. After the United States and Great Britain signed the 1846 Oregon Treaty establishing the US-Canadian boundary at the 49th parallel, he resigned from the Hudson's Bay Company and retired to Oregon City. McLoughlin became a United States citizen and mayor of the city in 1851, donating a strip of his personal land on Singer Hill Bluff to be used as a city promenade. He died in 1857.

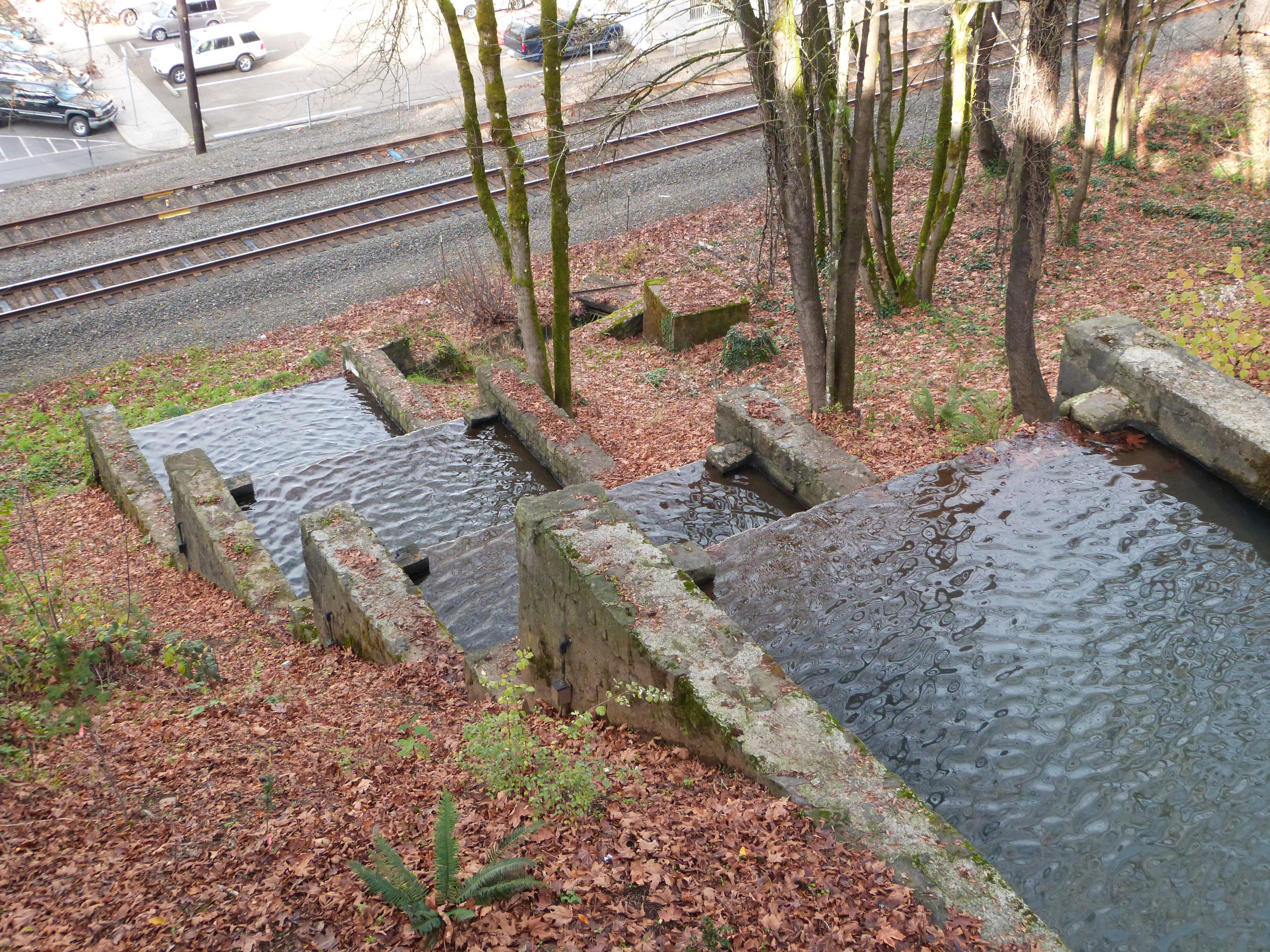
Singer Creek Falls

== Construction and maintenance ==
The linear 7.8-acre (3.2 ha) McLoughlin Promenade is composed of the natural features on Singer Hill Bluff, and the man-made structures created by the Works Progress Administration (WPA) 1936–1939. Oregon's State Emergency Relief Agency (SERA) was purposed to provide assistance for the unemployed, and the WPA was a government jobs creation program during the administration of President Franklin D. Roosevelt, that included historic preservation, programs in the arts, and building or improving infrastructure such as parks. The promenade project was proposed by SERA as a joint venture between the two.

City Manager John L. Franzen, a civil engineer educated at Washington State University, oversaw the implementation of the WPA projects within the city. He was the designer of the promenade. The predominant feature of the promenade is a scenic 10-foot (3 m) wide and 2,300-foot (701 m) long pedestrian pathway paved with stone and concrete. Approximately 100 feet (30 m) above Oregon City, it courses the 7.8-acre (3.2 ha) Singer Hill Bluff strip between Tumwater Drive on the south end, and the Oregon City Municipal Elevator on the north end. The side of the pathway that overlooks the city features 1,400 linear feet of basalt barrier walls and posts of varying heights.

The north end of the pathway adjoins the Grand Staircase, which was constructed along Singer Hill Trail, a route used by these indigenous peoples as they traveled to and from the Willamette River. One flight down, the staircase veers two opposing directions. The east leg turns towards an illuminated pedestrian underpass, after which that direction of the staircase rises two flights to the McLoughlin House historic site. On the west side of this juncture, Singer Creek is channeled through the staircase to the man-made Singer Creek Falls designed by Franzen. The water flows over 20-foot (6 m) wide concrete slabs, down the bluff towards the river. The west leg of the staircase leads towards city sidewalks and the municipal elevator.

When a new elevator was installed and moved slightly in 1955, the Grand Staircase was reconfigured accordingly. Oregon City's Kiwanis club performed maintenance on the promenade in 1969 clearing overgrowth, and they installed lighting in 1972. It underwent restoration of stone and concrete between 2004 and 2010.

== NRHP and miscellaneous information ==
The promenade's designer J. L. Franzen served as Oregon City's manager for two decades before being hired as Salem City Manager, a post he held until his retirement nine and a half years later.

In 2011, the local Rotary Club celebrated its own 75th anniversary in Oregon City by commissioning Oregon sculptor Lee Kelly to create the Moontrap bas-relief at the base of Singer Creek Falls.

McLoughlin Promenade was added to the National Register of Historic Places on May 15, 2014.

== Gallery ==
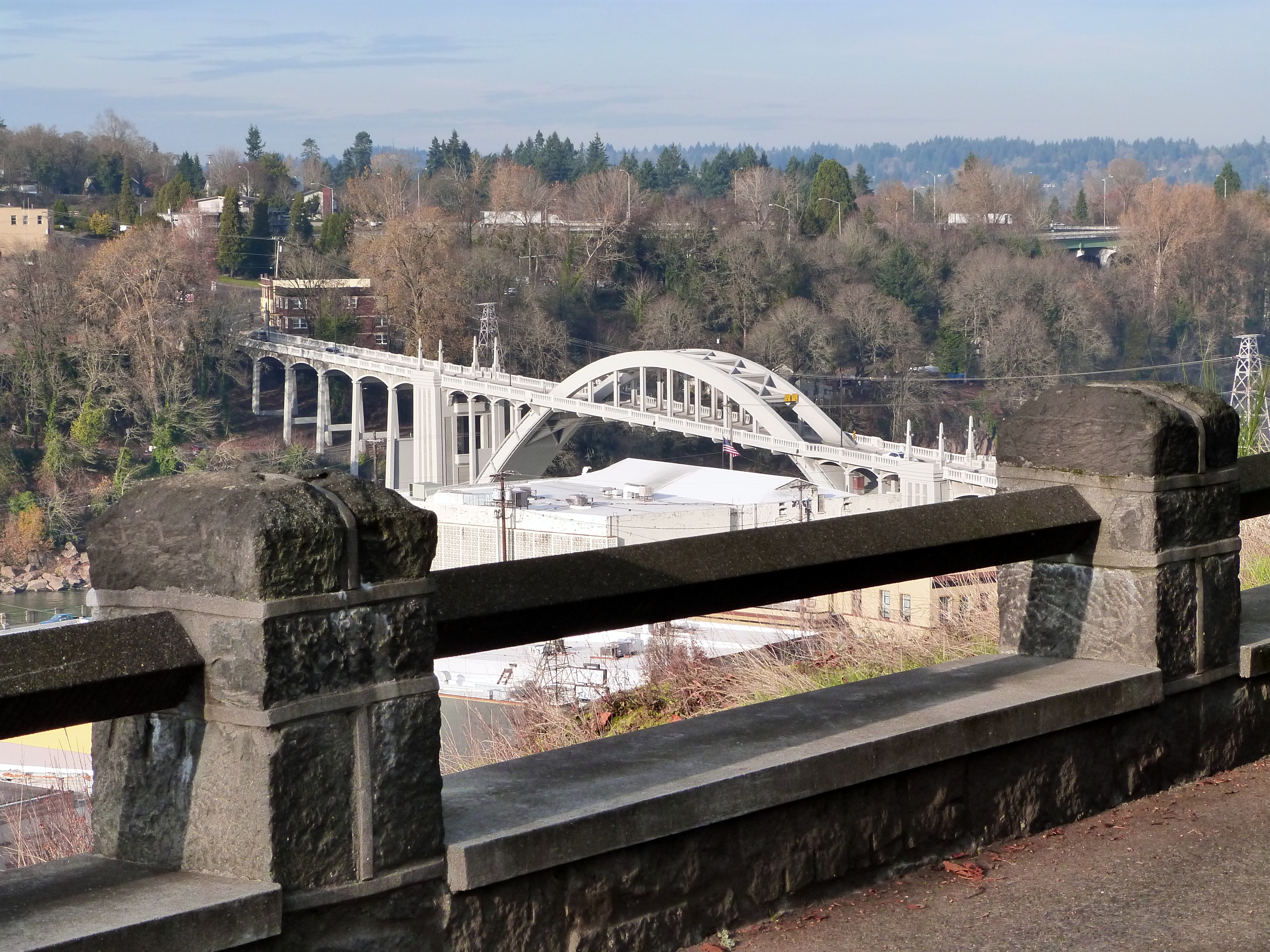
Overlooking the Oregon City Bridge

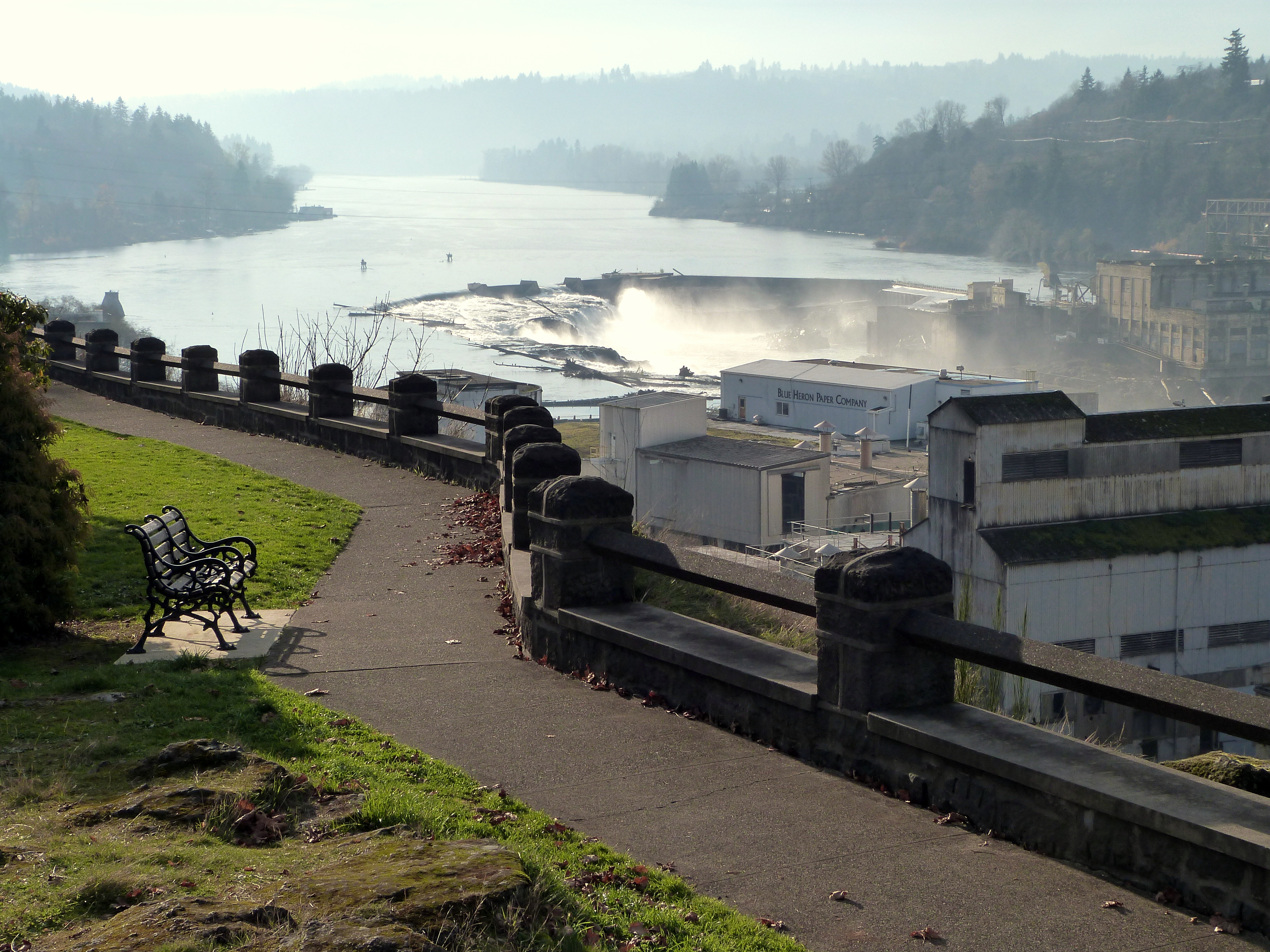
Overlooking Willamette Falls

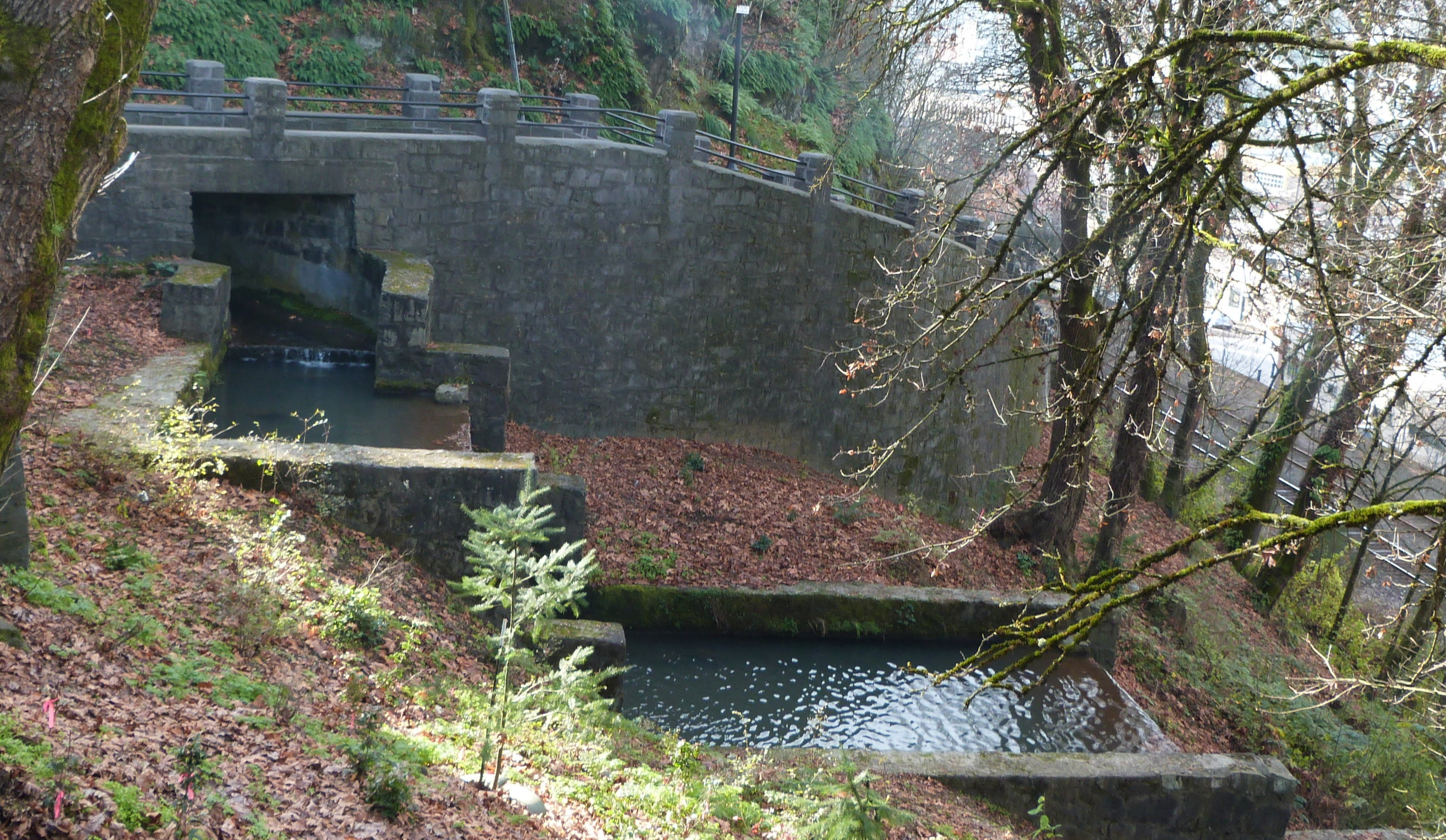
Grand Staircase and Singer Creek Falls

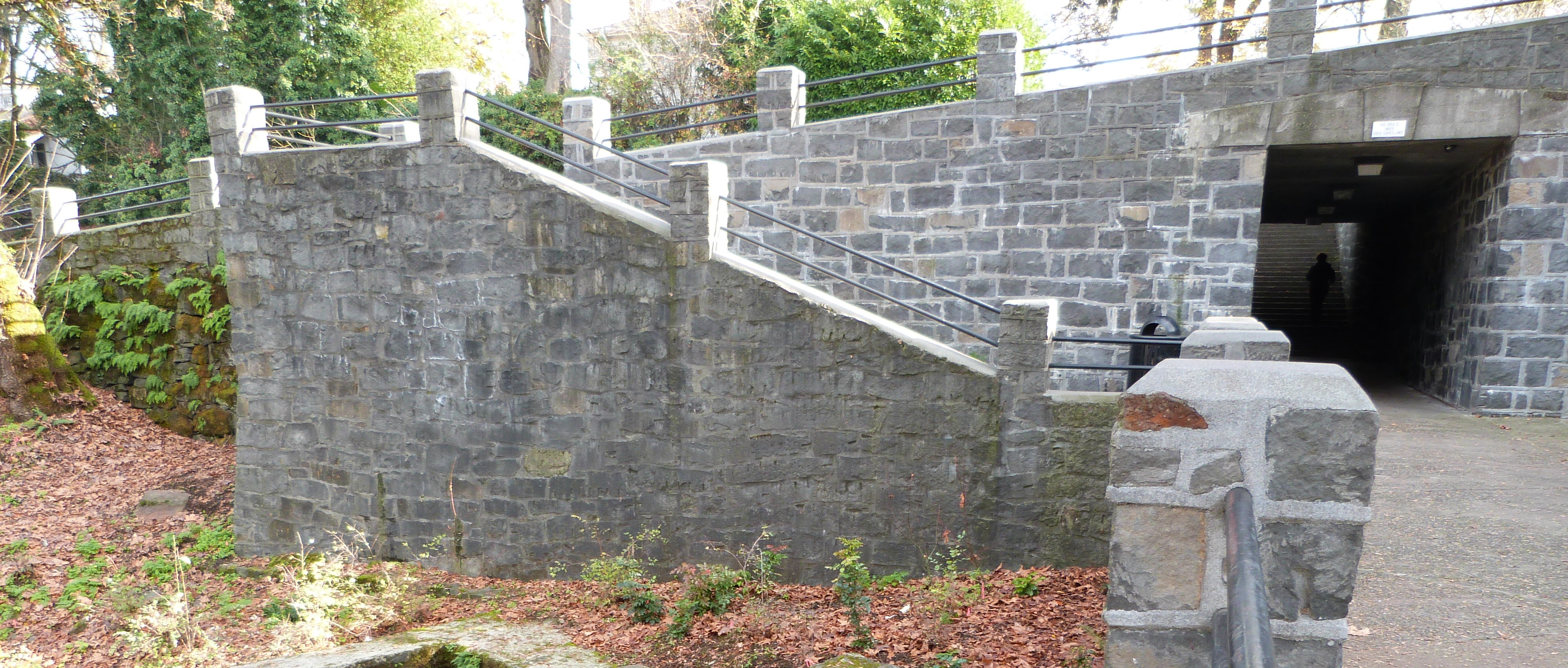
Singer Hill Road underpass
