= Harvey Cross House =

Historic house in Oregon, United States

- U.S. National Register of Historic Places
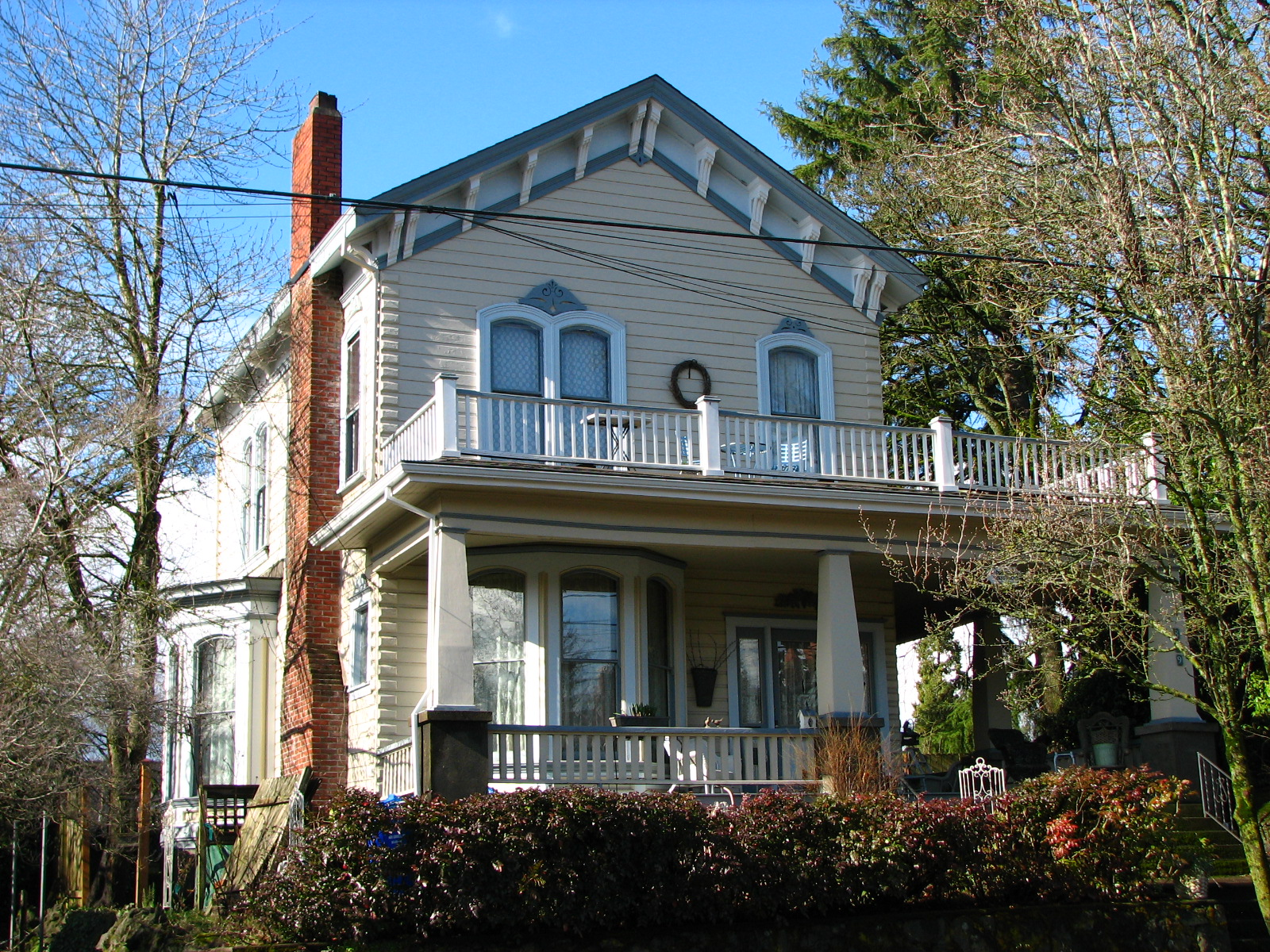
- The Cross House in 2009

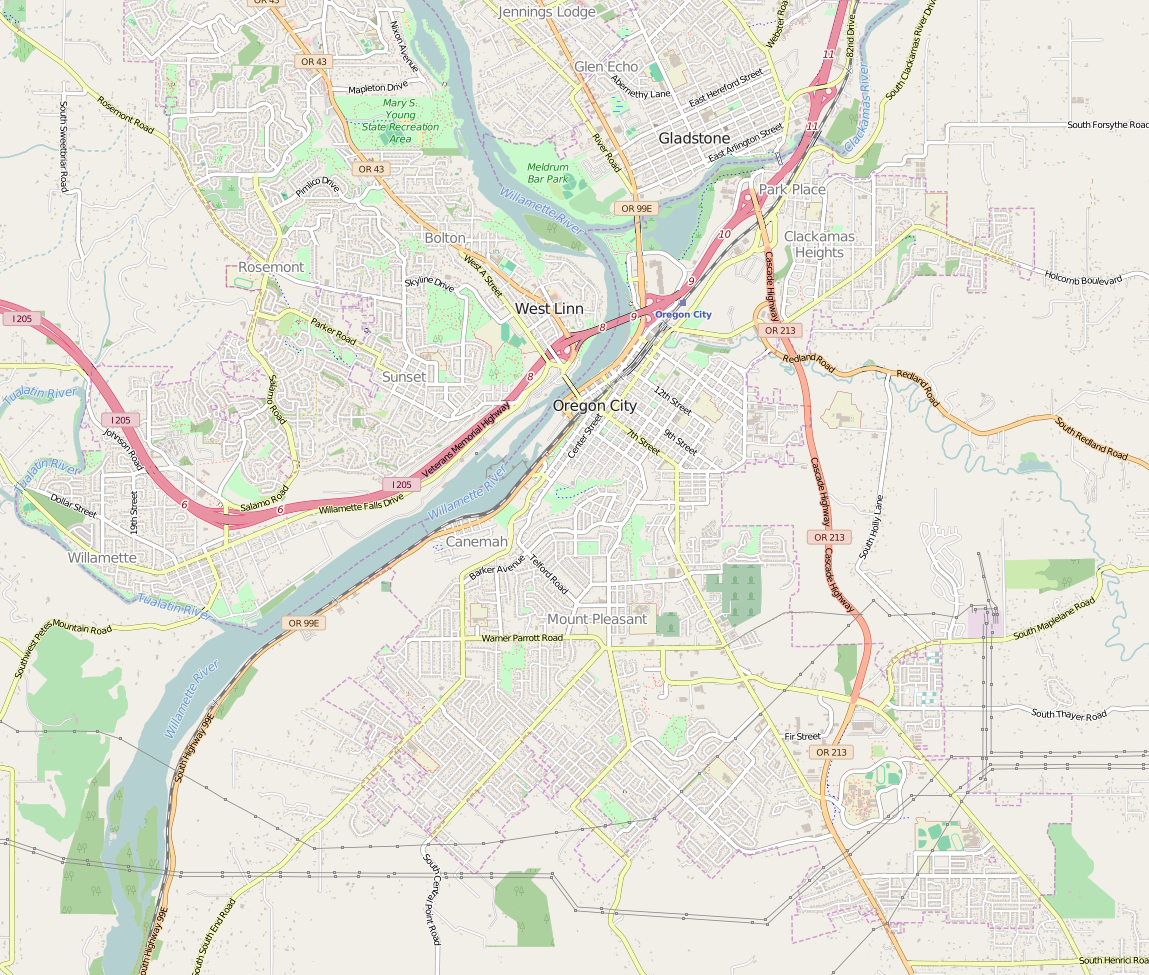
- Location within Oregon City OR Location within Oregon Location within the United States
- Location: 809 Washington Street, Oregon City, Oregon
- Coordinates: 45°21′27″N 122°36′15″W
- Area: Approx. 6,930 sq ft (644 m^{2})
- Built: c. 1885–1890, relocated c. 1915
- Architectural style: Italianate
- NRHP reference No.: 79002043
- Added to NRHP: October 30, 1979

The Harvey Cross House is a historic residence in Oregon City, Oregon, United States. It was built c. 1885–1890, then relocated within Oregon City c. 1915, and is one of the finest, most stately examples of Italianate residential architecture in the city. The house was built for Harvey Cross, an investor in the Barlow Road and founder, with partners, founded the Gladstone Real Estate Association, which eventually led to the establishment of the city of Gladstone, Oregon. He served as a county judge and state senator, and promoted Chautauqua in the Willamette Valley.

The house was listed on the National Register of Historic Places in 1979.

== See also ==
- National Register of Historic Places listings in Clackamas County, Oregon
