= Richard B. Petzold Building =

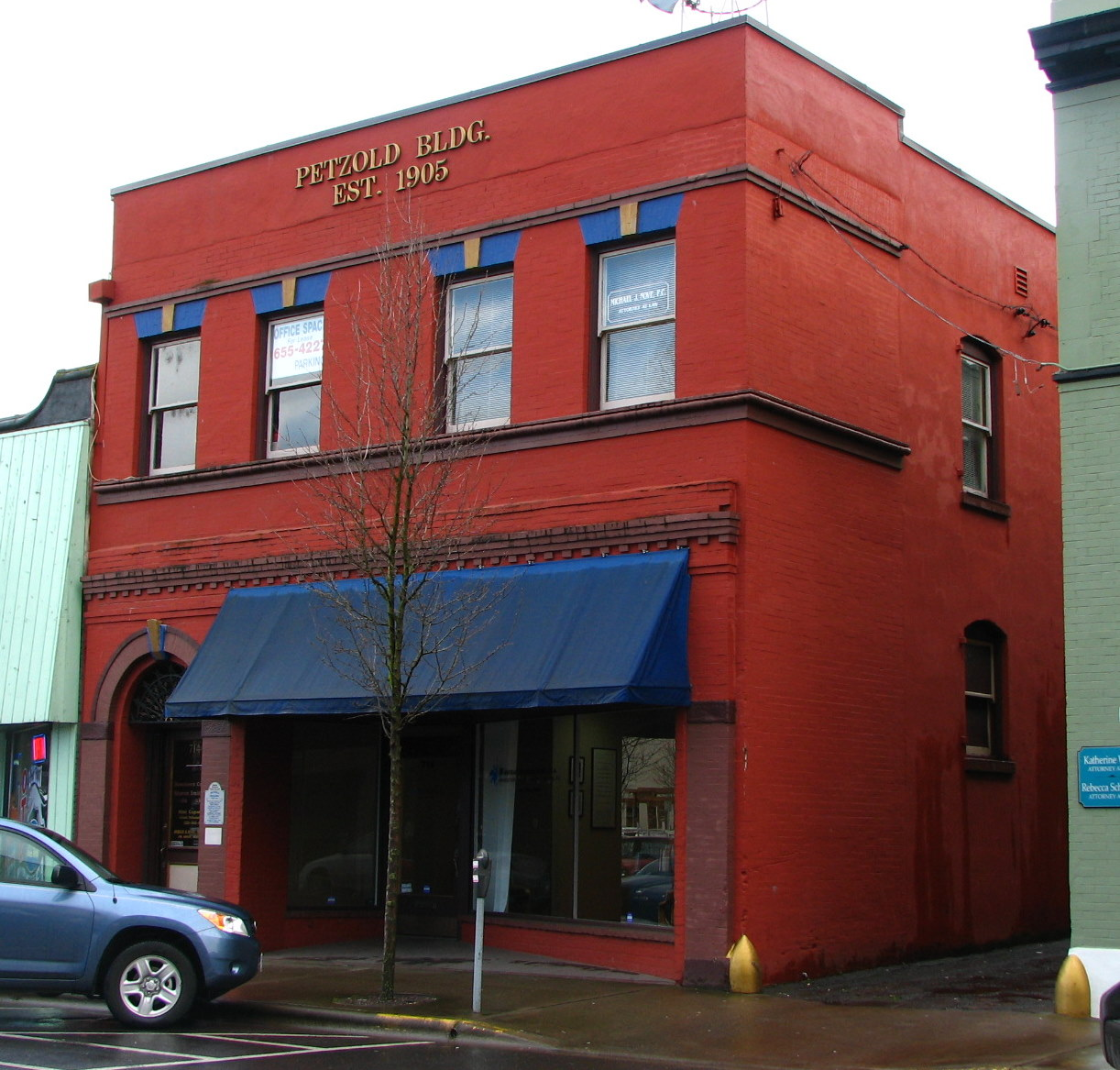
- The building's exterior in 2009
- Interactive map of the Richard B. Petzold Building area

General information
- Location: Oregon City, Oregon, United States
- Coordinates: 45.358°N 122.60776°W

The Richard B. Petzold Building, also known as the Noble Building, is an historic building in Oregon City, Oregon, United States. It was completed c. 1905, and has been listed on the National Register of Historic Places.

== See also ==
- National Register of Historic Places listings in Clackamas County, Oregon
