= Oregon City Carnegie Library =

Library and historic library building in Oregon City, Oregon, USA

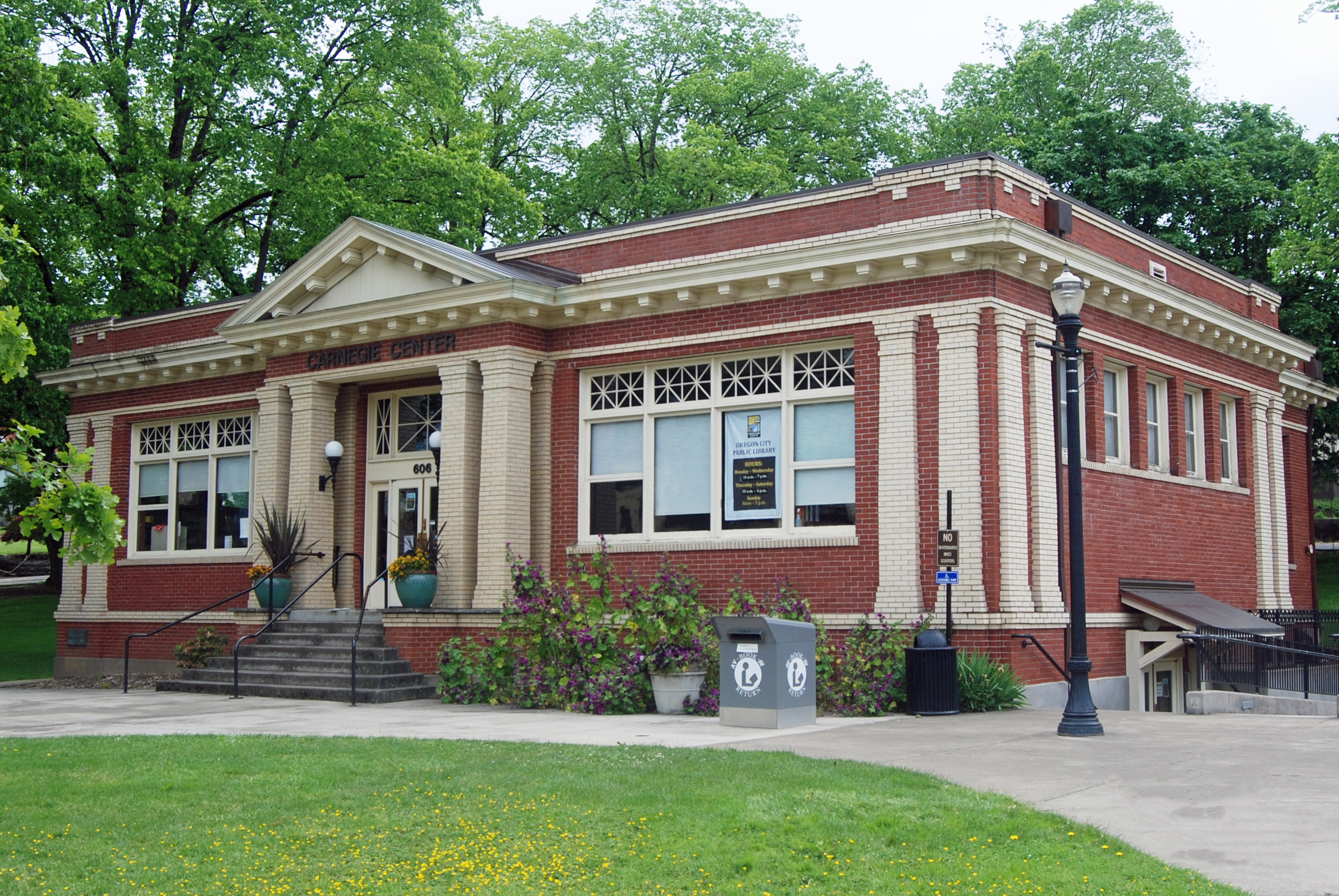
- The library building's front exterior in 2012
- 45.355345°N 122.604155°W
- Location: Oregon City, Oregon, United States
- Type: Library
- Established: 1913

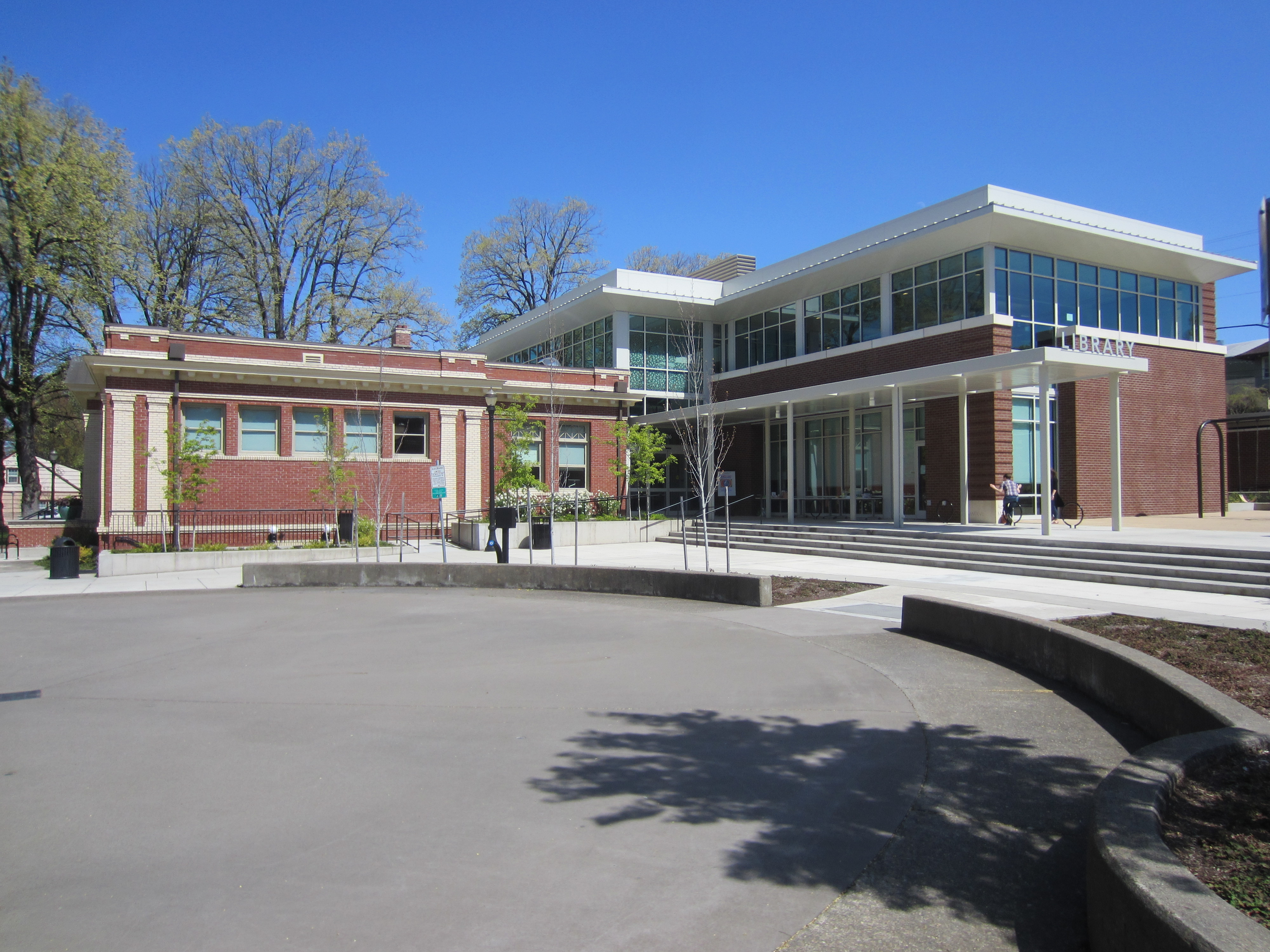
Exterior view, 2018

The Oregon City Carnegie Library is an historic library building located in Oregon City, Oregon, United States. It was added to the National Register of Historic Places in 2014. The building was completed in 1913 and underwent a major renovation and expansion in 2015.

== See also ==
- List of Carnegie libraries in Oregon
- National Register of Historic Places listings in Clackamas County, Oregon
