= John and Elizabeth Kinsman House =

Historic house in Oregon, United States

- U.S. National Register of Historic Places
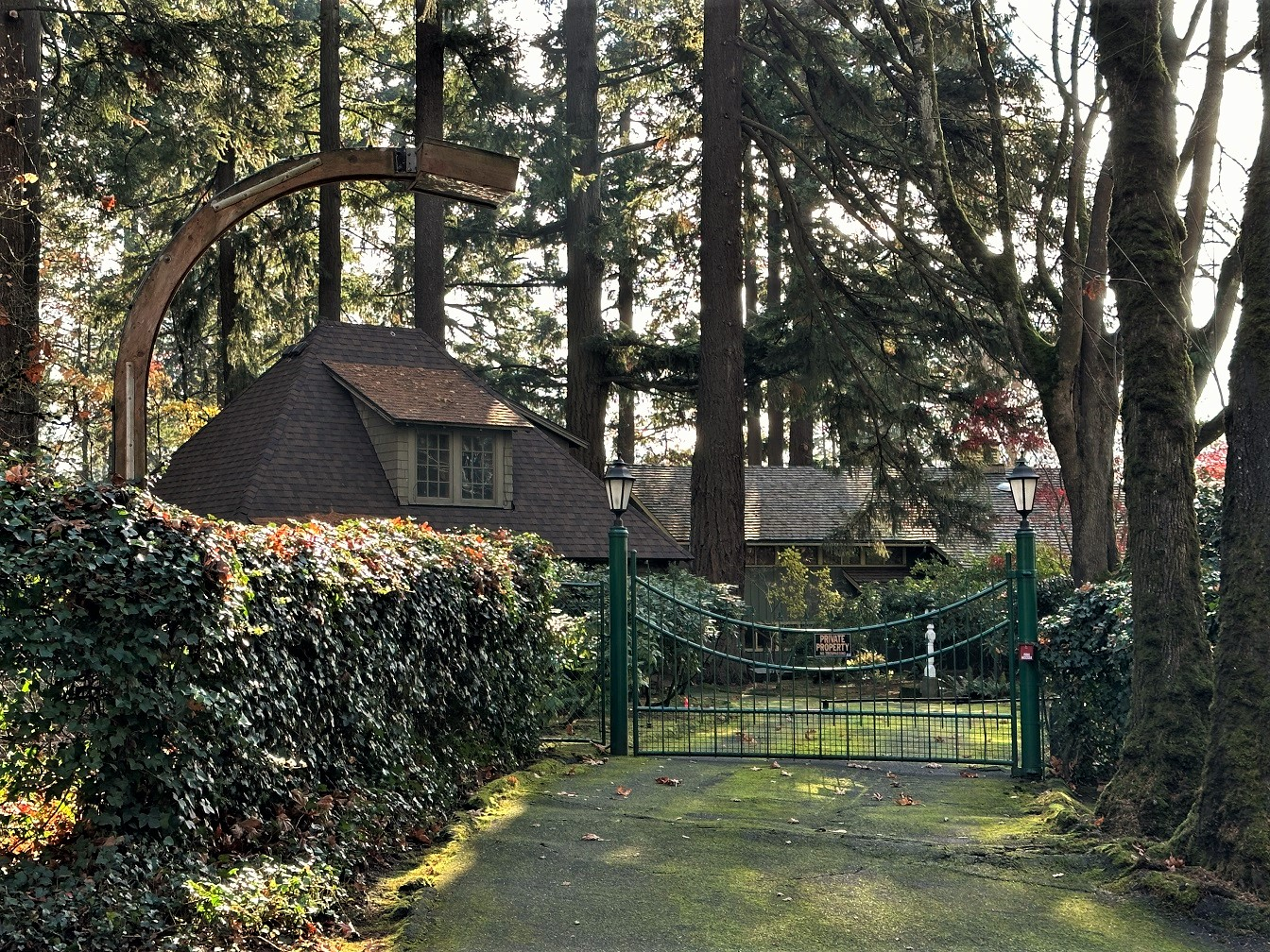

- Location within the United States Location within Oregon
- Location: 17014 SE Oatfield Road; Milwaukie, Oregon
- Coordinates: 45°24′01″N 122°36′18″W
- Area: 2.4 acres (0.97 ha)
- Built: 1963–1964
- Built by: John Kinsman
- Architect: John Kinsman
- Architectural style: Modern, 1950s/60s Contemporary
- NRHP reference No.: 100006185
- Added to NRHP: February 22, 2021

The John and Elizabeth Kinsman House is a historic house near Milwaukie, Oregon, United States. Completed in 1964, it is a locally significant and almost unaltered example of the Contemporary Style of the late 1950s and early 1960s, which emphasized local materials and indoor-outdoor living and rejected continuity with earlier stylistic conventions. The house is set in landscaped grounds that are also unaltered from the historic period. Designer/builder John Kinsman built the house for himself and his wife Elizabeth using design elements characteristic of the mid-century period that he had also employed on his other projects.

The house was entered on the National Register of Historic Places in 2021.

== See also ==
- National Register of Historic Places listings in Clackamas County, Oregon
- Mid-century modern
