= Bell Station Store =

Coordinates: 45.4558°N 122.5926°W

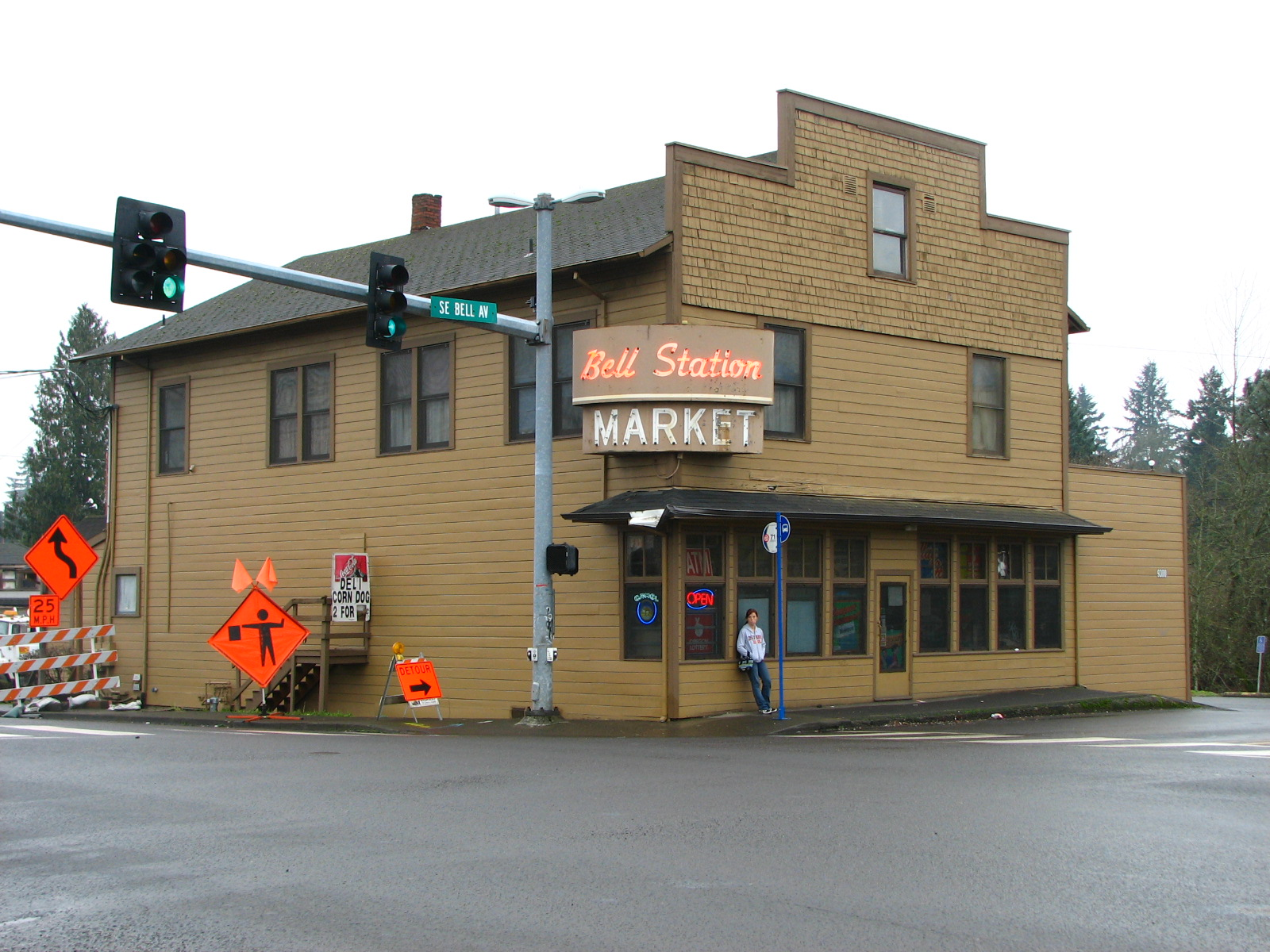
The building's exterior, 2009

The Bell Station Store is a historic building in Clackamas County, Oregon, United States. It is listed on the National Register of Historic Places.

== See also ==
- National Register of Historic Places listings in Clackamas County, Oregon
