= Moontrap (Kelly) =

moontrap
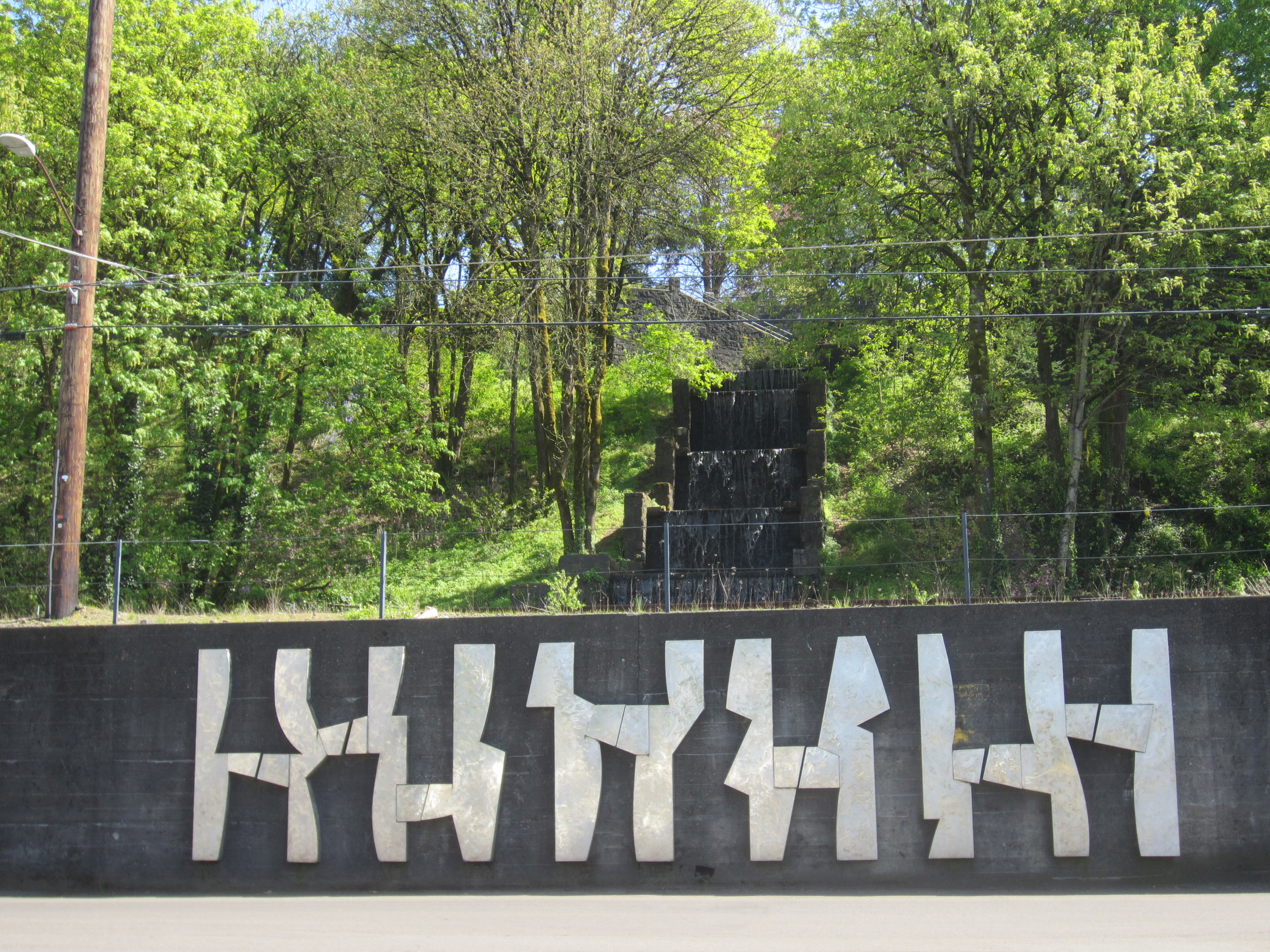
- The sculpture in 2018
- Artist: Lee Kelly
- Year: 2011
- Movement: Stainless steel sculpture
- Location: Oregon City, Oregon, United States
- 45.357751°N 122.606839°W

Moontrap (stylized as moontrap) is an outdoor sculpture by Lee Kelly, installed at the base of Oregon City, Oregon's Singer Creek Falls, along the McLoughlin Promenade, in the United States. The abstract stainless steel sculpture was unveiled in November 2011.

== See also ==
- 2011 in art
- List of works by Lee Kelly
