= James Milne House =

Historic house in Oregon, United States

- U.S. National Register of Historic Places
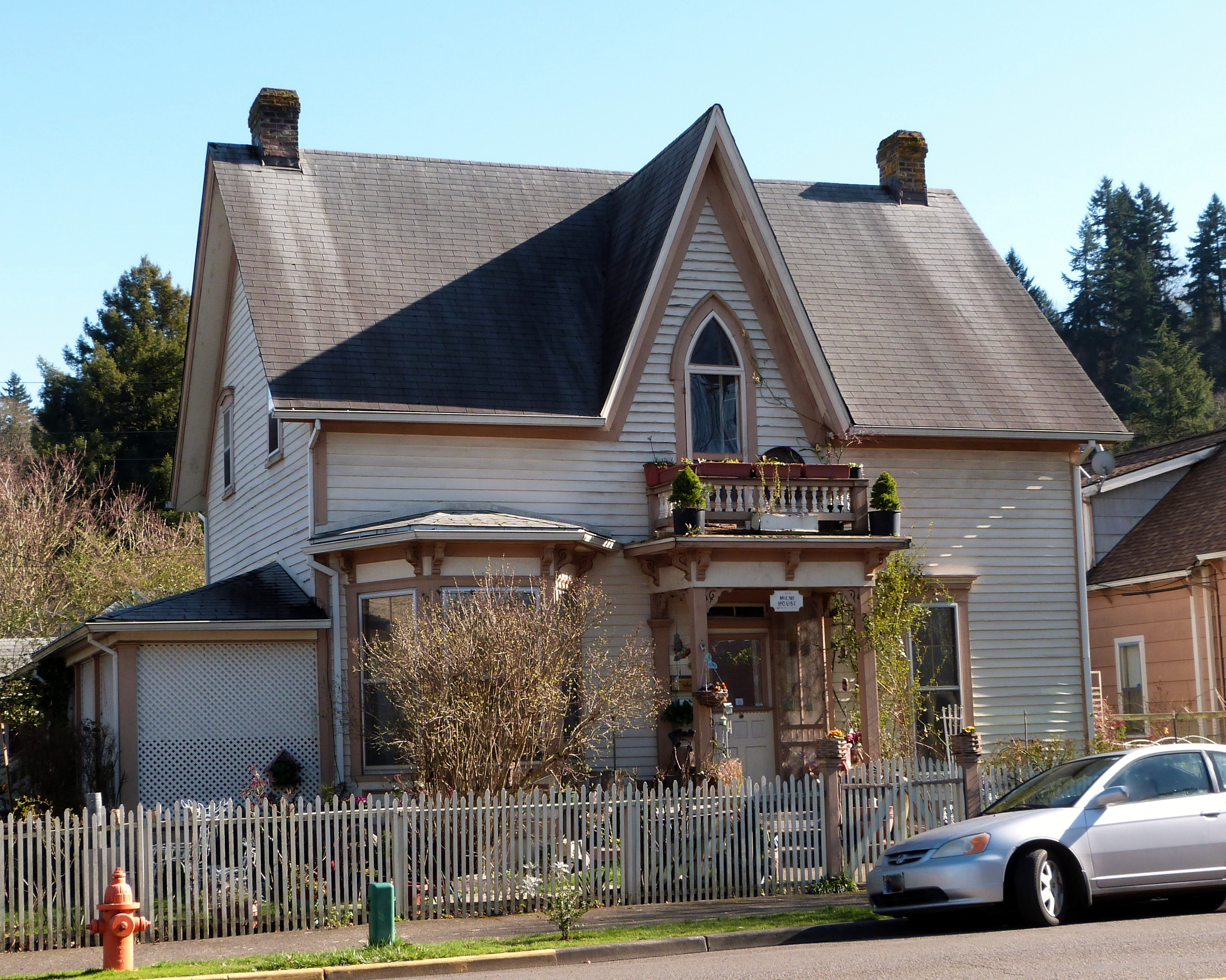

- Location within Oregon Location within the United States
- Location: 224 Center Street; Oregon City, Oregon, U.S.
- Coordinates: 45°21′12″N 122°36′34″W
- Built: 1869
- Architect: James Milne
- Architectural style: Gothic Revival
- NRHP reference No.: 80003304
- Added to NRHP: March 12, 1979

The James Milne House is an historic Gothic Revival home built by carpenter James Milne, in what is now the Historic McGloughlin Neighborhood in Oregon City, Oregon, United States. It is listed on the National Register of Historic Places. Milne, an immigrant from New Brunswick, Canada, designed and built the home in 1869.
