= Pendleton Center for the Arts =

- Umatilla County Library
- U.S. National Register of Historic Places
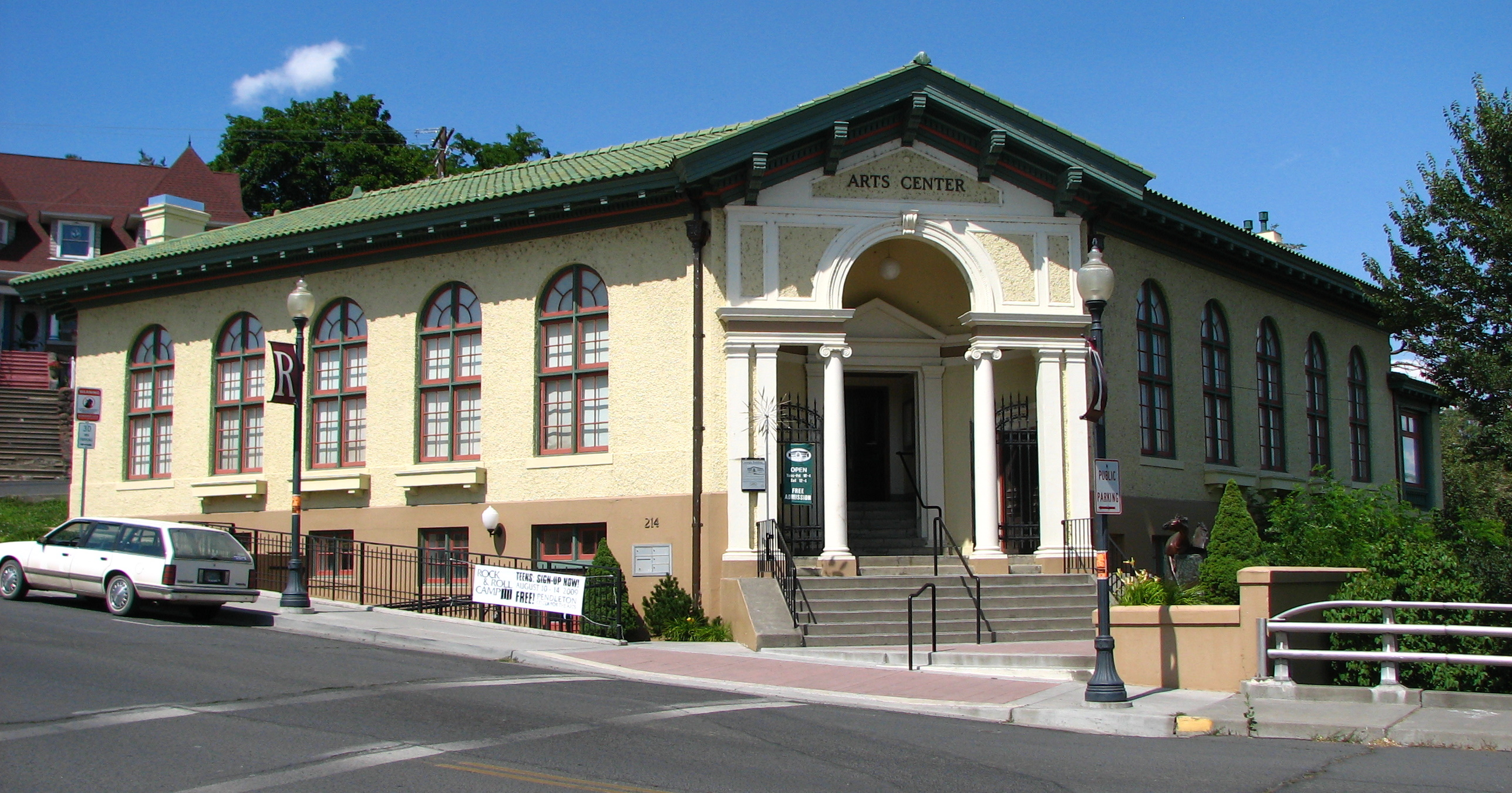
- The library / arts center in 2009

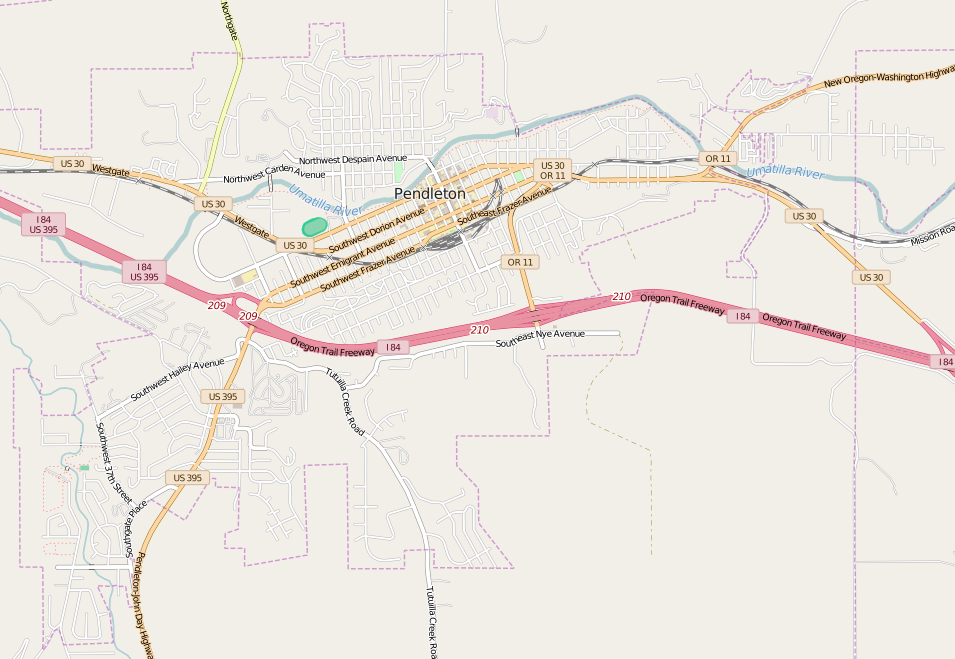
- Location within Pendleton OR Location within Oregon Location within the United States
- Location: 214 N. Main Street; Pendleton, Oregon
- Coordinates: 45°40′28″N 118°47′19″W
- Built: 1916
- Architect: Johnson, Folger; Hatch, Raymond
- Architectural style: Italian Renaissance Revival
- NRHP reference No.: 97000848
- Added to NRHP: August 15, 1997

The Pendleton Center for the Arts is an arts center located in the historic former Umatilla County Library building, also known as Pendleton Public Library in Pendleton, Oregon, United States.

== Building ==
The center is located in Pendleton's 1915 Carnegie library building near the Umatilla River. The Italian Renaissance Revival-style building was one of the thousands funded by steel tycoon Andrew Carnegie in the early 1900s. The library served as the Umatilla County Library, then as the Pendleton Public Library, until 1996 and was listed on the National Register of Historic Places in 1997.

After serving for more than 80 years as a library and community gathering place, the building was renovated by the Arts Council of Pendleton into a multi-venue arts facility.

== Galleries and facilities ==
The 1,800-square-foot (170 m^{2}) East Oregonian Gallery provides a venue for professional and emerging artists from the region and also presents a wide range of art from across the country and around the world through traveling exhibitions and special events.

The Lorenzen Board Room Gallery features exhibits by local community members, often sharing their work for the first time.

The 110-seat Pearson Auditorium provides a venue for live music performances.

The Pendleton Foundation Trust Fine Craft Gallery features work by more than 50 artisans from the Pacific Northwest, showcasing their newest work and many one-of-a-kind offerings.

The center makes its rooms available to the public for rental.

== Studios and classes ==
Teen class

The center has painting, ceramics and digital arts studios, where community members can take a class or work independently in a wide range of media. A full slate of music classes are available as well.

The center's Art Rocks Teens (A.R.T.) program offers free after-school and summer classes to 13- to 18-year-olds. Designed by the teens themselves, the classes cover a wide range of visual and performing arts, including garage band, film making, costume, and jewelry design.

Other free classes include "Free for All", a free 30 minute class for youngsters under age 10 years each Saturday at 10 am, and "Hip & Handmade", a free one-hour class for adults each Saturday at 11:00 am. Both classes are drop-in format, no pre-registration is required.

== See also ==
- National Register of Historic Places listings in Umatilla County, Oregon
