= Clackamas Lake Ranger Station Historic District =

Historic district in Oregon, United States

- Clackamas Lake Ranger Station
- U.S. National Register of Historic Places
- U.S. Historic district
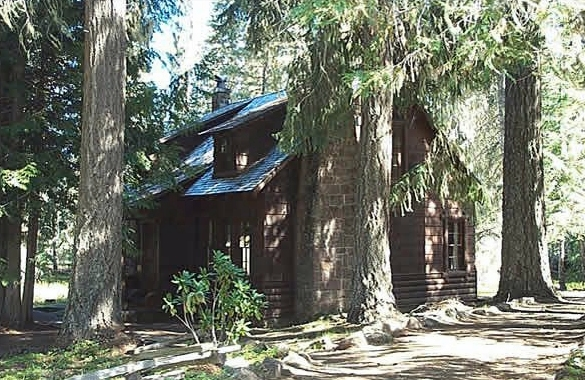
- Clackamas Lake Ranger Residence

- Location within Oregon Location within the United States
- Location: Mount Hood National Forest
- Nearest city: Sandy, Oregon, USA
- Coordinates: 45.09864°N 121.75079°W
- Built: 1933 -1935
- Architectural style: Simple rustic
- NRHP reference No.: 81000477
- Added to NRHP: 1981

The Clackamas Lake Ranger Station Historic District is a Forest Service compound consisting of eleven historic buildings located in the Mount Hood National Forest in the Cascade Mountains of northern Oregon. It was originally built as a district ranger station for the Clackamas Lake Ranger District. It was later converted to a summer guard station. Today, the Forest Service rents the historic ranger's residence to recreational visitors. The Clackamas Lake Ranger Station is listed as a historic district on the National Register of Historic Places.

== History ==
In the 1920s and 1930s, forest road networks were not well developed. To facilitate work in National Forests, the Forest Service built district ranger stations at strategic locations within the forest to house full-time employees and provide logistics support to fire patrols and project crews working at remote forest sites. After World War II, the Forest Service greatly expanded its road network, allowing employees to get to most forest areas within a few hours. As a result, many of the more isolated ranger stations were closed or converted to summer guard station.

The Forest Service began using the Clackamas Lake site in 1905. The original ranger cabin and barn were built by the district's first ranger, Joe Graham, in 1906. The compound was expanded during the 1930s by the Civilian Conservation Corps. All of the historic buildings that exist at the site today are from that era. The range station served as the summer administrative site for the Clackamas Lake Ranger District from 1906 until the 1952 when the compound was converted to a guard station for fire crews and work parties. After a short period of disuse in the 1960s, the guard station was reopened in the early 1970s. Since then, the site has remained in continuous use as a guard station, work center, recreation facility, and visitor center.

Because of the rustic architecture of the buildings and the site's unique historic value as an early Forest Service ranger station, the Clackamas Lake Ranger Station compound was listed as a historic district on the National Register of Historic Place in 1981. The historic area covers 4 acres (16,000 m^{2}).

== Historic structures ==
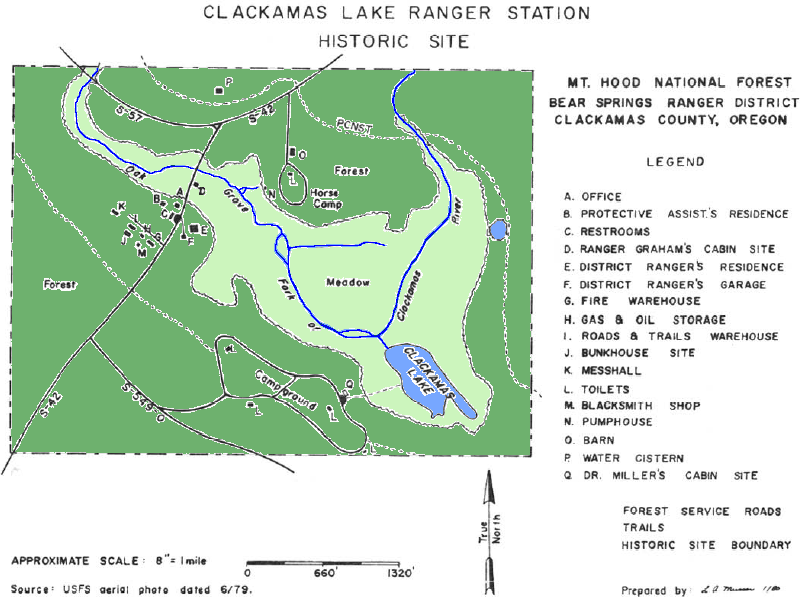
Clackamas Lake Ranger District Historic District area map

The ranger station is made up of eleven historic buildings and twelve other rustic, but non-historic, structures. In addition, the original ranger station landscaping still exists including picnic tables, a horseshoe pit, and stone fire pit. The historic district originally had twelfth historic building, but one ranger residence was destroyed by fire in 2003.

The ranger station's historic buildings include the district office, two ranger residences, a mess hall, a fire equipment warehouse, a separate road-and-trail warehouse, a gas station, garage, blacksmith shop, horse barn, and a pump house across the meadow. The district office is now a visitor center and museum. The ranger's residence is available to be rented. Volunteer caretakers live on site, and help maintain the historic buildings, staff the visitor center, and provide interpretive tours of the compound.

The ranger station buildings are wood and log-frame structures with concrete foundations. The exteriors are covered with wood shingles. Wooden shingles are also used for roofing. All the buildings are painted dark brown with dark brown trim so they blend into the surrounding forest landscape.

- The ranger station office was built in 1933. It is a one-story, wood-frame building with a concrete foundation. The high gable roof is covered with wood shingles. The stone chimney is slightly off-center from the roof ridgeline. The windows are four-over-four panes in a double-hung sash. The front entrance faces south and has a flagstone porch steps except for the final step, which is cut from a large peeled log. The office interior is divided into two rooms. The office walls are covered by painted wood panels, and the floors are varnished fir.
- The ranger's residence was built the in 1933. The residence plan was chosen by District Ranger Francis Williamson out of a group of Weyerhaeuser plans entitled Your Future Home. With the exception of exterior building materials, the residence was constructed to the plan's specifications. It is a 1 1/2-story, wood-frame building with a concrete foundation. It has a wood-shingled exterior and high gable roof. Windows are six-over-six panes in double-hung sashes with slab-wood frames giving the appearance of being notched and joined logs. There is a small front porch that protects the south-facing front entrance. The interior rooms of the ranger's residence have varnished fir-paneling with a large stone fireplace and built-in book cases in the living room. The residence has simple furnishings, including living room sofa, wooden chairs, kitchen and dining room tables, and beds for eight guests.
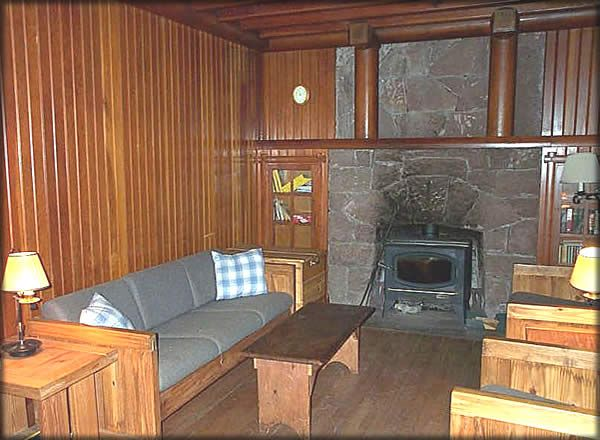
Ranger's living room

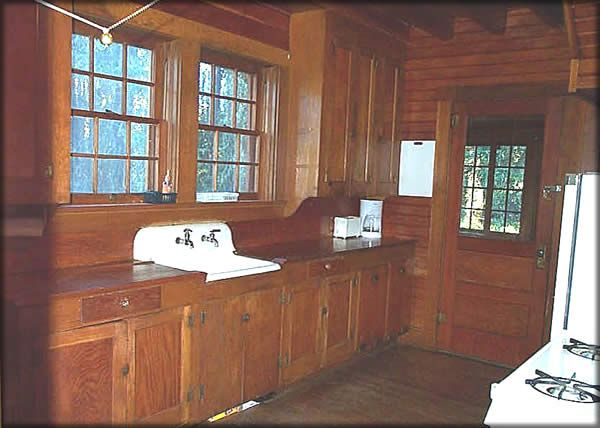
Kitchen area

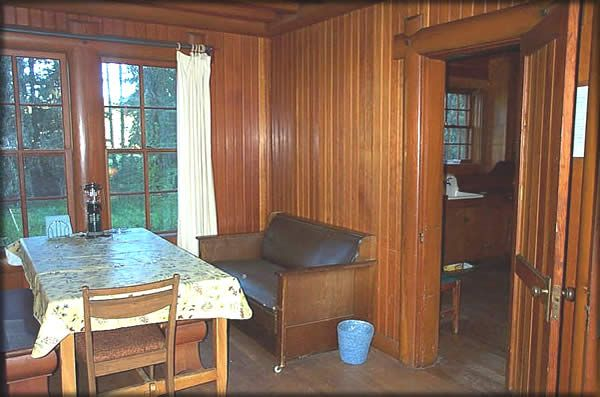
Dining room

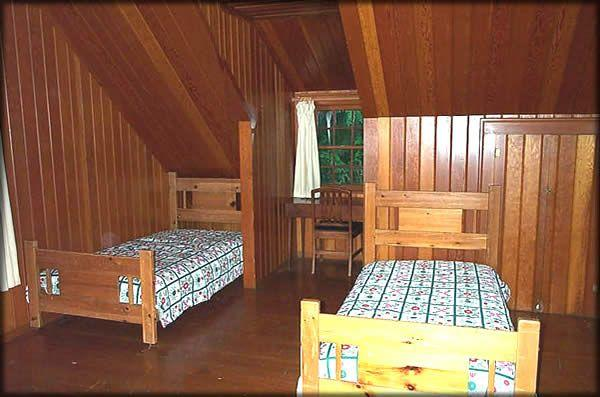
Upstairs bedroom
- The assistant ranger's residence was built in 1934. It is a one-story, wood-frame building with a concrete foundation. The structure is similar in style to the ranger's residence and office with a wood-shake exterior and high gable roof. There is a rustic stone chimney on the east end of the building. The front entrance faces north and is covered by a gable hood-type porch supported by peeled-pole brackets.
- The mess hall was built in 1934. It is a one-story, wood-frame structure with two entrances on the north side of the building. The exterior siding, foundation, and gabled roof are the same as the office and ranger residences.
- The fire warehouse was built between 1934 and 1935. It is a one-story, wood-frame structure with a concrete foundation covered with a rubble-stone veneer. The first four feet of the exterior walls were constructed with slab-wood. Above that level the exterior is covered with wooden shakes. The main entry is at the center of the north side of the building with a flagstone porch platform in front of a large wooden door.
- The road and trails warehouse was built in 1934. It is a simple one-story, wood-frame building with double entrance doors and large sliding doors on the north side
- The gas and oil storage building was built at the same time as the fire warehouse, and its design details match the warehouse. It is one-story, wood-frame structure. On the north side, the gable roof projects out over the gas pumps and vehicle service area. The main entrance is on the north side. There is also a loading dock on the east end of the building.
- A one-story, wood-frame garage next to the ranger's residence was built in 1933. It has a concrete foundation with rubble-stone veneer and high gable roof. The exterior walls are slab-wood on the lower level with wooden shakes above, similar to the fire warehouse exterior. The garage has large double doors on the north side, and accommodates one vehicle.
- The ranger station's blacksmith shop was built in 1934. It is a one-story, wood-frame structure. On three sides of the shop, the exterior has horizontal slab-wood boards on the lower level with wooden shakes covering the upper walls. On the south side the lower level is covered by horizontal wooden panels with wooden shakes above. The shop has double sliding doors in the centered of the north side and a normal entrance door on the south side.
- The ranger station's horse barn was probably built in 1935. The barn is a 1 1/2-story, wood-frame, structure. It has a high gable roof with wooden shingles and a wood-frame cupola on top. The exterior walls are covered by wood shingles.
- The pump house was built about the same time as the barn. Both building are located across the meadow from the other historic buildings. The pump house is small one-story, wood-frame building with a wood-shingle exterior and high gable roof.

There is also a Forest Service campground next to the historic Clackamas Lake Ranger Station. The campground has 46 camp sites, potable drinking water, and several modern restrooms. The ranger station and campground are only a short distance to Clackamas Lake, and just three miles (5 km) from the much larger and very popular Timothy Lake. Trails for hiking, horseback riding, or mountain biking can easily be reach from the compound.

== Location ==
The Clackamas Lake Ranger Station is located in the a remote area of the Mount Hood National Forest, fifty miles southeast of Sandy, Oregon and twenty-two miles south of Government Camp, Oregon. The elevation at the site is 3,400 feet (1,000 m). The forest around the guard station is dominated by old growth Douglas fir.

To get to the Clackamas Lake Ranger Station from Sandy, travel east on U.S. Route 26 for approximately 40 miles (64 km). Turn right onto Forest Road 42 (also known as Skyline Road) and travel south for 11 miles (18 km) past the intersection of Forest Roads 42 and 57. The historic Clackamas Lake Ranger Station is on the left, 1/4 miles past the junction. The ranger's residence is on the east side of the road across from the visitor center.
