= Bagby Guard Station =

- U.S. National Register of Historic Places
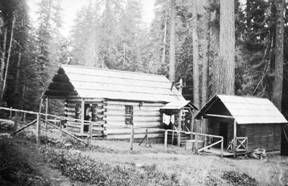
- Location: Mount Hood National Forest
- Nearest city: Estacada, Oregon
- Coordinates: 44.93583°N 122.1725°W
- Built: 1913
- Architect: Phillip Putz
- Architectural style: Oregon Rustic
- NRHP reference No.: 99001088
- Added to NRHP: September 13, 1999

Bagby Guard Station is a rustic cabin located in the Mount Hood National Forest in western Oregon, United States. It is adjacent to Bagby Hot Springs. The guard station was originally built to house fire crews assigned to patrol the surrounding National Forest. The Bagby Guard Station is listed on the National Register of Historic Places.

== History ==
In the 1920s and 1930s, National Forest road networks were underdeveloped. Forest Service employees often traveled many miles on foot or horseback to reach job sites, carrying all necessary equipment for fieldwork. This made daily commutes impractical. To facilitate work at remote sites, the Forest Service strategically placed guard stations throughout the forest to support fire patrols and project crews.

After World War II, the Forest Service greatly expanded its road network, allowing employees to get to most National Forest areas within a few hours. As a result, guard stations lost their utility. The Forest Service found new uses for some stations, but most were demolished or abandon.

The Bagby Guard Station is located in the Mount Hood National Forest forty miles southeast of Estacada, Oregon, just outside the boundary of Bull of the Woods Wilderness area. It was built next to Bagby Hot Springs in 1913 by Phillip F. Putz, the Forest Service guard assigned to the area. Putz also built a small storage shed adjacent to the cabin. In the years following its construction, the guard station was used as a barracks for Forest Service fire crews that patrolled the surrounding forest during the summer fire season. In 1925 Putz built his own home in Colton, Oregon.

During the 1920s, summer fire crews built a barn, dam, bathhouse, and additional shelters at the site. However, all of these facilities are now gone. Over time, the original guard station fell into disrepair so the Forest Service built a new cabin for the Bagby guard in 1974. Because of its rustic architecture and the cabin's unique historic value as an early Forest Service guard station, it was listed on the National Register of Historic Places in 1999. In 2006, volunteers from Northwest Forest Conservancy and Friends of Bagby worked with the Forest Service to repair and preserve the original Bagby Guard Station cabin.

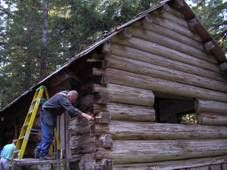
Bagby Guard Station cabin repair project

== Structure ==
The Bagby Guard Station is located in a remote area of the Clackamas Ranger District on the western slope of the Cascade Mountains, at 2,272 feet (693 m) elevation. It is a rustic cabin surrounded by undisturbed old-growth forest of mainly Douglas-fir, western hemlock, and western red cedar.

The guard station is a traditional log cabin structure with a wood shingle roof and a stone foundation. It has a single room measuring 24 by 16 feet (4.9 m). The logs were cut and peeled on the site so the cabin blends into the surrounding forest landscape. The original shed still sits next to the guard station cabin. Both historic structures were renovated in 2006. However, they are not open to the public.

In addition to the two historic structures, there are seven other building at the Bagby site. These include the new guard station and storage shed built in 1974. There are also three bathhouses built between 1983 and 1986 plus two outhouses for public use.

== Recreation ==
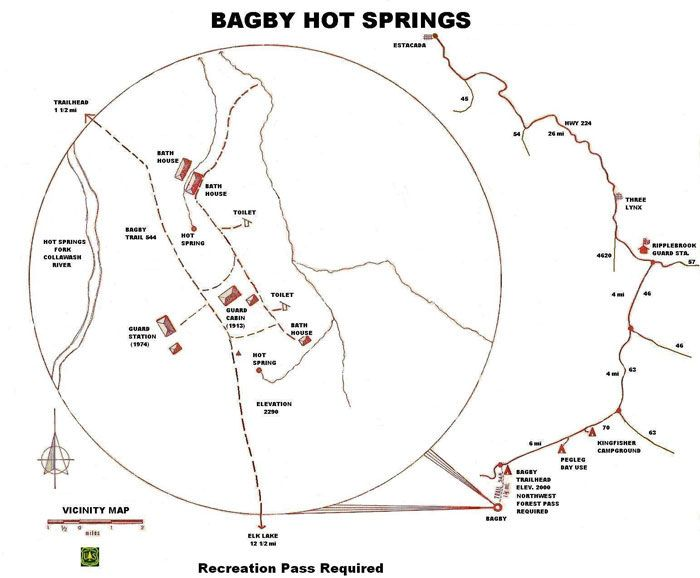
Local area map of Bagby Guard Station and Bagby Hot Springs

The guard station is located in the middle of Bagby Hot Springs. There are three major springs and several minor outlets that make up Bagby Hot Springs. The largest spring flows twenty-four gallons per minute at 138 degrees Fahrenheit. The two secondary springs produce 15 gallons per minute at 136 degrees and 3 gallons per minute at 120 degrees. There are three bath houses at the site. The Main Bathhouse has five cedar log tubs each in its own rustic, but private room. Nearby, the Lower Bathhouse has three log tubs and a large round tub located on an open deck. The Upper Bathhouse is located approximately 100 yards (91 m) southeast of the Main Bathhouse. It has one large round tub on an open deck. Bagby Hot Springs are open for day-use only. Camping is not permitted at the hot springs or along the trail to Bagby.

The 27,427-acre (110.99 km^{2}) Bull of the Woods Wilderness is only about a half mile up the trail from guard station, so visitor can easily access the wilderness trail network from Bagby. Bull of the Woods Peak is at the center of a 68-mile (109 km) trail system. The Pansy Lake Trail takes hikers to peak's 5,523-foot (1,683 m) summit where an old lookout tower commands a panoramic view of the surrounding area. Wilderness trails lead to a dozen scenic lakes with native trout populations, Twin Lakes and Elk Lake are the most popular. The headwaters of the Collawash, Breitenbush, and Little North Santiam Rivers are all found in the Bull of the Woods Wilderness.

== Access ==
There is no road to Bagby Guard Station; visitors must hike a 1.5-mile (2.4 km) trail from a Forest Service parking area to get to the site. It is a relatively easy hike with only a 200 feet (61 m) gain in of elevation along the way. The trail is maintained by the Forest Service and volunteers from the Northwest Forest Conservancy.

It is approximately 40 miles (64 km) from Estacada to the Bagby trailhead. A $5 Forest Service permit is required to park at the trailhead. Bagby is normally open year around, however, access roads to the trailhead may be close after some winter snow storms.
