= Rockwood Library =

Library in Oregon

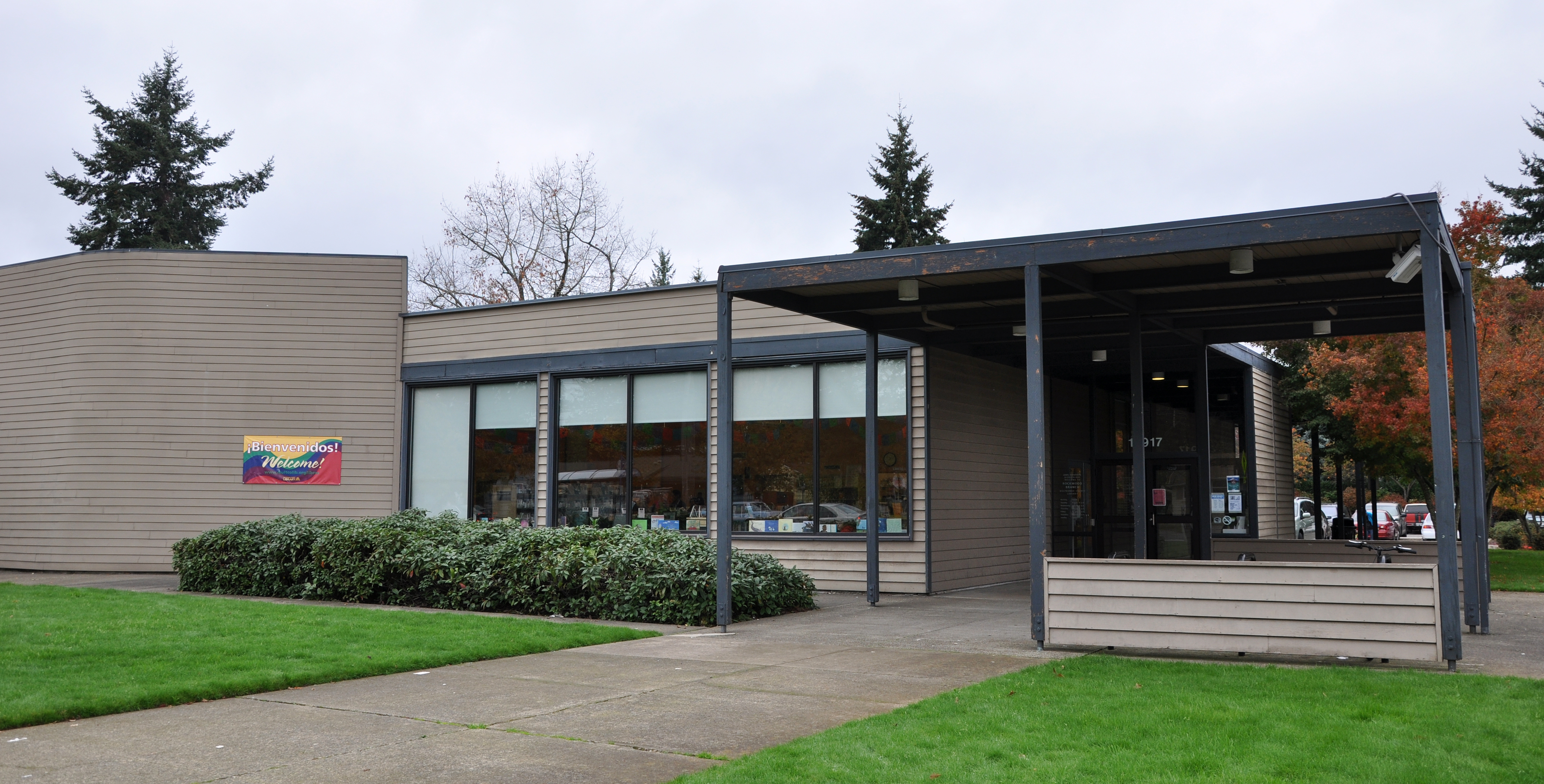
- Exterior and entrance in 2012

- Location within Portland, Oregon

General information
- Location: 17917 S.E. Stark Street, Portland, Oregon, United States
- Coordinates: 45.519676°N 122.478998°W
- Opened: April 10, 1963
- Owner: Multnomah County Library

Technical details
- Floor area: 6,435 square feet (597.8 m^{2})

Design and construction
- Architecture firm: Stewart, Richardson, Allen and McMath
- Main contractor: Neilson Construction and Investment Company

Renovating team
- Architects: Thomas Hacker and Associates

Website
- Rockwood Library

The Rockwood Library is a branch of the Multnomah County Library, located in Portland, Oregon. The branch offers the Multnomah County Library catalog of two million books, periodicals and other materials. The library also features a 30-person capacity meeting room for hosting community events at no charge on a first come, first served basis.

== History ==
In 1961 the Library Association of Portland (LAP) examined library use compared to population demographics and recommended the construction of five additional branch buildings. Three buildings would consolidate six "inefficient" branches and one would replace an existing but outdated structure. The Rockwood Library was the only new building in the proposal that would not replace another branch.

The LAP announced the purchase of a building site in April 1962. According to the LAP's 1962–63 annual report, "The Rockwood Branch, located about halfway between the Midland and Gresham branches, will serve a growing area with a population of over 20,000, a high percentage of which are children." The building was designed by Stewart, Richardson, Allen and McMath; Neilson Construction and Investment Company served as the contractor. The Rockwood Library was dedicated on April 10, 1963. The 5,724-square-foot (531.8 m^{2}) building housed a new collection of 12,000 books with the capacity to hold 20,000 volumes. Helen Gorder became the branch's first librarian.

A reading center was established at the library in the late 1980s, to serve the needs of illiterate adults learning to read. The center was funded by a grant from the Library Services and Construction Act, which also paid for a reading center at the Central Library in downtown Portland. Rockwood was selected due to its proximity to the Mt. Hood Literacy Coalition Group, connected with Mt. Hood Community College and the Salvation Army.

In 1999 the branch underwent renovation and expansion, opening on September 14 with 6,435 square feet (597.8 m^{2}) and the capacity to hold 30,000 volumes. Renovations were designed by Thomas Hacker and Associates; contract work was provided by Andersen Construction Co., Inc. In 2008, the library was reported to have about a dozen volunteers, many fluent in Spanish and Russian, available to assist library patrons. As of 2010, the library had about 10 tables and 15 computers. That year, Rockwood was the 12th library in the Multnomah County system to implement a new RFID-based self-checkout system designed to reduce costs and theft of library materials.

Renovations and improvements also took place in 2015 and 2025.

== Community role ==
Over the years the library has hosted numerous activities, including computer classes, ESL classes, finance education classes, knitting groups, language exchange programs, and Spanish-speaking book clubs. The library has also been called a "safe and dry to hang out" space for teens. A majority of the staff members are bilingual. Rockwood Library features Spanish and Russian literature.

In 2011, The Oregonian reported that nearly 800 items are circulated by 600 people visiting the library daily. The newspaper also reported the library had a budget of $804,477.
