= Hollywood Library =

Library building in Portland, Oregon, U.S.

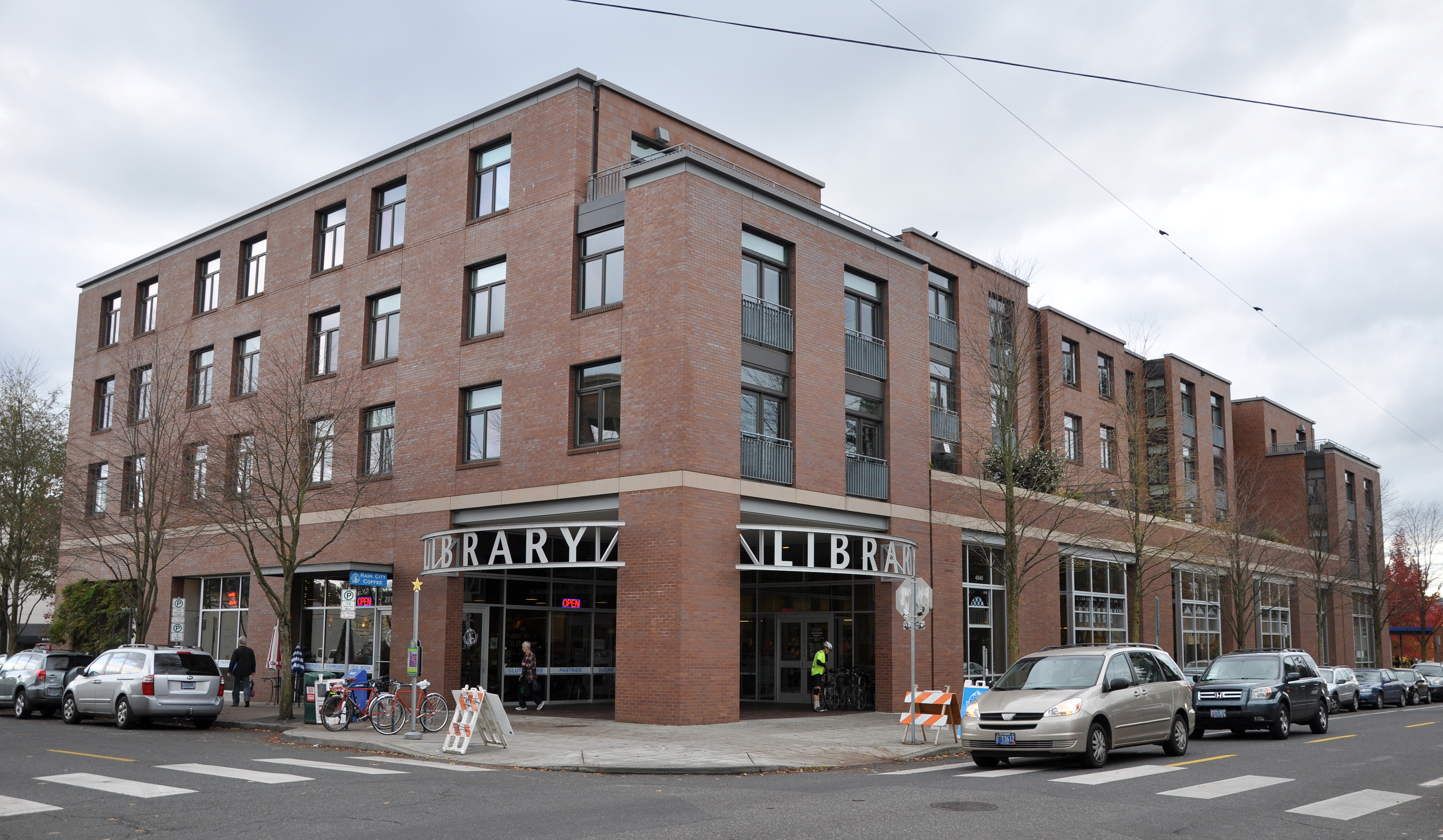
- Mixed-use building with library in 2012

- Location within Portland, Oregon

General information
- Location: Hollywood, 4040 NE Tillamook Street, Portland, Oregon, United States
- Coordinates: 45°32′15″N 122°37′17″W
- Opened: May 2, 2002
- Owner: Multnomah County Library and Sockeye Hollywood

Technical details
- Floor area: 13,000 square feet (1,200 m^{2})

Design and construction
- Architecture firm: Thomas Hacker and Associates

Website
- Hollywood Library

The Hollywood Library is a branch of the Multnomah County Library (MCL), in the Hollywood District of Portland in the U.S. state of Oregon. The building, at NE 41st Avenue and Tillamook Street, opened in 2002, and has three residential stories above the library. The previous building, constructed in 1959 at NE 39th Avenue and Hancock Street, was expected to be sold in 2003 to a private party, for its appraised price of $675,000. The branch offers the MCL catalog of two million books, periodicals and other materials.

== History ==
Known until 1959 as Rose City Park Library, the branch opened in 1917 at 1236 Sandy Road. Heavily used, the library soon ran short of space, and neighborhood residents sought funds for a larger building. By 1926, a new building designed by architect Jamieson Parker (who also designed the Belmont Library) was completed. It opened in August that year at 1170 NE Hancock Street.

In the 1950s as part of a long-range library plan, Multnomah County hired the Stewart and Richardson architectural firm to design a new building of 6,000 to 7,500 square feet (560 to 700 m^{2}) for Rose City Park Library. The building, at 3960 NE Hancock Street, was completed, and it opened in April 1959. Two months later, the library board changed the name of the branch from Rose City Park Library to Hollywood Library, which better reflected the name of the neighborhood it served.

By 1996, circulation at this library had more than doubled to an average of 47,000 items per month. Voters in that year approved a bond measure to improve libraries, especially the Hollywood branch and three others. The library hired architect Thomas Hacker and Associates and Sockeye Hollywood, a development firm, to construct a mixed-use building at NE 41st Avenue and Tillamook Street. The building, completed in 2002, has 47 mixed-income apartments above the library. The library itself has 13,000 square feet (1,200 m^{2}) of floor space, and the ground floor also has 815 square feet (75.7 m^{2}) of retail space. The new library opened on May 7, 2002.

In 2025 the library was temporarily closed for interior renovations funded by a 2020 library bond. It reopened in 2026 with a new children's area, dedicated space for patrons to use technology, lighting updates, and a mural celebrating Beverly Cleary.

== See also ==
- List of Carnegie libraries in Oregon
