= Multnomah County Library =

Library system serving Multnomah County, Oregon, United States

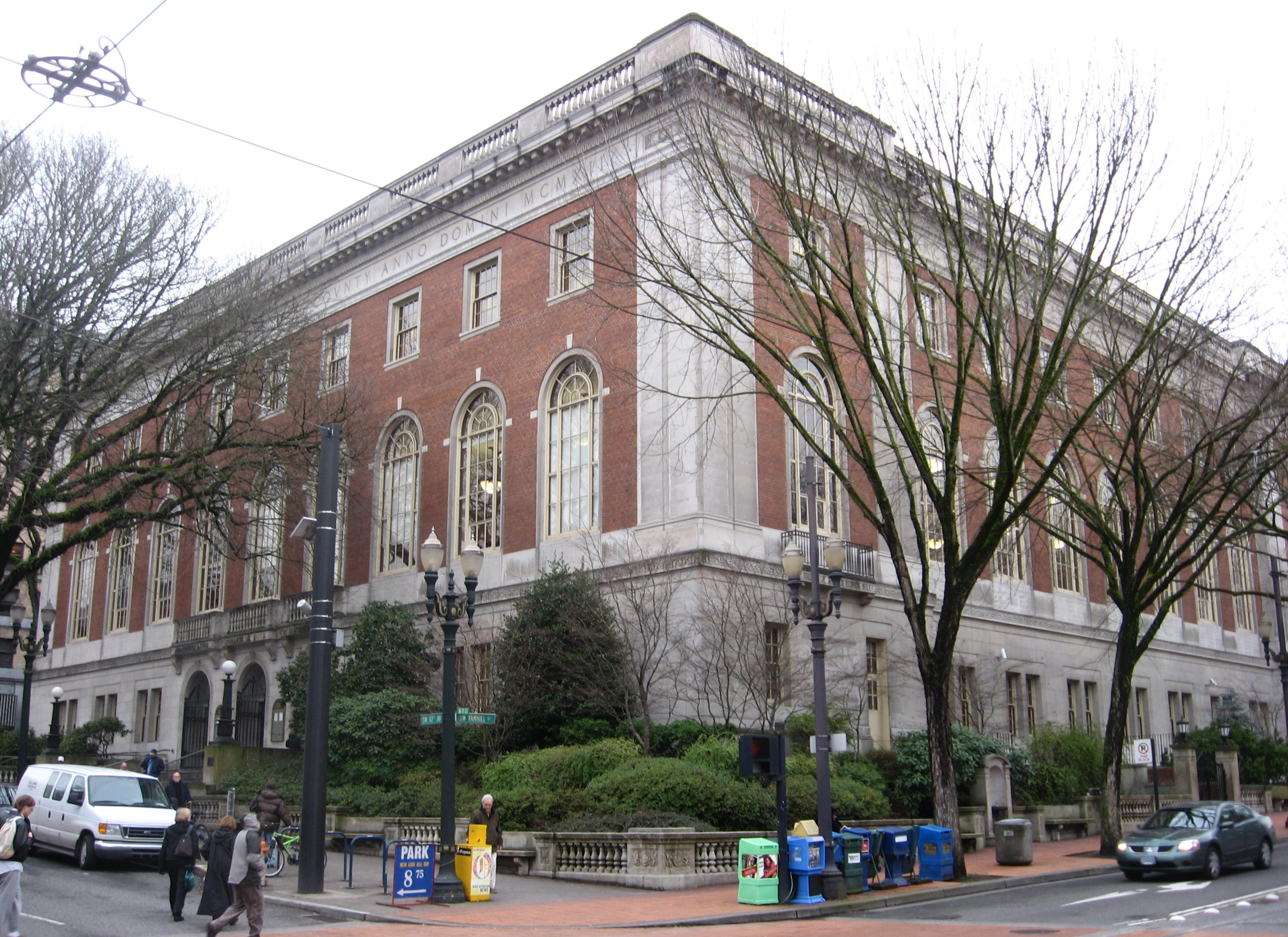
- Multnomah County Central Library
- 45°31′8″N 122°40′59″W
- Location: Multnomah County, Oregon
- Established: 1864
- Branches: 19

Collection
- Size: 1,994,641

Access and use
- Circulation: 22,715,292
- Population served: 724,680
- Members: 425,749

Other information
- Budget: $61 million
- Director: Annie Lewis
- Employees: 495 FTE
- Website: www.multcolib.org

Multnomah County Library is the public library system serving Portland and Multnomah County, Oregon, United States. A continuation of the Library Association of Portland, established in 1864, the system now has 19 branches offering books, magazines, DVDs, and computers. It is the largest library system in Oregon, serving a population of 801,546, with more than 369,377 registered borrowers.

== History ==
After Leland H. Wakefield began collecting funds door-to-door in 1863, the Mercantile Library Association was started on January 12, 1864, with subscriptions by Portland's merchant elite. Judge Matthew Deady was one of the early founders, with financial support coming from those such as Henry Corbett, William S. Ladd, and Erasmus D. Shattuck among others. In an attempt to be more inclusive, the name Library Association of Portland was chosen, likely on Judge Deady's suggestion. William Ladd was the elected its first president. The founders proclaimed "the library should forever be kept free of politics."

By March 1864, there were 153 members, who had subscribed $2,500. Harvey W. Scott served as the first librarian, part-time, at its first location on Stark Street in Portland. In 1869, the library moved to the Ladd & Tilton Bank Building where it received free rent. Deady was the president from 1874 until 1893, and found that fundraising was "like pulling teeth", calling the local establishment "closefisted narrow visioned millionaires" in 1888, also stating "The rich men of Portland will never do much for [the library] until they die, and maybe not then." The first major bequest came from Stephen Skidmore in 1883.

In 1891, a new separate library, the Portland Public Library, was founded by a group that included some former LAP board members. The two libraries merged in 1902.

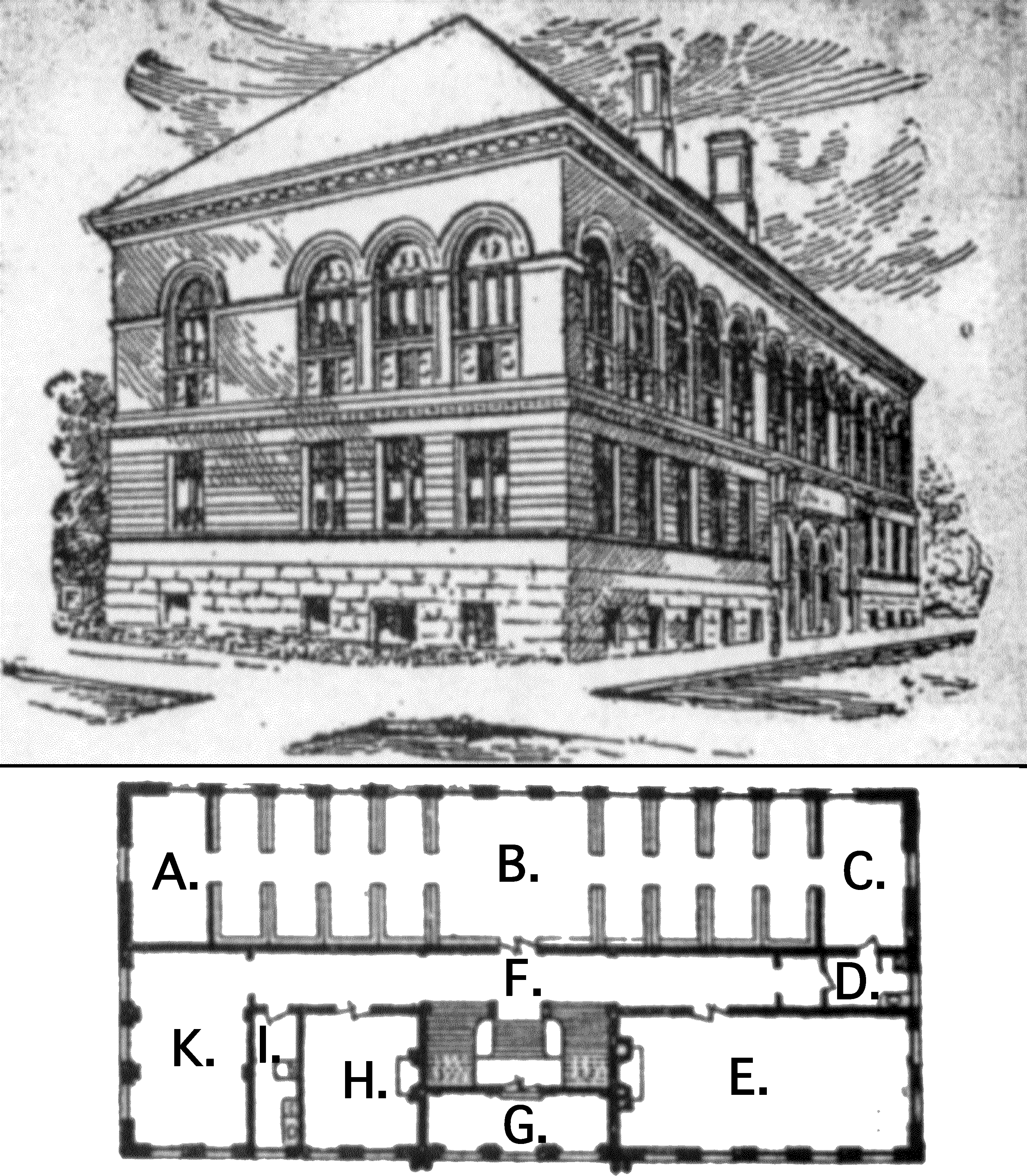
1893 library building, on Stark Street between 7th and Park. Artist's rendering and first floor plan originally published in the Oregonian, 1893.: 1. Librarian; 2. Stack Room; 3. Ladies Room; 4. Toilet; 5. Newspapers; 6. Corridor; 7. Vestibule; 8. Chess Room; 9. Toilet; 11. Magazines

The library moved to a new two-story stone library building in 1893. The building cost $156,477, representing 27 years of fundraising, mostly by Deady. A large portion of the funds came from Ella M. Smith, daughter of Benjamin F. Smith, in 1889. The library was staffed by D. F. W. Bursch, the library's first trained librarian, who oversaw the implementation of the Dewey Decimal system. It contained 20,000 volumes.

Prior to opening the library for free public access, the board tried to lower subscription costs as often as possible to allow a larger percentage of the general public to have access to the resource. The board debated whether to accept government support, with Deady arguing against, out of concern for the encroachment of political influence, and on the principle that citizens would place more value on something they themselves paid for, even if the payment were small. In 1897, board president George Henry Williams proposed that the librarian be empowered to remove materials deemed to demoralize people and disorganize society," an approach in keeping with common library practice at the time.

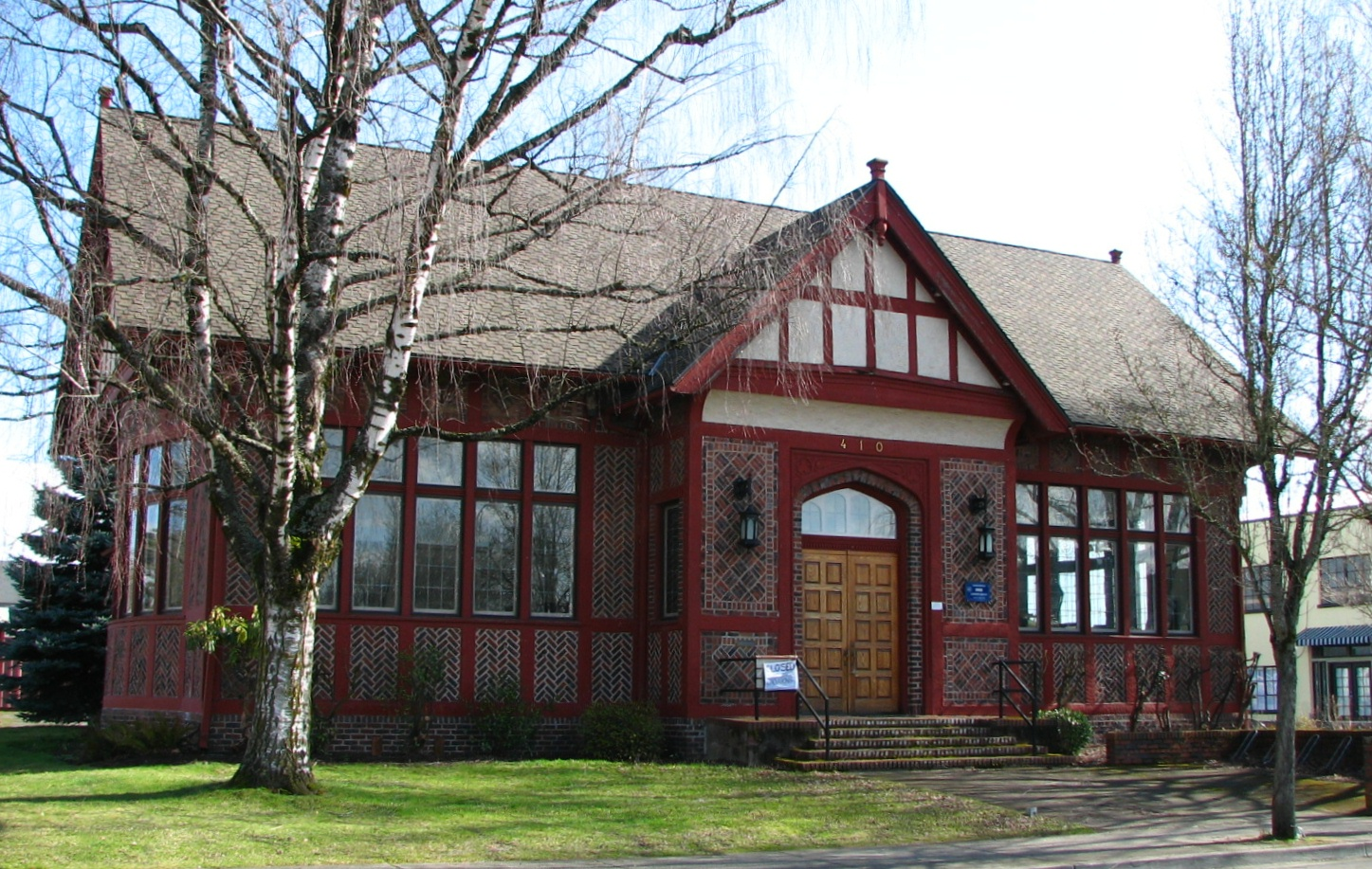
Former Gresham branch

The library declined an offer of a $100,000 donation from Andrew Carnegie in 1901, expressing "great pride" in Portland's ability to take care of itself; later, it did accept $105,000 in 1911 and $60,000 in 1912 to build branch locations. The library received nearly 9,000 books in 1900 from the estate of John Wilson; many of these were rare books. However, the bequest called for the books to be available free of charge to the public, thus the board voted to provide library services to the public under government contract. In 1901, the state passed a law to allow governments to tax citizens to pay for libraries; the legislation had been advanced primarily by the newly organized State Federation of Women's Clubs. The city of Portland and the library entered into a contract where the privately owned library continued to own its collection, but the city paid for services, thus creating a free publicly supported library. In January 1901, the library allowed books to circulate for the first time.

The governance and operation of library has a circuitous history. On March 16, 1902, Portland's library became the first free library in the state paid for by taxes. At that time it featured more than 38,000 volumes and 215 periodicals. In 1913, the Library Association of Portland (LAP) built the Central Library in downtown Portland at Tenth Street. They did not use any Carnegie funds for the project, instead financing came from a special two-year tax.

From 1901 to 1990, for 89 years the library was a two-rack system. While it was supported by public fund, its management was in the hands of LAP, a private non-profit organization, whose board membership was hereditary, passing from fathers and mothers to sons and daughters. from one generation to the next.

By 1978, ex-officio members joining the 35 member LAP board found out that board meetings were often proforma, while "real decisions" were made by a group meeting in a private club. At the same time, the library systems did not seem to work so well, with branches being closed and open hours cut back.

The situation was legally quite complicated, since LAP owned all the buildings, books, furniture, and equipment. On top of that it had a collection of rare books and valuable art pieces, and an endowment fund. The legal tangle took almost a decade to resolve. On July 1, 1990, the LAP officially transferred ownership of the library buildings and collections to Multnomah County.

== Branches ==
The Multnomah County Library operates 19 branches including the Central Library in downtown Portland.

=== Central Library ===
The Central Library in downtown Portland was designed by architect A. E. Doyle, and opened on September 6, 1913. It was one of the first libraries in the United States to feature an open-plan. The three-story Central Library was listed on the National Register of Historic Places as the Central Building, Public Library in 1979. It contains 17 miles (27 km) of bookshelf space and has more than 130 computers for the public. The branch contains 125,000 square feet (11,600 m^{2}) of space. From 1994 to 1997, the interior of the Central Library was partially gutted and extensively renovated.

=== Other branches ===
East County Library is the largest of the other branches with a total of 95,000 square feet (8,800 m^{2}). This is followed in size by the Midland Library which is 25,000 square feet (2,300 m^{2}). The Albina, St. Johns and North Portland branches are Carnegie libraries. (There were also four Carnegie libraries no longer part of the system: Arleta, East Portland, the old Gresham Library, and South Portland).

Branch	Address	Neighborhood	First branch opened	Current branch opened
Albina Library	216 N.E. Knott Street	Eliot	1906	2020
Belmont Library	1038 S.E. César E. Chávez Boulevard	Sunnyside	1924	1924
Capitol Hill Library	10723 S.W. Capitol Highway	W. Portland Park	1972	1972
East County Library	475 NW Division Street	Gresham	1903	2026
Fairview-Columbia Library	1520 N.E. Village Street	Fairview	2001	2001
Gregory Heights Library	7921 N.E. Sandy Boulevard	Roseway	1938	1966
Hillsdale Library	1525 S.W. Sunset Boulevard	Hillsdale	1913	2004
Holgate Library	7905 S.E. Holgate Boulevard	Foster-Powell	1911	1971
Hollywood Library	4040 N.E. Tillamook Street	Hollywood	1917	2002
Kenton Library	8226 N. Denver Avenue	Kenton	1903	2010
Midland Library	805 S.E. 122nd Avenue	Mill Park	1958	1996
North Portland Library	512 N. Killingsworth Street	Humboldt	1909	1913
Northwest Library	2300 N.W. Thurman Street	Northwest	2001	2001
Rockwood Library	17917 S.E. Stark Street	Rockwood	1963	1963
Sellwood-Moreland Library	7860 S.E. 13th Avenue	Sellwood	1905	2002
St. Johns Library	7510 N. Charleston Avenue	St. Johns	1913	1913
Troutdale Library	2451 S.W. Cherry Park Road	Troutdale	2010	2010
Woodstock Library	6008 S.E. 49th Avenue	Woodstock	1917	2000

== Details ==
As of FY2010, the system has a total of 486 FTE employees, including 91 librarian FTE. Total annual revenue was just over $62.8 million, with expenditures of $60.5 million. There are more than 425,000 library card holders in the system that serves a population of over 700,000 people, the largest in the state. Multnomah County Library has a total of 1,994,541 books, DVDs, CDs, periodicals, and other library materials. There was a total of 5,799,497 visits in FY2010 with the total circulation of 22,715,292. The library system contains a total of about 700 computer search stations for the public and a combined total of 277,762 square feet (25,804.9 m^{2}) of space at all 19 libraries. The library is also a depository for the Federal Depository Library Program.

== See also ==
- Children's Internet Protection Act
