= Holgate Library =

Library in Oregon

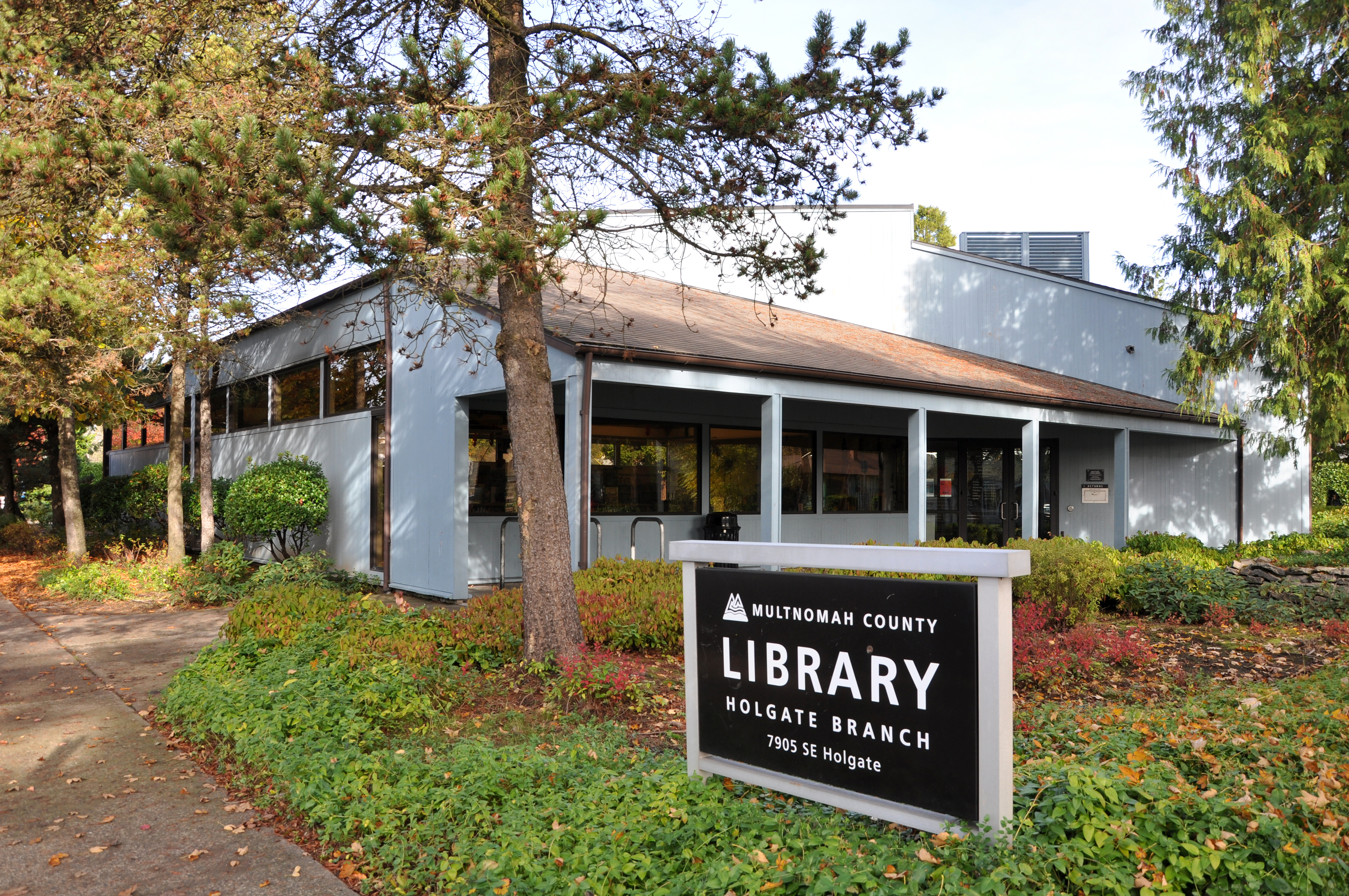
- Front entrance in 2012

- Location within Portland, Oregon

General information
- Location: Foster-Powell, 7905 S.E. Holgate Boulevard, Portland, Oregon, United States
- Coordinates: 45°29′26″N 122°34′56″W
- Opened: May 19, 1971
- Renovated: October 17, 2000, July 13, 2024
- Owner: Multnomah County Library

Technical details
- Floor area: 6,060 square feet (563 m^{2})
- Lifts/elevators: 2 (1 staff only)

Design and construction
- Architecture firm: Allen, McMath, Hawkins Architects

Renovating team
- Architects: Thomas Hacker and Associates
- Renovating firm: Andersen Construction Company

Website
- Website

The Holgate Library is a branch of the Multnomah County Library, in Portland in the U.S. state of Oregon.

== Description and history ==
The branch offers the Multnomah County Library catalog of two million books, periodicals and other materials. Opening on May 19, 1971, it replaced the Arleta and Lents branch libraries, though the area had been served as early as 1904 with a deposit station in a drug store in Lents. Renovated in 2000, the building had 6,060 square feet (563 m^{2}) of floor space and held up to 30,000 volumes. The renovations included seismic upgrades, a new roof, new windows, and a solar-powered electricity back-up system, among other items. In February 2008, the branch added the county's only teen and children's librarians.

Holgate was cited, along with the Midland and Belmont branches, as one of several branches serving the Montavilla neighborhood, when that neighborhood's branch was sold by the county in 2005.

Construction began on a new two-story home for the library in 2022. The new larger, modernized facility opened in 2024.

== See also ==
- List of Carnegie libraries in Oregon
