= Capitol Hill Library =

Library in Portland, Oregon, U.S.

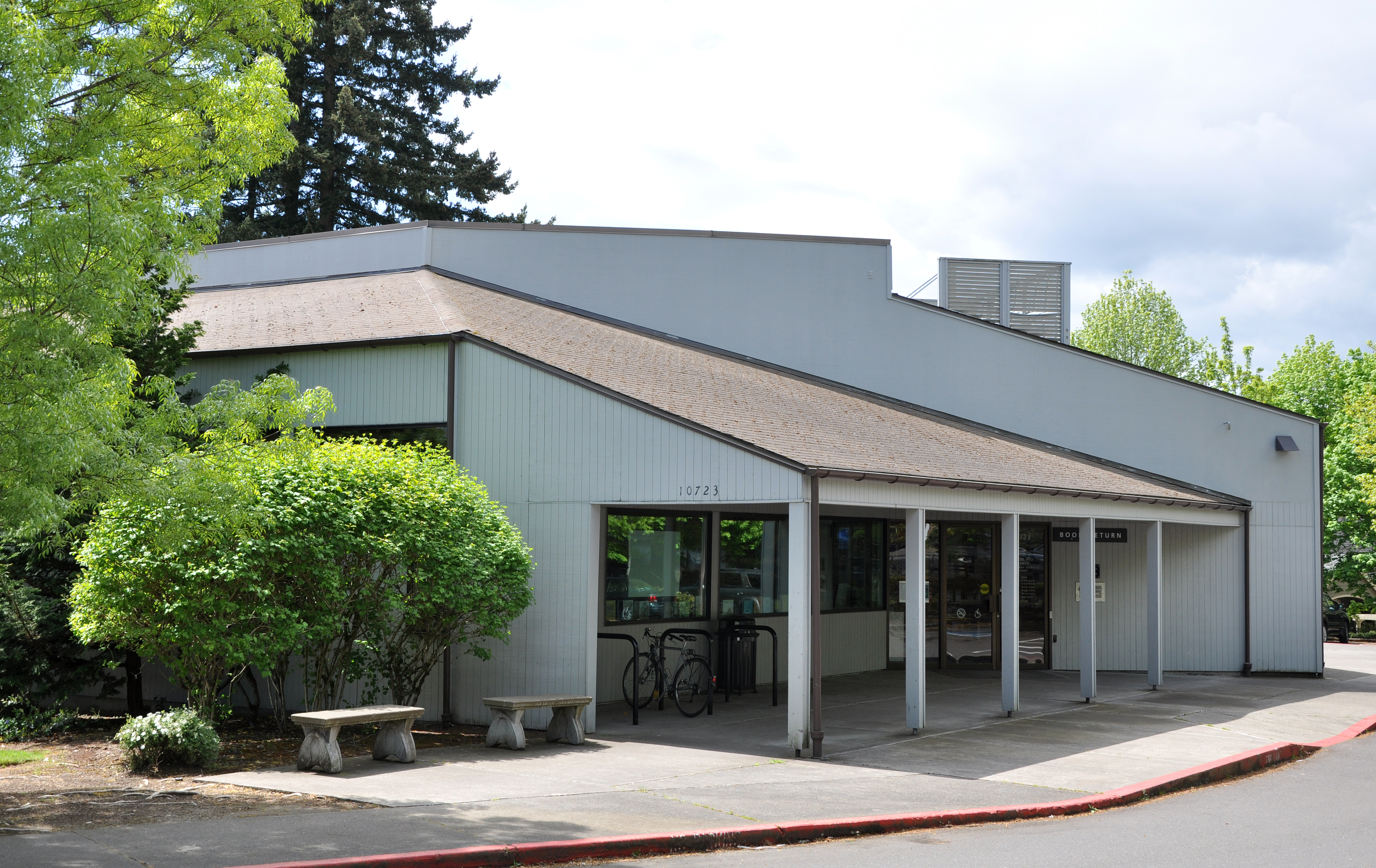
- Exterior view in 2013

- Location within Portland, Oregon

General information
- Location: West Portland Park, 10723 S.W. Capitol Highway, Portland, Oregon, United States
- Coordinates: 45°26′53″N 122°43′32″W
- Opened: December 6, 1972
- Renovated: February 16, 1999
- Owner: Multnomah County Library

Technical details
- Floor area: 6,060 square feet (563 m^{2})

Design and construction
- Architecture firm: Allen, McMath and Hawkins
- Main contractor: Hufford Construction Company

Renovating team
- Architects: Thomas Hacker and Associates
- Renovating firm: Andersen Construction Company

Website
- Capitol Hill Library

The Capitol Hill Library is a branch of the Multnomah County Library, in the West Portland Park neighborhood of Portland in the U.S. state of Oregon. The branch offers the Multnomah County Library catalog of two million books, periodicals and other materials. Capitol Hill and the Holgate branch are of a similar design.

== History ==
Until the 1960s, Portland's system of public libraries relied heavily on the downtown Central Library supplemented by small collections at many locations in outlying neighborhoods . As population densities changed, the library board responded by establishing larger collections in fewer locations and creating new branch libraries. From 1967 through 1969, the board worked to establish a new branch near Capitol Hill in the West Portland Park neighborhood. The architectural plan was the same as that of the Holgate Library.

Although the library opened part-time for a month in early 1972, it did not open officially until December 5, 1972, aided by federal revenue sharing funds. Budget crises affected the library through the 1970s and early 1980s, and Capitol Hill sometimes operated on reduced hours and book budgets through 1984. In that year, voters approved a three-year serial levy (tax) to help fund the library system. Subsequent temporary levies supported the system through November 2012, when voters approved a permanent levy.

In 1996, Multnomah County voters passed a bond measure to renovate some branches and to upgrade technology across the system. Closed for renovation in mid-1998, Capitol Hill reopened on February 16, 1999. The architect on the original building was Allen, McMath and Hawkins, and the renovation architect was Thomas Hacker and Associates. Capitol Hill has a floor area of 6,060 square feet (563 m^{2}) with a capacity of 20,000 volumes.

A community garden was added in 2017, and interior removations took place in 2023–2024.

== See also ==
- List of Carnegie libraries in Oregon
