= Fairview-Columbia Library =

Oregon public library

Coordinates: 45.532238°N 122.439351°W

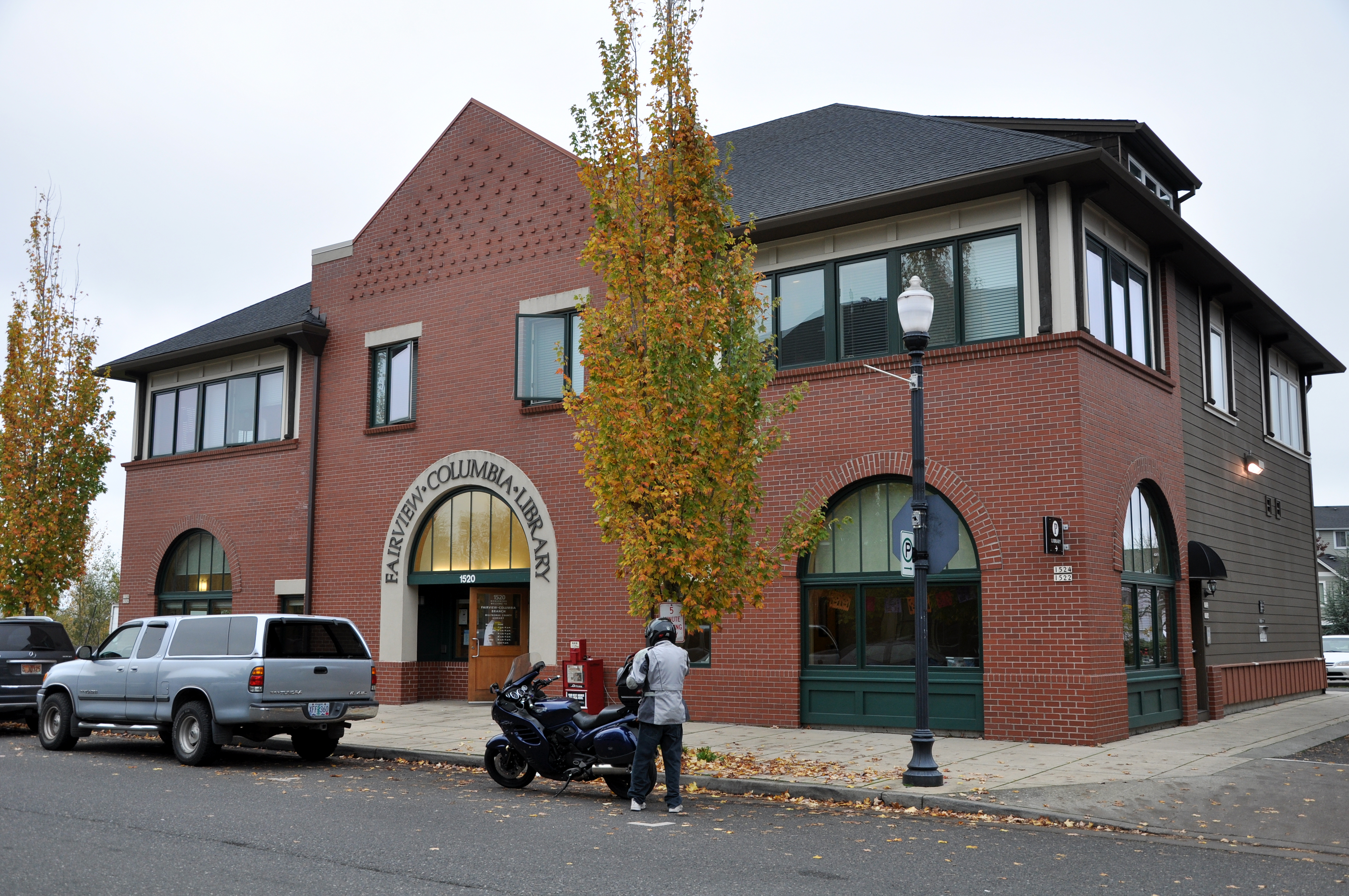
- Exterior and entrance in 2012

General information
- Location: 1520 NE Village Street, Fairview, Oregon, United States
- Opened: November 13, 2001; 24 years ago
- Owner: Multnomah County Library

Technical details
- Floor area: 4,000 square feet (370 m^{2})

Design and construction
- Architecture firm: Group Mackenzie; Thomas Hacker and Associates
- Main contractor: Commercial Contractors

Website
- Fairview-Columbia Library

The Fairview-Columbia Library is a branch of the Multnomah County Library, in Fairview in the U.S. state of Oregon. It serves residents of Fairview, Troutdale, Corbett, and elsewhere in the eastern part of the county. The branch offers the Multnomah County Library catalog of two million books, periodicals and other materials.

== History ==
Library service in Fairview was first established in 1903 via a "deposit station" in a private store, and later in the city hall. The deposit station closed in 1915. The Gresham Library served Fairview for decades, for instance with the head librarian visiting Fairview on a weekly basis for a children's story hour.

The new building opened on November 13, 2001, with a dedication ceremony held on November 17. The opening of the Fairview branch marked the first of many mixed use buildings in the county system. The library, with a floor area of 4,000 square feet (370 m^{2}), is on the ground floor, and four apartments are on the upper floor.

Group Mackenzie was the building architect, and Thomas Hacker and Associates acted as a tenant improvement consultant. Commercial Contractors was the contracting firm on the project. The library can hold up to 20,000 books.

In 2025, the library closed temporarily for interior renovations funded by a 2020 building bond.
