= Troutdale Library =

Library in Oregon

Coordinates: 45.527712°N 122.412693°W

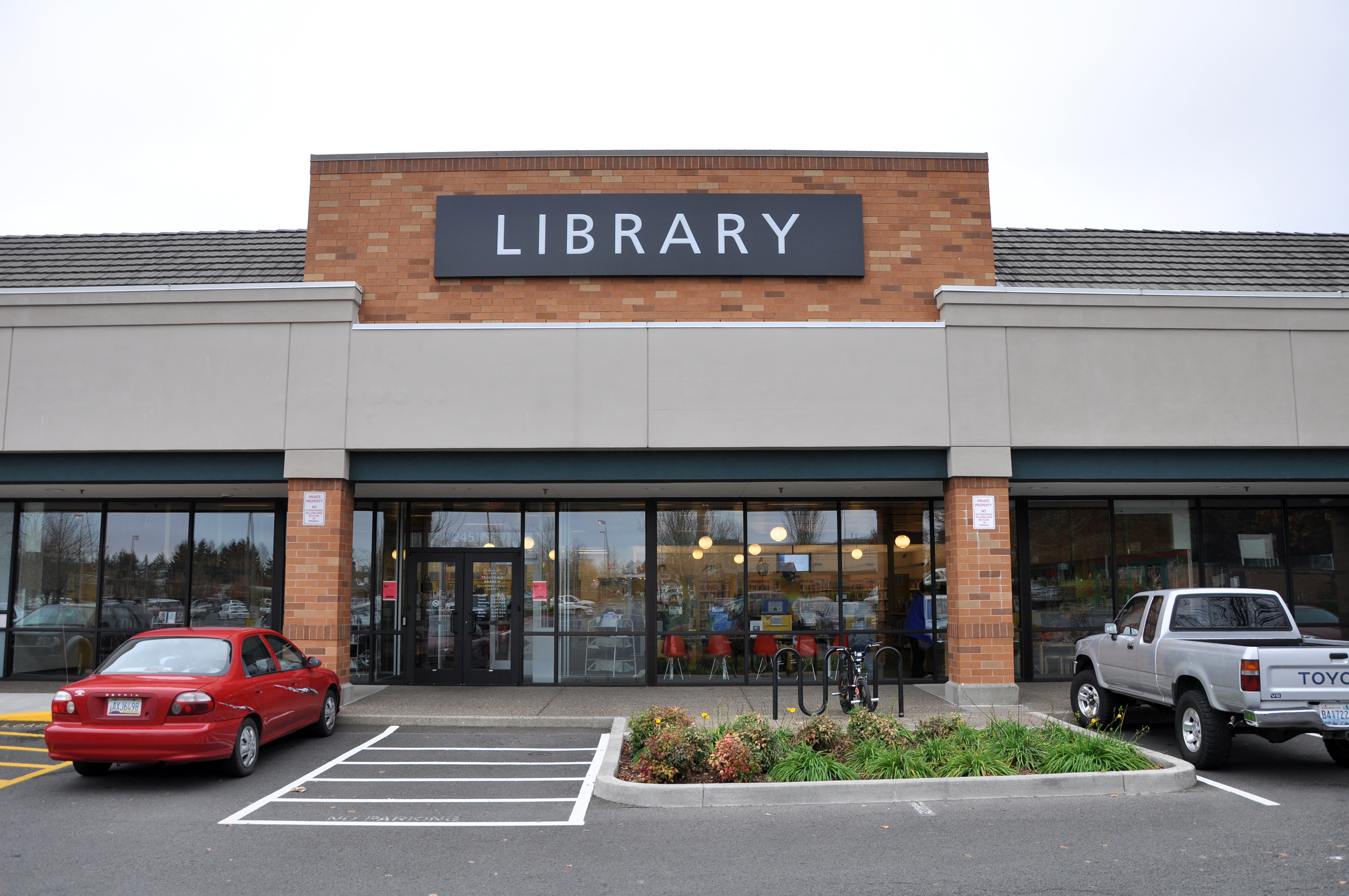
- Storefront location in 2012

- Location within Oregon

General information
- Location: Cherry Park Market Center, 2451 Southwest Cherry Park Road, Troutdale, Oregon, United States
- Opened: July 2010
- Owner: Multnomah County Library

Technical details
- Floor area: 6,000 square feet (560 m^{2})

Website
- Troutdale Library

The Troutdale Library is a branch of the Multnomah County Library, in Troutdale in the U.S. state of Oregon. The library, part of the Cherry Park Market Center, offers the Multnomah County Library catalog of two million books, periodicals and other materials.

== History ==
In November 2009, the Multnomah County Library leased a space in a shopping center to start a branch in Troutdale. The 6,000-square-foot (560 m^{2}) retail space was then renovated the next year by general contractor Brockamp & Jaeger. The renovations were designed by Hennebery Eddy Architects, and were completed in time for an opening in July 2010. The branch was closed in December 2025 due to damage to the roof.

== See also ==
- History of libraries
- Library science
- List of Carnegie libraries in Oregon
