= Kenton Library =

Library in Oregon

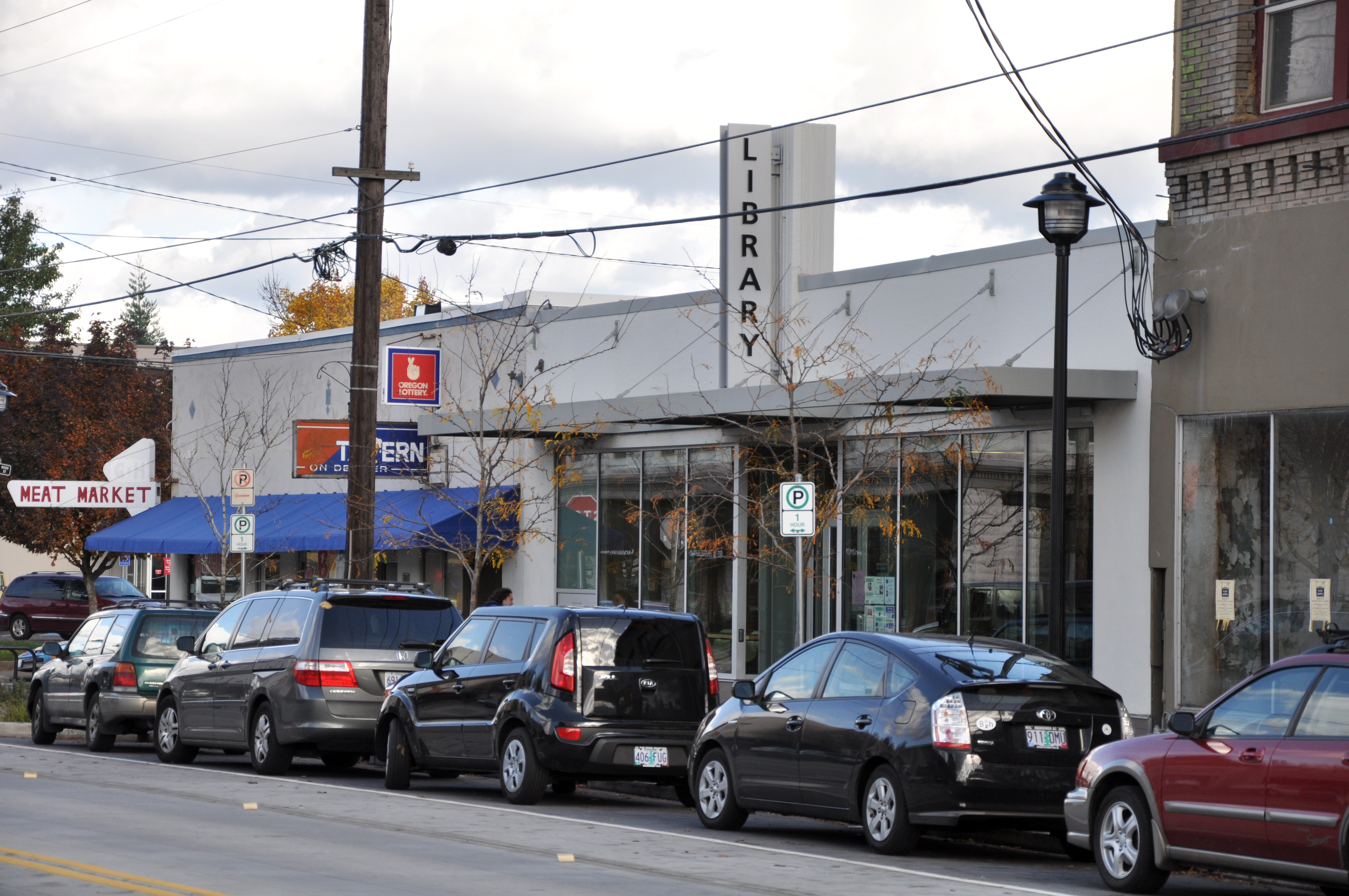
- Storefront entrance in 2012

- Location within Portland, Oregon

General information
- Location: Kenton, 8226 N. Denver Avenue, Portland, Oregon, United States
- Coordinates: 45.582813°N 122.686719°W
- Opened: March 8, 2010
- Owner: Multnomah County Library

Technical details
- Floor area: 6,000 square feet (560 m^{2})

Renovating team
- Architect: Hennebery Eddy Architects Inc.
- Renovating firm: Cedar Mill Construction Company

Website
- Kenton Library

The Kenton Library is a branch of the Multnomah County Library (MCL), in the Kenton neighborhood of Portland in the U.S. state of Oregon. Preceded by reading rooms in North Portland and later by the Lombard Branch Library, the Kenton Library opened in 2010 in a storefront on North Denver Avenue. The branch offers the MCL catalog of two million books, periodicals and other materials.

== History ==
Public library service to the neighborhood started in 1903, when the Library Association of Portland placed a small collection of books available to patrons via a nearby school. In 1907, two reading rooms—the Peninsular Reading Room and the St. Johns Reading Room—opened in the Kenton vicinity. Each had a collection of between 200 and 300 books. The University Park Reading Room, also near Kenton, opened a year later.

A Lombard Branch Library opened in 1927. It was a joint effort by residents of the Kenton and the Peninsula neighborhoods, who wanted a larger library but could not afford one even with help from the Library Association. The two communities held a fundraising drive, formed a corporation, borrowed money, and paid to construct a library building at Lombard and Boston streets. In 1937, the corporation gave the building to the Library Association, which agreed to maintain the library and pay the mortgage debt. In 1981, Multnomah County voters said "no" to one of the library funding requests on the ballot. The subsequent reductions in library service included closing the Lombard Library.

Advocates for a Lombard Library, a citizens group, formed in 2000 to restore library service to the neighborhood. Their quest for funding and for the support of the Multnomah County Commissioners eventually met with success. In 2006, voters approved a levy that included funds for new libraries in North Portland and eastern Multnomah County. The commissioners subsequently chose a storefront site at 8226 N. Denver Avenue for the Kenton Library, a building constructed in 1951. It opened on March 8, 2010, after a remodel that included an addition to increase space to 6,000 square feet (560 m^{2}). Hennebery Eddy Architects Inc. designed the renovations with Cedar Mill Construction Company serving as the general contractor on the project.

In 2025, the library closed temporarily for interior renovations funded by a 2020 building bond.

== Radio tags ==
Kenton Library was the first new library in the Multnomah County Library system to have its entire collection tagged with radio-frequency identification devices (RFID)s before it opened. The MCL began installing the RFIDs systemwide in 2009. Tags are equipped with antennas that respond to radio signals. They help prevent theft by triggering an alarm at the door if an item has not been properly checked out, and they reduce the number of steps needed at checkout. Library staff can scan rows of books with a hand wand or catalog a whole stack of books placed on a flat scanner.

== Urban renewal ==
The Portland Development Commission carried out a $2.85 million urban-renewal project in Kenton in 2010. Improvements included better street pavement, wider sidewalks, trees, and planter boxes in the block that includes the library and a variety of small businesses. However, not all of the block has been modernized. In March 2011, business owners expressed concern about forced entry into a vacant building next to the library.

== See also ==
- History of libraries
- Library science
- List of Carnegie libraries in Oregon
