= Gresham Carnegie Library =

Former library and museum in Oregon

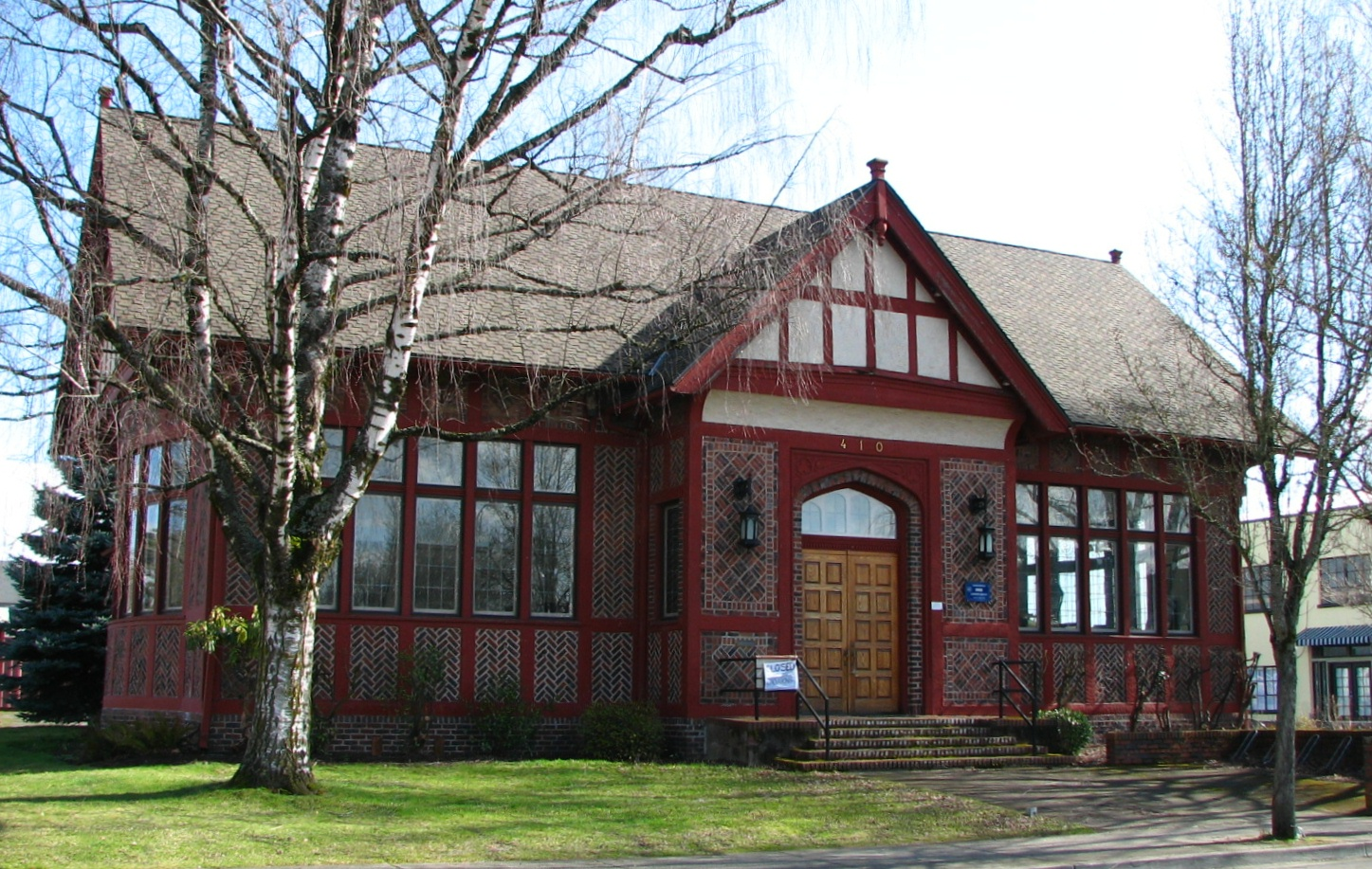
- Gresham Carnegie Library in 2008
- 45.50055°N 122.43072°W
- Location: Gresham, Oregon, United States
- Type: Library
- Established: 1913
- Branch of: Multnomah County Library

The Gresham Carnegie Library, is a historic building in Gresham, Oregon. The Tudor style building designed by Folger Johnson was built in 1913 and was added to the National Register of Historic Places in January 2000. It served as a public library in the Multnomah County Library system from 1913 until December 1989 when the Gresham Library opened.

At that time the Gresham Historical Society purchased the building and opened the Gresham History Museum. The building underwent six months of renovations in 2012.

== See also ==
- List of Carnegie libraries in Oregon
- National Register of Historic Places listings in Multnomah County, Oregon
