= Northwest Library =

Public library in Portland, Oregon, U.S.

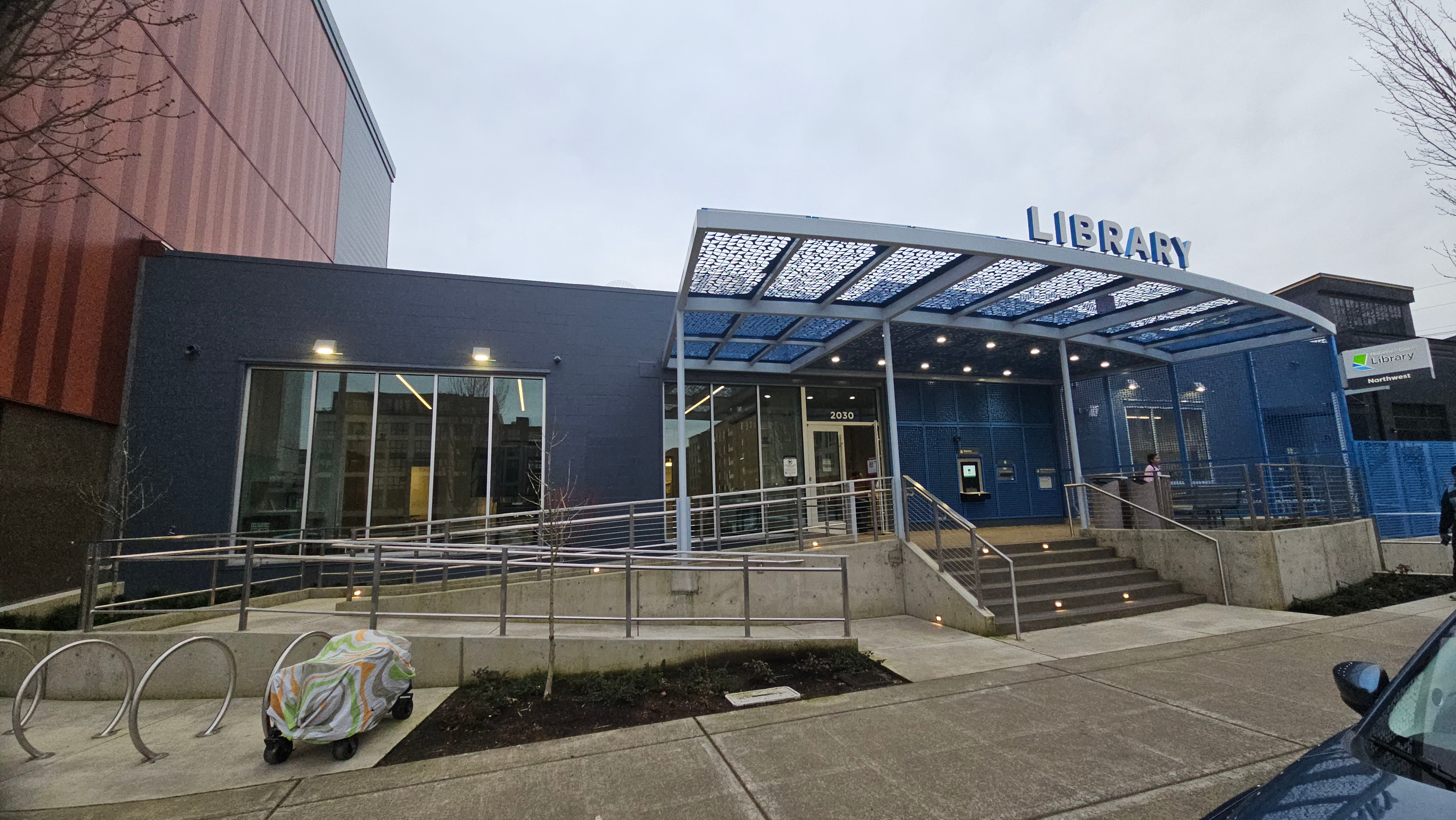
- Entrance to the branch

- Location within Portland, Oregon

General information
- Location: 2030 NW Pettygrove Street, Portland, Oregon, United States
- Coordinates: 45.532591°N 122.693484°W
- Opened: October 30, 2001
- Owner: Multnomah County Library

Technical details
- Floor area: 5,000 square feet (460 m^{2})

Renovating team
- Architects: Holst Architecture (exterior) and Thomas Hacker and Associates (interior)

Website
- Northwest Library

The Northwest Library is a branch of the Multnomah County Library in Portland, Oregon, United States. The branch, which opened in 2001, offers the Multnomah County Library catalog of two million books, periodicals and other materials.

== History ==
The branch opened on October 30, 2001, and was the first new branch in the Multnomah County system since 1972. At 5,000 square feet (460 m^{2}), the library is designed to accommodate 20,000 volumes. Located in Portland's most densely populated community, it was highly anticipated by neighbors. The building previously was home to the Harris Wine Cellar.

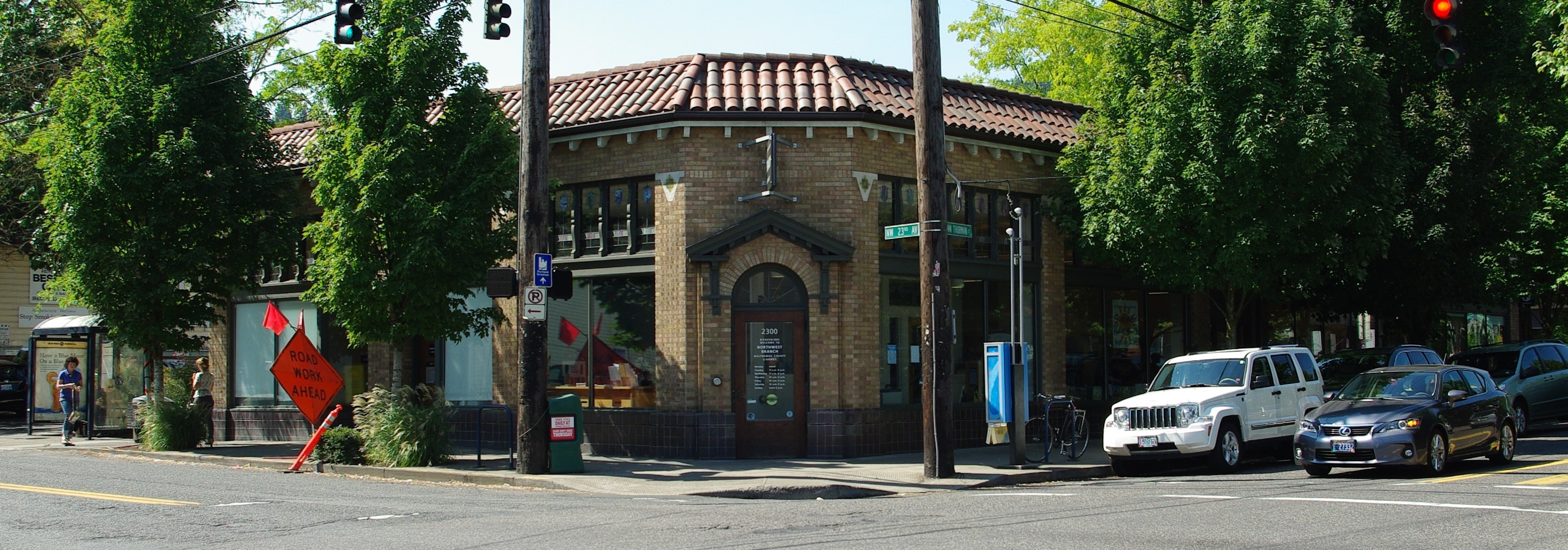
Northwest 23rd Avenue location (pictured in 2012)

The new library was funded by a $113 million levy passed in 1998, which funded reconstruction or renovation of 12 of the system's 15 branches. As of May 2000, Multnomah County officials were considering one location between N.W. 22nd and 23rd avenues and N.W. Lovejoy Street, and another on N.W. 23rd Avenue and Thurman Street. Then-county commissioner Diane Linn worked with county officials to find the location. Including affordable housing in the mixed use design of the building was an important consideration. The Thurman Street location was ultimately selected. Another $77,000 was provided to the branch by the Library Foundation in November 2001, with the majority of that added to a permanent fund for the branch.

Architects for the renovation of the existing building were Holst Architecture for the exterior and Thomas Hacker and Associates for the interior. Northwest General Contractors was the contractor. Structural changes during the renovation included seismic upgrades and improved access for patrons with disabilities. Interior redesign added a meeting room, and the library was made Internet-ready.

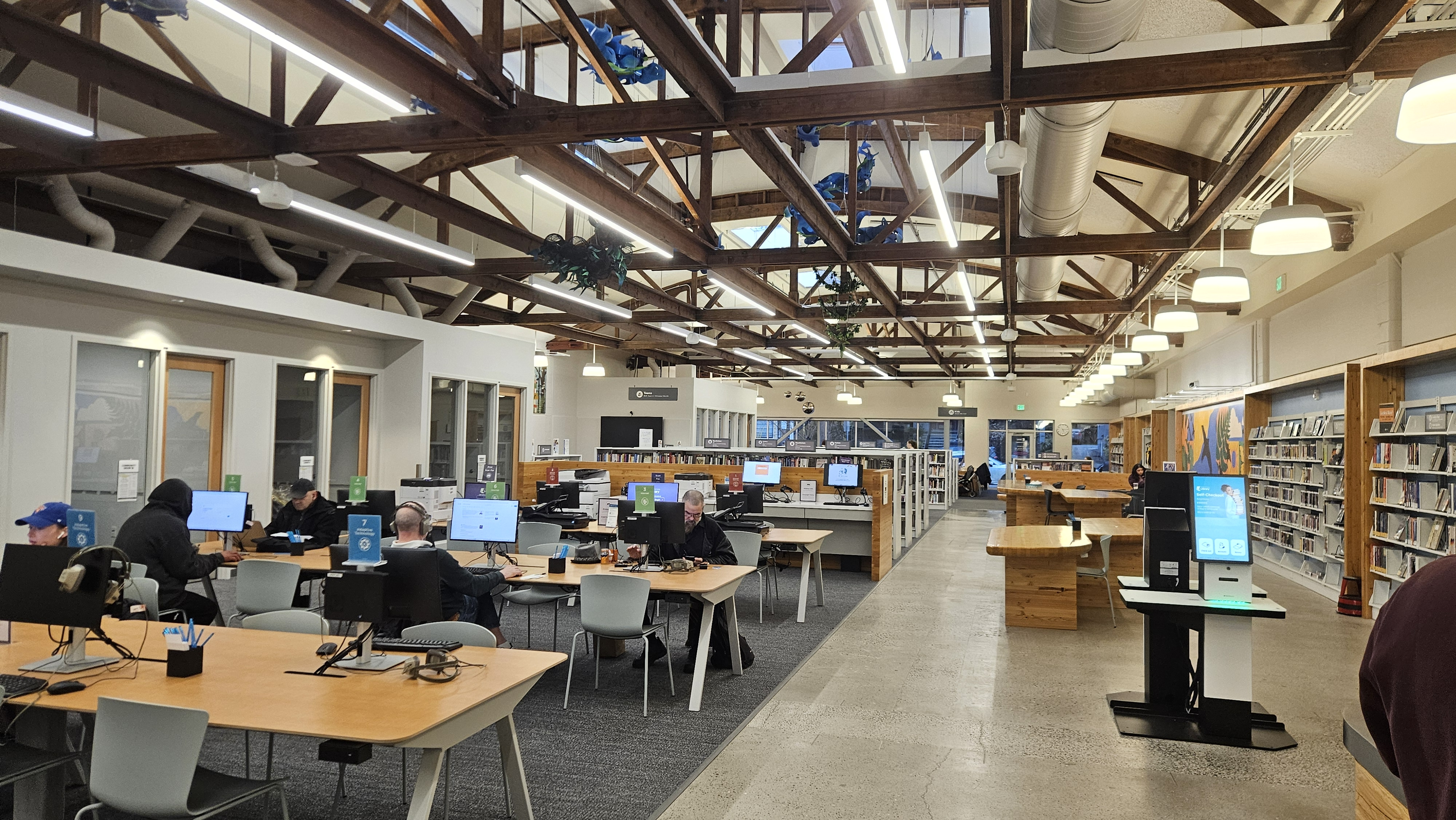
Interior of Northwest Pettygrove Street location (pictured in 2026)

The library moved to a new, permanent location on January 10, 2026, to a new spot located at 2030 NW Pettygrove Street. New features include a play and learning space for children and families, a teen area, updated technology and new community art. The county purchased the building in 2021 using bond funds and renovated the space to increase the size to 11,000 square feet (1,000 m^{2}) at a cost of $21 million. The prior space closed on November 25, 2025, to prepare for the move. The renovations were designed by Hennebery Eddy Architects, with Howard S. Wright as the contractor.
