= Gregory Heights Library =

Library in Portland, Oregon, U.S.

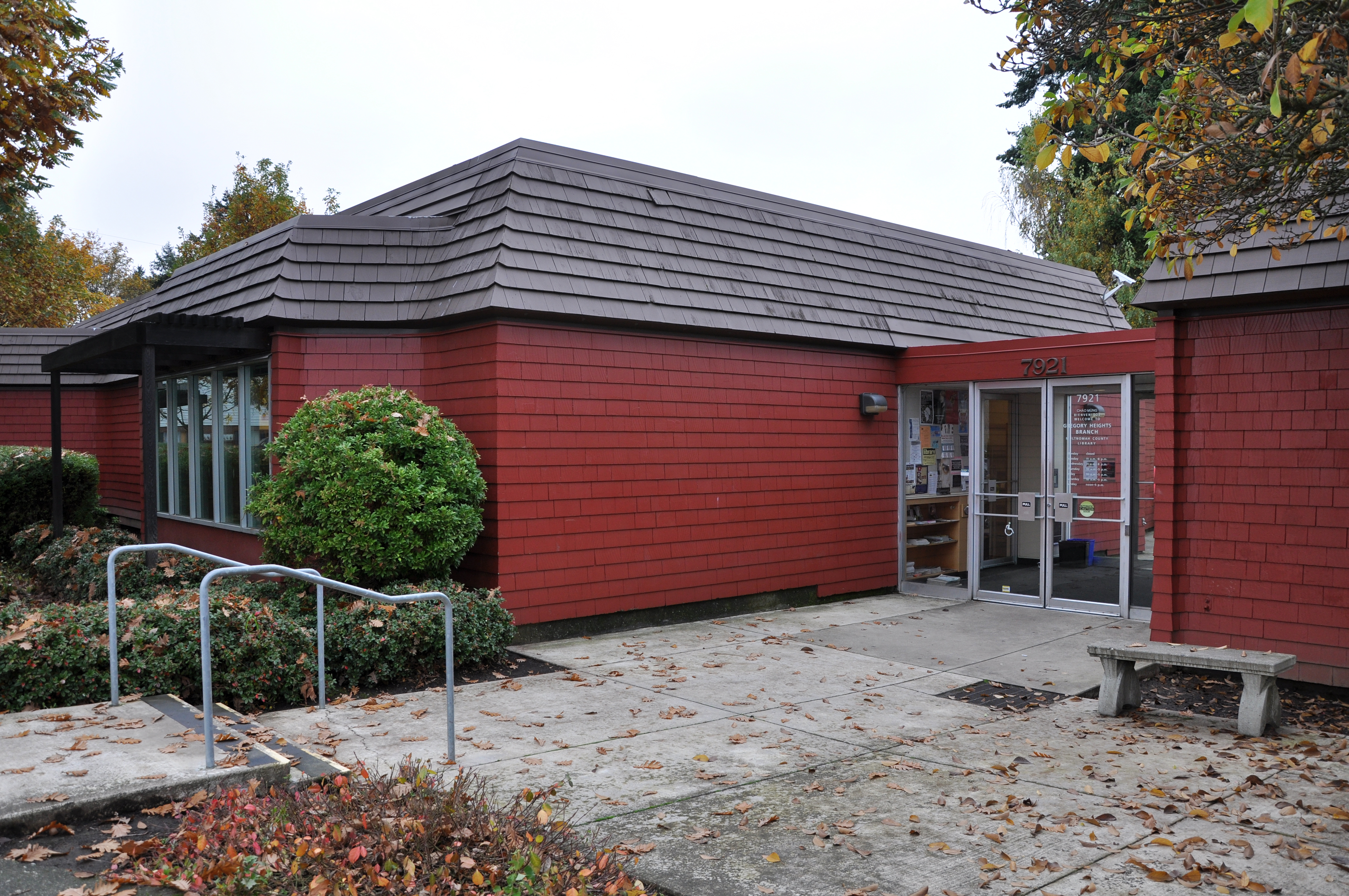
- Front entrance

- Location within Portland, Oregon

General information
- Location: 7921 NE Sandy Boulevard, Portland, Oregon, United States
- Coordinates: 45°33′6″N 122°34′53″W
- Opened: February 23, 1966
- Renovated: March 2, 1999
- Owner: Multnomah County Library

Technical details
- Floor area: 5,997 square feet (557.1 m^{2})

Design and construction
- Architecture firm: Farnham and Peck
- Main contractor: Cloyd R. Watt

Renovating team
- Architects: Thomas Hacker and Associates
- Renovating firm: Andersen Construction Company

Website
- Gregory Heights Library

The Gregory Heights Library is a branch of the Multnomah County Library, in Portland in the U.S. state of Oregon. The branch offers the Multnomah County Library catalog of two million books, periodicals and other materials.

The library branch first opened in 1938. The current branch, located at N.E. 79th Avenue and Sandy Boulevard, opened in 1966. It cost $83,000 to build, and was designed by the architecture firm Farnham and Peck.

== History ==
The library operated as a small reading room at 3448 N.E. 72nd Avenue from 1938 through 1956, when the Library Association of Portland replaced it with a bookmobile. By 1962, the association had approved construction of a branch in the Gregory Heights neighborhood. The new Gregory Heights Library, at N.E. 79th Avenue and N.E. Sandy Boulevard, opened on February 24, 1966. Its collection included 10,000 books.

In the 1980s, the library added computer terminals, more books, and southeast Asian materials in Vietnamese and Cambodian. After Multnomah County voters approved a bond measure in 1996 to repair branch libraries and improve library technology system-wide, Gregory Heights Library closed in July 1998 for renovation. It reopened on March 2, 1999.

The original architect of the building was Farnham and Peck. Thomas Hacker and Associates was the architect for the renovation. The library has a floor area of 5,997 square feet (557.1 m^{2}) and a capacity of 20,000 volumes.

The library closed temporarily in 2023–2024 for renovations funded by a 2020 building bond.

== See also ==
- History of libraries
- Library science
- List of Carnegie libraries in Oregon
