= Hillsdale Library =

Library in Oregon

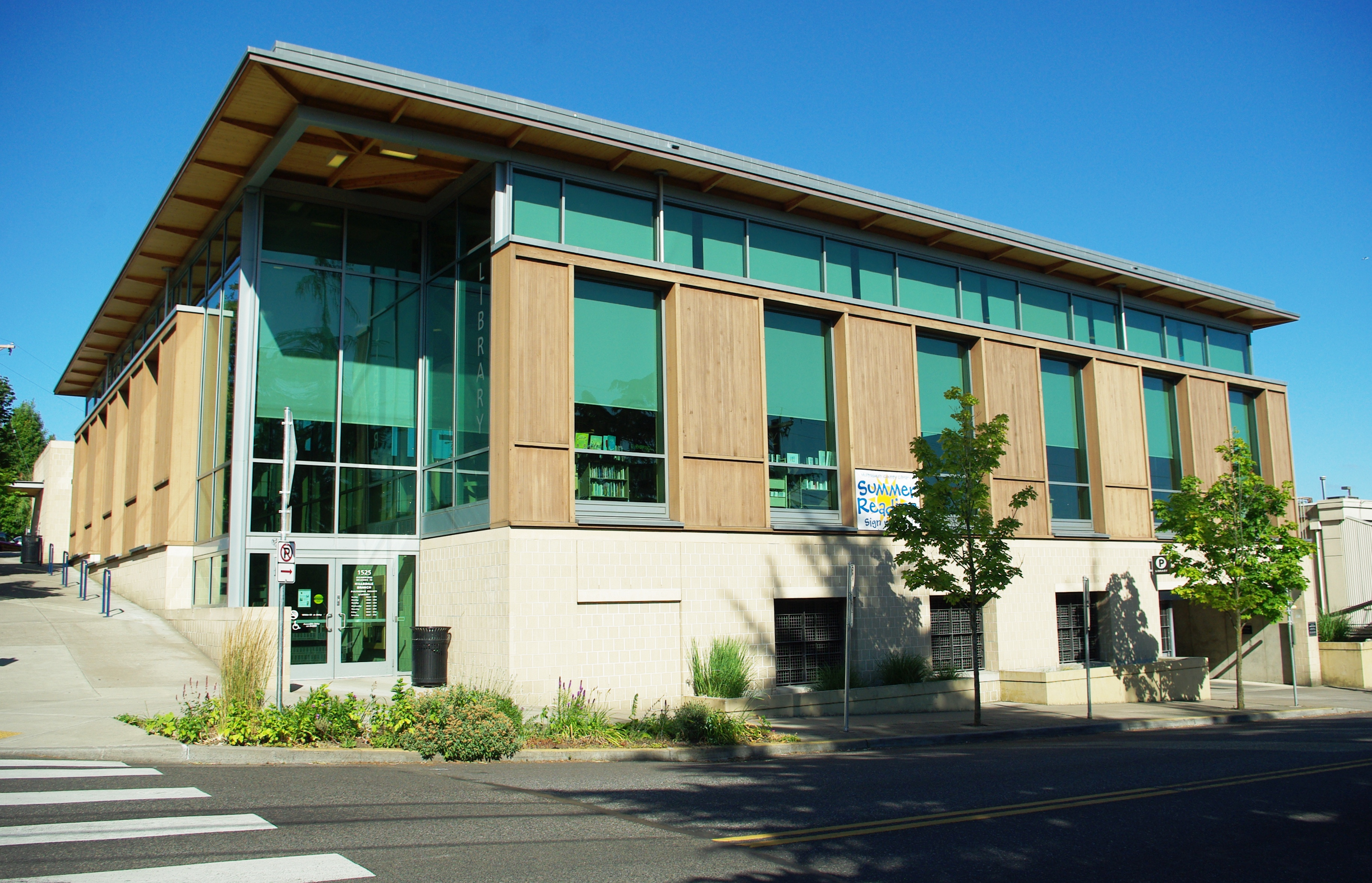
- Library exterior, 2011

- Location within Portland, Oregon

General information
- Location: Hillsdale, 1515 Southwest Sunset Boulevard, Portland, Oregon, United States
- Coordinates: 45°28′47″N 122°41′40″W
- Opened: May 22, 1957
- Renovated: March 8, 2004
- Owner: Multnomah County Library

Technical details
- Floor area: 12,000 square feet (1,100 m^{2})

Design and construction
- Architecture firm: Thomas Hacker and Associates
- Structural engineer: Degenkolb Engineers
- Main contractor: James W. Fowler Co.

Website
- Hillsdale Library

The Hillsdale Library is a branch of the Multnomah County Library, located in Hillsdale, Portland, Oregon. The branch offers the Multnomah County Library catalog of two million books, periodicals and other materials. The original library building at this location opened in 1957 and was replaced by a new building on the same site in 2004. The new library, a green building designed to minimize environmental impacts, has 12,000 square feet (1,100 m^{2}) of floor space and a storage capacity of 75,000 volumes.

== History ==
In 1913, the Multnomah County Library opened a small deposit station in Southwest Portland. It held a collection of 30 to 50 books and was easier for nearby residents to get to than the main library downtown. Later in the same year, a South Portland sub-branch of the library, larger than the deposit station, opened at First and Hooker streets. This sub-branch was replaced in 1921 by a new building, at Second Avenue and Hooker Street, funded by the Carnegie Corporation of New York. After large highways were built through the neighborhood, the South Portland branch served a declining population, and its open days were reduced to three a week in 1940. At the same time, a reading room in Multnomah, another southwest Portland neighborhood, was enlarged to accommodate a growing population.

By 1957, as the populations in the southwest part of the city continued to grow, the sub-branch in Multnomah was closed and a Southwest Hills branch was opened in Hillsdale at 1515 Southwest Sunset Boulevard. Responding to petitions from the community, the library board agreed to change the branch name to Hillsdale Library in 1986. In 1988, voters approved bonds to improve neighborhood libraries, including the Hillsdale branch. After many public discussions, the Multnomah County Commission voted to build a new library on the site of the existing building. Those discussions included a proposal to relocate the library into a mixed-use development. In March 2002, the old building was demolished.

Construction on the new structure began in 2002, and the new Modernist structure, built to reduce its environmental impact, opened in 2004. It was the last of a string of renovations costing $34 million undertaken by the Multnomah County Library system in the early 2000s, which an Oregonian article called "the widest rollout of civic architecture since the creation of Portland's first citywide library system in the 1910s." The new $4.1 million building doubled the size of the library to 12,000 square feet (1,100 m^{2}) and added parking below. Initially, officials hoped to earn Leadership in Energy and Environmental Design (LEED) silver status for the new library, but instead were able to gain gold status in 2004 after the structure was completed. Features of the new building include items such as a 20-foot (6.1 m) high ceiling in the reading room, a tubular steel roof, and 10-square-foot (0.93 m^{2}) skylights.

Thomas Hacker and Associates were the Hillsdale Library's architects, along with all 16 of the other branches redesigned or renovated. James W. Fowler Co. was the general contractor on the new building. The Hillsdale Library has a capacity of 75,000 volumes and has 12,000 square feet (1,100 m^{2}) of floor space.

In 2024, the library closed temporarily for interior renovations funded by a 2020 building bond.

== See also ==
- List of Carnegie libraries in Oregon
