= Portland Public Library (Oregon) =

Public library in Portland, Oregon, US

- 45°31′12″N 122°40′55″W
- Location: Portland, Oregon, United States
- Established: 1891; 134 years ago

Other information
- Website: https://www.portlandlibrary.com/

The Portland Public Library (PPL) was a short-lived but influential institution in Portland, Oregon, United States.

Established in 1891 by a group including former members of the Library Association of Portland (LAP), which had run a library since 1864, the PPL succeeded in offering free service to the public without government involvement for several years. The two organizations merged in 1902, and the new organization, which became known as the Multnomah County Library, offered free, tax supported library services for the first time in Portland. The merger allowed the PPL's records to persist, permitting comparison of the two organizations and their respective roles in establishing the legacy of free public libraries in the Portland area. Notably, the PPL had a high degree of involvement by women, who at times held a majority of the seats on the board of trustees, and who performed fund-raising duties. The PPL is said to have had a more "democratic nature" than the better-established LAP.

Prior to the merger, the two libraries existed harmoniously, serving different constituencies. The PPL was the "poor man's library" and closely adhered to the ideals of the public library movement, while the LAP served a middle-to-upper income clientele.
