= Sellwood-Moreland Library =

Library in Oregon

Sellwood–Moreland Library
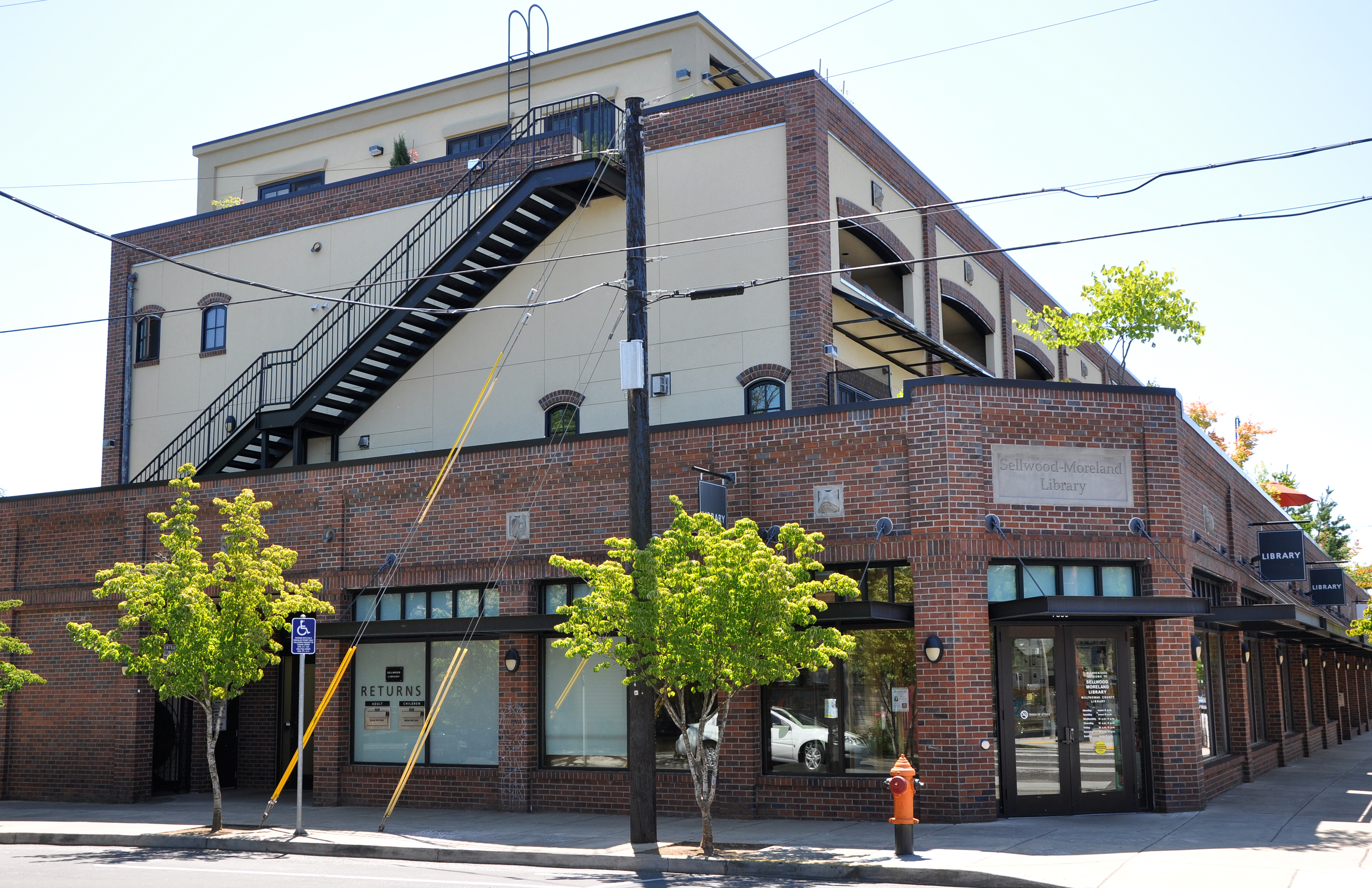
- Exterior in 2013

- Location within Portland, Oregon

General information
- Location: Sellwood, 7860 S.E. 13th Avenue, Portland, Oregon, United States
- Coordinates: 45°28′3.73″N 122°39′10.69″W
- Opened: February 12, 2002
- Owner: Multnomah County Library

Technical details
- Floor area: 4,375 square feet (406.5 m^{2})

Design and construction
- Architecture firm: Waxman & Associates (exterior); Thomas Hacker and Associates (tenant consultant)

Website
- Sellwood-Moreland Library

The Sellwood–Moreland Library is a branch of the Multnomah County Library, in the Sellwood neighborhood of Portland in the U.S. state of Oregon. First established in 1905 as the Sellwood Reading Room, it operated in several Sellwood locations before re-opening in 2002 in a new mixed-use building at S.E. 13th Avenue and Bidwell Street.

== History ==
First established in 1905 as the Sellwood Reading Room, this small library in a storefront opposite Sellwood School was the first public library in Multnomah County aside from the main library in downtown Portland. The reading room's collection, provided by the Portland Library Association, amounted to 150 books. Judged too small for the community's needs, the library was expanded in the same location to 1,000 volumes in 1907, when it was renamed the Sellwood Branch Library.

Two years later, the library was re-located to 570 S.E. Tacoma Avenue, closer to the business district and a (now defunct) streetcar line. In 1915, it was moved again, this time to a rental property at 582 S.E. Nehalem Street, and in 1931 it was moved to 1406 S.E. Nehalem Street. After the owners of the Nehalem Street building sold it, the community decided to finance its own building at S.E. Milwaukie Avenue and Lexington Street. Designed by architect Loyal Lang, the 2,204-square-foot (204.8 m^{2}) library opened on September 30, 1965.

Bonds approved by county voters in 1996 provided money to renovate branch libraries, including Sellwood-Moreland. By then, the existing library had plumbing, mechanical, and other problems, and it lacked the wiring needed to support modern technology. It was overcrowded; designed to hold 6,500 items, it held 31,200. In 2000, the Multnomah County Commissioners agreed to lease space in a mixed-use building to be constructed at S.E. 13th Avenue and Bidwell Street. The old library closed in January 2002, and the new library opened on February 12, 2002. Its floor space amounts to 4,375 square feet (406.5 m^{2}) in a building that includes commercial space and 16 residential condominiums. The old building was sold in 2003 for $210,000.

In 2025, the library closed temporarily for interior renovations and improvements funded by a 2020 building bond..
