= John Sellwood =

American minister

John Sellwood was a pioneer Episcopal minister who settled in the U.S. state of Oregon on a 321-acre (130 ha) donation land claim on the east bank of the Willamette River upstream from Portland.

Sellwood, born in England, was brought up and educated by his mother after the death of his father in 1808. In 1853, he, his mother, and his only brother, James R.W. Sellwood, emigrated to the U.S., settling first in Cincinnati, Ohio, and later in Illinois, where he briefly served as a minister. Emigrating to Oregon in 1856, he was badly wounded during a riot in Panama, where the Sellwoods stayed during part of their journey west. He never fully recovered from his injuries.

Sellwood and his brother, who was also a minister, went to Oregon to assist Thomas Fielding Scott, the Episcopal missionary bishop of Oregon and Washington. Scott, who had arrived in Oregon in the early 1850s, founded a boys' school in Oswego and a girls' school in Milwaukie, both relatively near the Sellwood property.

John Sellwood sold his property in 1882 to the Sellwood Real Estate Company, which began development of the land into the town of Sellwood. Henry Pittock, owner of The Oregonian newspaper in Portland, was the majority stockholder in the real estate company. Incorporated in 1887, the town became part of Portland in 1893 after the state legislature extended the Multnomah County border a bit south and east to allow Portland to assimilate all of Sellwood. The Sellwood post office was established in October 1893 and became the Sellwood-Moreland post office in 1950.

Sellwood died on August 27, 1892. Sellwood Boulevard and Sellwood Road, as well as the Sellwood neighborhood of Portland, are named after him.
