= Midland Library =

Library in Oregon

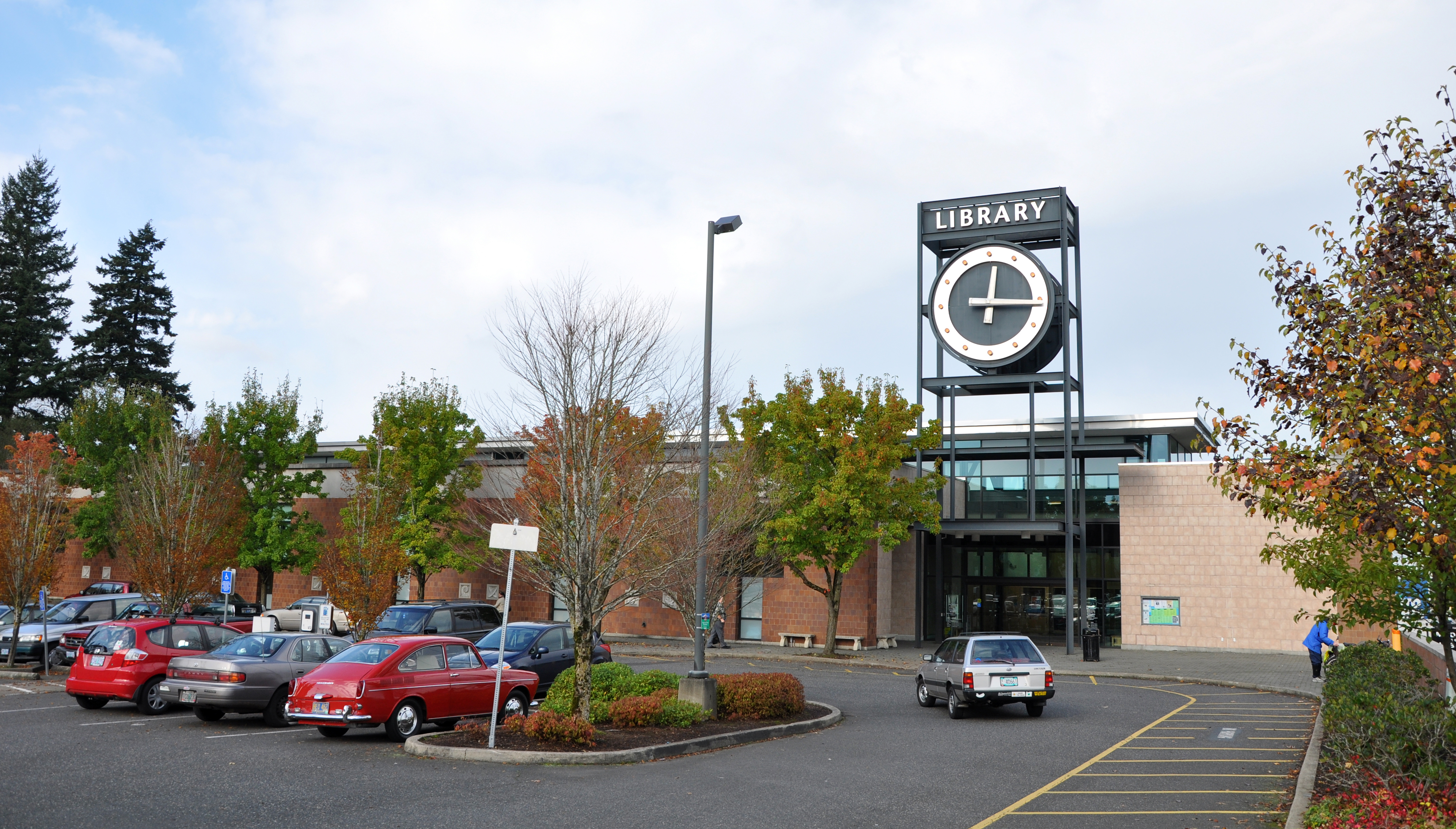
- Clock tower and entrance in 2012

- Location within Portland, Oregon

General information
- Location: 805 S.E. 122nd Avenue, Portland, Oregon, United States
- Coordinates: 45.516703°N 122.537754°W
- Opened: September 16, 1996
- Owner: Multnomah County Library

Technical details
- Floor area: 25,000 square feet (2,300 m^{2})

Design and construction
- Architecture firm: Thomas Hacker and Associates

Website
- Midland Library

The Midland Library is a branch of the Multnomah County Library, in Portland in the U.S. state of Oregon. The branch offers the Multnomah County Library catalog of two million books, periodicals and other materials.

== History ==
Bookmobiles, reading rooms, and small branch libraries provided much of the public library service to Portland neighborhoods in the first half of the 20th century. A library study in 1955 recommended switching to a system of larger branches supported by sub-branches and bookmobiles.

The large Midland branch opened at S.E. 122nd Avenue and S.E. Morrison Street in 1958 and was the second branch in the county system to serve suburban residents. Oregon authors present at its dedication included Stewart Holbrook, Dorothy Johansen, and others. The 5,600-square-foot (520 m^{2}) building cost $90,000; it initially housed 12,000 volumes, with plans to extend the collection to 20,000. The building offered bicycle racks. By the early 1960s, the library floor area had been expanded to 6,580 square feet (611 m^{2}).

Until the 1990 opening of the new Gresham Library building (13 times the size of the building it replaced), the Midland was considered the second busiest in the county system, after Portland's Central Library. In 1993, Multnomah County voters agreed to spend $5.3 million for a new Midland Library building at the same site along S.E. 122nd Avenue. Thomas Hacker and Associates was the architectural firm for the project and Silco Construction the general contractor. The new library opened on September 16, 1996. It has a floor area of 25,000 square feet (2,300 m^{2}) and can hold up to 150,000 books.

In 2022, the library closed temporarily for interior renovations and additions funded by a 2020 building bond. It reopened in 2024.

== See also ==
- History of libraries
- Library science
