= Sellwood-Moreland, Portland, Oregon =

Sellwood-Moreland
- Neighborhood
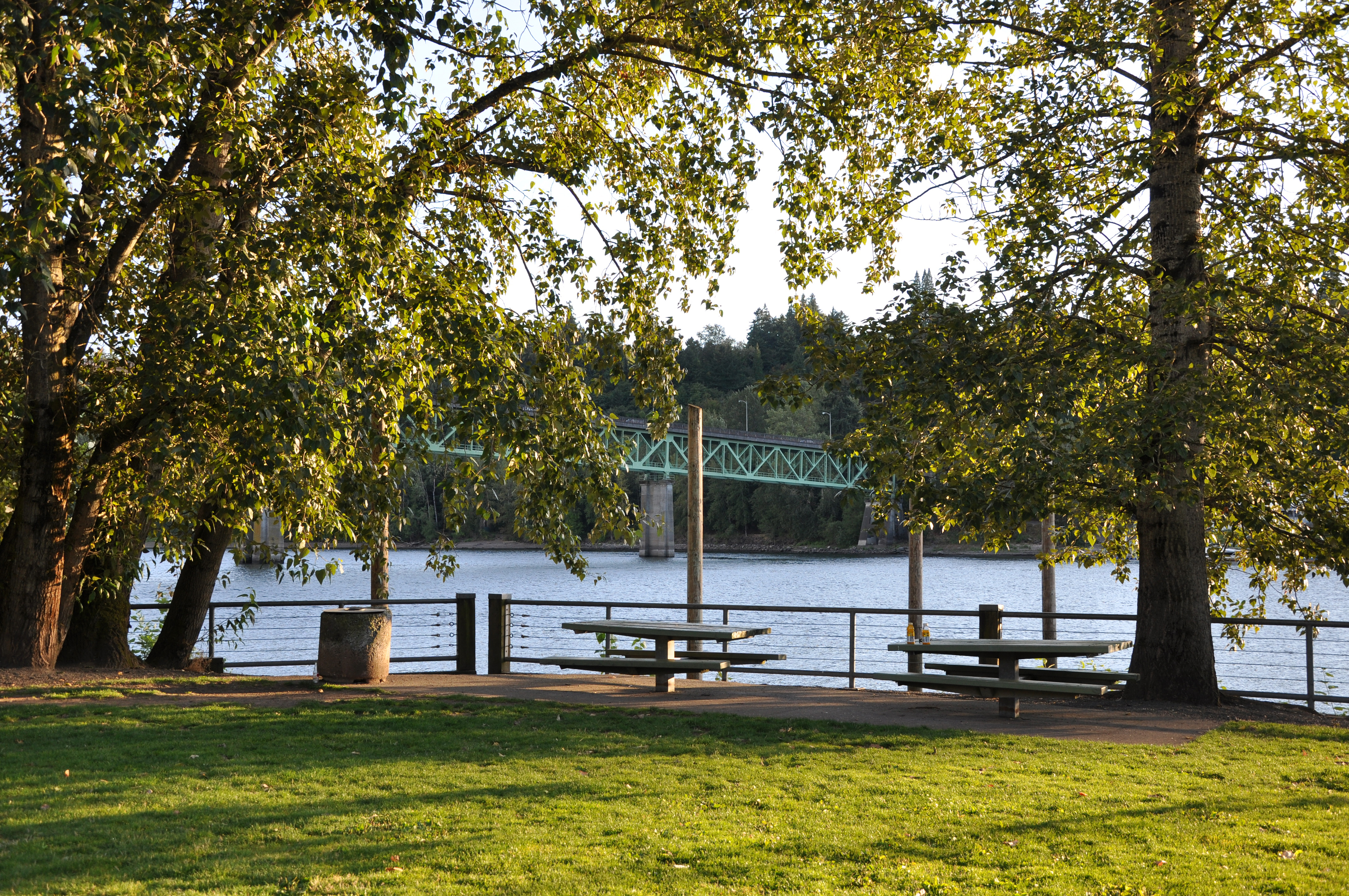
- Sellwood Park along the Willamette River
- Location in Portland
- Coordinates: 45°27′54″N 122°39′00″W
- Country: United States
- State: Oregon
- City: Portland

Government
  - Association: Sellwood Moreland Improvement League (SMILE)
  - Coalition: Southeast Uplift

Area
  - Total: 1.81 sq mi (4.68 km^{2})

Population (2000)
  - Total: 10,475
  - Density: 5,800/sq mi (2,240/km^{2})

Housing
  - No. of households: 5159
  - Occupancy rate: 96% occupied
  - Owner-occupied: 2682 households (52%)
  - Renting: 2477 households (48%)
  - Avg. household size: 2.03 persons

Sellwood-Moreland is a neighborhood on a bluff overlooking the Willamette River in Southeast Portland, Oregon, bordering Brooklyn to the north, Eastmoreland to the east, and the city of Milwaukie to the south. The neighborhood is linked to Southwest Portland across the Willamette River by the Sellwood Bridge, the southernmost of Portland's bridges.

== History ==
Sellwood originated as an independent city and as a rival of nearby early Portland on the 1,320-acre (5.3 km^{2}) Donation Land Claim of Reverend John Sellwood, who sold the claim in 1882 to the Sellwood Real Estate Company. The town of Sellwood was incorporated by the Oregon Legislative Assembly on February 25, 1889. It was annexed by Portland in 1893.

== Features ==
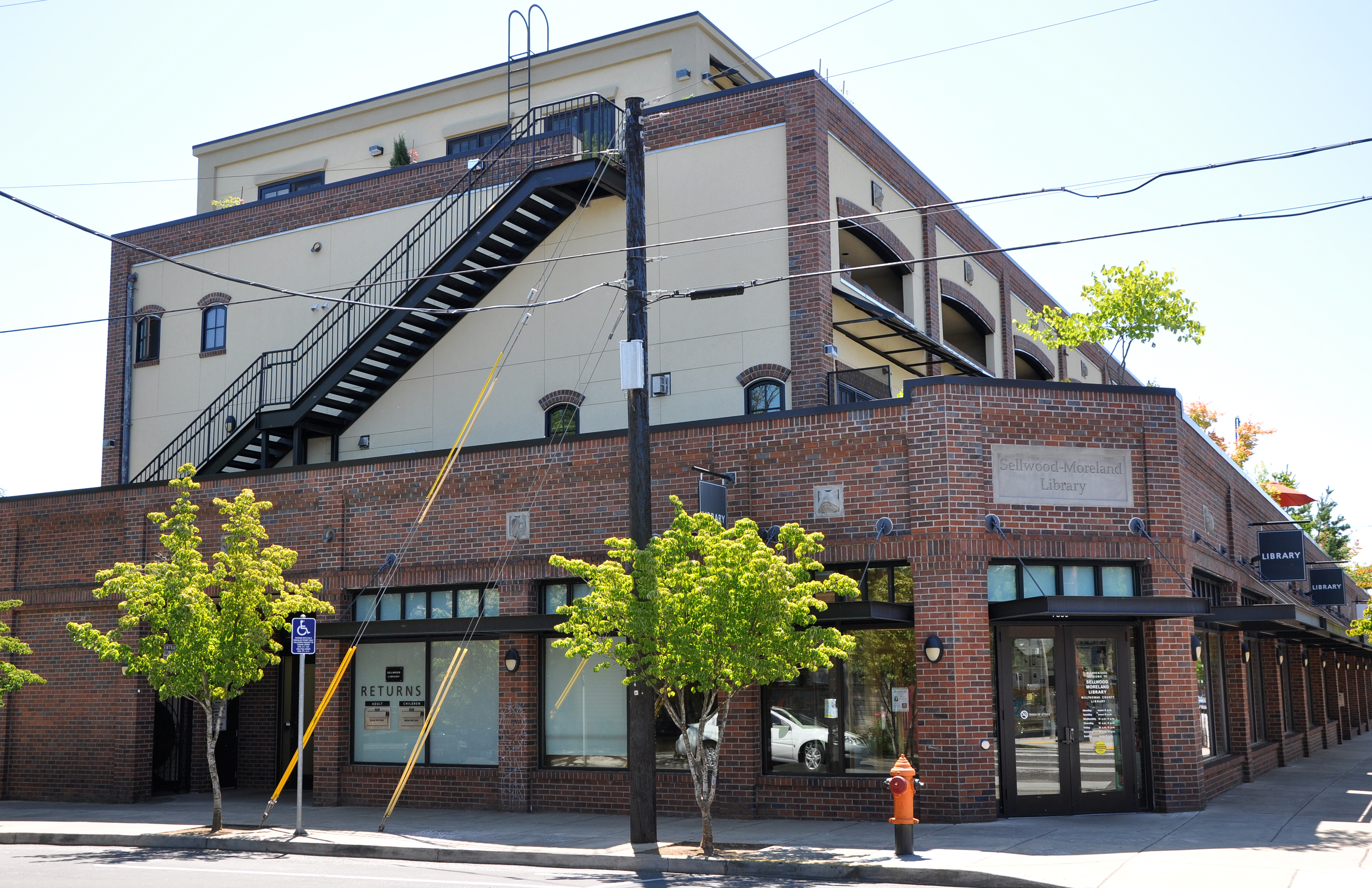
The Sellwood-Moreland Library

Sellwood has an amusement park named Oaks Park along the river. A bike trail next to railroad tracks above the river is accessible from Sellwood, and links Milwaukie and downtown Portland. The Oaks Bottom Wildlife Refuge was established in 1988 and has allowed the preservation and protection of numerous species. Walking trails go through the park, traversing woods, meadow and marshland.

Milwaukie Avenue and SE 13th Avenue are the locations of many restaurants, Moreland Theater, specialty retail and neighborhood stores, upscale antique shops, a middle school, and other stores.

Education is provided by the Portland Public School District. Its zoned schools are either Llewelyn or Duniway Elementary, Sellwood Middle School, and Cleveland High School.
