= Belmont Library =

Multnomah County Library branch in Portland, Oregon, U.S.

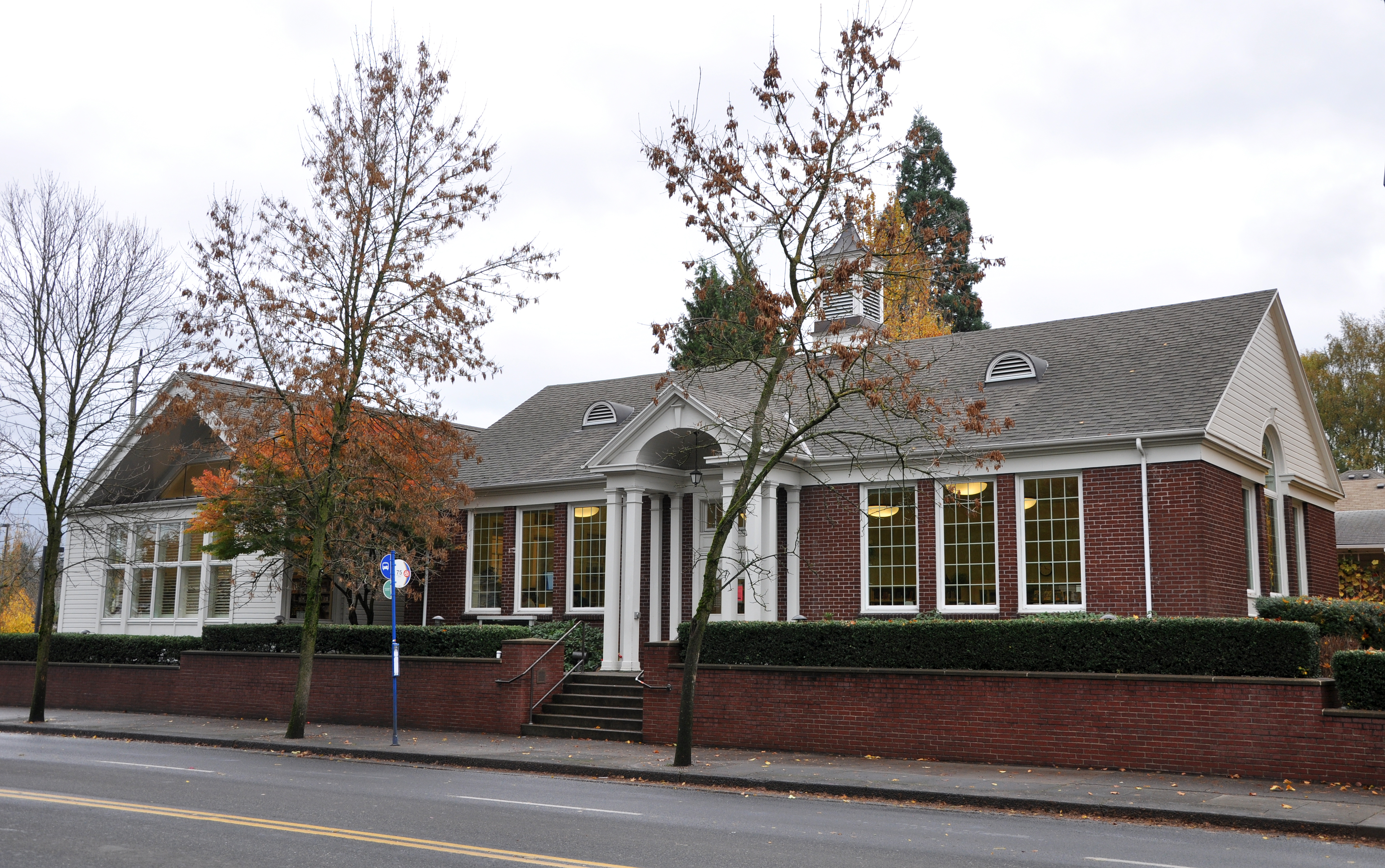
- Library exterior in 2012

- Location within Portland, Oregon

General information
- Location: Belmont, 1038 SE César E. Chávez Blvd., Portland, Oregon, United States
- Coordinates: 45.515166°N 122.622786°W
- Opened: March 7, 1924
- Owner: Multnomah County Library

Technical details
- Floor area: 5,954 square feet (553.1 m^{2})

Design and construction
- Architect: Jamieson Parker
- Main contractor: W. C. Moore

Renovating team
- Architects: Thomas Hacker and Associates
- Renovating firm: Andersen Construction

Website
- Belmont Library

The Belmont Library is a branch of the Multnomah County Library, located in Belmont, Portland, Oregon. The original library building opened in 1924 and was expanded in 1937 with the addition of a children's room. The brick building had small round windows and large oak tables. Renovations during 1999–2000 nearly doubled the library's capacity.

The branch offers the Multnomah County Library catalog of two million books, periodicals and other materials. The Belmont Library features a 24-person capacity meeting room for hosting community events at no charge on a first come, first served basis. A decorative quilt made by residents of the Sunnyside neighborhood is also housed within the building.

== History ==
In 1923, residents of the Belmont and Hawthorne areas of southeast Portland raised funds to construct a library building at East 39th Avenue and Taylor Street (now S.E. César E. Chávez Blvd. and S.E. Taylor Street). The Library Association of Portland paid for the building plans. According to the association president, the Belmont effort was one of the first in Portland during which library users raised funds to erect a branch library building in their own neighborhood. The neighborhood presented the building debt-free to the association in early 1924, and the 2,924-square-foot (271.6 m^{2}) library opened on March 7, 1924.

Federal funds through the Works Progress Administration paid for expansion of the library in 1937. The addition of a children's room and staff work areas increased the building's floor area to 3,554 square feet (330.2 m^{2}). Even so, circulation at the library continued to grow until the floor area was considered inadequate. In 1996, voters approved a bond measure to renovate the county's libraries and to pay special attention to four of them, including Belmont. The branch closed in June 1999 for remodeling and reopened in March 2000. The resulting expansion added 2,400 square feet (220 m^{2}) to the library's floor area, bringing the total area to 5,954 square feet (553.1 m^{2}). The renovated library can hold up to 20,000 volumes. Self-checkout stations and security gates were installed in 2011 during a minor renovation.

Over the years the library has hosted numerous activities, including a children's jamboree, knitting groups, lectures and readings. The building also serves as a ballot drop-off site during elections.

In 2023 the library averaged 2,300 items on hold per month, more than any other branch in the Multnomah County Library system. As of 2025, the library undergoing renovations to expand interior space with community rooms, a teenager area, and accessibility improvements, which were on schedule to finish by summer 2026. The area more than doubled from 6,000 square feet (560 m^{2}) to 15,000 square feet (1,400 m^{2}). The library reopened on August 15, 2026.

== See also ==
- List of Carnegie libraries in Oregon
