= East County Library =

Library in Oregon

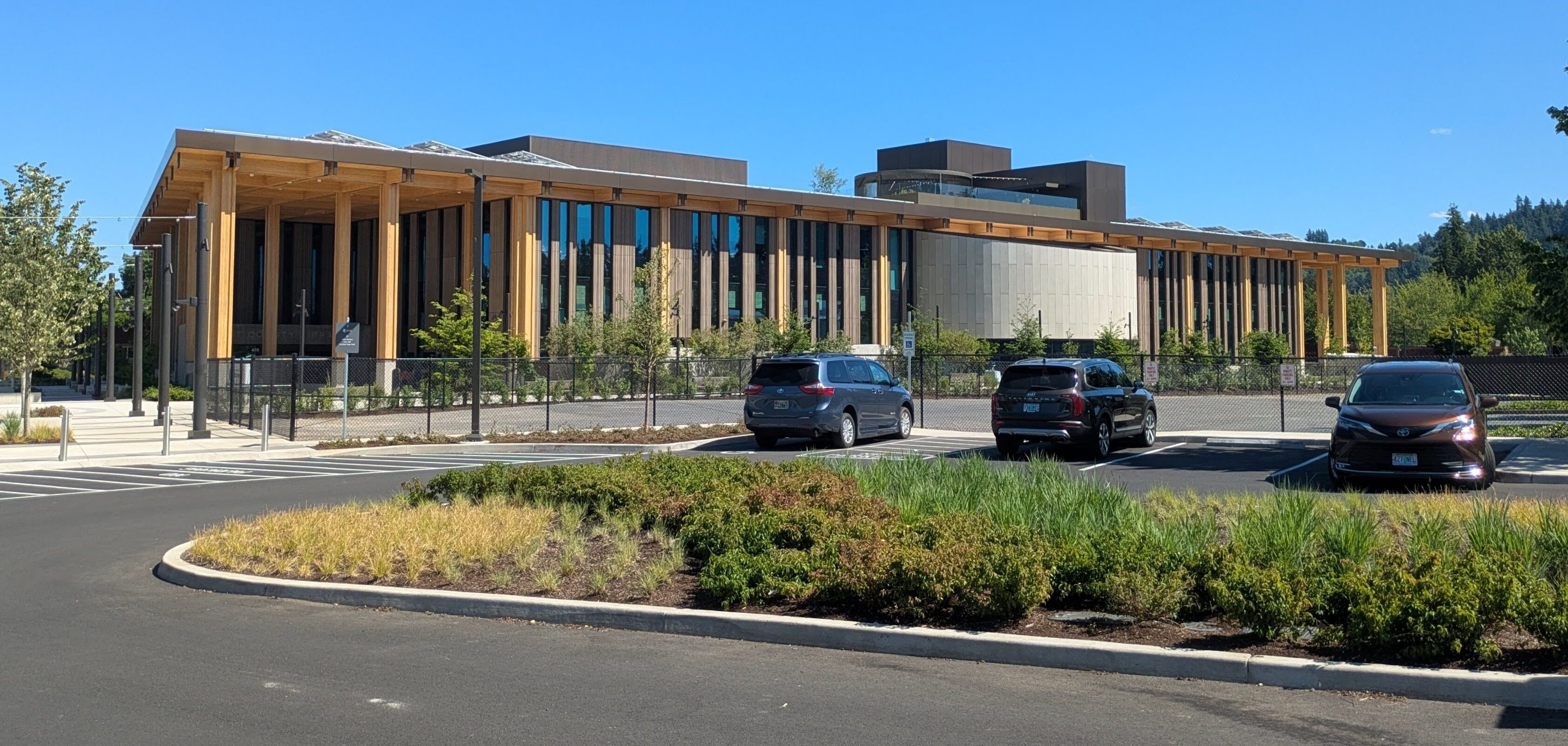
- East County Library in 2026

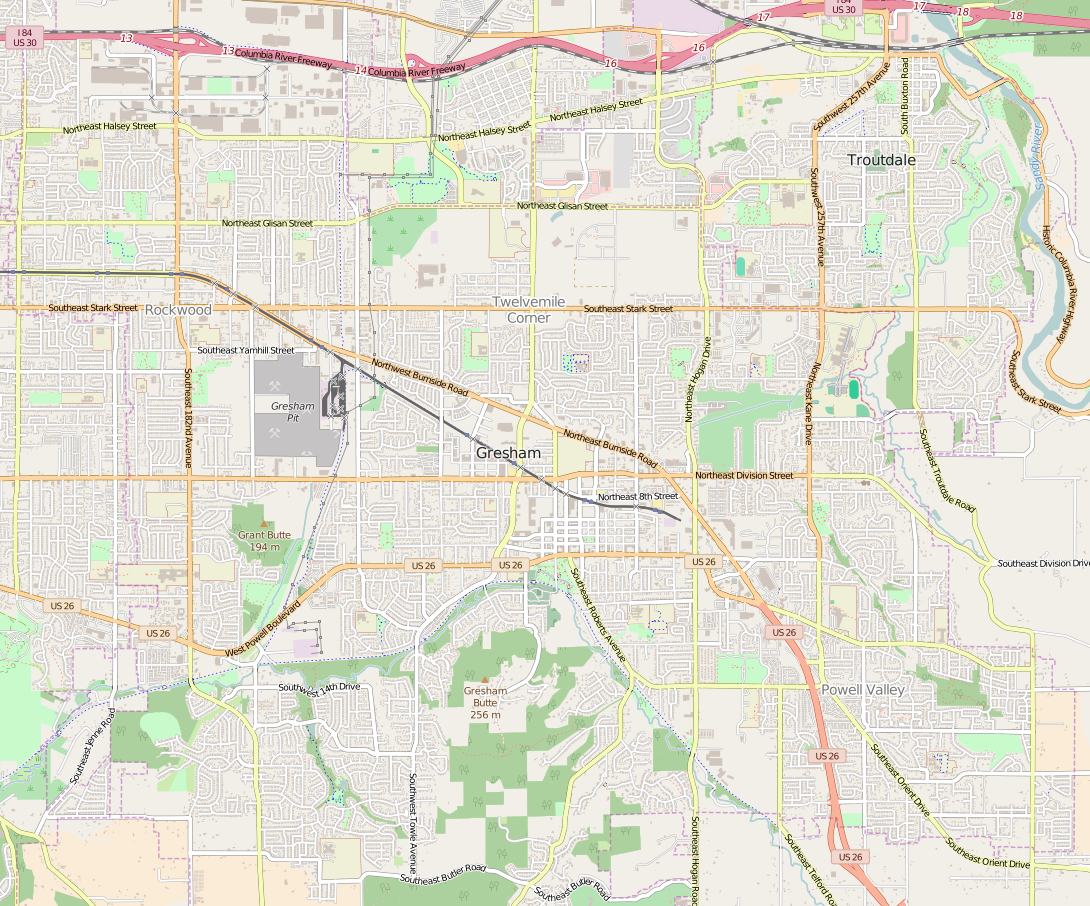
- Location within Gresham OR
- Former names: Gresham Library

General information
- Location: Gresham, Oregon, United States
- Coordinates: 45°30′18″N 122°26′10″W
- Opened: January 9, 1990
- Renovated: May 16, 2026
- Owner: Multnomah County Library

Technical details
- Floor area: 95,000 square feet (8,800 m^{2})

Design and construction
- Architecture firm: Holst Architecture
- Main contractor: Fortis Construction, Inc.

Website
- Gresham Library

The East County Library, formerly the Gresham Library or Gresham Regional Library, is a branch of the Multnomah County Library in Gresham in the U.S. state of Oregon. The branch offers the Multnomah County Library catalog of two million books, periodicals and other materials. The branch opened in a new building in May 2026.

== History ==
Gresham's first library was a Carnegie library, located in 1913 Tudor style building at 410 N. Main Street. After it was replaced by the second library, the building was purchased by the Gresham Historical Society, which turned it into a museum as well as housing its main headquarters there.

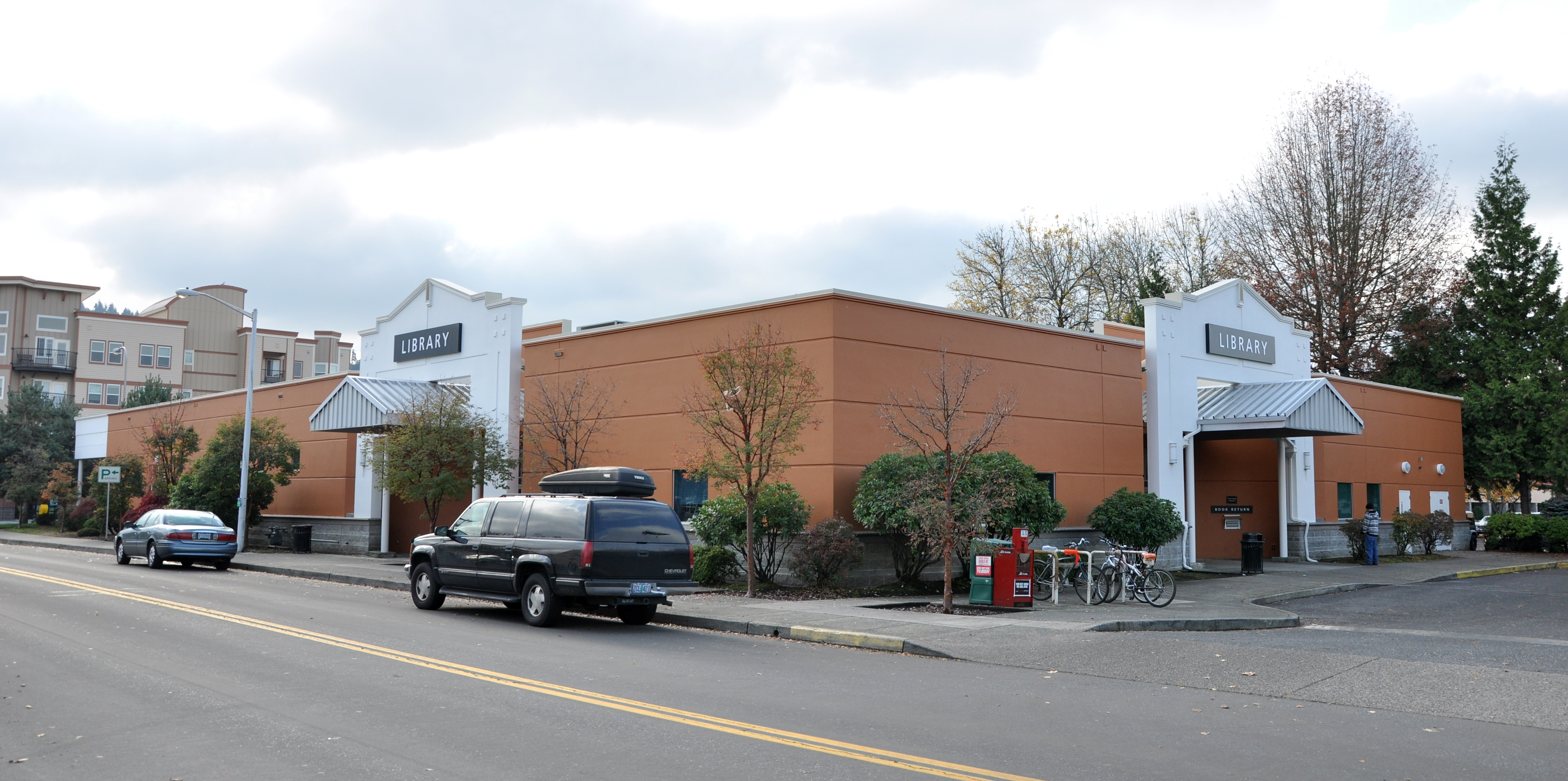
Gresham Library's former building in 2012

In 1989, construction was started on a building that would replace the Carnegie library. The new Gresham Library opened in January 1990, paid for by a $2.1 million fund-raising campaign designed in part by then-Governor Neil Goldschmidt. Following the levy, three attempts to buy suitable property that could be developed within the $1.7 million approved had failed by mid-1988, leading to the consideration of several more expensive options.

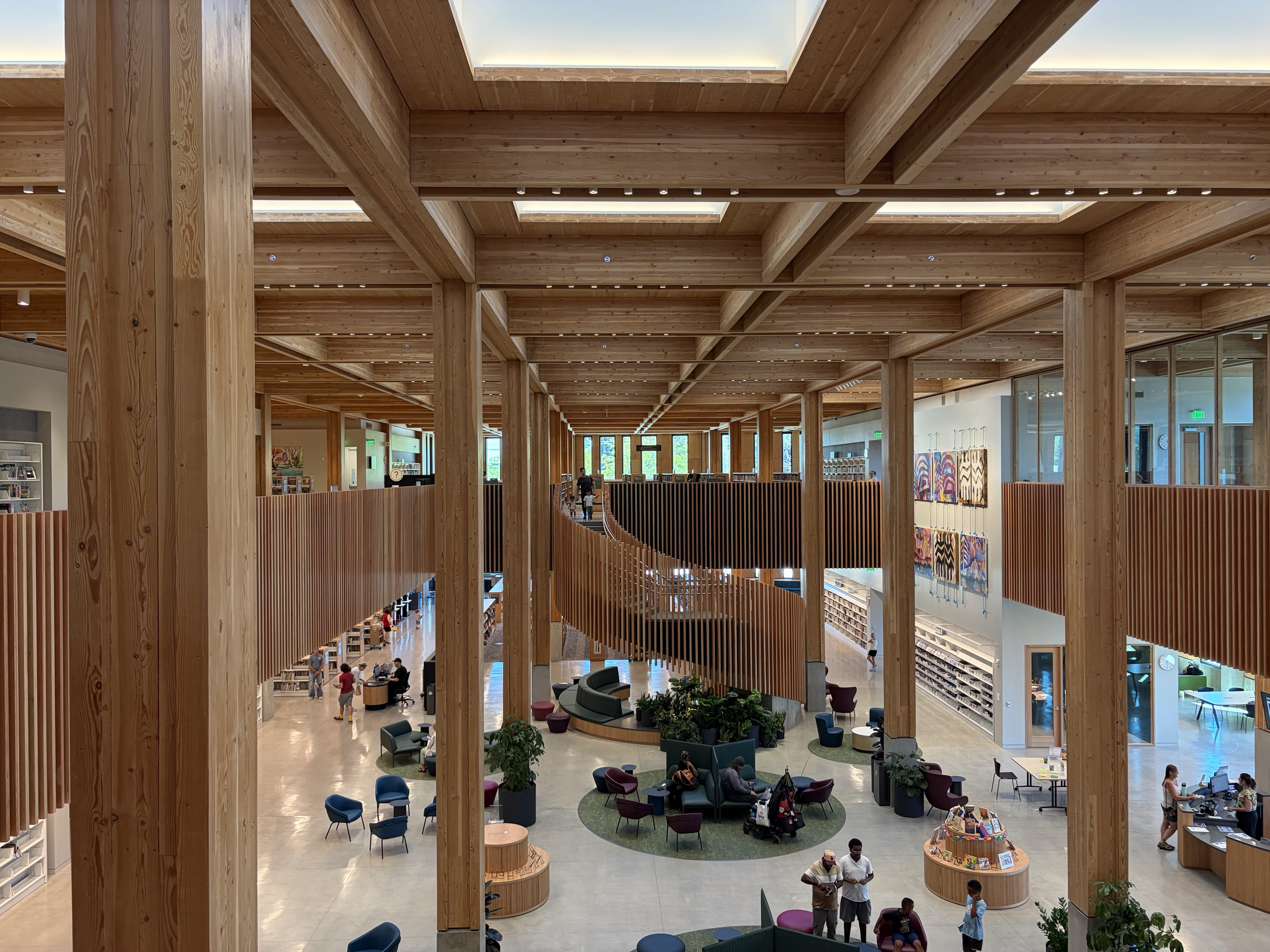
Interior of the new library in 2026

This building was 13 times the size of the original library, and was designed as a "superbranch" to "usher in a new era in library services in both Gresham and the entire county system." With space for 75,000 volumes, the 20,000-square-foot (1,900 m^{2}) library building was designed as the Multnomah County system's second-largest, behind Portland's Central Library. New amenities in this library included a computer lab/media center, a community room, a teen study area, a children's room, a conference room, skylights, and a tower to help it blend in with the surrounding shopping center.

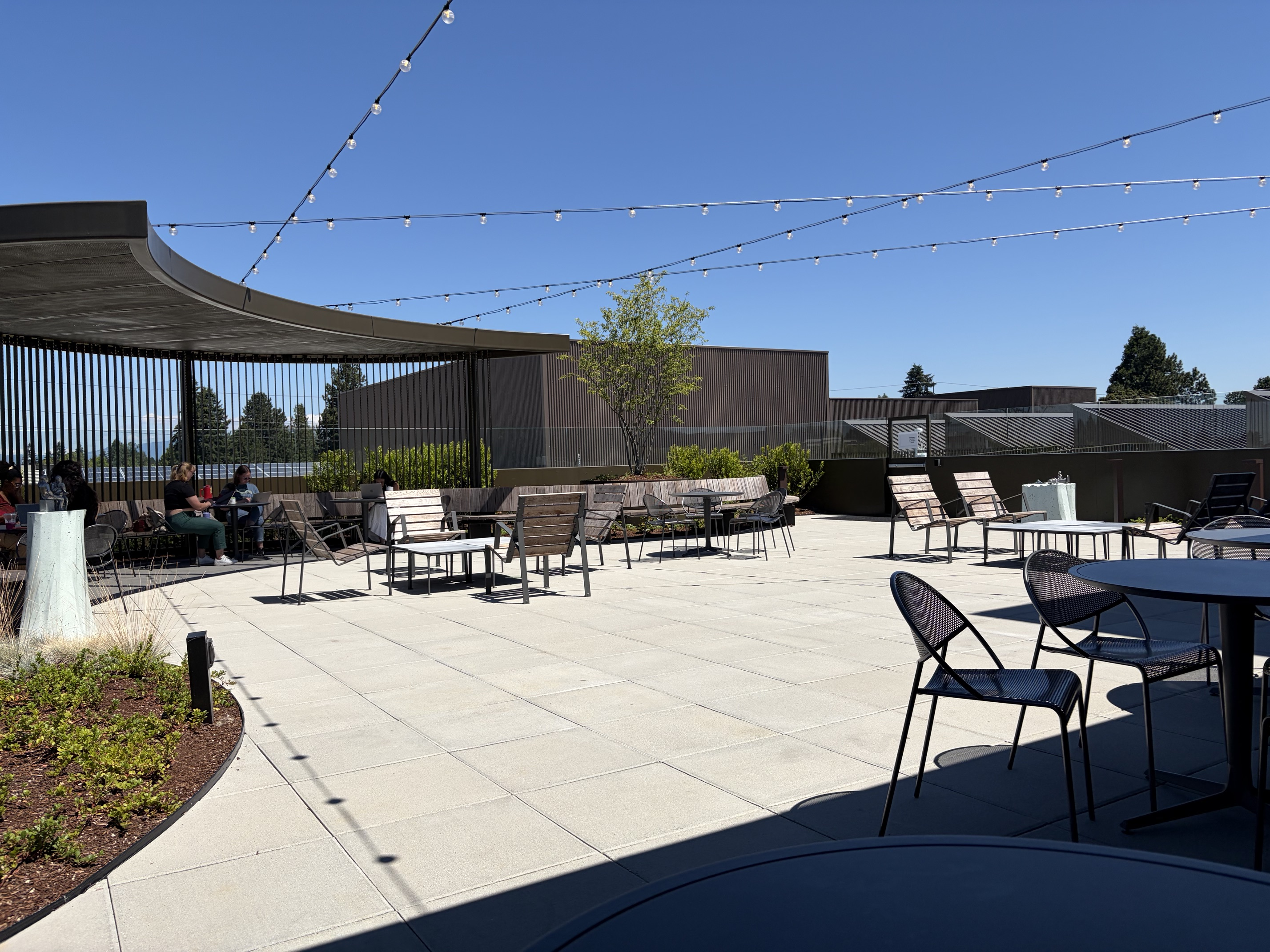
The new library's rooftop terrace in 2026

In 2020, voters passed a bond of $387 million to "expand and modernize" Multnomah County libraries. Around $126 million was directed to the construction of a large, central library to serve Gresham and the surrounding areas. It would be around 95,000 square feet, similar in size to Portland's Central Library. The land was purchased by TriMet and was chosen for its proximity to the Gresham Central Transit Center. Ground was broken on July 12, 2023. Gresham Library closed on March 27, 2026 to move materials to the new library, which opened on May 16, 2026.

== Details and amenities ==
East County Library was designed by lead architect firm Holst Architecture and was assisted in the design development phase by Adjaye Associates. It was inspired by Native architecture and was built to reflect the landscape and forests of the Pacific Northwest. Its primary material is wood, with its structure constructed out of mass timber (as well as concrete), and glulam beams and CLT panels were also used.
