= Oregon Route 224 =

State highway in Clackamas County, Oregon, US

Oregon Route 224
- Route 224 highlighted in red

Route information
- Maintained by ODOT
- Length: 49.12 mi (79.05 km)

Major junctions
- West end: OR 99E in Milwaukie
- OR 213 in Clackamas; I-205 in Clackamas; OR 212 in Happy Valley; OR 211 in Estacada
- East end: FH 46 / FH 57 in Ripplebrook

Location
- Country: United States
- State: Oregon
- County: Clackamas

Highway system
- Oregon Highways; Interstate; US; State; Named; Scenic
← OR 223	→ OR 225

Oregon Route 224 is a state highway which runs through some of Portland's southeastern suburbs and ends in the Cascades.

== Route description ==
The northwestern terminus is an interchange with OR 99E in Milwaukie, a suburb of Portland. It continues east as the Milwaukie Expressway, but is formally part of the Clackamas Highway No. 171 (see Oregon highways and routes). After crossing Interstate 205 in Clackamas, it becomes the Sunrise Expressway for about two miles. Then, the highway continues east as a four-lane arterial, resuming its designation as the Clackamas Highway, and which it shares with OR 212. East of Clackamas, OR 224 splits off OR 212, and continues south as the Clackamas Highway, passing through hilly farmland. About eight miles (13 km) north of Estacada, it overlaps OR 211. On the eastern edge of Estacada, OR 224 separates from OR 211, and heads southeast into the Mount Hood National Forest, here you are in the mountains heading to the small community of Ripplebrook, its southeastern terminus, where state highway maintenance ends. Drivers may continue along the paved United States Forest Service Road 46 to OR 22 in Detroit, though snow makes the road impassable approximately early November through early May. USFS Road 46 was formerly signed as a portion of OR 224, but was never a state-maintained highway.

== History ==
This is the second route in Oregon with the designation 224. There was an earlier version of OR 224 connecting US 99W (modern Oregon Route 99W) 3 miles (5 km) south of Monmouth to Oregon Route 223 near Lewisville following today's Elkins Rd. In those days, Oregon Route 223 followed today's Airlie Rd and Maple Grove Rd between Falls City and Pedee). This incarnation of OR 224 existed from the inception of the Oregon Route System in 1932 until sometime between 1942 and 1944.

The Clackamas Highway was realigned onto a section of I-205 in 1971.

The easternmost 19 miles (31 km) of OR 224 in Mount Hood National Forest was closed to traffic during the 2020 Labor Day wildfires, which damaged pavement, guardrails, and nearby trees. It is reopened to traffic on May 1, 2022, 19 months after its closure.

=== Sunrise Expressway ===
The Sunrise Expressway (known as Sunrise Corridor during construction) is a limited-access highway in Clackamas. It serves as an extension of the Milwaukie Expressway portion of OR 224. Planning for the expressway started in the 1980s. Plans weren't approved until 2010, with construction starting in 2013. Costing $130 million, the expressway opened on July 1, 2016. A multi-use path for use by bicyclists and pedestrians was constructed along the highway. It is the newest highway constructed in the Portland metropolitan area since OR 213 bypassed Oregon City in 1989.

== Major intersections ==
Milepoints are as reported by ODOT and do not necessarily reflect current mileage. Z indicates overlapping mileage due to construction longer than established route, and – indicates negative mileage behind established beginning point. Segments that are locally maintained may be omitted. For routes traversing multiple named state highways, each milepoint is preceded by the corresponding state highway number. The entire route is in Clackamas County.

Location	Milepoint	Destinations	Notes
Milwaukie	171 0.11	OR 99E – Portland, Oregon City	West end of limited-access
Milwaukie	171 2.42	Lake Road, Harmony Road	
Clackamas	171 3.88	I-205 / OR 213 – Oregon City, Portland	
Happy Valley	75 6.26 171 6.56	OR 212 west – Oregon City	East end of limited-access; west end of OR 212 overlap
Damascus	171 8.19	OR 212 east to US 26 – Damascus, Mount Hood	East end of OR 212 overlap
Eagle Creek	171 17.92	OR 211 north – Sandy, Mount Hood	West end of OR 211 overlap
Estacada	171 23.36	OR 211 south – Molalla, Woodburn	East end of OR 211 overlap
Ripplebrook	171 49.97	FH 46 / FH 57	
1.000 mi = 1.609 km; 1.000 km = 0.621 mi: Concurrency terminus
