= Oregon Iron Works Sea Scout =

American unmanned seaplane

The Oregon Iron Works Sea Scout is an unmanned seaplane developed by Oregon Iron Works in Clackamas, Oregon and Geneva Aerospace of Carrollton, Texas for the United States Navy. The Sea Scout was developed from the Geneva Aerospace Dakota UAV as part of a $497,000 Vought Aircraft Industries study in 2005, which was funded by DARPA to convert the Dakota UAV for water-borne operations.

The Sea Scout's first flight was on May 30, 2006, and is the first auto-landing of a seaplane in the United States.
