= Franklin W. Farrer House =

Historic building in Portland, Oregon, U.S.

- U.S. National Register of Historic Places
- Portland Historic Landmark
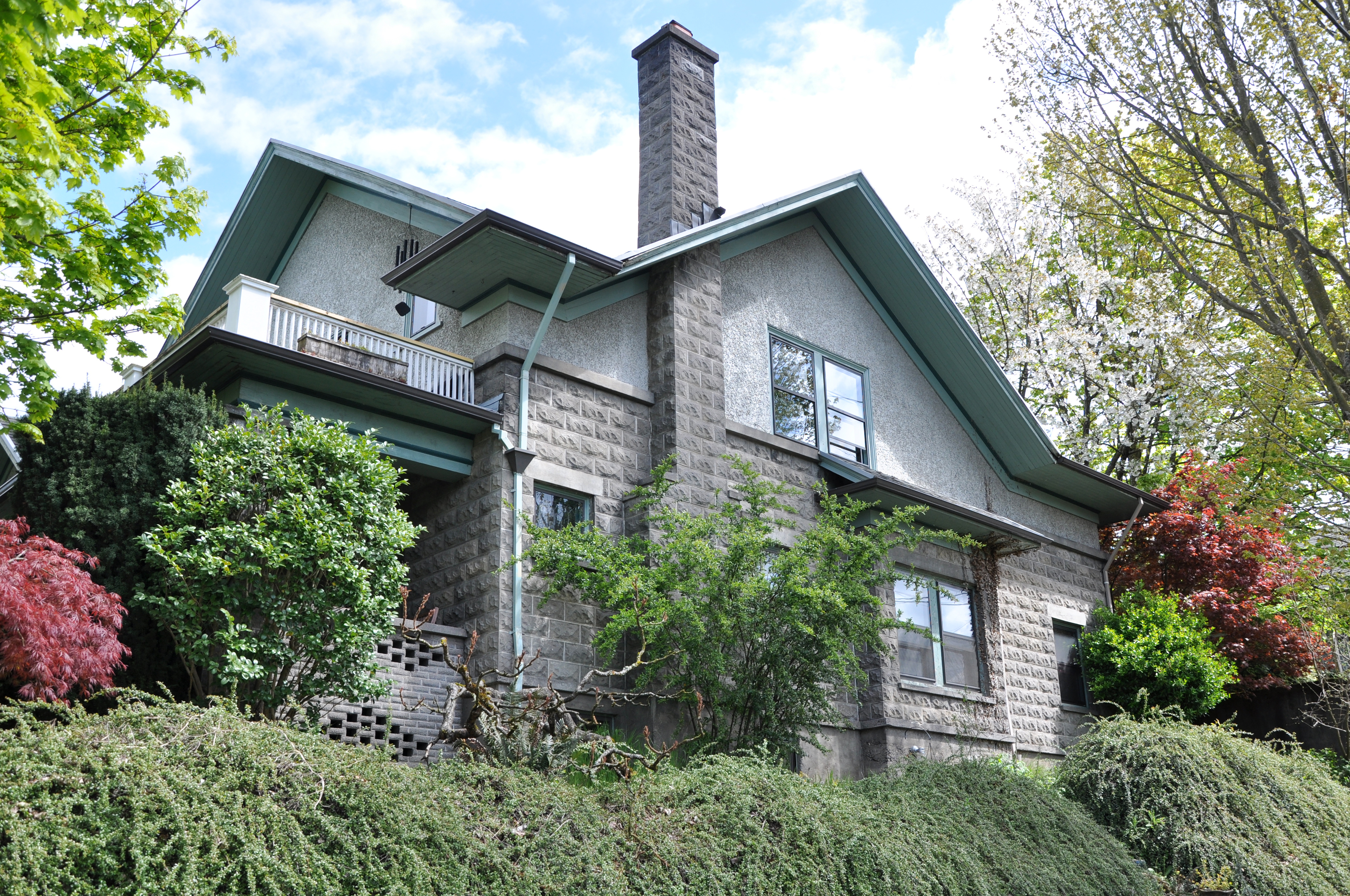
- Side view, looking east, in 2011
- Location: 2706 SE Yamhill Street; Portland, Oregon
- Coordinates: 45°30′56″N 122°38′17″W
- Built: 1914
- Architectural style: Craftsman
- NRHP reference No.: 89000093
- Added to NRHP: March 8, 1989

The Franklin W. Farrer House in southeast Portland in the U.S. state of Oregon is a two-story dwelling listed on the National Register of Historic Places. An American Craftsman structure built in 1914, it was added to the register in 1989.

The interior of the house, originally a single-family dwelling, has been converted to two apartments, one on each floor. The house is locally unusual in its use of cast stone as a homebuilding material. Other notable features include elements of Prairie School architecture such as a low-pitched gable roof, an offset main entrance, exaggerated eave overhangs, and a strong emphasis on horizontal lines.

Farrer was the original owner. Born in 1867 in Minnesota, he moved in infancy to Damascus, Oregon, with his parents. In 1902, he began work for the United States Post Office Department in Portland, for which he delivered mail for 30 years. He occupied the house until his death in 1961.

== See also ==
- National Register of Historic Places listings in Southeast Portland, Oregon
