= Oregon Route 212 =

State highway in Clackamas County, Oregon, US

Oregon Route 212
- Route 212 highlighted in red

Route information
- Maintained by ODOT
- Existed: 1935–present

Major junctions
- West end: I-205 / OR 213 in Clackamas
- OR 224 in Happy Valley
- East end: US 26 near Boring

Location
- Country: United States
- State: Oregon
- County: Clackamas

Highway system
- Oregon Highways; Interstate; US; State; Named; Scenic
← OR 211	→ OR 213

Oregon Route 212 is an Oregon state highway that serves the eastern Portland metro area. It is an east–west route, running between Boring and Clackamas.

== Route description ==
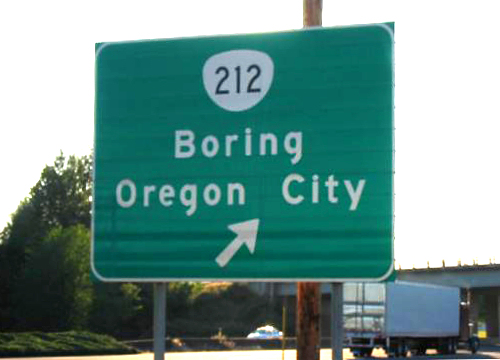
"Boring/Oregon City" sign at OR 212/US 26 interchange

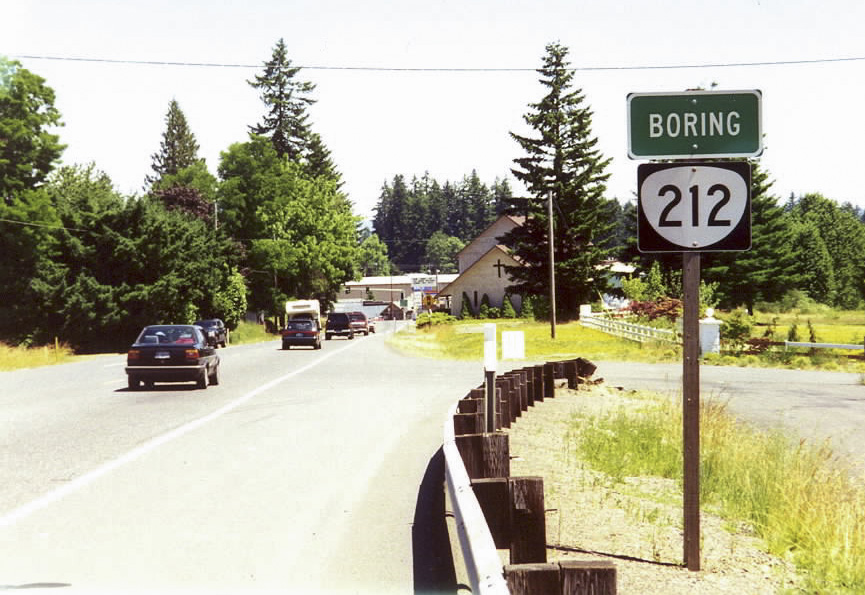
Road sign on Oregon Route 212

OR 212 begins at Interstate 205 and OR 213 in Clackamas and heads east as a four lane highway. This section of OR 212 is part of the Clackamas Highway No. 171. The route then intersects with OR 224 and remains concurrent with it for about 1.6 miles (2.6 km). The highway then condenses down to two lanes and continues east heading toward Damascus. This section of OR 212 is the Clackamas-Boring Highway No. 174 (see Oregon highways and routes). Along the way, there are numerous intersections with backroads that lead to Gresham, Portland's biggest eastern suburb. The sides of this route are covered in farms and berry fields. It then enters the town of Boring, remaining as a two lane road and reaches its eastern terminus at an interchange with US 26, northwest of Sandy.

== History ==
A previous alignment through Boring ran due west onto Fireman Way, curving south onto 272nd.

Two junctions with 257th Ave give away an old alignment. OR 212 traveled due west on the eastern junction with 257th, curving south to meet the western junction.

Armstrong Circle at 172nd is a previous alignment.

Before the construction of I-205, OR 212 continued west on a shared alignment with OR 213 to Oregon City. There, it crossed the Willamette River into West Linn and continued west to Tualatin where it eventually terminated at an intersection with OR 99W. This section replaced the original Oregon Route 244, but was eventually decommissioned after I-205 was completed; however the entire route can still be driven (other than a now-closed bridge across the Clackamas River which used to connect Oregon City with Gladstone, Oregon).

Before US 26 was rerouted, it used to run on Orient Drive. OR 212 traveled this brief segment of Compton Road before the US 26 realignment shortened it.

== Major intersections ==
Milepoints are as reported by ODOT and do not necessarily reflect current mileage. Z indicates overlapping mileage due to construction longer than established route, and – indicates negative mileage behind established beginning point. Segments that are locally maintained may be omitted. For routes traversing multiple named state highways, each milepoint is preceded by the corresponding state highway number. The entire route is in Clackamas County.

Location	Milepoint	Destinations	Notes
Clackamas	171 Z4.93	I-205 / OR 213 – Oregon City, Portland	I-205 exit 12 northbound/12A southbound.
Happy Valley	171 6.56	OR 224 west to I-205 north – Milwaukie	Western end of OR 224 overlap
Damascus	171 8.19 174 0.03	OR 224 east – Carver, Estacada	Eastern end of OR 224 overlap
	174 8.87	US 26 – Gresham, Portland, Sandy, Mount Hood	Interchange
1.000 mi = 1.609 km; 1.000 km = 0.621 mi: Concurrency terminus
