= Gateway Green =

Public park in Portland, Oregon, U.S.

- Location within Portland, Oregon
- Location: Portland, Oregon
- Coordinates: 45.537°N 122.562°W
- Area: 25 acres (10 ha)

Gateway Green is a 25 acres (10 ha) park in northeast Portland, Oregon, known for catering to off-road cyclists.

It is located between Interstate 205 and Interstate 84 on the former site of the Rocky Butte county jail. The park opened June 2017, but construction to further expand the park began March 2020 is expected to be complete by November 2020.
