= Oregon Route 213 =

State highway in northwestern Oregon, US

Oregon Route 213
- Route 213 highlighted in red

Route information
- Maintained by ODOT
- Length: 55.66 mi (89.58 km)

Major junctions
- South end: I-5 in Salem
- OR 214 in Silverton; OR 211 near Molalla; I-205 near Oregon City; OR 212 in Clackamas; I-205 in Clackamas; OR 224 in Clackamas
- North end: SE Clatsop Street in Portland

Location
- Country: United States
- State: Oregon
- Counties: Clackamas, Marion, Multnomah

Highway system
- Oregon Highways; Interstate; US; State; Named; Scenic
← OR 212	→ OR 214

Oregon Route 213 (OR 213) is an Oregon state highway that serves the eastern Willamette Valley between Portland and Salem. It is a north–south route. The route (except for its southernmost segment) is known as the Cascade Highway, though specific segments are generally better known by more localized names.

== Route description ==
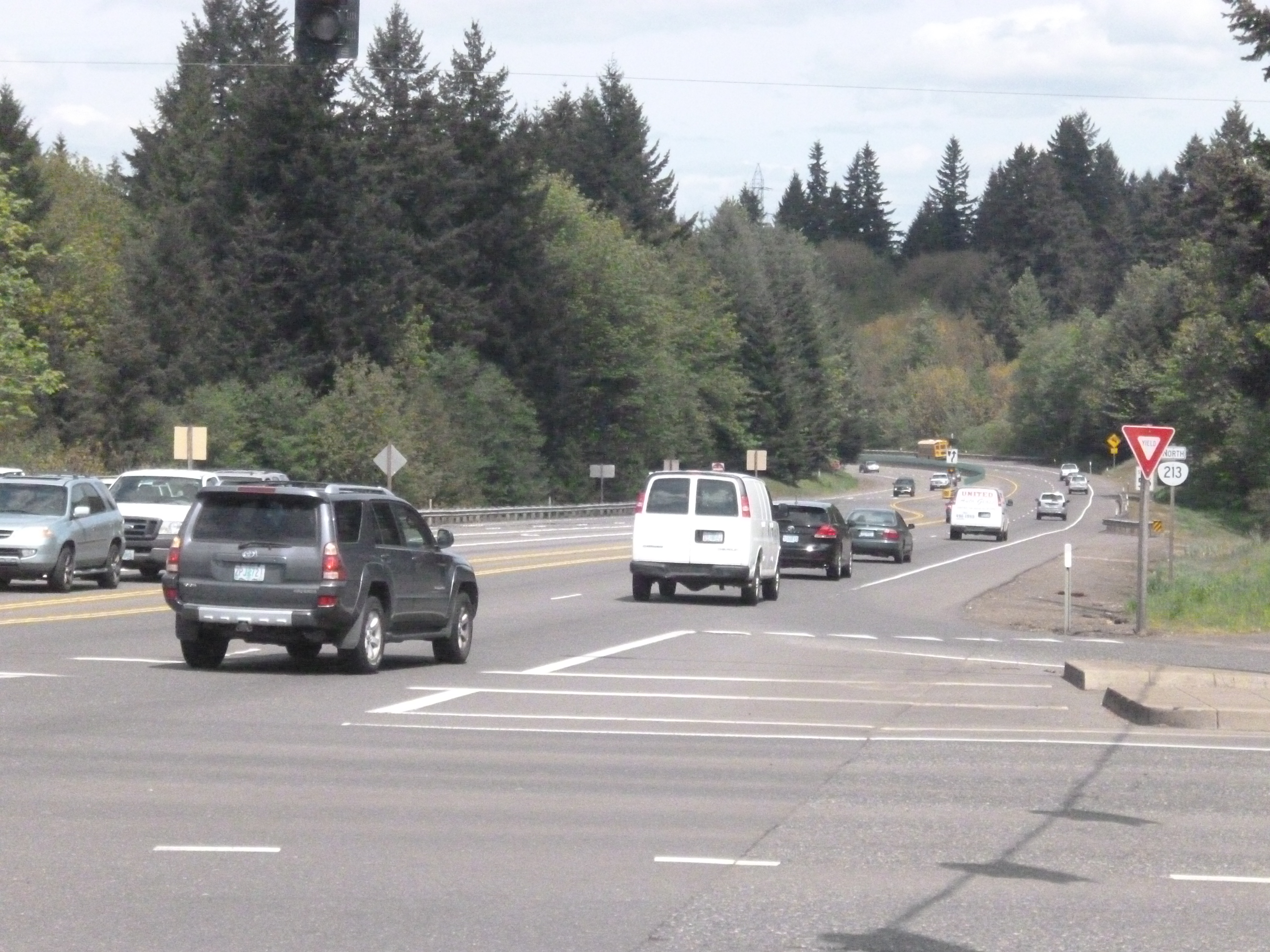
Oregon 213 where the expressway begins in Oregon City, Oregon.

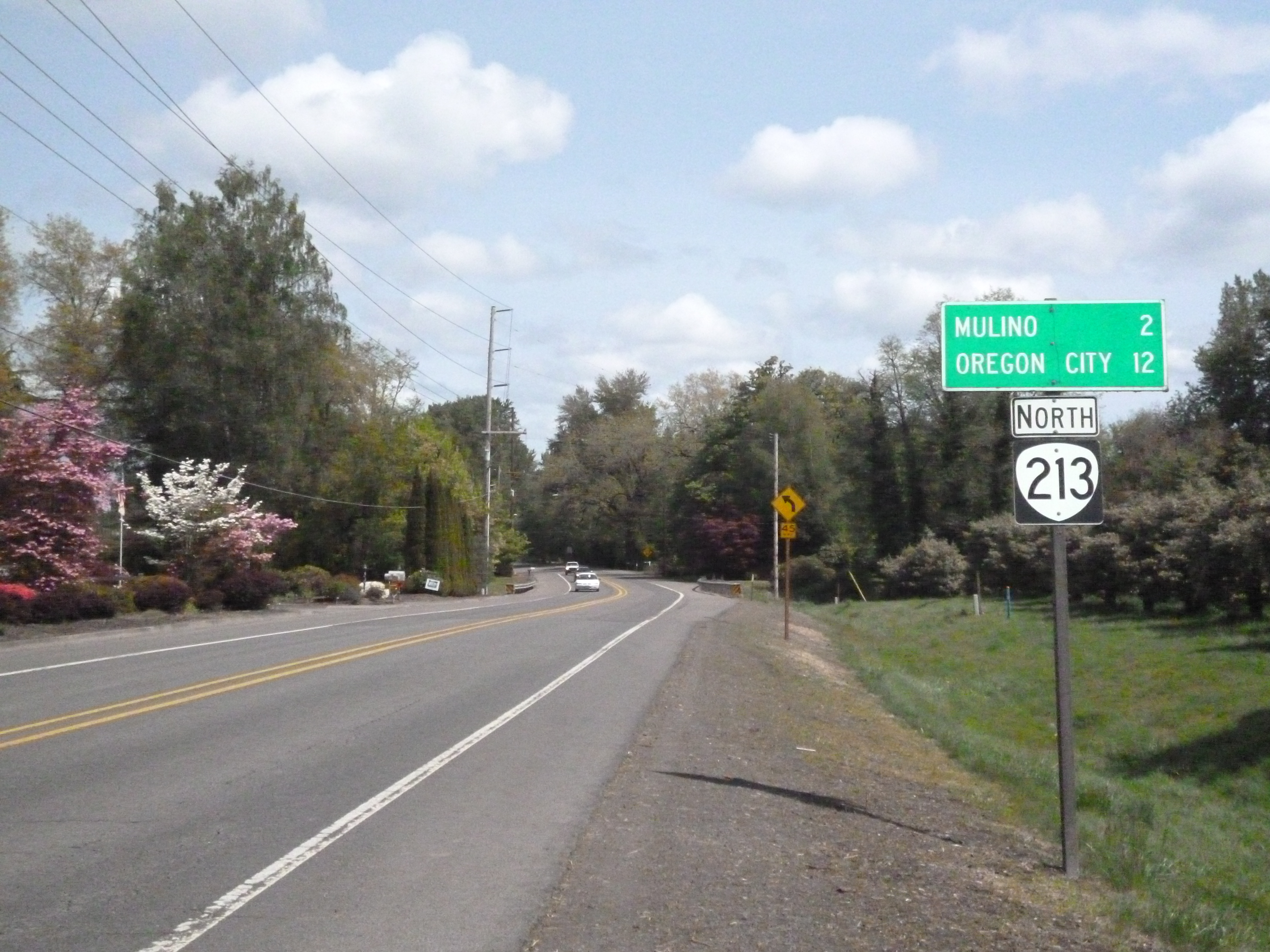
Oregon Route 213 Near Mulino, Oregon

Oregon Route 213 begins at Interstate 5 and travels up Market Street, Lancaster Drive and Silverton Road in Salem. It continues northeast on Silverton Road and intersects Oregon Route 214 in the town of Silverton. It travels north out of the town and proceeds that direction for twelve miles until it reaches Molalla. North of Molalla it comes to the communities of Liberal, Mulino and Carus where it continues northward as a two-lane, undivided route. In the vicinity of Clackamas Community College it intersects with Molalla Avenue. This part of the road is known alternatively as 82nd Drive, the Oregon City Bypass or the Trails End Highway. It heads north on a four-lane expressway through a scenic canyon on Oregon City's eastern edge for about three miles before running parallel with Interstate 205, mainly serving local traffic and local businesses. Here, as it heads north, it becomes Northeast and Southeast 82nd Avenue, a major five-lane traffic artery through east Portland. Which previous terminus was on the grounds of Portland International Airport at an intersection with Airport way halfway between Interstate 205 and the airport terminal. After the road was transferred to Portland in April of 2022, the highway effectively ends at the city limits in the Lents neighborhood, which is SE Clatsop street.

=== Highways comprising ===
OR 213 comprises the following named highways (see Oregon highways and routes) from north to south:

- The Cascade Highway North No. 68;
- Part of the Clackamas Highway No. 171 (concurrent with OR 224);
- Part of the East Portland Freeway No. 64 (concurrent with I-205);
- The Cascade Highway South No. 160;
- Part of the Hillsboro-Silverton Highway No. 140 (concurrent with OR 214);
- Main Street in Silverton;
- McClaine Street in Silverton;
- Silverton Road in Marion County;
- Lancaster Drive in Salem; and
- Market Street in Salem.

== History ==
For the most part, the alignment of OR 213 has remained the same over the years; however the following re-alignments have occurred:

- OR 213 used to have a full connection with I-84 prior to the construction of I-205. Now, one can only enter I-84 headed westbound (towards downtown Portland) or exit I-84 onto OR 213 headed eastbound (coming from Portland). The OR 213 and I-84 intersection is also where OR 213 crosses over the MAX Blue, Red, and Green light rail lines at the Northeast 82nd Avenue station.
- Prior to the construction of the OR 224 Expressway, OR 213 headed south from Sunnyside Road, turned east onto what is currently Sunnybrook, turned again south onto 84th Avenue, proceeded onto what is now Ambler, and continued onto 82nd Drive through Clackamas.
- Prior to the construction of I-205, OR 213 shared an alignment with OR 212 between Clackamas and Oregon City along a local street known as 82nd Drive. It was realigned onto I-205 in 1971.
- Prior to the construction of the Oregon City Bypass in the late 1980s, the highway was routed on an alignment through Oregon City along Washington and 7th Streets and Molalla Avenue.
- In Salem, the highway did not use to connect to I-5 via Lancaster Drive and Market Streets; instead it continued west along Silverton Road (passing under I-5 but with no interchange) until the latter street's intersection with the old OR 99E alignment (Portland Road/Fairgrounds Road)
- On April 28, 2022 Portland took ownership of 82nd ave and is no longer controlled by ODOT. Now ends at the city limits (SE Clatsop street).

== Major intersections ==
Milepoints are as reported by ODOT and do not necessarily reflect current mileage. Z indicates overlapping mileage due to construction longer than established route, and – indicates negative mileage behind established beginning point. Segments that are locally maintained may be omitted. For routes traversing multiple named state highways, each milepoint is preceded by the corresponding state highway number.

County	Location	Milepoint	Exit	Destinations	Notes
Marion	Salem			I-5 / Market Street – Portland, Eugene, City Center, West Salem	SPUI; exit 256 on I-5; continues west as Market Street
Marion	Silverton			West Main Street	South end of Cascade Highway overlap (continues south as a county-maintained road)
Marion	Silverton	140 50.54		OR 214 east – Silver Falls State Park	South end of OR 214 concurrency
Marion	Silverton	140 50.50 160 29.65		OR 214 west – Mt. Angel, Woodburn	North end of OR 214 concurrency
Clackamas	Blackman's Corner	160 16.10		OR 211 – Woodburn, Molalla, Estacada	
Clackamas	Oregon City	160 3.59	South end of limited-access		
Clackamas	Oregon City	160 0.00 64 10.20	10	I-205 south – Salem	South end of I-205 overlap
Clackamas	Gladstone	64 11.05	11	Gladstone	
Clackamas		64 12.67	12	OR 212 east to OR 224 east – Damascus, Estacada; Roots Road – Johnson City	Signed as exits 12A (OR 212) and 12B (Roots Road) southbound
Clackamas		64 13.11 171 4.73	13	I-205 north – The Dalles, Seattle	North end of I-205 overlap; northbound exit and southbound entrance; remaining movements are via OR 224
Clackamas		171 4.17 68 10.02	—	OR 224 – Estacada, Milwaukie	
Clackamas		68 9.40	North end of limited-access		
Multnomah	Portland	68 4.75		US 26 (Powell Boulevard) – City Center, Ross Island Bridge, Gresham, Mount Hood	
Multnomah	Portland	68 2.27		I-84 west / US 30 west – City Center	Access via Jonesmore Street; exit 5 on I-84 / US 30
Multnomah	Portland	68 0.95		Sandy Boulevard – Hollywood District	Former US 30 Bus.
Multnomah	Portland	68 0.23		US 30 Byp. to I-205	Interchange
Multnomah	Portland	68 0.10		Columbia Boulevard	Interchange
Multnomah	Portland	68 0.00		NE 82nd Avenue north – Portland Airport	Continuation beyond Columbia Boulevard
1.000 mi = 1.609 km; 1.000 km = 0.621 mi: Concurrency terminus

== See also ==
- List of streets in Portland, Oregon
