= Interstate 205 (Oregon–Washington) =

Interstate Highway in Oregon and Washington

Interstate 205
- Map of the Portland area with I-205 highlighted in red

Route information
- Auxiliary route of I-5
- Maintained by ODOT and WSDOT
- Length: 37.13 mi (59.75 km)
- Existed: 1958–present
- History: Completed in 1983
- NHS: Entire route

Major junctions
- South end: I-5 in Tualatin, Oregon
- OR 43 / OR 99E in Oregon City; OR 213 / OR 224 in Clackamas, Oregon; US 26 in Portland, Oregon; I-84 / US 30 in Portland, Oregon; SR 14 in Vancouver, Washington; SR 500 in Vancouver, Washington
- North end: I-5 in Salmon Creek, Washington

Location
- Country: United States
- States: Oregon, Washington
- Counties: Oregon: Washington, Clackamas, Multnomah; Washington: Clark

Highway system
- Interstate Highway System; Main; Auxiliary; Suffixed; Business; Future
- Oregon Highways; Interstate; US; State; Named; Scenic
- State highways in Washington; Interstate; US; State; Scenic; Pre-1964; 1964 renumbering; Former
← OR 204	Oregon	→ OR 205
← SR 204	Washington	→ SR 206

Interstate 205 (I-205) is an auxiliary Interstate Highway in the Portland metropolitan area of Oregon and Washington, United States. The north–south freeway serves as a bypass route of I-5 along the east side of Portland, Oregon, and Vancouver, Washington. It intersects several major highways and serves Portland International Airport.

The freeway is 37 miles (60 km) long and connects to I-5 at both of its termini: to the south in Tualatin, Oregon, and to the north in Salmon Creek, Washington. I-205 is named the Veterans Memorial Highway and East Portland Freeway No. 64 in Oregon (see Oregon highways and routes). From Oregon City to Vancouver, the corridor is paralleled by a multi-use bicycle and pedestrian trail, as well as portions of the MAX Light Rail system between Clackamas and northeastern Portland.

A freeway to serve as an eastern bypass of Portland and Vancouver was conceived in a 1943 plan for the area, and in the 1950s was included in the federal government's preliminary plans for the Interstate Highway System. In 1958, the number 205 was assigned as the designation for the eastern bypass; the Oregon state government initially planned it to travel east through Lake Oswego and close to inner neighborhoods of Portland, but protests from several communities led to the route of I-205 being moved further east and south into other areas of Clackamas County.

Construction began in 1967 with work on the Abernethy Bridge over the Willamette River, which opened in 1970. By 1972, I-205 was extended west to Tualatin and north to Gladstone, but the Portland section was delayed by opposition from local governments. A six-lane design was chosen as a compromise, which allowed for the freeway to reach Portland in 1977. The Glenn L. Jackson Memorial Bridge, spanning the Columbia River between Portland and Vancouver, opened on December 15, 1982. The bridge connected to the Washington section of I-205, which had been completed in two stages between 1975 and 1976. The remaining 6.6 miles (10.6 km) in Portland opened on March 8, 1983, and two years later, additional ramps were constructed to connect with I-84.

== Route description ==
I-205 functions primarily as a bypass of I-5 in the Portland metropolitan area, and serves Vancouver, Washington, and the eastern suburban areas of Portland, Oregon. It is listed as part of the National Highway System, which identifies routes that are important to the national economy, defense, and mobility, and Washington state recognizes it as a Highway of Statewide Significance. The Oregon portion of I-205 is designated as East Portland Freeway No. 64 under the state's named highway system. In 2000, the Oregon portion was designated by the state legislature as the Veterans Memorial Highway, and has since been used for an annual vehicle convoy to mark Veterans Day.

The Oregon Department of Transportation (ODOT) and Washington State Department of Transportation (WSDOT) maintain I-205 within their respective states. Both agencies conduct annual surveys of traffic on segments of the freeway, the results of which are expressed in terms of annual average daily traffic (AADT), a measure of traffic volume for any average day of the year. In 2024, average traffic volumes on the Oregon portion ranged from 82,868 in Tualatin to 169,091 near I-84 in Portland. In 2024, the Washington portion ranged from 49,234 in Salmon Creek to 151,304 on the Glenn L. Jackson Memorial Bridge. The Glenn L. Jackson Bridge is the busier of the two main bridges over the Columbia River in the Portland area; the older Interstate Bridge on I-5 carried a daily average of 138,500 vehicles in 2019.

=== Washington and Clackamas counties ===
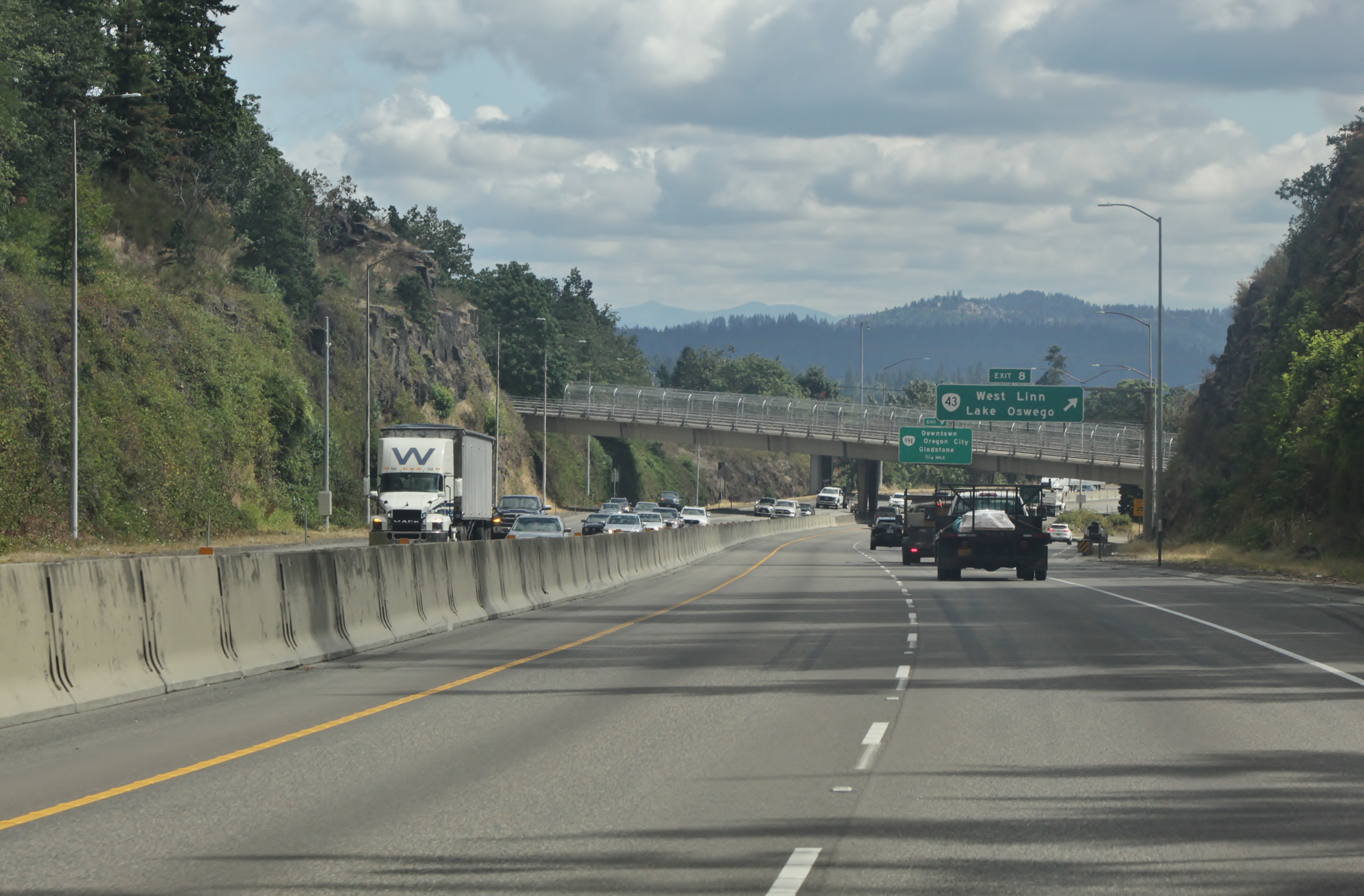
A four-lane section of I-205 in West Linn, approaching an interchange with OR 43

I-205 begins at a semi-directional T interchange with I-5 in eastern Tualatin, a suburb in Washington County, Oregon. The four-lane freeway travels east along Saum Creek and the Tualatin River into Clackamas County, where it passes a mix of exurban neighborhoods, forests, and farmland. After crossing the river, I-205 turns southeasterly into West Linn and runs along the banks of the Willamette River near Willamette Falls; the freeway has a scenic overlook of the falls for northbound traffic. After an interchange with Oregon Route 43 (OR 43), I-205 expands to six lanes and crosses the Willamette River on the Abernethy Bridge, which runs for 2,727 feet (831 m) into Oregon City and is capped to the east by an interchange with OR 99E. The freeway passes Oregon City's Amtrak train station, and then follows the railroad north to a junction with OR 213, which becomes concurrent with I-205.

The freeway continues north across the Clackamas River, passing through residential and industrial areas in Gladstone and Clackamas. Near Johnson City, I-205 intersects the west end of OR 212, which provides access to Boring and Mount Hood. The concurrency with OR 213 ends at a partial cloverleaf interchange with OR 224—the Sunrise Expressway—near several radio towers on the west side of Mount Talbert. I-205 briefly expands to eight lanes and intersects several roads near the Kaiser Sunnyside Medical Center and Clackamas Town Center, a regional shopping mall, then continues north through an unincorporated area between Milwaukie and Happy Valley. The freeway travels north with tracks on the west side for the MAX Green Line, a light rail service operated by TriMet, and enters Portland in Multnomah County.

=== Portland and Vancouver ===
I-205 passes through eastern Portland about 5 miles (8.0 km) from downtown, and runs parallel to OR 213 on 82nd Avenue and the I-205 Transitway that carries the MAX Green Line. From the Clackamas Town Center, the freeway travels through residential areas in the Lents neighborhood at the foot of Mount Scott, home to the Willamette National Cemetery. I-205 intersects U.S. Route 26 (US 26) at Powell Boulevard near Kelly Butte and the Jade District in Powellhurst-Gilbert. North of Division Street, the freeway marks the boundary between the neighborhoods of Montavilla and Hazelwood, and the MAX Green Line switches to the east side. I-205 then intersects Stark, Burnside, and Gilsan streets via a series of weaved ramps near Mall 205 and the Adventist Health Portland hospital.

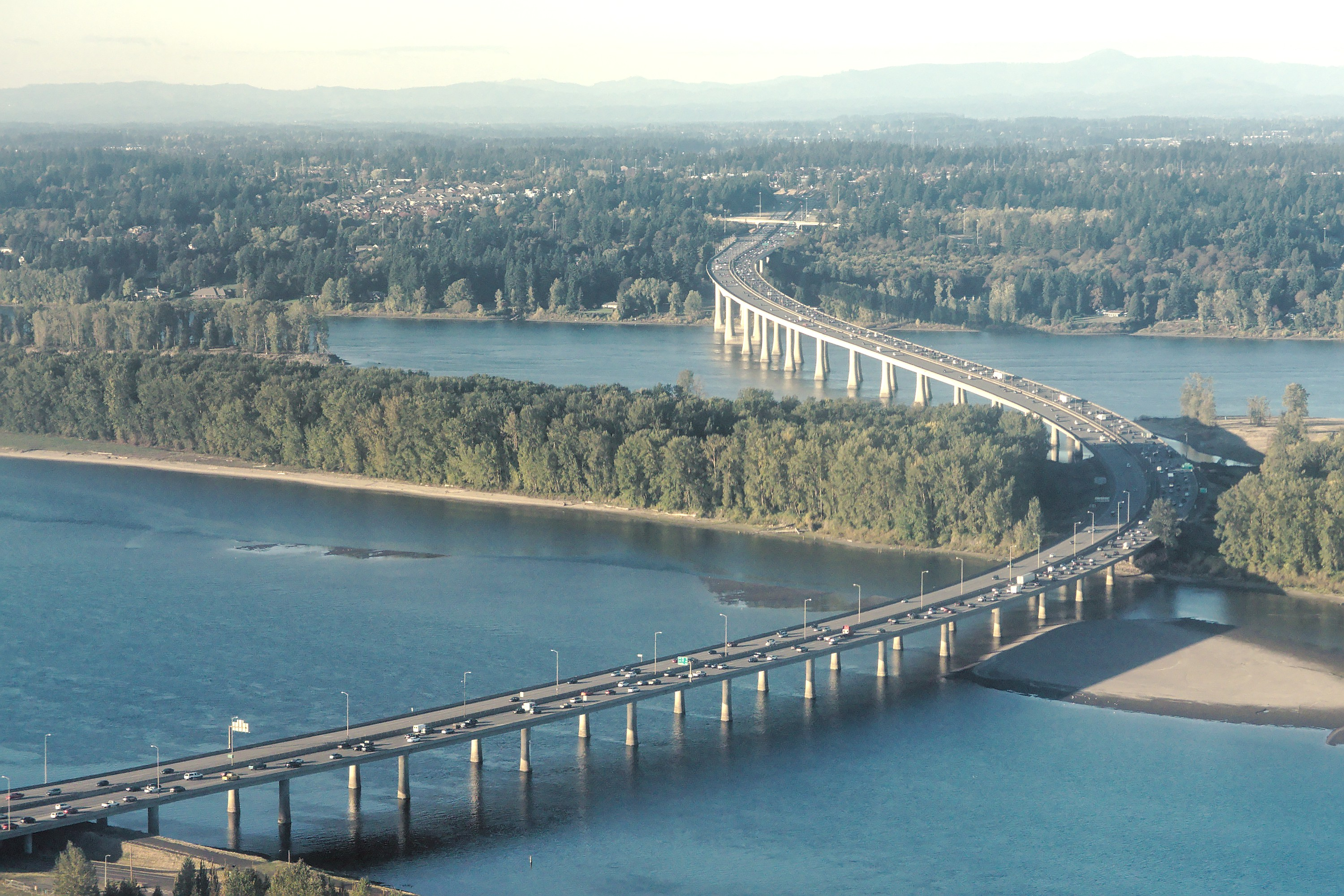
Aerial view of the Glenn L. Jackson Memorial Bridge, which carries I-205 across the Columbia River

North of Gilsan Street, the freeway intersects I-84 and US 30 near the Gateway/Northeast 99th Avenue Transit Center, where the MAX Green Line turns west. I-205 and I-84/US 30 travel parallel to each other for one mile (1.6 km) along the base of Rocky Butte, where they follow a section of the MAX Red Line on the I-205 Transitway. I-84/US 30 turns east towards the Columbia River Gorge at Northeast Fremont Street, while I-205 continues north around the suburban enclave of Maywood Park with the light rail trackway in its median. The freeway intersects US 30 Bypass (Lombard Street and Sandy Boulevard) and turns northeast to pass under a railroad in Parkrose. The MAX Red Line diverges west from the freeway towards Portland International Airport, which is accessed from I-205 via the Airport Way interchange on the south side of the Columbia River. I-205 crosses the Columbia River and Government Island on the eight-lane Glenn L. Jackson Memorial Bridge, a concrete segmental bridge that spans 11,750 feet (3,580 m) between Oregon and Washington.

On the Washington side of the river, I-205 serves the northeastern side of Vancouver and the surrounding unincorporated areas of Clark County. The freeway intersects State Route 14 (SR 14), a regional east–west freeway that connects to Downtown Vancouver and the Camas–Washougal area in a partial combination interchange on the north side of the river. I-205 curves northwest to intersect Mill Plain Boulevard in a partial cloverleaf interchange and Northeast 18th Street in a half-diamond interchange before it continues north through predominantly residential neighborhoods. The six-lane freeway then reaches a cloverleaf interchange with another east–west freeway, SR 500, on the east side of the Vancouver Mall. I-205 narrows to four lanes and travels northwest along LaLonde Creek to the community of Salmon Creek, where it terminates at an interchange with I-5. The incomplete interchange is located southwest of Washington State University Vancouver and requires some movements from I-5 to and from Vancouver to be made via two half-diamond interchanges on Northeast 134th Street.

=== Multi-use trail ===
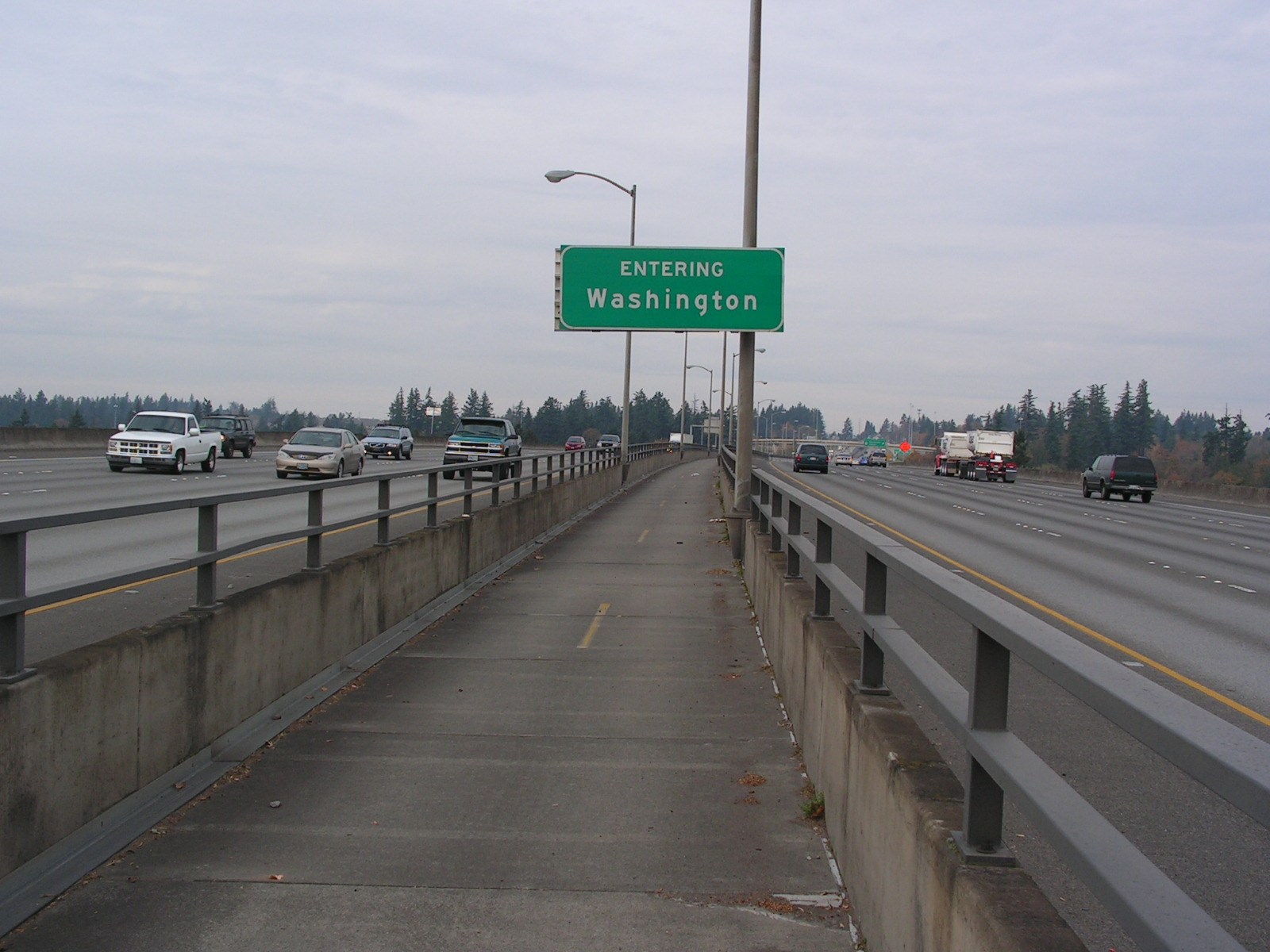
The multi-use bicycle and pedestrian trail on I-205, seen in the median of the Glenn L. Jackson Memorial Bridge

A multi-use bicycle and pedestrian trail follows I-205 for much of its distance on the Oregon side of the Portland metropolitan area, and connects to the Springwater Corridor trail near the Foster Road exit. The paved trail parallels the highway and the I-205 Transitway for 19 miles (31 km) from Oregon City to Southeast 23rd Street in Vancouver. The 12-foot-wide (3.7 m) trail is situated in the middle of the Glenn L. Jackson Memorial Bridge between lanes of traffic with 4.5-foot (1.4 m) barriers but has no access to Government Island. The bridge was designed to support light rail trains in the median, which would replace the trail, but the route was not considered by transit authorities. ODOT maintains the I-205 Trail, but some trash-pickup and site-cleanup responsibilities were transferred to the Portland city government in 2018.

== History ==
=== Planning and routing debate ===
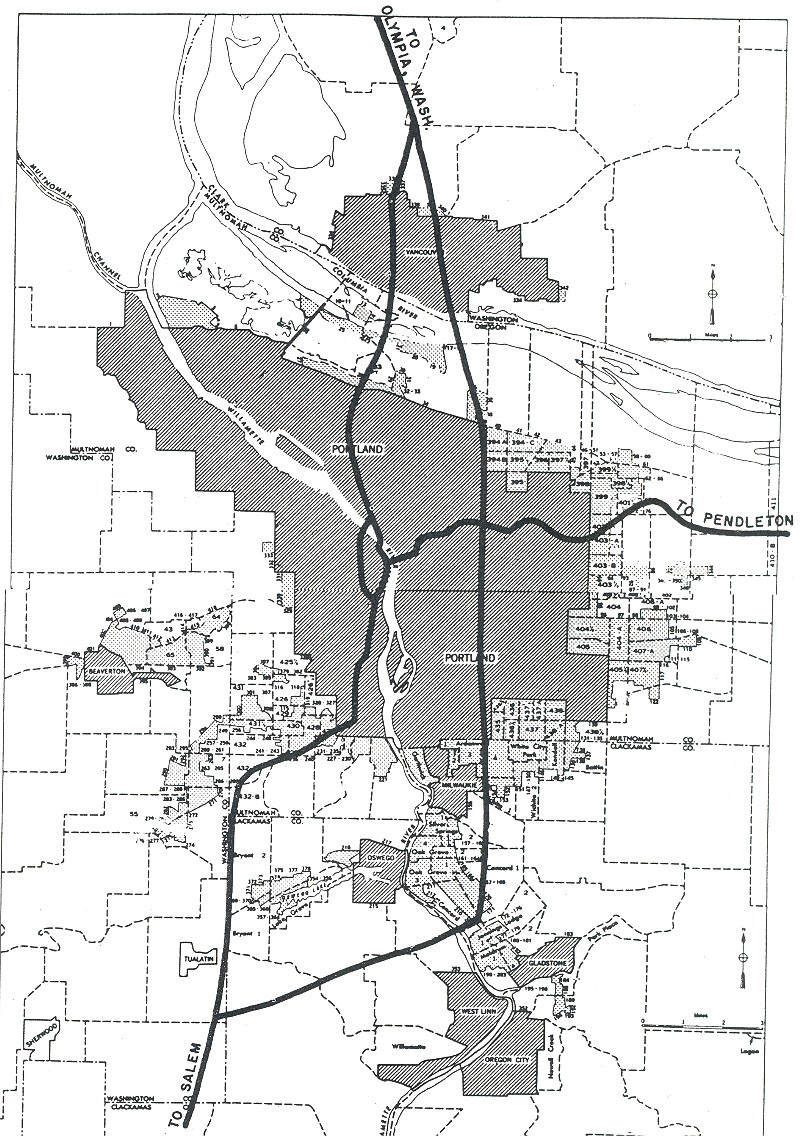
The general location of Portland-area freeways from the 1955 Bureau of Public Roads plan, including the Laurelhurst Freeway as an eastern bypass

In 1943, New York-based planner Robert Moses authored the Portland Improvement Plan, which included a "scenic thoroughfare" that would bypass Portland to the east and an inner loop of major roads in the downtown area. An earlier comprehensive plan from 1912 had envisioned a series of arterial highways along the future corridor, which would lead to a bridge over the Columbia River via Government Island. The corridor was among four Portland-area routes included in a 1955 plan from the federal Bureau of Public Roads (BPR) for what became the Interstate Highway System, which was approved one year later. The Oregon State Highway Commission designated it as the Laurelhurst Freeway, running along Northeast 39th Avenue—now César E. Chávez Boulevard—through the Laurelhurst neighborhood between Tualatin and crossing the Columbia River via a toll-free bridge. The bridge's proposed location was later shifted west to Northeast 30th Avenue to accommodate a runway extension at Portland International Airport.

The American Association of State Highway Officials approved I-205 as the designation for the Portland–Vancouver bypass freeway in November 1958. In 1961 it was added to Washington's state highway system as a branch of Primary State Highway 1, and it was renumbered to State Route 205 in 1964. To connect with its parent route I-5 at Tualatin, the Laurelhurst Freeway would turn west to cross the Willamette River at Lake Oswego and travel along the south side of the lake. It was planned to be the last major freeway in the Portland area to be completed under the 1955 plan; construction was projected to be finished by 1974 at a cost of $70 million (equivalent to $577 million in 2025 dollars). A corresponding western bypass of Portland was omitted from plans due to the topography of the Tualatin Mountains and a low population, but was unsuccessfully proposed in the 1960s as the Rivergate Freeway.

The first set of alternatives for the Laurelhurst Freeway, which was renamed the Central East Side Freeway and later referred to as I-205, were presented to the public in 1961 and 1962 ahead of a formal routing study. In December 1961, the Oregon State Highway Department presented five alternatives for the east–west section through Lake Oswego that drew opposition from community members and the local school district, which feared it would isolate the schools from homes. The Laurelhurst Community Council also organized opposition to the freeway plans at public hearings the following month; local residents feared disruption of the neighborhood's character, and an influx of low-income and multi-family development. In April 1963, responding to a petition drive from residents, the Lake Oswego City Council unanimously passed a resolution opposing any routing of I-205 in the city and a bridge over the Willamette River that would induce freeway construction.

In September 1963, a series of public hearings were held by the Oregon State Highway Department for an alternative proposal for I-205. The new route would cross the Willamette River south of Lake Oswego but travel further east of Portland along 111th Avenue and cross the Columbia River east of the airport at Government Island. Another alternative would remove the Lake Oswego alignment in favor of an east–west route along Division Street and Powell Boulevard (US 26) from I-5 at the Marquam Bridge, which had already been proposed for the Mount Hood Freeway. After initial disagreements, the city governments of West Linn and Milwaukie joined with a local chamber of commerce to support the Lake Oswego and 111th Avenue alternatives, while Lake Oswego remained opposed.

The Oregon State Highway Commission promised in 1963 not to pursue a Lake Oswego alignment that year because it would not be possible with opposition from the city government, but delayed its final decision by several months. In June 1964, the Portland–Vancouver Metropolitan Transportation Study (PVMTS) Technical Advisory Committee, a separate planning body formed in 1960 to produce a comprehensive plan, submitted an alignment to the state that would follow Tryon Creek along the northern edge of Lake Oswego and turn northeast to run in a trench along Northeast 52nd Avenue through Milwaukie and Portland. The route would then turn west to cross the Columbia River west of the airport and continue through eastern Vancouver along 54th Avenue towards Salmon Creek. The PVVMTS used an electronic computer system to compile and analyze various routes on the corridor over a four-year period to produce its recommendation.

The PVMTS-recommended route faced opposition from public officials in Vancouver, Lake Oswego, and Multnomah County, as well as citizens at public hearings held in Milwaukie, eastern Portland, Lake Oswego, and Glencoe. Other proposals from political and commercial groups included routing the east–west leg as far south as Canby and as far east as Gresham. The Multnomah County government remained supportive of an east–west route that used the Mount Hood Freeway corridor, which would connect with a north–south leg along 96th Avenue in eastern Portland. The corridor was estimated to cost $38 million less (equivalent to $301 million in 2025 dollars) than the PVMTS plan. In early July, several neighborhood groups who opposed the 52nd Avenue route organized the Portland Citizens Freeway Committee; at a meeting in late August, the committee presented a petition with 7,000 signatures to the Oregon State Highway Commission.

On October 14, 1964, in a report submitted to the Oregon State Highway Commission that proposed an eight-lane freeway that would cost approximately $90 million (equivalent to $713 million in 2025 dollars) to construct, the Oregon State Highway Department endorsed the Mount Hood Freeway and 96th Avenue alignment for I-205. The decision drew criticism from members of the PVMTS, particularly in Clark County on the Washington side, and the Portland City Planning Commission despite the city's earlier support of the 96th Avenue alignment. In early December, the Oregon State Highway Commission organized a week-long public hearing and exhibit for the proposed corridor at the Portland Public Auditorium, which drew 600 to 700 people. At the hearing, the City of Gresham and City of Camas joined the Multnomah County Commissioners in their support of the 96th Avenue alignment, while the City of Portland declined to endorse a specific plan.

The Oregon State Highway Commission had planned to send its own recommendation to the Bureau of Public Roads but delayed action due to a major flood in December 1964 that destroyed several highways. The commissioners considered moving I-205 beyond Portland's city limits to avoid confrontations with the city government, which later opened negotiations after pressure from state legislators. The commission endorsed the Mount Hood—96th Avenue alignment in March 1965. The Portland Planning Commission responded with the 52nd Avenue alignment through Laurelhurst in lieu of wider arterial streets, and also ordered a new east–west option near the Sellwood Bridge and along Johnson Creek to avoid Lake Oswego. In April, the Portland City Council voted 4–1 to reject the state's 96th Avenue alignment but took no action on the Planning Commission's proposed route.

Facing a July 1965 deadline on the routing decision imposed by the Bureau of Public Roads, which was later extended to September, the Oregon State Highway Department turned to a new corridor that would avoid the city of Portland. In May 1965, the department proposed an extended version of the 96th Avenue alignment that would continue further south, cross the Willamette River between Oregon City and West Linn, and turn west towards Tualatin. The new alignment would be 3.7 miles (6.0 km) over the allocated mileage for I-205, which would require additional approval from the BPR, and had been previously proposed in March as part of the Central Clackamas Freeway. The West Linn–96th alignment was given tentative approval by the BPR and was sent by the Oregon State Highway Commission to local governments in June as an "all or nothing" option. While they continued to work on their favored Mount Hood alignment, the City of Portland agreed to cooperate with the state on the new I-205 alignment, which would pass through only a small portion of the Lents neighborhood.

On September 8, 1965, the Portland City Council approved the state's West Linn–96th alignment for I-205 following the BPR's rejection of funds for the Mount Hood Freeway. A day earlier, the Washington State Highway Commission, having rejected an earlier proposal from Clark County to extend the freeway to Ridgefield, approved the location of the freeway's bridge over the Columbia River at Government Island, as well as a tentative route through eastern Vancouver to Salmon Creek. By October, the new Oregon alignment had gained the approval of all local governments along its route except for Washington County, which proposed a western bypass that was rejected by the state government.

The Oregon State Highway Commission adopted the West Linn–96th alignment on November 19, 1965, and forwarded the proposal to the BPR for approval despite opposition from Washington County and residents at public hearings. The Washington side's routing was finalized in late December and was also forwarded to the BPR. The BPR approved the revised routing in Oregon in March 1966; this was followed two months later by approval of Washington's alignment. I-205 was also integrated into the state highway system of Oregon as East Portland Freeway Highway No. 64 on April 21, 1966. The 52nd Avenue alignment was revived as a separate freeway proposal in a long-term plan but was never fully funded. In 1969, the federal government approved the Mount Hood Freeway as part of the relocation of I-80N (now I-84) from the existing Banfield Expressway; the new alignment would have been partially concurrent with I-205. The move was reversed in 1974 when the Mount Hood Freeway was canceled entirely.

=== Tualatin–Clackamas construction ===
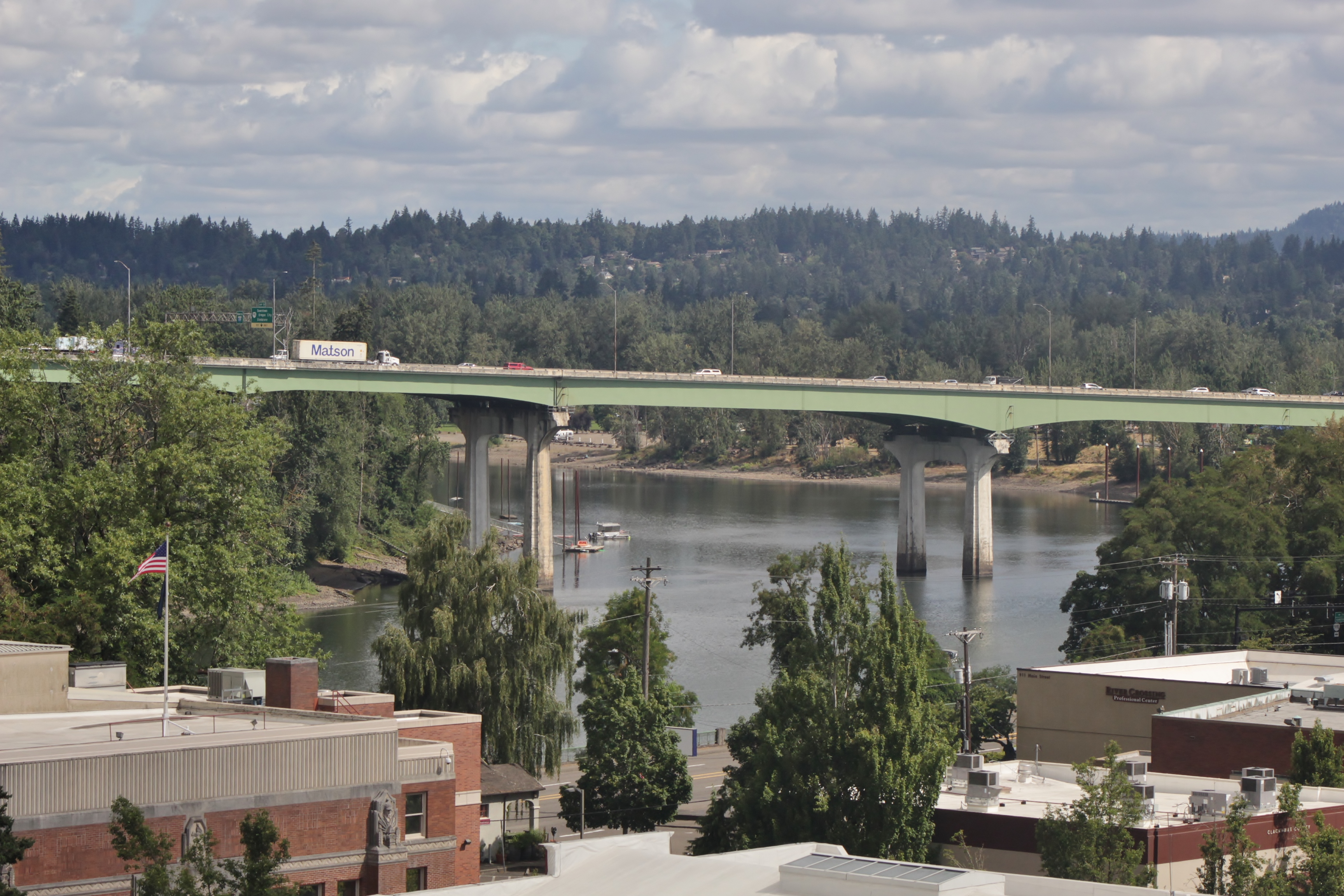
I-205 crosses the Willamette River on the Abernethy Bridge, which opened in 1970.

Preliminary work on the West Linn–Oregon City bridge, now named the George Abernethy Bridge, began in April 1967 with piledriving to determine the bridge's foundation requirements. Construction of the bridge would have required the closure of access to a popular fishing site on the Willamette River, causing local sport fishers to protest; a nearby site was later donated for use as a new boat launch and public fishing area. Demolition for the bridge project, which included the destruction of an existing shopping center, began in January 1968, and construction of the bridge itself was underway a month later. The George Abernethy Bridge opened to traffic on May 28, 1970, and cost $17.1 million to construct (equivalent to $109 million in 2025 dollars), completing the first section of I-205.

Construction on the second section of I-205, which spanned 8 miles (13 km) between I-5 in Tualatin and the bridge's approach in West Linn, began in 1968 and was completed on January 12, 1971. It cost $22.5 million (equivalent to $137 million in 2025 dollars) and required the removal of 2.5 million cubic yards (1.9×10^{6} m^{3}) of soil and rock. Work included the blasting of basalt cliffs for over a year during daytime hours. Excavation for the project caused a series of landslides near West Linn in 1969 that severely damaged the city's reservoir, destroyed three homes, and delayed the opening by months; after several months of water rationing, the reservoir was replaced with state funding the following year.

The West Linn section's opening spurred new residential development in the area and was expected to cause major increases in smog density. The section was designated as a state scenic highway to ban billboards and commercial development near Tualatin and also included the first rest area on I-205, which was built near West Linn. In late 1972, the freeway was extended northeast from Oregon City to Gladstone, connecting to an existing expressway bypass for OR 213 through Park Place that opened in July 1962. The interchange with OR 99E on the east approach of the bridge was built on fill using debris from excavation of the West Linn section. The final section in Clackamas County, connecting OR 213 at Lake Road to Sunnyside Road, opened in February 1975.

=== Portland delays and design changes ===
In June 1967, on its second attempt, the neighborhood of Maywood Park near Rocky Butte incorporated as a city to halt construction of I-205 by filing suit against the state. The lawsuit delayed planning; Maywood Park lost its case, and appealed through county and state courts, but in 1976 the city's final appeal to the U.S. 9th Circuit was denied. The court concluded Multnomah County had jurisdiction over the area at the time of the freeway's design approval. I-205 was relocated from an elevated viaduct to a trench west of Maywood Park; freeway construction, however, required the demolition of 87 homes in the city.

Another objection to the freeway's routing came from the Port of Portland, which had planned to extend the runways of Portland International Airport in a manner that would interfere with I-205's crossing of Government Island and the Columbia River. Planning of the bridge, which would use dredged fill near Government Island for its southern approach, was halted until the U.S. Army Corps of Engineers approved the runway plans in August 1969. The FHWA approved the bridge's basic design in September 1971; the design was extensively modified after the runway extension plans were abandoned in 1973. The lack of a runway expansion and its associated dredging work would necessitate a longer southern approach, which increased costs by $20 million (equivalent to $111 million in 2025 dollars) and delayed planning by 20 months. The bridge plans were also modified to include a bicycle and pedestrian path in the median to comply with the Oregon Bicycle Bill.

In 1967, the Oregon state government began acquisition of homes, businesses, and other properties on the future route of I-205, either through buyouts or condemnation. The buildings were auctioned for relocation to clear the right-of-way. Several business owners in eastern Portland appealed to state legislators for compensation, financial assistance for moving, and a year to relocate after freeway construction displaced them. A group representing the Clackamas Industrial Area, which was to be bisected by I-205, requested a study in 1967 to find a new route that would avoid the industrial park. The study concluded that an alternative alignment would be infeasible and displace nearby homes, which led to a 1969 decision by the commission to retain the original plan.

Under the initial design proposed in 1970 for I-205 through Portland, the freeway would be eight to ten lanes wide, and would carry a portion of I-80N between the Mount Hood Freeway and Banfield Expressway. The Portland and Multnomah County governments raised concerns about noise and air pollution near Lents School and the Rocky Butte Jail, the latter of which would sit 50 feet (15 m) from the freeway, and requested several design changes with a full environmental impact statement (EIS). The state's draft EIS, which was published in 1972, concluded I-205 would not have a major adverse impact on the local area but the Multnomah County environmental planner criticized it for not considering a "no build" option.

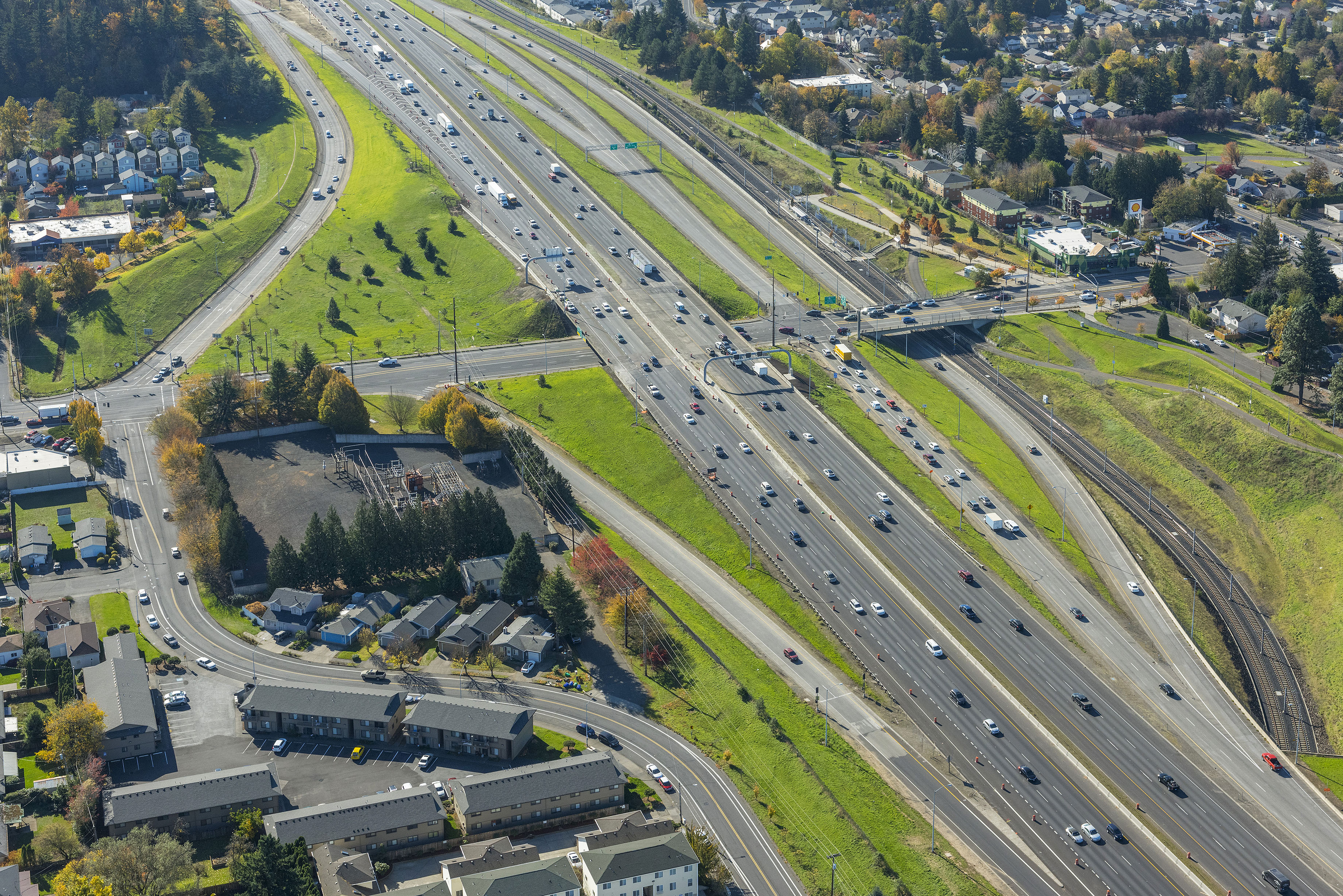
Aerial view of I-205 at Southeast Division Street in Portland with the MAX Green Line running parallel to the freeway

On July 2, 1974, the Multnomah County Board of Commissioners voted 3–2 to revoke their approval for the design of I-205 within the county. Board commissioners Donald Clark and Mel Gordon had proposed the move to force negotiations to reduce the freeway to eight lanes, remove several interchanges, add a transit corridor, and replace elevated sections with trenches. Several anti-freeway groups which had filed air pollution complaints with the state, including the Sierra Club, the Oregon Environmental Council, End Needless Urban Freeways (ENUF), and Sensible Transportation Options for People (STOP), supported the proposed changes, and added calls to include provisions for a busway or light rail line on the corridor. The Federal Highway Administration—successor to the BPR—denied a request from the county to withdraw its support and funding for the original design, and instead authorized the Oregon Department of Transportation (ODOT)—successor to the Highway Department—to advertise bids for the southernmost section in February 1975. The Portland City Council called on the state and county to seek a compromise but endorsed the modified design with a busway.

ODOT released the second draft EIS in February 1975; it concluded that constructing I-205 as originally designed would reduce congestion on other corridors but would cause increased air and noise pollution along the route, particularly in Lents and Maywood Park. The report also found freeway construction would destroy trees and other vegetation near Rocky Butte and on Government Island. In July 1975, Governor Bob Straub and Multnomah County officials announced a general compromise on a six-lane design for I-205 with seven transit stations connected by a busway, pending federal approval. At hearings, state legislators from eastern Multnomah County and members of the public criticized the design, which also reduced the number of full interchanges, as being inadequate for the area's needs. In January 1976, as part of a pressure campaign to support the eight-lane design with additional interchanges, businessman Fred G. Meyer announced plans to build a Fred Meyer store and a motel in the Gateway area.

In late 1975, as a compromise between the competing proposals, ODOT engineers conceived a third design incorporating a six-lane freeway with seven interchanges that alternated between partial and full access, a separated busway, and a bicycle trail. The FHWA initially opposed the busway design and were concerned about the safety of partial interchanges, but later withdrew their complaints following further design changes and endorsed the third concept in December. The Multnomah County Board of Commissioners endorsed the third design in February 1976 and Portland City Council followed later in the month, allowing it to be included in the EIS. In June, following a positive reception for the revised design at a public hearing, the Portland City Council and Multnomah County Commissioners approved construction of I-205 by unanimous votes. The final EIS was published in July and submitted to the FHWA, which granted its approval in October 1976. The state government acquired 1,448 properties on the I-205 route, mostly by the end of 1973 and at a cost of $120 million (equivalent to $609 million in 2025 dollars); the properties were cleared while the state government waited for the design changes.

=== Portland and Vancouver construction ===
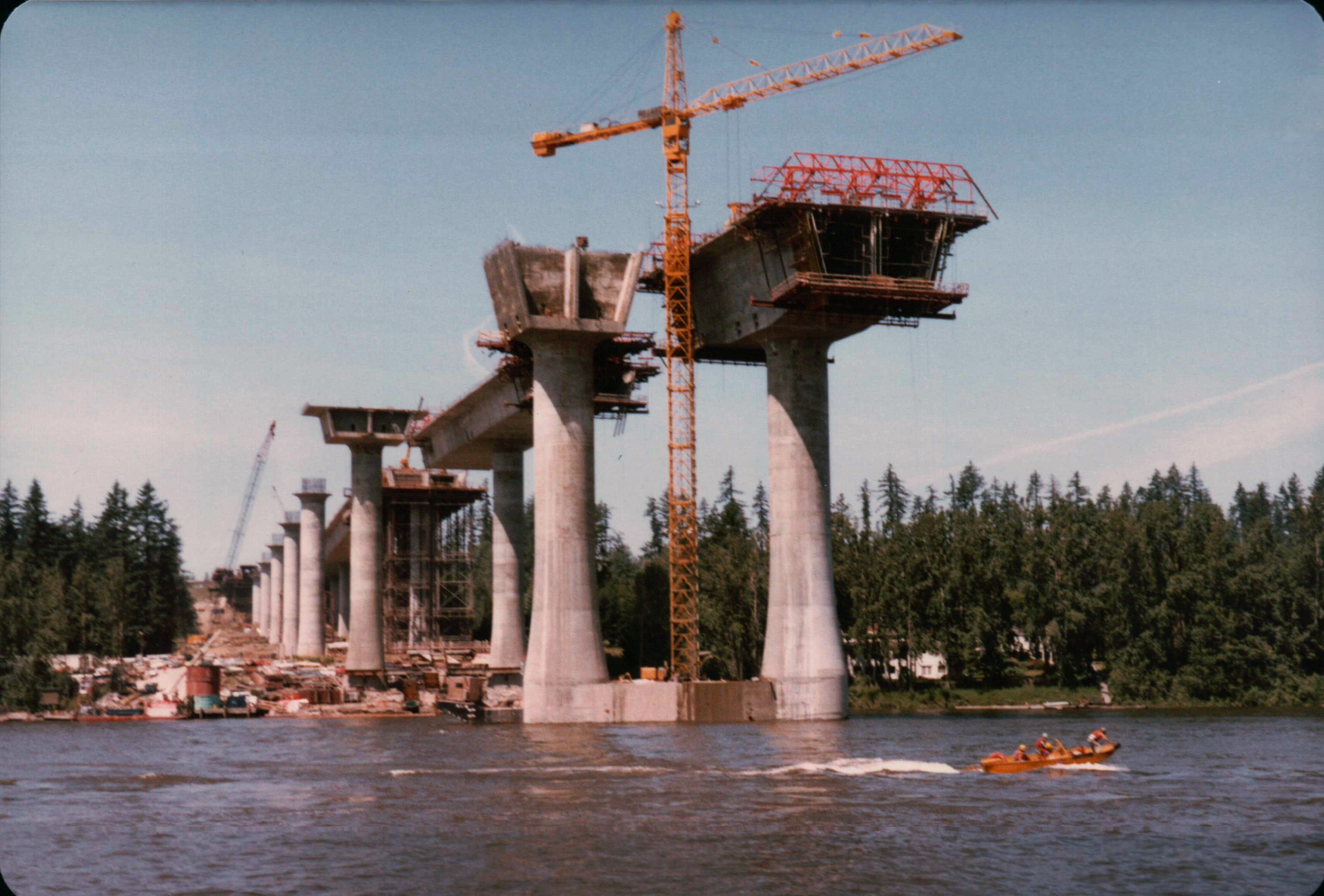
Construction of the Glenn L. Jackson Memorial Bridge viewed from the Columbia River

Construction of the 11-mile (18 km) section on the Washington side of the river began in July 1971. Early work on the section in northeastern Vancouver was briefly interrupted following the discovery of a seasonal campsite used by Coast Salish peoples, which necessitated an archeological dig. The Washington section cost $35 million (equivalent to $162 million in 2025 dollars) to construct; it opened to traffic in two stages without formal ceremonies. The northern section from Northeast 83rd Street to I-5 opened on August 22, 1975, and the southern section from SR 14 to Northeast 83rd Street opened on December 22, 1976. A new shopping center, the Vancouver Mall, was built at the I-205 and SR 500 interchange to attract cross-state traffic, and opened in 1977.

Construction of the first Portland section, which extended I-205 by 2.7 miles (4.3 km) from Sunnyside Road to Foster Road in southeastern Portland, began in early 1975. It opened to traffic on January 26, 1976, following a month-long delay caused by a shortage of signs and gantries. The state government awarded contracts for the remaining sections in Portland in 1977, with grading and preliminary work beginning that year. The second section, between Foster Road and Powell Boulevard (US 26), opened in February 1981 at a cost of $23 million (equivalent to $68.8 million in 2025 dollars). It comprised one mile (1.6 km) of the freeway, and a braided interchange with ramps to Powell Boulevard and Division Street.

Construction of the Glenn L. Jackson Memorial Bridge over the Columbia River, which is named for Oregon highway commissioner Glenn Jackson, began with a groundbreaking ceremony on August 23, 1977. Its construction used 592 post-tensioned segmental boxes that were lifted into place, a method that was relatively new to the U.S. at the time, and cost $175 million (equivalent to $493 million in 2025 dollars) to build. The bridge was opened to traffic on December 15, 1982, along with a link to the eastern portion of the Banfield Freeway (I-84) and two intermediate interchanges. The bicycle and pedestrian path on the bridge, part of a longer system along I-205, was opened the following year. The completion of the Glenn L. Jackson Bridge spurred major industrial and residential development in eastern Vancouver, and transformed it into a bedroom community that was characterized as urban sprawl. The planned growth around I-205 and its potential to encroach on the Columbia River Gorge led to calls for a national scenic area, which was established in 1986 to protect the area from development.

The final section of I-205, which spanned 6.6 miles (10.6 km) from Division Street to the northern junction with the Banfield Freeway, opened to traffic on March 8, 1983. Its completion was delayed by the pending transfer of prisoners from the Rocky Butte Jail to the new Multnomah County Jail in Downtown Portland. A series of high fences were temporarily built to mitigate air and noise pollution until the transfer was completed. The old jail was closed in November 1983 and was demolished the following year to make way for the remainder of the southern interchange with the Banfield Freeway. The Division–Banfield section of I-205 initially opened with four through lanes, which was expanded to six in December 1984. The full southern interchange was opened in 1985, coinciding with the widening of I-84 to accommodate expected traffic from I-205. The estimated total cost of I-205 construction in 1983 was $375 million (equivalent to $1.02 billion in 2025 dollars).

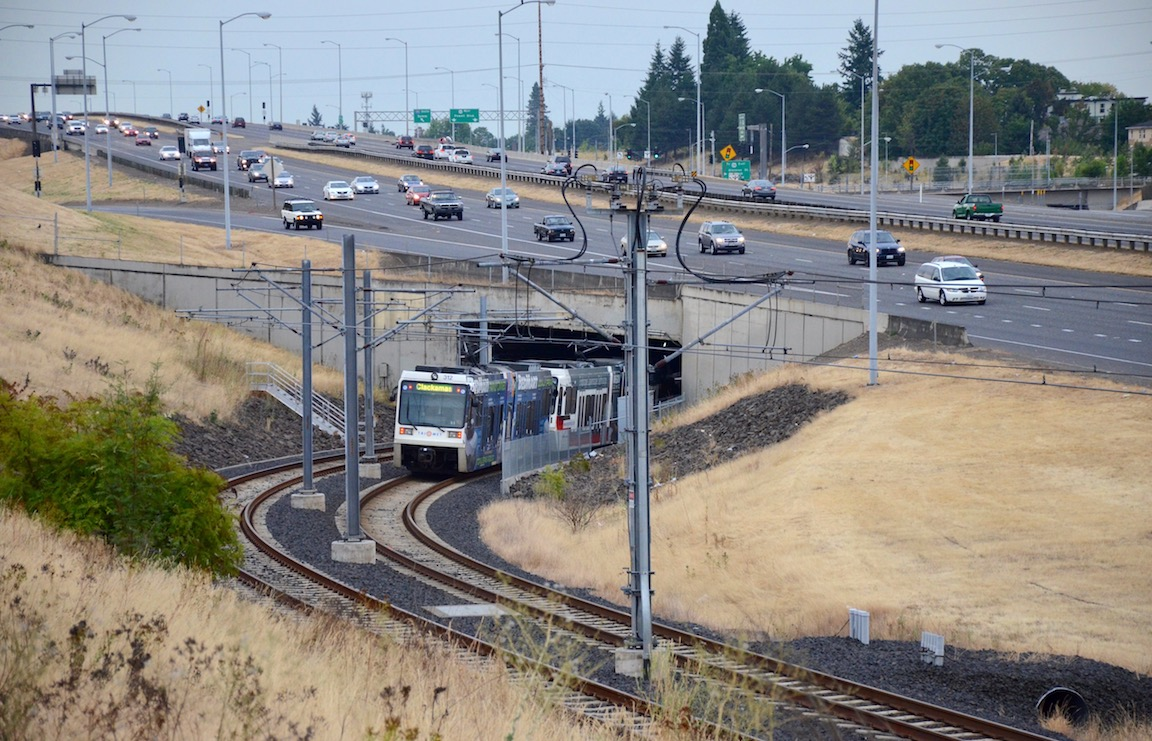
A MAX Green Line train entering a tunnel under I-205 near Division Street

The parallel transitway on the I-205 corridor was graded but left unfinished. It ran to the west of the freeway from Foster Road to a tunnel near Division Street, and switched to the east side through Gateway and the median from Rocky Butte to Columbia Boulevard. While initially envisioned for use by buses, TriMet and Metro pursued a light rail line that would connect with the existing Banfield line—now the MAX Blue Line—which opened in 1986 along the I-84 corridor. Congress approved the reallocation of federal funds in 1987, and the plan was formally submitted to the FHWA by the Oregon state government in 1989. A short section of the transitway was used for the Banfield line and the northern section was incorporated into the MAX Red Line, which opened in 2001 to serve Portland International Airport. The remainder of the transitway from Gateway to Clackamas was built out as part of the MAX Green Line, which opened in 2009.

=== Later developments ===
Several infill interchanges were added to I-205 as new development on the corridor contributed to increased traffic congestion on the freeway and adjacent streets. Between 1983 and 1985, traffic volumes on the freeway had increased by a third. In December 1984, a split interchange with Stark and Washington streets near Mall 205 was expanded to include ramps to Glisan Street and a frontage road. An interchange with Lester Avenue—now Johnson Creek Boulevard—was proposed in the late 1980s to relieve congestion at the nearby Sunnyside Road interchange, which by 1989 had become the busiest in Oregon. The new interchange, which was approved despite opposition from local residents, was completed in November 1990 at a cost of $6.9 million (equivalent to $15 million in 2025 dollars).

The opening of the Glenn L. Jackson Bridge reduced traffic on the older Interstate Bridge from over 116,000 vehicles per weekday in 1982 to 96,000 in 1986; the Glenn L. Jackson Bridge carried 61,000 vehicles in 1986 and has a capacity of 140,000 daily vehicles. By 1996, traffic on the bridge had exceeded that on the Interstate Bridge, and I-205 was used the following year as a major detour route during repairs to the older bridge. For several months in 2000, the Glenn L. Jackson Bridge underwent weekend closures to allow for the replacement of its expansion joints, which had been damaged by increased traffic. The Clackamas River Bridge on I-205 in Gladstone underwent similar expansion joint replacements over an eleven-month period in 2001.

To manage congestion, ODOT installed ramp meters at 11 locations along I-205 from 1999 to 2001 and worked with Metro to study other solutions, which were deemed infeasible due to a lack of funds for substantial construction. The Sunnyside Road interchange, which handled 50,000 daily vehicles and remained congested due to growth at the Clackamas Town Center, was rebuilt from 2001 to 2003 at a cost of $28 million (equivalent to $48.5 million in 2025 dollars). The project split the interchange between Sunnyside Road and an extended Sunnybrook Boulevard to the south with frontage roads between the two overpasses. In 2007, at the suggestion of Oregon congressperson Darlene Hooley, a 3-mile (4.8 km) section of the freeway from Tualatin to West Linn was widened to six lanes through the reuse and upgrade of temporary lanes that were constructed for a repaving project.

The Washington state government funded two improvements to the Mill Plain Boulevard interchange on I-205 in Vancouver through its 2003 and 2005 legislative packages. The first stage, which was completed in October 2009, added an offramp to Chkalov Drive (named for Soviet pilot Valery Chkalov) to bypass its congested intersection with Mill Plain. The second project added a set of braided ramps to a new interchange with Northeast 18th Street, which opened in July 2016 at a cost of $40.6 million. Both projects were proposed in the 1990s, initially as a split interchange with 18th and 28th streets, amid a development moratorium on Mill Plain that the City of Vancouver imposed due to traffic congestion.

The freeway's concurrency with OR 224 near Clackamas was eliminated in 2016 with the opening of the Sunrise Expressway, when OR 224 was realigned to bypass a section of OR 212. In 2017, ODOT began a major repaving and modernization project on the Oregon section of I-205, which was funded with $30 million from the state's new transportation package. The project was completed in 2020 at a cost of $60 million, and included the addition of a variable speed limit and variable message signs, new stormwater treatment facilities, and the construction of auxiliary lanes near OR 224 and between Powell Boulevard and I-84.

== Future plans ==
In the 2020s, ODOT plans to reconstruct a seven-mile (11 km) section of I-205 in Clackamas County between Stafford Road and OR 213 to add a third through lane in each direction and conduct seismic upgrades to Abernethy Bridge and Tualatin River bridge. The program began construction in July 2022 and was originally scheduled to last until 2028 and cost $700 million; ODOT later announced that the project would be completed in 2030 and would cost $177 million more than budgeted. Part of the costs would be funded through variable tolling that was scheduled to begin as early as 2024 pending federal approval, which drew opposition from the public but was approved by the state government in 2018. In May 2023, governor Tina Kotek deferred all toll collection until 2026 and the formation of a legislative subcommittee to review plans. Due to the loss of toll revenue, the second phase was deferred indefinitely; the bridge replacement and widening program is expected to cost $1.36 billion. ODOT announced in September 2023 that it would cancel plans to toll the Tualatin River bridge and defer the third lane between Tualatin and Oregon City due to a lack of funding.

In the 1990s, the states of Oregon and Washington began planning a replacement for the Interstate Bridge, which later became the Columbia River Crossing program of the 2000s and 2010s. Among the options considered was a north–south light rail line on either I-5 or I-205 to connect Vancouver to the rest of the MAX Light Rail system. The Glenn L. Jackson Bridge had been deemed capable of handling the weight of light rail vehicles in the 1980s but would require extensive renovations. A replacement crossing at the site of the Interstate Bridge with light rail capabilities was later chosen for the program, which was shelved in 2014 following disagreements on funding and the final design of the bridge.

The replacement bridge would have been funded by tolls on I-5 that would increase daily traffic on the Glenn L. Jackson Bridge by 40,000 vehicles, which led to calls to also toll I-205. The second iteration of the Columbia River Crossing program, which was revived in 2019 as the Interstate Bridge Replacement Program, proposes tolling both I-5 and I-205 to fund the project, and to serve as congestion pricing to deter driving. Long-term plans from the Southwest Washington Regional Transportation Council, the planning body for Clark County, include making improvements to several interchanges on I-205 by 2040.

== Exit list ==
Mileposts and exit numbers carry over from Oregon to Washington.

State	County	Location	mi	km	Exit	Destinations	Notes
Oregon	Washington	Tualatin	0.00	0.00		I-5 – Salem, Portland	Southern terminus
Oregon	Clackamas		3.16	5.09	3	Stafford Road – Lake Oswego	
Oregon	Clackamas	West Linn	6.40	10.30	6	10th Street	
Oregon	Clackamas	West Linn	8.82	14.19	8	OR 43 – West Linn, Lake Oswego	Bicycles permitted southbound and prohibited northbound
Oregon	Clackamas	Willamette River	9.13	14.69	Abernethy Bridge		
Oregon	Clackamas	Oregon City	9.29	14.95	9	OR 99E – Downtown Oregon City, Gladstone	
Oregon	Clackamas	Oregon City	10.24	16.48	10	OR 213 south – Oregon City, Molalla	Southern end of OR 213 concurrency
Oregon	Clackamas	Gladstone	11.05	17.78	11	82nd Drive – Gladstone	
Oregon	Clackamas		12.67	20.39	12	OR 212 east to OR 224 east – Damascus, Estacada	Northbound signage
Oregon	Clackamas		12.67	20.39	12A	OR 212 east – Damascus	Southbound signage
Oregon	Clackamas		12.67	20.39	12B	Roots Road – Johnson City	Southbound signage
Oregon	Clackamas		13.11– 13.39	21.10– 21.55	13	OR 213 north (82nd Avenue) / OR 224 – Milwaukie	Northbound signage; northern end of OR 213 concurrency
Oregon	Clackamas		13.11– 13.39	21.10– 21.55	13	OR 224 – Estacada, Milwaukie	Southbound signage
Oregon	Clackamas		14.31– 14.58	23.03– 23.46	14	Sunnybrook Boulevard / Sunnyside Road	
Oregon	Clackamas		16.24	26.14	16	Johnson Creek Boulevard	
Oregon	Multnomah	Portland	17.85	28.73	17	Foster Road	
Oregon	Multnomah	Portland	19.12– 19.61	30.77– 31.56	19	US 26 (Powell Boulevard) / Division Street	Limited southbound access to/from Powell Boulevard; no northbound entrance from eastbound Division Street
Oregon	Multnomah	Portland	20.57– 21.12	33.10– 33.99	20	Washington Street / Stark Street	Northbound signage
Oregon	Multnomah	Portland	20.57– 21.12	33.10– 33.99	21A	Glisan Street	Northbound signage
Oregon	Multnomah	Portland	20.57– 21.12	33.10– 33.99	21A	Glisan Street / Stark Street	Southbound signage
Oregon	Multnomah	Portland	21.59	34.75	21B	I-84 west / US 30 west – Portland	
Oregon	Multnomah	Portland	22.61	36.39	22	I-84 east / US 30 east – The Dalles	
Oregon	Multnomah	Portland	23.68	38.11	23A	US 30 Byp. east (Sandy Boulevard)	
Oregon	Multnomah	Portland	23.68	38.11	23B	US 30 Byp. west (North Lombard Street)	
Oregon	Multnomah	Portland	24.65	39.67	24	Airport Way – Portland Airport	Signed northbound as exits 24A (west) and 24B (east)
Columbia River			26.56	42.74	Glenn L. Jackson Memorial Bridge; Oregon–Washington state line		
Washington	Clark	Vancouver	27.21	43.79	27	SR 14 – Vancouver, Camas	Bicycles permitted northbound and prohibited southbound
Washington	Clark	Vancouver	28.30	45.54	28	Mill Plain Boulevard	Signed northbound as exits 28A (east) and 28B (west)
Washington	Clark	Vancouver	28.30	45.54	28C	Northeast 112th Avenue	Northbound exit only
Washington	Clark	Vancouver	29.31	47.17	29	Northeast 18th Street	Northbound exit and southbound entrance
Washington	Clark	Vancouver	30.97	49.84	30A	Northeast Gher Road / Northeast 112th Avenue	Southbound exit is via exit 30
Washington	Clark	Vancouver	30.97	49.84	30	SR 500 – Vancouver City Center	Signed northbound as exits 30B (east) and 30C (west)
Washington	Clark	Vancouver	31.08	50.02	30	Vancouver Mall (Fourth Plain Boulevard)	No northbound exit
Washington	Clark	Vancouver	33.02	53.14	32	Padden Parkway / Northeast Andresen Road – Battle Ground	
Washington	Clark		36.72	59.10	36	Northeast 134th Street – WSU Vancouver	
Washington	Clark		37.13	59.75		I-5 north – Seattle	Northern terminus; northbound exit and southbound entrance
1.000 mi = 1.609 km; 1.000 km = 0.621 mi: Concurrency terminus; Incomplete access
