= Oregon Route 214 =

State highway in Marion County Oregon, US

Oregon Route 214
- Route 214 highlighted in red

Route information
- Maintained by ODOT
- Length: 44.79 mi (72.08 km)

Major junctions
- South end: OR 22 near Aumsville
- OR 213 in Silverton; OR 99E in Woodburn; OR 99E / OR 211 in Woodburn
- North end: I-5 / OR 219 in Woodburn

Location
- Country: United States
- State: Oregon
- County: Marion

Highway system
- Oregon Highways; Interstate; US; State; Named; Scenic
← OR 213	→ OR 216

Oregon Route 214 is an Oregon state highway which runs from the city of Woodburn, southeast into Silver Falls State Park in the Cascade foothills, and then loops back west towards Salem. The northern segment of the highway (between Silverton and Woodburn) is known as the Hillsboro-Silverton Highway No. 140 (see Oregon highways and routes), a designation which continues north on OR 219, and the southern segment (southeast of Silverton) is known as the Silver Creek Falls Highway No. 163.

== Route description ==
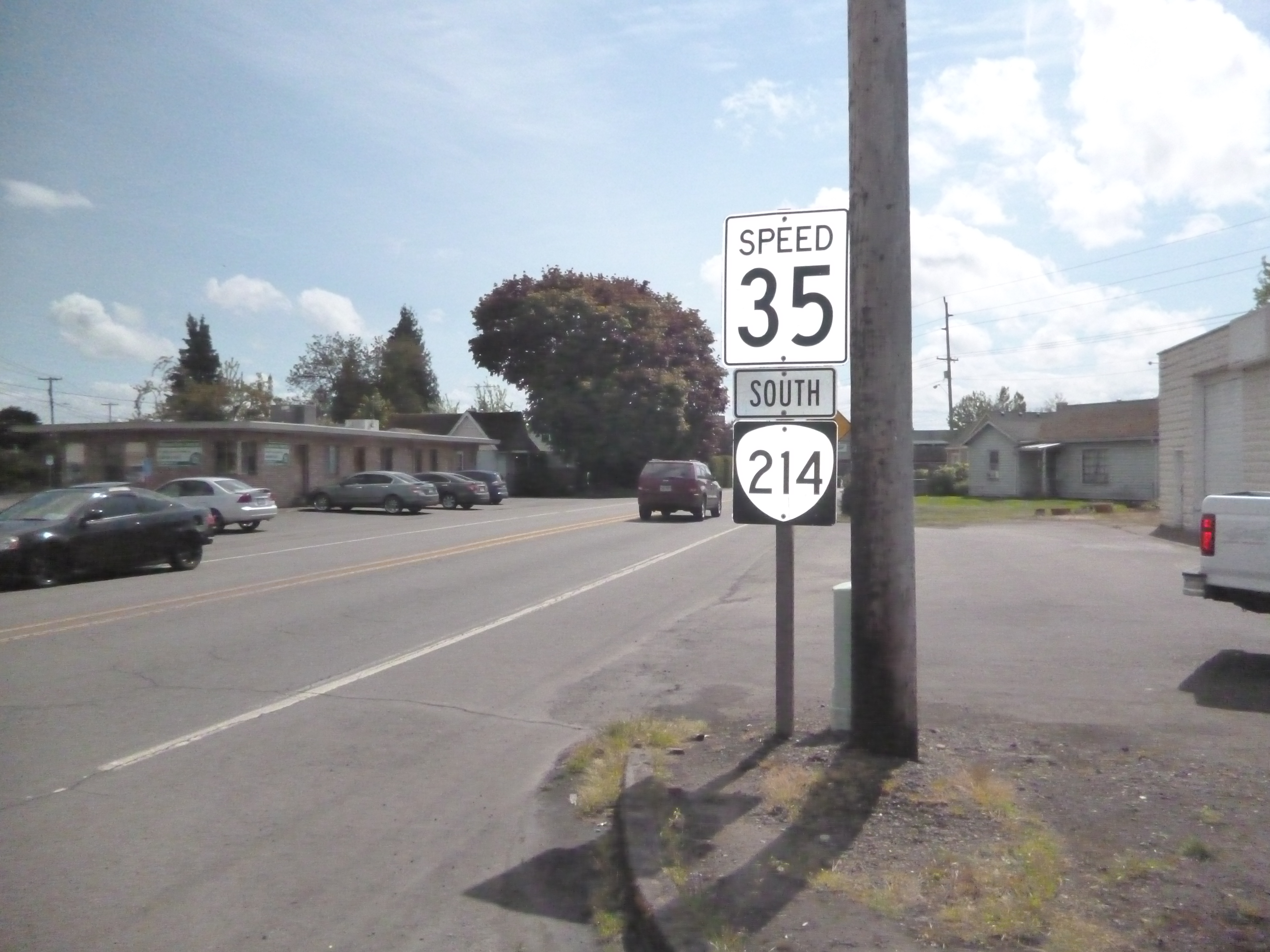
Start of Oregon Route 214

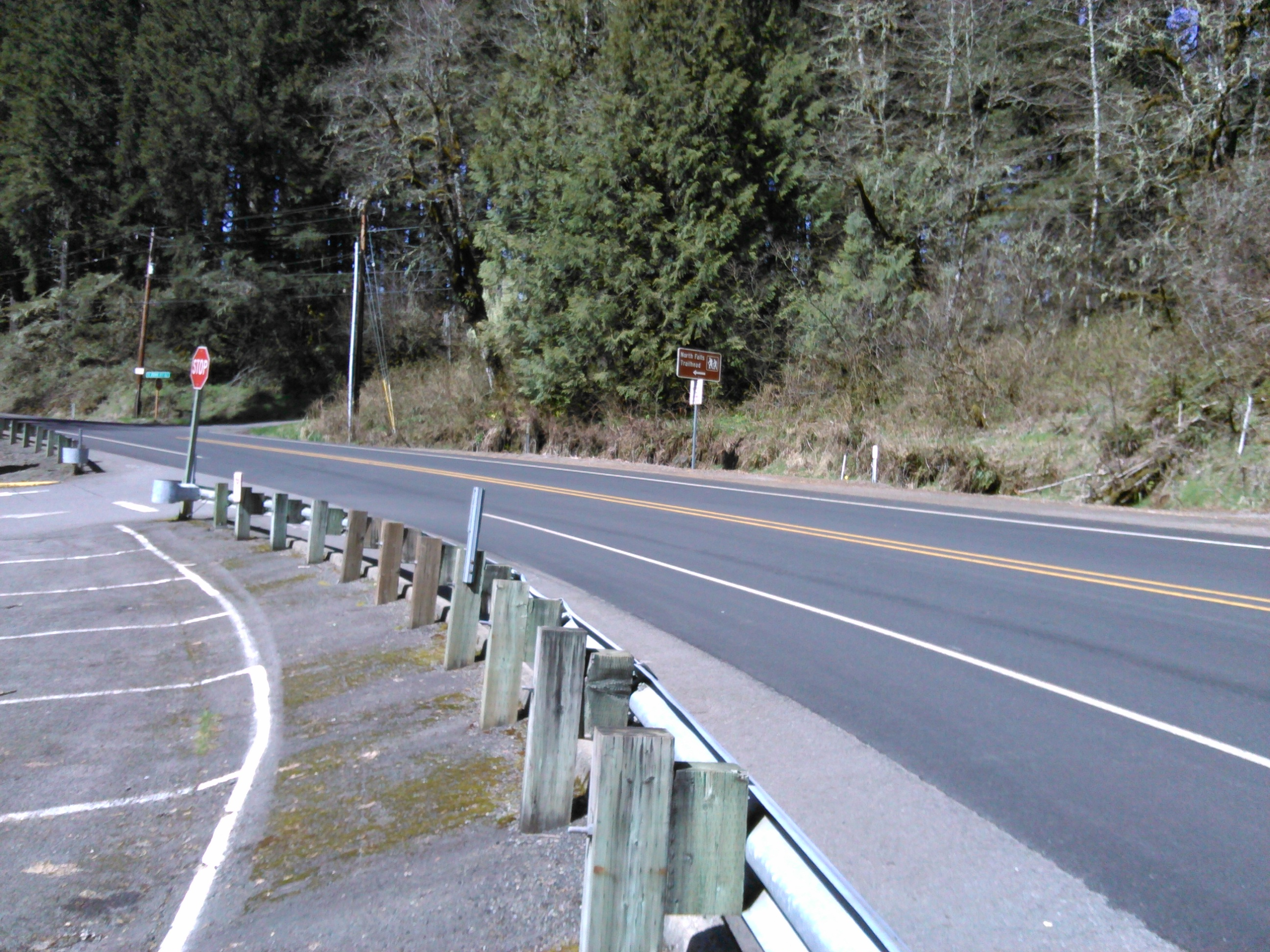
The highway in Silver Falls State Park

OR 214's northern terminus is at the junction with Interstate 5 and OR 219 in the city of Woodburn. (A single diamond interchange serves both OR 219 and OR 214 from the freeway; OR 219 leads west of the interchange and OR 214 heads east). The roadway heads due east into the city of Woodburn for about 2.5 miles (4.0 km), skirting the northern edge of town (though passing through a very busy shopping district). It then intersects with both OR 99E and OR 211; OR 214 continues south from this intersection, sharing an alignment with OR 99E for 1.2 miles (1.9 km), officially along the Pacific Highway East No. 1E. OR 214 then departs from OR 99E and heads southeast.

Outside of Woodburn, OR 214 is a two-lane country road. The next town of note heading south is Mount Angel, followed by Silverton. In Silverton, OR 214 intersects with OR 213, which heads north to Molalla and south (southwest) to Salem.

OR 214 continues southeast from Silverton, now as the Silver Falls Highway. The highway, almost immediately upon leaving the Silverton city limits, starts climbing into the Cascade foothills, until it enters Silver Falls State Park. Upon entering the park, the highway turns south, and provides several points of access to various park facilities and attractions. Upon leaving the park, the highway heads west towards the Salem area. It terminates near Aumsville at an interchange with OR 22.

One significant alignment change occurred during the 90's. It used to be the case that OR 214, rather than having its northern terminus in Woodburn, instead continued west towards St. Paul, where it terminated at an intersection with OR 219 (which continued south to Salem on River Road). However, that section of OR 219 is no longer signed as a state route, and the section of OR 214 between St. Paul and Woodburn was renumbered as OR 219. Many maps (including Yahoo Maps) still show the old alignments of OR 219 and OR 214.

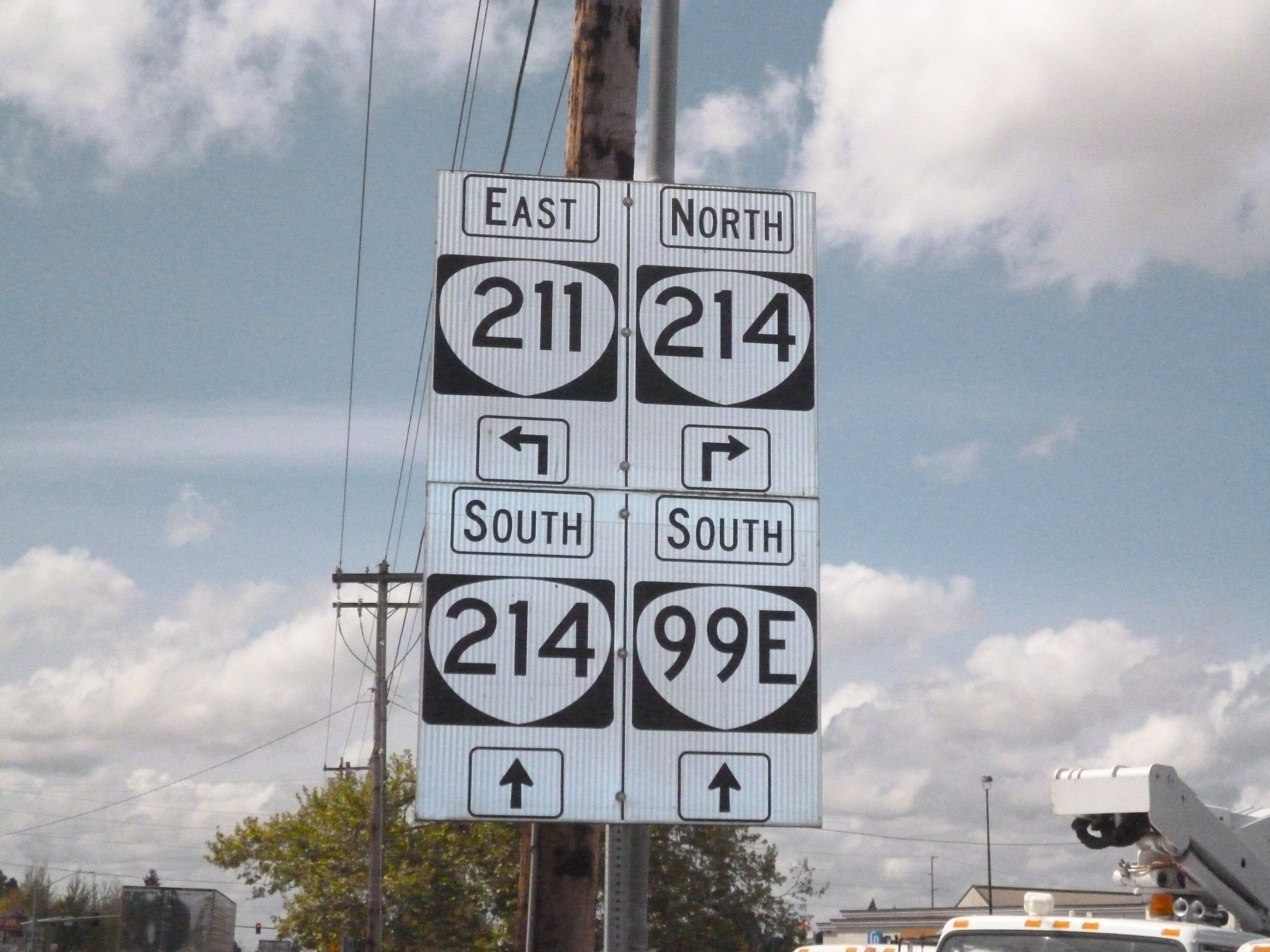
Oregon 99E, 211 and 214 Direction Sign

== Major intersections ==
The entire route is in Marion County.

Location	mi	km	Destinations	Notes
	0.00	0.00	OR 22 – Salem, Stayton	
Silverton	32.07– 32.21	51.61– 51.84	OR 213 – Salem, Stayton, Mollala, Oregon City	
Woodburn	43.40	69.85	OR 99E south	Southern end of OR 99E overlap
Woodburn	44.57	71.73	OR 99E north / OR 211 north	Northern end of OR 99E overlap
Woodburn	47.07	75.75	I-5 – Salem, Portland OR 219 north	Roadway continues as OR 219
1.000 mi = 1.609 km; 1.000 km = 0.621 mi: Concurrency terminus
