= Oregon Route 211 =

State highway in northwestern Oregon, US

Oregon Route 211
- Route 211 highlighted in red

Route information
- Maintained by ODOT
- Length: 44.91 mi (72.28 km)
- Existed: 1935–present

Major junctions
- South end: OR 99E / OR 214 in Woodburn
- OR 213 in Mollalla; OR 224 near Estacada
- North end: US 26 in Sandy

Location
- Country: United States
- State: Oregon
- Counties: Clackamas, Marion

Highway system
- Oregon Highways; Interstate; US; State; Named; Scenic
| ← OR 210 | → OR 212 |

Oregon Route 211 is a state highway which runs through part of the northeastern portion of Oregon's Willamette Valley. Its northeastern terminus is its intersection with U.S. Route 26 in Sandy, a small town on the outskirts of the Portland metro area. It runs south and west, through farmland and forest, to its southwestern terminus with OR 99E in Woodburn. After its intersection with OR 99E, a short segment (about 2 miles; 3.2 km) of Oregon Route 214 connects OR 211 with Interstate 5.

A segment (about 5.5 miles; 8.9 km) of OR 211 north of Estacada is shared with OR 224.

OR 211 comprises the Eagle Creek-Sandy Highway No. 172 (see Oregon highways and routes), part of the Clackamas Highway No. 171 (over the concurrency with OR 224), and the Woodburn-Estacada Highway No. 161.

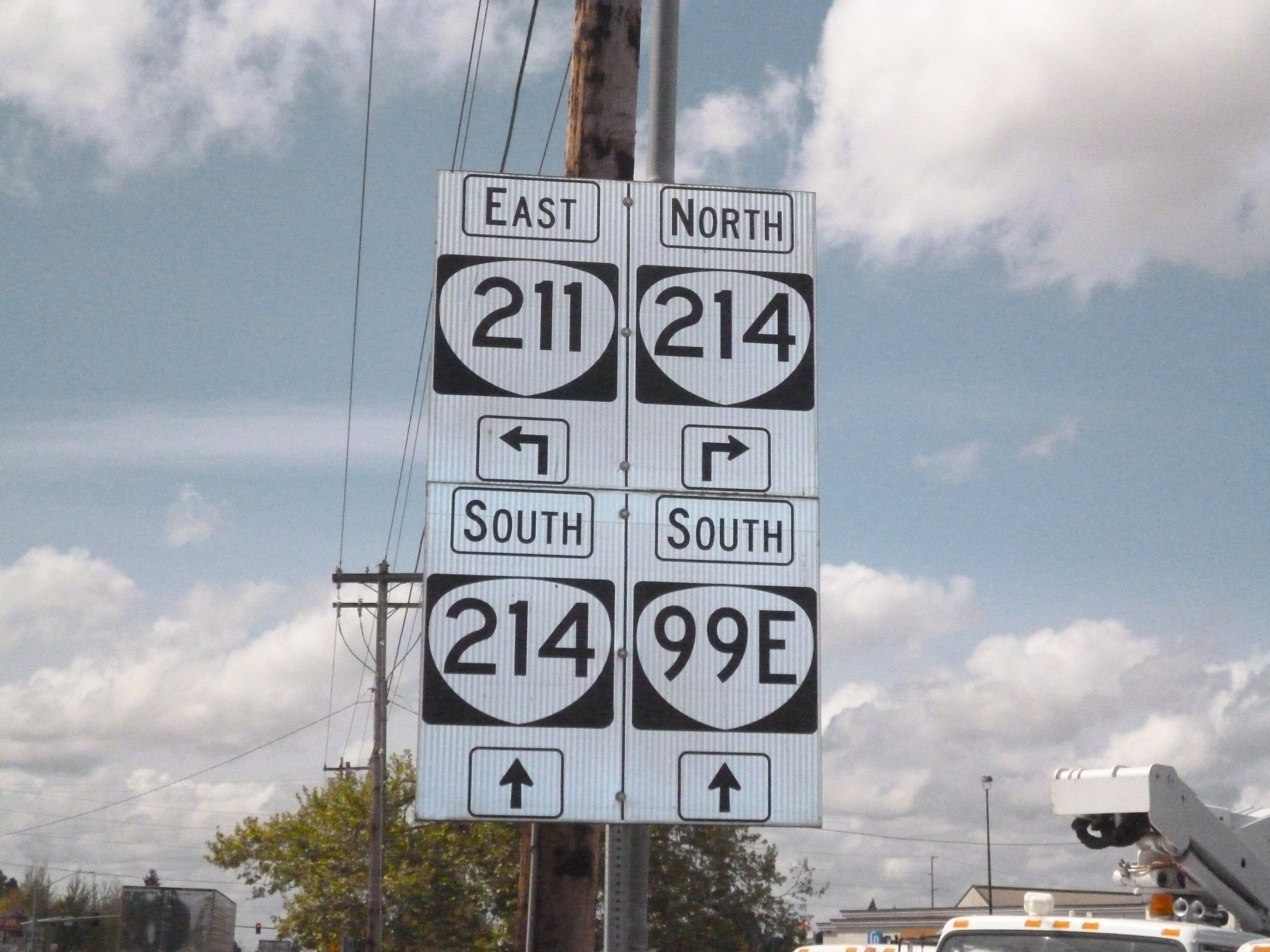
Oregon 99E, 211 and 214 direction sign

== Major intersections ==
| County | Location | mi | km | Destinations | Notes |
|---|---|---|---|---|---|
| Marion | Woodburn | 0.00 | 0.00 | OR 99E / OR 214 south – Canby, Silverton OR 214 north – Newberg | Roadway continues as northbound OR 214 |
| Clackamas | Molalla | 11.21 | 18.04 | OR 213 – Oregon City, Silverton | |
| Clackamas | Estacada | 33.30 | 53.59 | OR 224 east – North Fork Lake | Southern end of OR 224 overlap |
| Clackamas | Eagle Creek | 38.74 | 62.35 | OR 224 west – Oregon City, Portland | Northern end of OR 224 overlap |
| Clackamas | Sandy | 44.85 | 72.18 | US 26 east (Pioneer Boulevard) – Mount Hood | One-way couplet |
| Clackamas | Sandy | 44.91 | 72.28 | US 26 west (Proctor Boulevard) – Gresham, Portland | One-way couplet |
1.000 mi = 1.609 km; 1.000 km = 0.621 mi: Concurrency terminus
