= Damascus, Oregon =

Unincorporated community in Oregon, United States

Damascus
- Census-designated place
- Damascus, Oregon
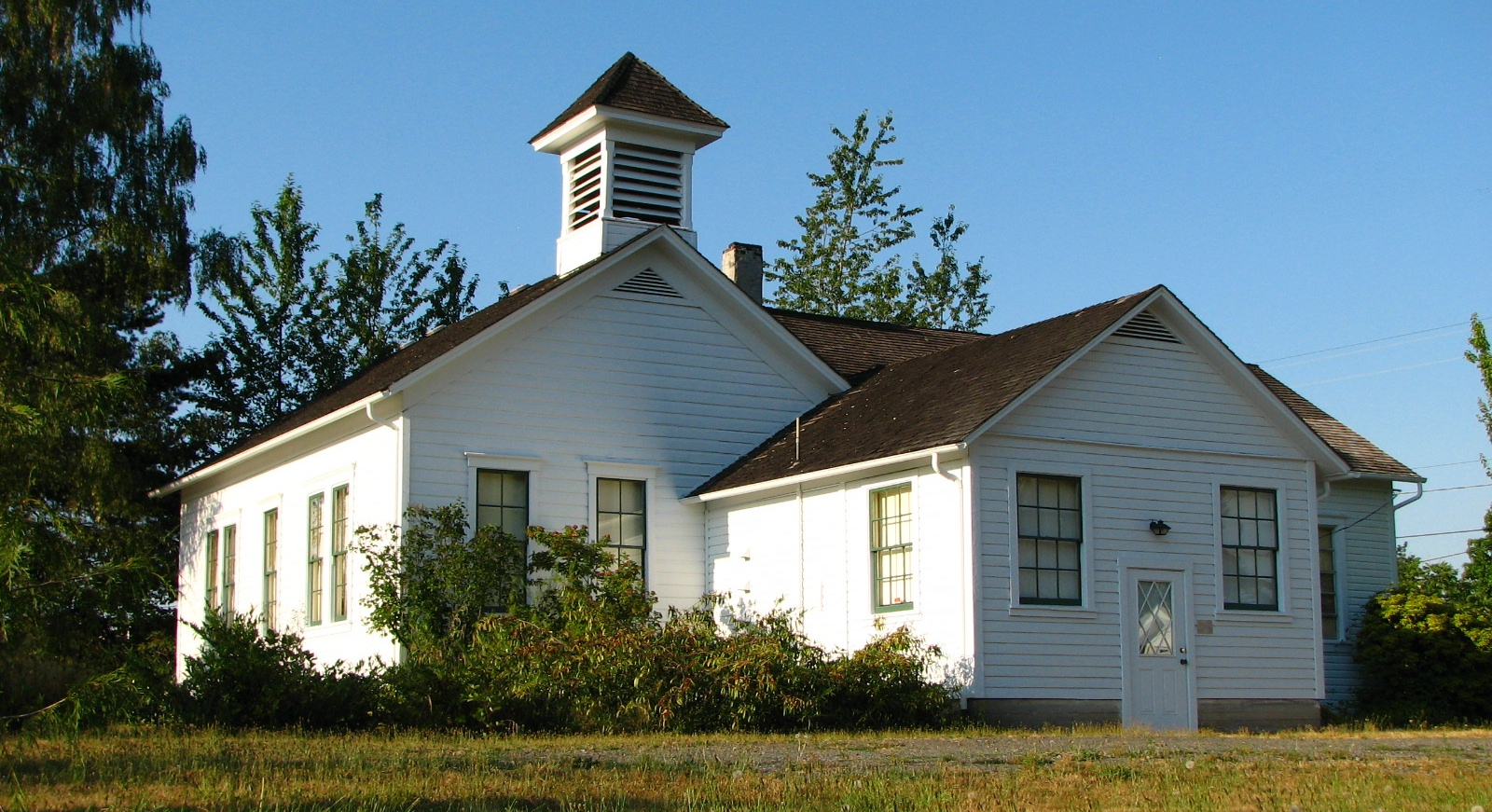
- Old Damascus schoolhouse

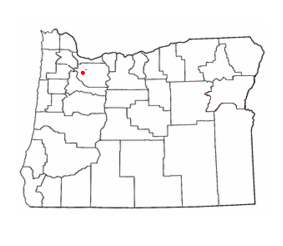
- Location in Oregon
- Coordinates: 45°25′47″N 122°26′46″W
- Country: United States
- State: Oregon
- County: Clackamas
- Incorporated: 2004

Area
  - Total: 16.14 sq mi (41.80 km^{2})
  - Land: 16.04 sq mi (41.54 km^{2})
  - Water: 0.10 sq mi (0.26 km^{2})
- Elevation: 712 ft (217 m)

Population (2020)
  - Total: 11,050
  - Density: 657/sq mi (253.7/km^{2})
- Time zone: UTC-8 (Pacific)
  - Summer (DST): UTC-7 (Pacific)
- ZIP codes: 97009, 97015, 97030, 97080, 97089
- Area codes: 503 and 971
- GNIS feature ID: 2410292

Damascus (/dəˈmæskəs/ də-MAS-kəs) is a census-designated place and former city in Clackamas County, Oregon, United States. Established in 1867, it was incorporated in 2004 in an effort to enable local land use decision-making control by the community. The citizens voted to disincorporate in 2016, and, after a legal challenge, disincorporation was completed in 2020. Damascus is located east of Happy Valley and Interstate 205 and west of Boring. The population was 11,050 residents as of the 2020 census.

== History ==
According to Oregon Geographic Names, Damascus can date its existence as a community back to 1867, when a post office by that name was established. That post office was closed in 1904. The original heart of the community is along Oregon Route 212, which as of 2004 served as part of the city's southern boundary.

A 2000 decision by Metro to expand Portland's urban growth boundary into the area prompted some citizens of the community to submit Measure 3-138, a measure on the ballot for the 2004 general election in November. The initiative's passage resulted in the incorporation of the former unincorporated communities of Damascus and Carver into the City of Damascus, a step which prevented nearby cities from annexing the community. The city was the first new city in Oregon in 22 years.

In a special election on September 21, 2005, a city charter was approved by 88% of voters. Voters in eleven parcels of land between Damascus and Happy Valley were given the chance to vote on annexation to Damascus: six of the areas voted for annexation, four voted against, and in the eleventh no votes were cast.

As a city, Damascus went through seven city managers in eight years, and generally had a contentious existence as a municipality. This included a vote to disincorporate the city and to recall the mayor in 2013.

In the May 17, 2016, primary, the citizens of Damascus voted a second time on a proposal to disincorporate. This time, the proposal was approved, and the city ostensibly ceased to exist on July 18, 2016. However, the disincorporation was nullified by the Oregon Appellate Court on May 1, 2019. The court held that the voter turnout did not reach the State's fifty percent threshold and therefore should have been invalidated back in 2016. On September 3, 2020, the Oregon Supreme Court reinstated the disincorporation vote of 2016 and the city no longer exists. What was once the City of Damascus is now unincorporated territory in Clackamas County.

== Geography ==
Damascus sits 712 feet (217 m) above sea level. Located in north-central part of Clackamas County, the former city's northern boundary was the Multnomah County line. Boring lies to the east, and Clackamas to the west.

According to the United States Census Bureau, the city had a total area of 16.14 square miles (41.80 km^{2}), of which 16.04 square miles (41.54 km^{2}) was land and 0.10 square miles (0.26 km^{2}) was water.

== Demographics ==
Historical population
Census	Pop.	Note	%±
2000	9,022		—
2010	10,539		16.8%
2020	11,050		4.8%
U.S. Decennial Census

=== 2020 census ===
As of the 2020 census, Damascus had a population of 11,050. The median age was 44.2 years. 22.0% of residents were under the age of 18 and 21.0% of residents were 65 years of age or older. For every 100 females there were 100.5 males, and for every 100 females age 18 and over there were 99.2 males age 18 and over.

78.7% of residents lived in urban areas, while 21.3% lived in rural areas.

There were 3,659 households in Damascus, of which 32.6% had children under the age of 18 living in them. Of all households, 70.5% were married-couple households, 10.8% were households with a male householder and no spouse or partner present, and 13.9% were households with a female householder and no spouse or partner present. About 13.9% of all households were made up of individuals and 8.3% had someone living alone who was 65 years of age or older.

There were 3,769 housing units, of which 2.9% were vacant. The homeowner vacancy rate was 0.5% and the rental vacancy rate was 5.2%.

Racial composition as of the 2020 census
Race	Number	Percentage
White	9,077	82.1%
Black or African American	93	0.8%
American Indian and Alaska Native	90	0.8%
Asian	441	4.0%
Native Hawaiian and Other Pacific Islander	35	0.3%
Some other race	362	3.3%
Two or more races	952	8.6%
Hispanic or Latino (of any race)	895	8.1%

=== 2010 census ===
As of the census of 2010, there were 10,539 people, 3,621 households, and 2,984 families residing in the city. The population density was 657.0 inhabitants per square mile (253.7/km^{2}). There were 3,769 housing units at an average density of 235.0 per square mile (90.7/km^{2}). The racial makeup of the city was 91.3% White, 0.6% African American, 0.6% Native American, 3.4% Asian, 0.2% Pacific Islander, 1.2% from other races, and 2.6% from two or more races. Hispanic or Latino of any race were 4.4% of the population.

There were 3,621 households, of which 36.7% had children under the age of 18 living with them, 72.5% were married couples living together, 6.2% had a female householder with no husband present, 3.8% had a male householder with no wife present, and 17.6% were non-families. 12.5% of all households were made up of individuals, and 4.6% had someone living alone who was 65 years of age or older. The average household size was 2.90 and the average family size was 3.16.

The median age in the city was 43.2 years. 25% of residents were under the age of 18; 6.8% were between the ages of 18 and 24; 20.6% were from 25 to 44; 34.2% were from 45 to 64; and 13.3% were 65 years of age or older. The gender makeup of the city was 50.8% male and 49.2% female.

== Government ==
Fire protection in Damascus is provided by Clackamas County Fire District #1 (CCFD1). One fire station, Fire Station 19 - Damascus, is located in the community, with emergency response also from nearby CCFD1 Station 7 - Pleasant Valley and CCFD1 Fire Station 14 - Boring. Damascus is served by the North Clackamas, Oregon Trail, Estacada, Centennial, and Gresham-Barlow school districts. The latter is the second-largest employer in the community.
