= Happy Valley, Oregon =

- City
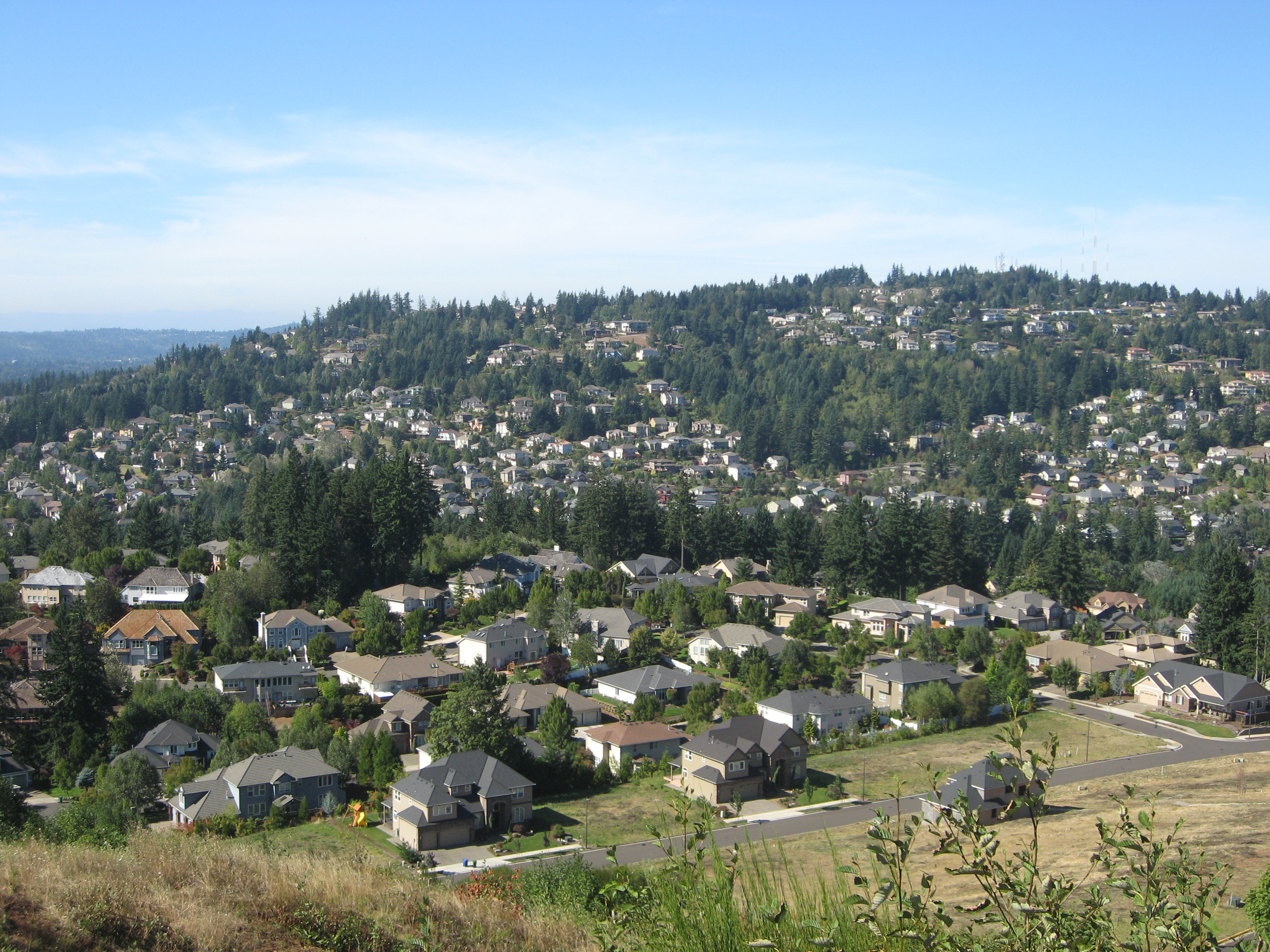
- Happy Valley, on the southeast flank of Mount Scott

- Location of Happy Valley, Oregon
- Coordinates: 45°26′9.28″N 122°30′29.22″W
- Country: United States
- State: Oregon
- County: Clackamas
- Founded: mid-1800's
- Incorporated: 1965

Government
  - Mayor: Tom Ellis
  - Councilmembers: Brett Sherman; Glenn Wachter; David Golobay; Joshua Callahan

Area
  - Total: 11.965 sq mi (30.989 km^{2})
  - Land: 11.905 sq mi (30.833 km^{2})
  - Water: 0.059 sq mi (0.154 km^{2})
- Elevation: 643 ft (196 m)

Population (2020)
  - Total: 23,733
  - Estimate (2023): 28,409
  - Density: 2,449.1/sq mi (945.59/km^{2})
- Time zone: UTC–8 (Pacific (PST))
  - Summer (DST): UTC–7 (PDT)
- ZIP Code: 97086
- Area codes: 503 and 971
- FIPS code: 41-32050
- GNIS feature ID: 2410698
- Website: happyvalleyor.gov

Happy Valley is a suburban city in the Portland metropolitan area. Happy Valley is near the northwest edge of Clackamas County, Oregon, United States approximately 13 miles to the southeast of downtown Portland. The population was 23,733 at the 2020 census, According to 2023 census estimates, the city is estimated to have a population of 28,409. Camp Withycombe is located within the official city limits of Happy Valley, Oregon and it annexed into the city's jurisdiction.

== History ==
Happy Valley was originally settled by Christian and Matilda Deardorff after receiving 640 acres from The Donation Land Claim Act of 1850 in Clackamas County between a cinder cone volcano later name Mt. Scott and a knoll later named Scouters' Mountain. The settled region become known as Deardorff Valley, Deardorff Settlement and most popularly Christilla Valley (name formed by combining "Chris" from Christian and "Tilla" from Matilda).

The city was officially incorporated in 1965 and remained a small community until the late 1990s, when it became one of the fastest-growing cities in Oregon.

== Geography ==
According to the United States Census Bureau, the city has a total area of 11.965 square miles (30.99 km^{2}), of which 11.905 square miles (30.83 km^{2}) is land and 0.060 square miles (0.16 km^{2}) is water. It is a member of the Portland metropolitan area, bordering Portland, Clackamas, Damascus, Pleasant Valley, and Sunnyside.

Mount Scott, an extinct volcano that is part of the Boring Lava Field, is the highest point in Happy Valley at 1,050 feet (320 m). Scouters Mountain is also a prominent feature.

=== Climate ===
Happy Valley experiences much rain in the Portland metro area, with a recorded annual rainfall average of 48 inches.

== Demographics ==
Historical population
Census	Pop.	Note	%±
1970	1,392		—
1980	1,499		7.7%
1990	1,519		1.3%
2000	4,519		197.5%
2010	13,903		207.7%
2020	23,733		70.7%
2023 (est.)	28,409		19.7%
U.S. Decennial Census; 2020 Census

As of the 2023 American Community Survey, there are 8,701 estimated households in Happy Valley with an average of 2.93 persons per household. The city has a median household income of $120,324. Approximately 6.9% of the city's population lives at or below the poverty line. Happy Valley has an estimated 67.4% employment rate, with 46.4% of the population holding a bachelor's degree or higher and 94.7% holding a high school diploma.

The top five reported ancestries (people were allowed to report up to two ancestries, thus the figures will generally add to more than 100%) were English (79.6%), Spanish (4.2%), Indo-European (3.8%), Asian and Pacific Islander (11.2%), and Other (1.2%).

The median age in the city was 39.7 years.

=== Racial and ethnic composition ===
Happy Valley, Oregon – racial and ethnic composition Note: the US Census treats Hispanic/Latino as an ethnic category. This table excludes Latinos from the racial categories and assigns them to a separate category. Hispanics/Latinos may be of any race.
Race / ethnicity (NH = non-Hispanic)	Pop. 2000	Pop. 2010	Pop. 2020	% 2000	% 2010	% 2020
White alone (NH)	3,896	10,267	15,402	86.21%	73.85%	64.90%
Black or African American alone (NH)	32	138	408	0.71%	0.99%	1.72%
Native American or Alaska Native alone (NH)	13	60	72	0.29%	0.43%	0.30%
Asian alone (NH)	396	2,406	4,682	8.76%	17.31%	19.73%
Pacific Islander alone (NH)	7	19	58	0.15%	0.14%	0.24%
Other race alone (NH)	8	18	137	0.18%	0.13%	0.58%
Mixed race or multiracial (NH)	82	432	1,406	1.81%	3.11%	5.92%
Hispanic or Latino (any race)	85	563	1,568	1.88%	4.05%	6.61%
Total	4,519	13,903	23,733	100.00%	100.00%	100.00%

=== 2020 census ===
As of the 2020 census, there were 23,733 people, 7,813 households, and 6,233 families residing in the city. The population density was 2,050.4 inhabitants per square mile (791.7/km^{2}). There were 8,081 housing units at an average density of 698.1 per square mile (269.5/km^{2}).

The median age was 38.2 years, with 27.3% of residents under the age of 18 and 12.6% of residents who were 65 years of age or older. For every 100 females there were 97.0 males, and for every 100 females age 18 and over there were 93.4 males age 18 and over.

98.9% of residents lived in urban areas, while 1.1% lived in rural areas.

There were 7,813 households in Happy Valley, of which 44.2% had children under the age of 18 living in them. Of all households, 65.2% were married-couple households, 11.0% were households with a male householder and no spouse or partner present, and 18.5% were households with a female householder and no spouse or partner present. About 15.3% of all households were made up of individuals and 6.1% had someone living alone who was 65 years of age or older.

Of the 8,081 housing units, 3.3% were vacant. Among occupied housing units, 78.5% were owner-occupied and 21.5% were renter-occupied. The homeowner vacancy rate was 1.3% and the rental vacancy rate was 4.4%.

Racial composition as of the 2020 census
Race	Number	Percent
White	15,810	66.6%
Black or African American	429	1.8%
American Indian and Alaska Native	94	0.4%
Asian	4,699	19.8%
Native Hawaiian and Other Pacific Islander	61	0.3%
Some other race	500	2.1%
Two or more races	2,140	9.0%
Hispanic or Latino (of any race)	1,568	6.6%

=== 2010 census ===
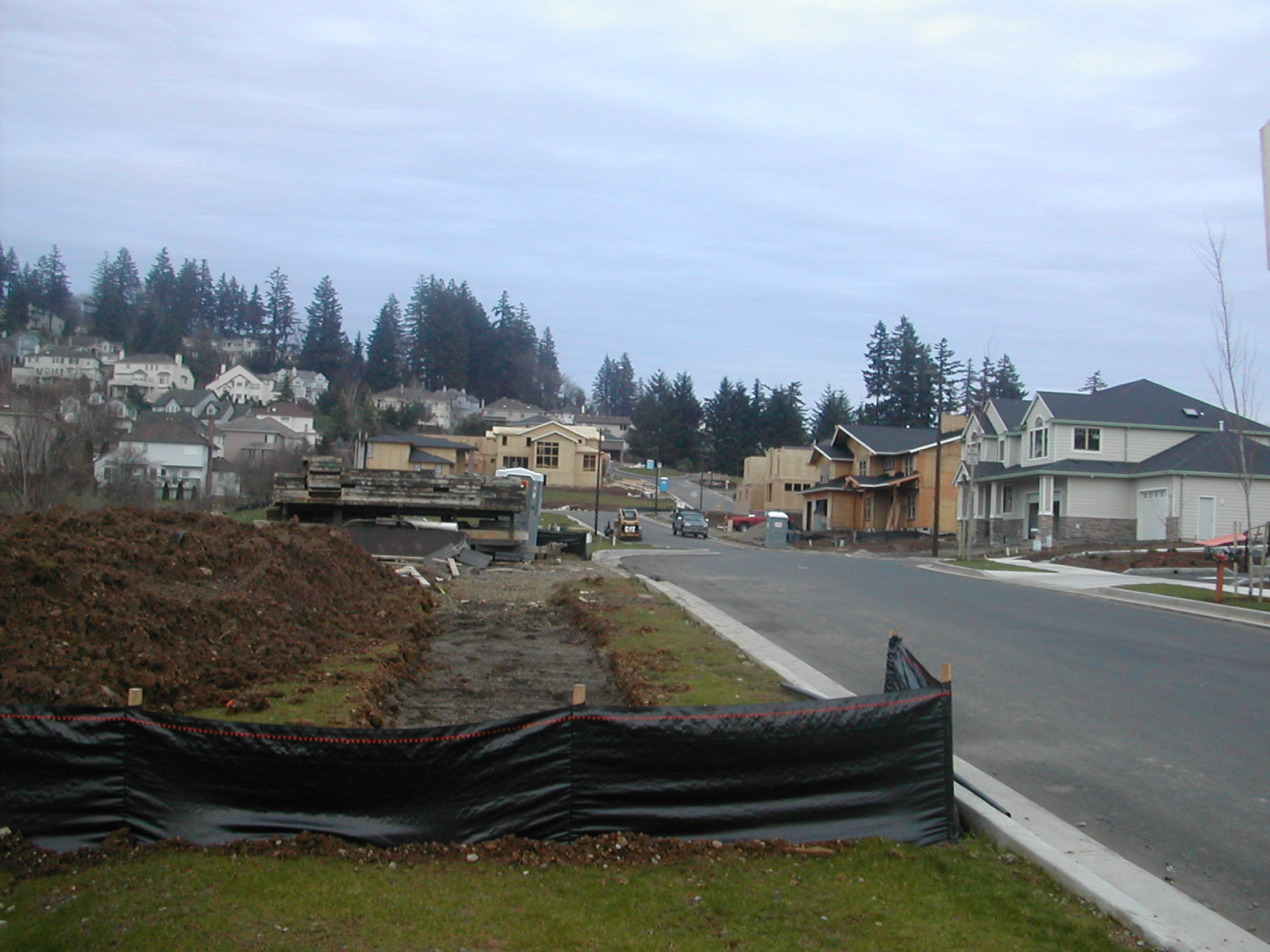
The rapid growth of Happy Valley led to the construction of many new housing developments

As of the 2010 census, there were 13,903 people, 4,408 households, and 3,724 families living in the city. The population density was 1,678.5 inhabitants per square mile (648.1/km^{2}). There were 4,708 housing units at an average density of 568.6 per square mile (219.5/km^{2}). The racial makeup of the city was 76.17% White, 1.08% African American, 0.49% Native American, 17.38% Asian, 0.15% Pacific Islander, 0.95% from some other races and 3.78% from two or more races. Hispanic or Latino people of any race were 4.05% of the population.

There were 4,408 households, of which 48.8% had children under the age of 18 living with them, 74.4% were married couples living together, 6.3% had a female householder with no husband present, 3.7% had a male householder with no wife present, and 15.5% were non-families. 11.0% of all households were made up of individuals, and 3% had someone living alone who was 65 years of age or older. The average household size was 3.15 and the average family size was 3.40.

The median age in the city was 37 years. 30.2% of residents were under the age of 18; 6.8% were between the ages of 18 and 24; 27% were from 25 to 44; 27.9% were from 45 to 64; and 8.2% were 65 years of age or older. The gender makeup of the city was 49.7% male and 50.3% female.

=== 2000 census ===
As of the 2000 census, there were 4,519 people, 1,431 households, and 1,302 families living in the city. The population density was 1,674.2 inhabitants per square mile (646.4/km^{2}). There were 1,500 housing units at an average density of 555.7 per square mile (214.6/km^{2}). The racial makeup of the city was 87.39% White, 0.77% African American, 0.29% Native American, 8.85% Asian, 0.15% Pacific Islander, 0.44% from some other races and 2.10% from two or more races. Hispanic or Latino people of any race were 1.88% of the population.

There were 1,431 households, out of which 49.0% had children under the age of 18 living with them, 83.4% were married couples living together, 4.9% had a female householder with no husband present, and 9.0% were non-families. 6.3% of all households were made up of individuals, and 2.2% had someone living alone who was 65 years of age or older. The average household size was 3.16 and the average family size was 3.28.

In the city, the population was spread out, with 31.4% under the age of 18, 5.0% from 18 to 24, 30.1% from 25 to 44, 26.7% from 45 to 64, and 6.8% who were 65 years of age or older. The median age was 37 years. For every 100 females, there were 99.2 males. For every 100 females age 18 and over, there were 98.2 males.

The median income for a household in the city was $93,131, and the median income for a family was $95,922. Males had a median income of $68,125 versus $43,667 for females. The per capita income for the city was $36,665. About 0.6% of families and 1.2% of the population were below the poverty line, including 1.2% of those under age 18 and none of those age 65 or over.

== Government ==
The City of Happy Valley is governed by the Happy Valley City Council which comprises a mayor (currently Tom Ellis), city council president (currently Joshua Callahan), and three other city council members (currently David Golobay, Brett Sherman, and Glenn Wachter). Mayor and Council members are elected to four year terms that are staggered to ensure at least two members are experienced at all times. There is also a planning commission, as well as a Park Advisory/Urban Forestry Commission and Citizen Traffic and Public Safety Committee.

== Education ==
Happy Valley is served by the North Clackamas School District. There are two high schools, two middle schools and eight elementary schools.

== Notable people ==
- Janelle Bynum, American politician
- Lori Chavez-DeRemer, American politician and former mayor of this city
- Hailey Kilgore, actress
- Bill Sizemore, American politician
- Nigel Williams-Goss, American professional basketball player
