= Clackamas, Oregon =

Unincorporated community in Oregon, US

- Former Census-designated place (CDP)
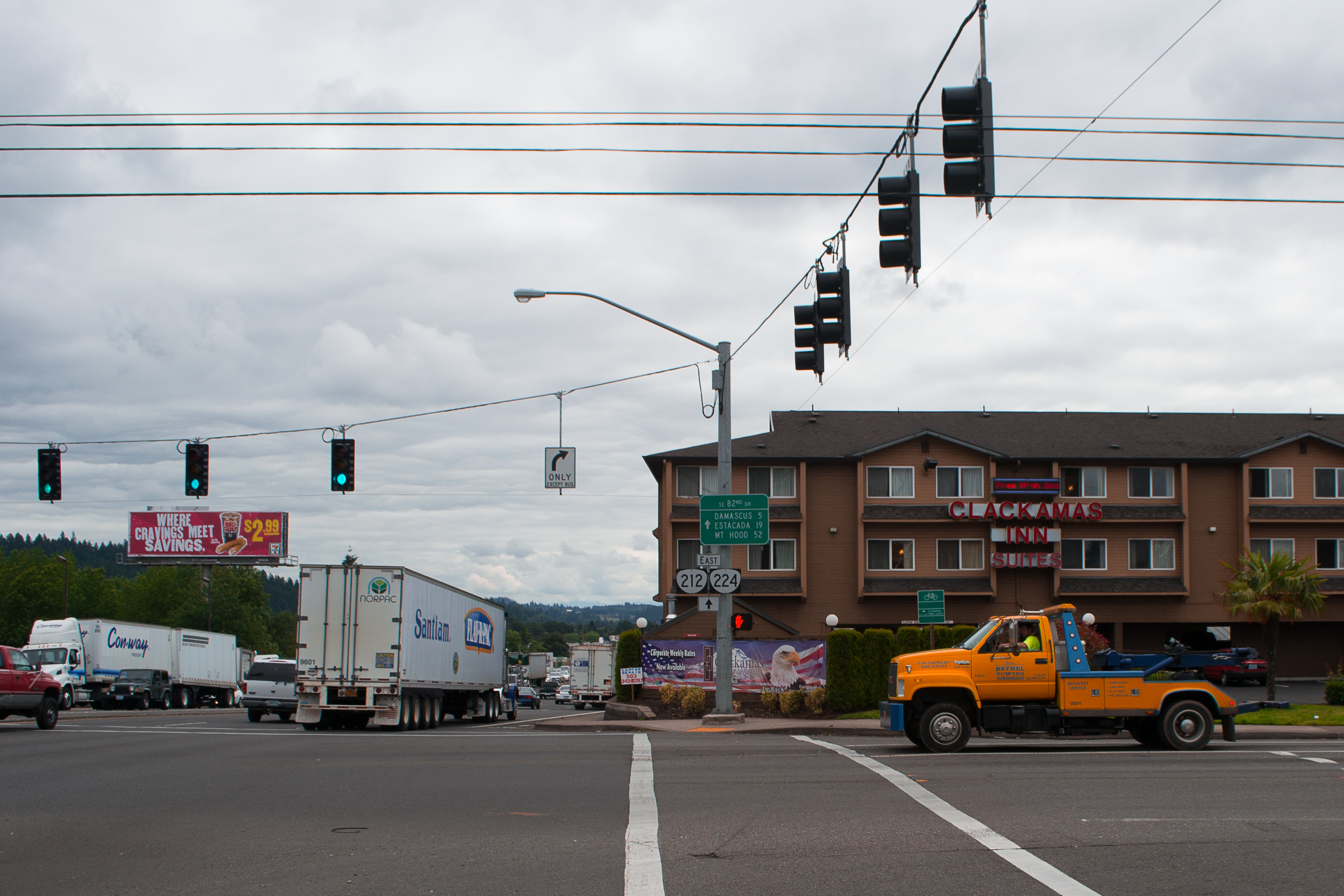
- Route 212 and SE 82nd Dr. in Clackamas, Oregon

- Location within Oregon Location within the United States
- Coordinates: 45°24′44″N 122°33′16″W
- Country: United States
- State: Oregon
- County: Clackamas
- Established: 1843

Area
  - Total: 2.18 sq mi (5.65 km^{2})
  - Land: 2.18 sq mi (5.65 km^{2})
  - Water: 0 sq mi (0.0 km^{2})
- Elevation: 121 ft (37 m)

Population (2010)
  - Total: 6,965
  - Density: 3,193/sq mi (1,232.7/km^{2})
- Time zone: UTC-8 (Pacific (PST))
  - Summer (DST): UTC-7 (PDT)
- ZIP code: 97015
- Area code: 503
- FIPS code: 41-13450
- GNIS feature ID: 2407626

Clackamas (/ˈklækəməs/ CLAK-ə-məss) is an unincorporated community and former census-designated place (CDP) in Clackamas County, Oregon, United States, and is a suburb of Portland. The population was approximately 7,000 as of 2010.

Clackamas is adjacent to Happy Valley, which is home to Camp Withycombe, a National Guard and Reserve Center military base, and to a branch of Kaiser Permanente Hospital.

== Geography ==
Clackamas is part of the Portland Metropolitan Area and lies approximately 10 miles (16 km) southeast of downtown Portland and to the east of Interstate 205 along Oregon Routes 212 and 224 and to the north of the Clackamas River.

According to the United States Census Bureau, the CDP has a total area of 2.1 square miles (5.4 km^{2}), all of it land.

== Demographics ==
As of the census of 2000, there were 5,177 people, 2,000 households, and 1,336 families residing in the CDP. The population density was 2,425.3 inhabitants per square mile (936.4/km^{2}). There were 2,133 housing units at an average density of 999.3 per square mile (385.8/km^{2}). The racial makeup of the CDP was 85.28% White, 1.08% African American, 0.66% Native American, 6.32% Asian, 0.33% Pacific Islander, 2.70% from other races, and 3.63% from two or more races. Hispanic or Latino of any race were 5.95% of the population. 22.1% were of German, 10.8% English, 9.4% Irish and 6.3% American ancestry according to Census 2000.

There were 2,000 households, out of which 36.2% had children under the age of 18 living with them, 49.9% were married couples living together, 11.5% had a female householder with no husband present, and 33.2% were non-families. 25.5% of all households were made up of individuals, and 5.1% had someone living alone who was 65 years of age or older. The average household size was 2.58 and the average family size was 3.12.

In the CDP, the population was spread out, with 27.0% under the age of 18, 9.9% from 18 to 24, 34.1% from 25 to 44, 22.5% from 45 to 64, and 6.5% who were 65 years of age or older. The median age was 33 years. For every 100 females, there were 96.5 males. For every 100 females age 18 and over, there were 96.3 males.

The median income for a household in the CDP was $44,478, and the median income for a family was $50,607. Males had a median income of $40,614 versus $26,863 for females. The per capita income for the CDP was $21,672. About 8.2% of families and 9.4% of the population were below the poverty line, including 12.1% of those under age 18 and 8.6% of those age 65 or over.

== Education ==
Clackamas is served by the North Clackamas School District, split across the attendance areas for (west to east) Rex Putnam High School, Clackamas High School, and Adrienne C. Nelson High School.

== Transportation ==
=== Highways ===
Oregon Routes 212, 213 and 224 as well as Interstate 205 pass through Clackamas.

=== Public transportation ===
Clackamas is served by a number of TriMet bus lines and the MAX Light Rail Green Line.

=== Aerial transportation ===
Clackamas does not have a public airport; however, Portland International Airport (PDX) is approximately 15 miles (24 km) north.
