= Cascades station =

Light rail station in Portland, Oregon, U.S.

Cascades
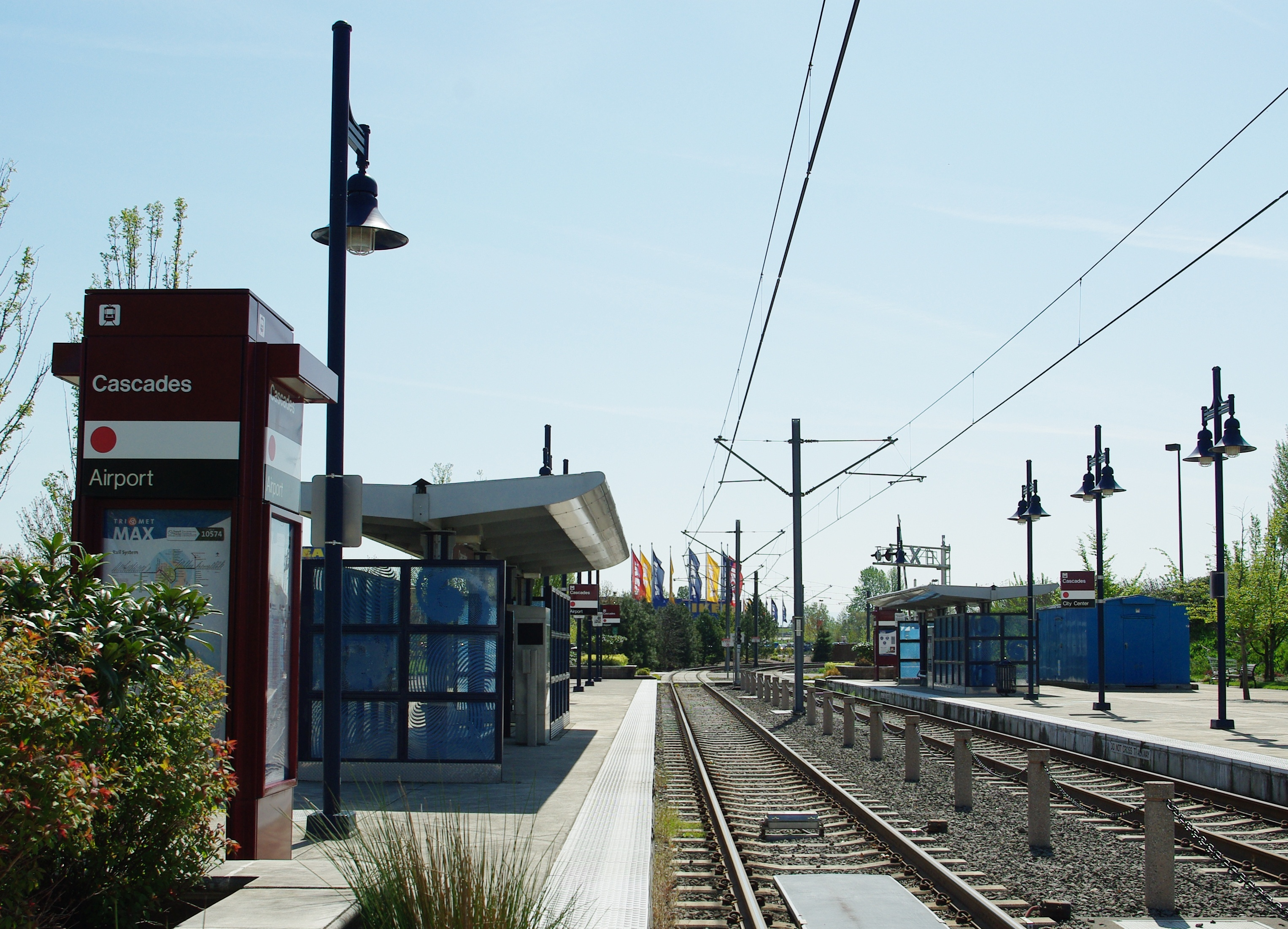
- Platforms from the west

General information
- Location: Northeast Cascades Parkway & Mount Saint Helens Avenue; Portland, Oregon; USA
- Coordinates: 45°34′20″N 122°33′29″W
- Owner: TriMet
- Platforms: 2 side platforms
- Tracks: 2

Construction
- Accessible: yes

History
- Opened: 2007

Services
Preceding station	TriMet	Following station
Parkrose/Sumner Transit Center toward Hillsboro Airport/Fairgrounds	Red Line	Mt Hood Ave toward Portland Airport
Location

Cascades is a light rail train station in the MAX Light Rail system. It is served by the Red Line and is located in Portland, Oregon; it is the third stop north on the Airport MAX section. When the line first opened, trains paused here in order to simulate a station stop for timetable purposes, but the stop was not announced nor were the doors opened. At that time, the station was expected to open in 2002, depending on progress with the planned Cascade Station mall after which the station was named. However, given the recession that followed the September 11 attacks, the start of construction of the mall was delayed. Work was finally underway in early 2007. In January 2007, the MAX stop finally opened.

The not-yet-opened station in 2002, when it had not yet been equipped with information displays or glass panels in its shelter frames, because there was no need for the station until the planned Cascade Station retail development was built

== See also ==
- Civic Drive MAX Station
