= Gresham City Hall station =

Light rail station in Gresham, Oregon, U.S.

Gresham City Hall
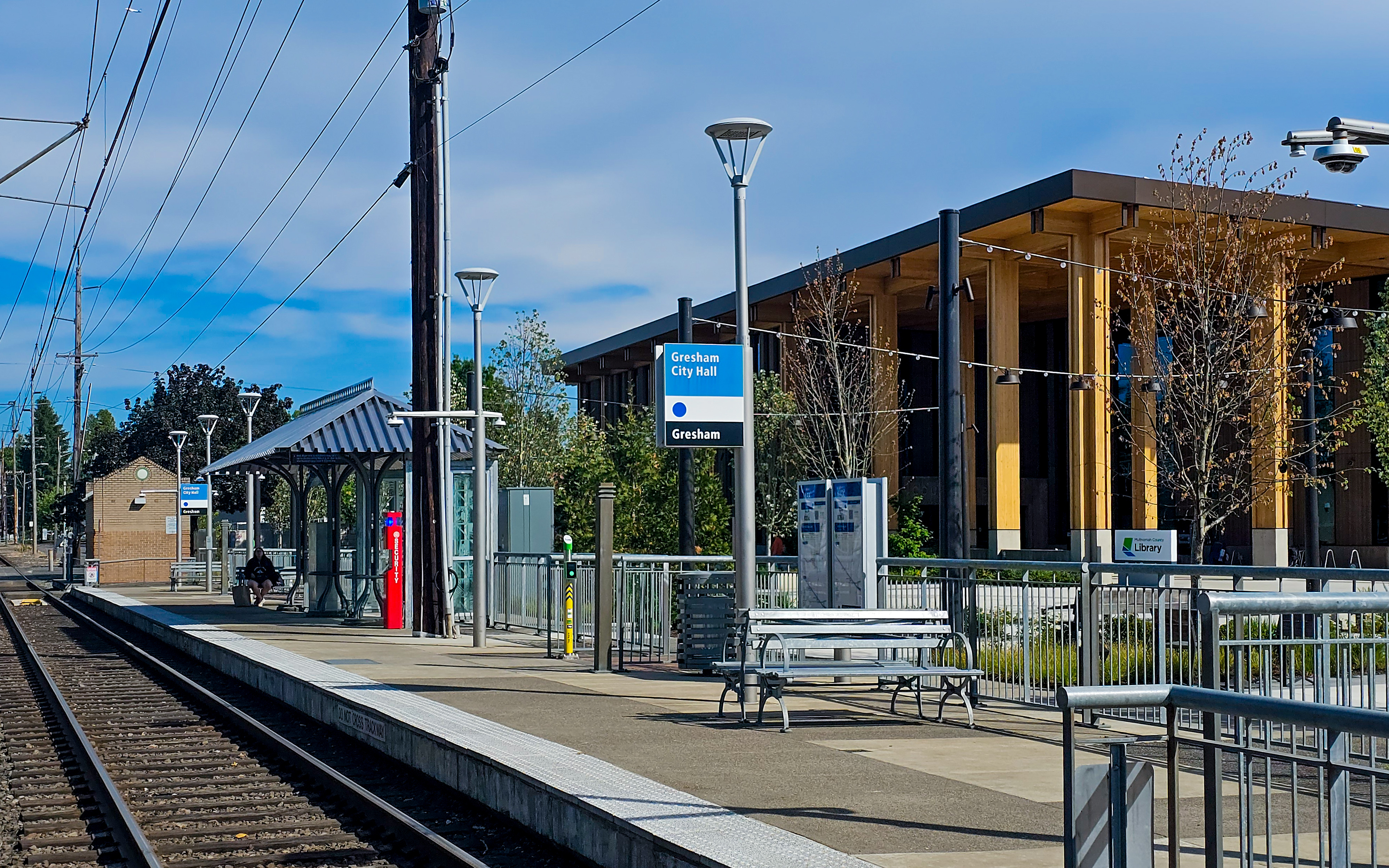
- Gresham City Hall station platform in 2026, with the East County Library in the background

General information
- Location: 1297 NE Eastman Parkway; Gresham, Oregon; U.S.
- Coordinates: 45°30′21″N 122°26′10″W
- Owner: TriMet
- Line: Eastside MAX
- Platforms: 2 side platforms
- Tracks: 2
- Connections: TriMet: FX2, 21

Construction
- Parking: None (previously 417 spaces)
- Cycle facilities: Racks
- Accessible: Yes

History
- Opened: September 5, 1986
- Rebuilt: 2017

Services
Preceding station	TriMet	Following station
Civic Drive toward Hatfield Government Center	Blue Line	Gresham Central Transit Center toward Cleveland Ave
Location

Gresham City Hall is a light rail station in Gresham, Oregon, United States, served by TriMet as part of MAX Light Rail. Located at the intersection of NW Division Street and NW Eastman Parkway, it is served by the Blue Line and is the 24th stop eastbound on the eastside MAX branch.

It is near the Gresham Station retail development. It is named for the adjacent Gresham city hall, which opened in October 1979 in a new building shared with school district offices.

The station was located in TriMet fare zone 4 from its opening in 1986 until September 1988, and in zone 3 from then until September 2012, at which time TriMet discontinued all use of zones in its fare structure.

In 2017, work on an extensive renovation of the then-31-year-old station began on January 23, and the station was scheduled to close completely for six weeks, beginning on February 26, 2017. The station reopened on April 2, 2017.

On June 16, 2023, TriMet closed Gresham City Hall station's park and ride to make way for the construction of East County Library.

== Bus service ==
As of August 23, 2026, this station is served by the following bus lines:

- FX2–Division
- 21–Sandy Blvd/223rd

Discontinued 8/23/26

- 82–South Gresham
