= Mt Hood Ave station =

Light rail station in Portland, Oregon

Mount Hood Ave
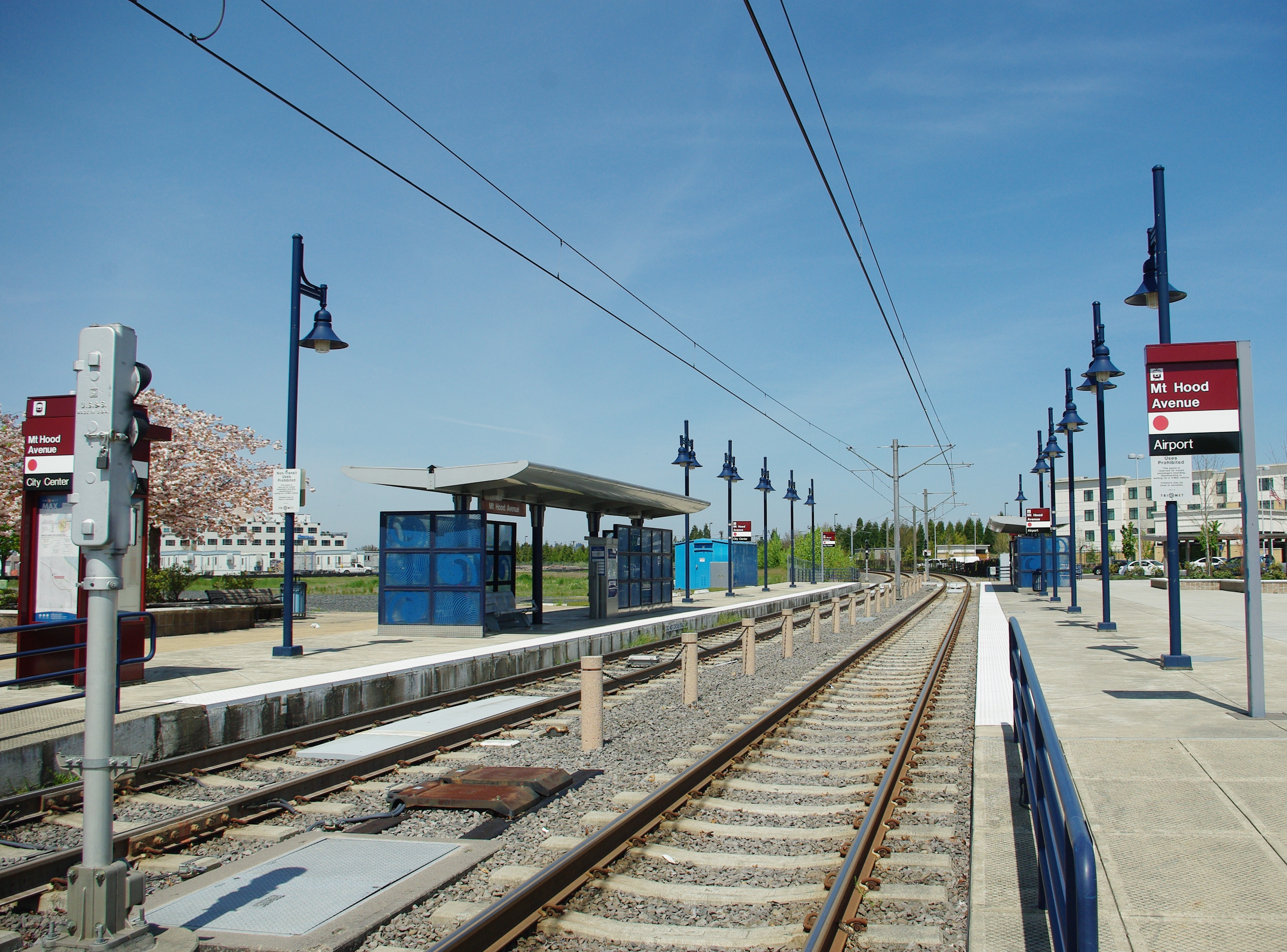
- Platform viewed from the east

General information
- Location: Northeast Cascades Parkway west of Mount Hood Avenue; Portland, Oregon; USA
- Coordinates: 45°34′38″N 122°34′02″W
- Owner: TriMet
- Platforms: 2 side platforms
- Tracks: 2

Construction
- Accessible: yes

History
- Opened: September 10, 2001

Services
Preceding station	TriMet	Following station
Cascades toward Hillsboro Airport/Fairgrounds	Red Line	Portland Airport Terminus
Location

Mount Hood Avenue station is a light rail station on the MAX Red Line in Portland, Oregon. Located at the northern end of the Cascade Station development, it is the 2nd stop north on the Airport MAX. The street for which it is named, Mount Hood Avenue, is located about 1,200 feet (370 m) southeast of the station. Mount Hood is approximately 40 miles (64.3 km) away from the station.
