= Civic Drive station =

Light rail station in Gresham, Oregon, US

Civic Drive
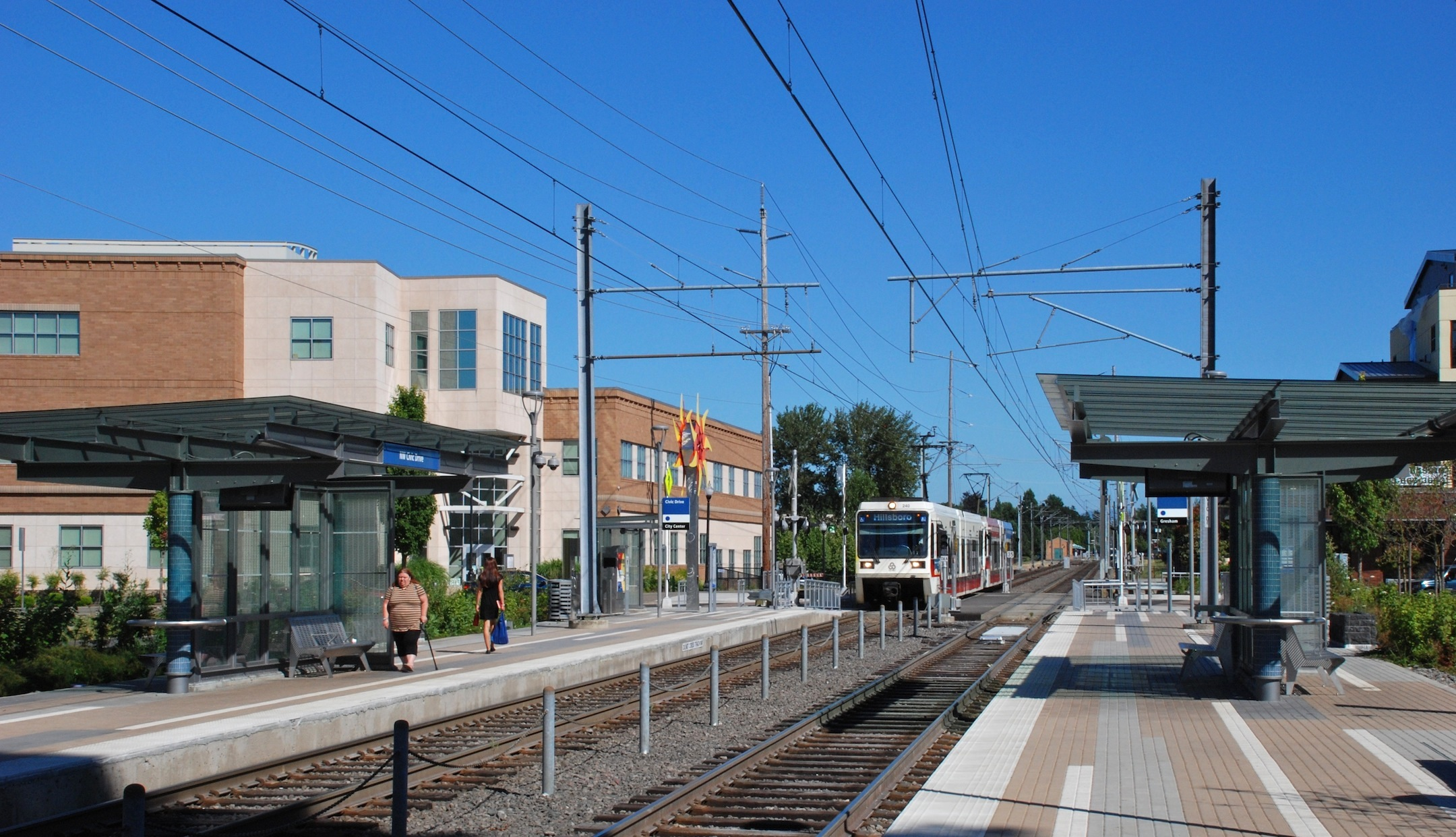
- Civic Drive station in 2011

General information
- Location: 1413 NW Civic Drive; Gresham, Oregon; USA
- Coordinates: 45°30′29″N 122°26′30″W
- Owner: TriMet
- Platforms: 2 side platforms
- Tracks: 2

Construction
- Parking: none
- Accessible: yes

History
- Opened: December 2010

Services
Preceding station	TriMet	Following station
Ruby Junction/East 197th Avenue toward Hatfield Government Center	Blue Line	Gresham City Hall toward Cleveland Ave
Location

Civic Drive station is a MAX light rail station in Gresham, Oregon, on the Blue Line and is the 23rd stop eastbound on the current Eastside MAX line. The station opened on December 1, 2010.

== History ==
The foundations for the station's platforms were laid in 1996, as part of a planned Gresham Civic neighborhood development included in a 1993 Downtown Gresham Plan. Due to a lack of finance and slower-than-expected development of the surrounding property, TriMet decided not to finish the station at that time. Its completion was postponed indefinitely, and the foundations were fenced off for safety reasons.

A March 2009 TriMet report included plans to resume construction of the station in summer 2009, for opening in fall 2010. Groundbreaking for the station occurred in May 2010; the total cost for the station is $3 million, including a $1.76 million construction budget. The street on which the station is located, and for which it is named, opened to traffic in June 2010.

The station was located in TriMet fare zone 3 from its opening in 2010 until September 2012, at which time TriMet discontinued all use of zones in its fare structure.

== Comparison to Cascades station ==
The situation was somewhat similar to that of the Cascades MAX station, on the Red Line, which was also built to serve a planned transit-oriented development, in 2001, but was then mothballed when the predicted development of the area did not materialize, and the Cascades MAX station did not finally open until late 2006. However, that station was fully completed in 2001 except for the fitting of ticket vending machines and glass in the frames of the shelters, whereas much less work was undertaken at Civic Drive station before being halted in 1998. Some development around this station site has taken place subsequently and includes stores, offices and residences.
