= Cascade Station =

Mixed-use development in Portland, Oregon, US

Coordinates: 45.572°N 122.559°W

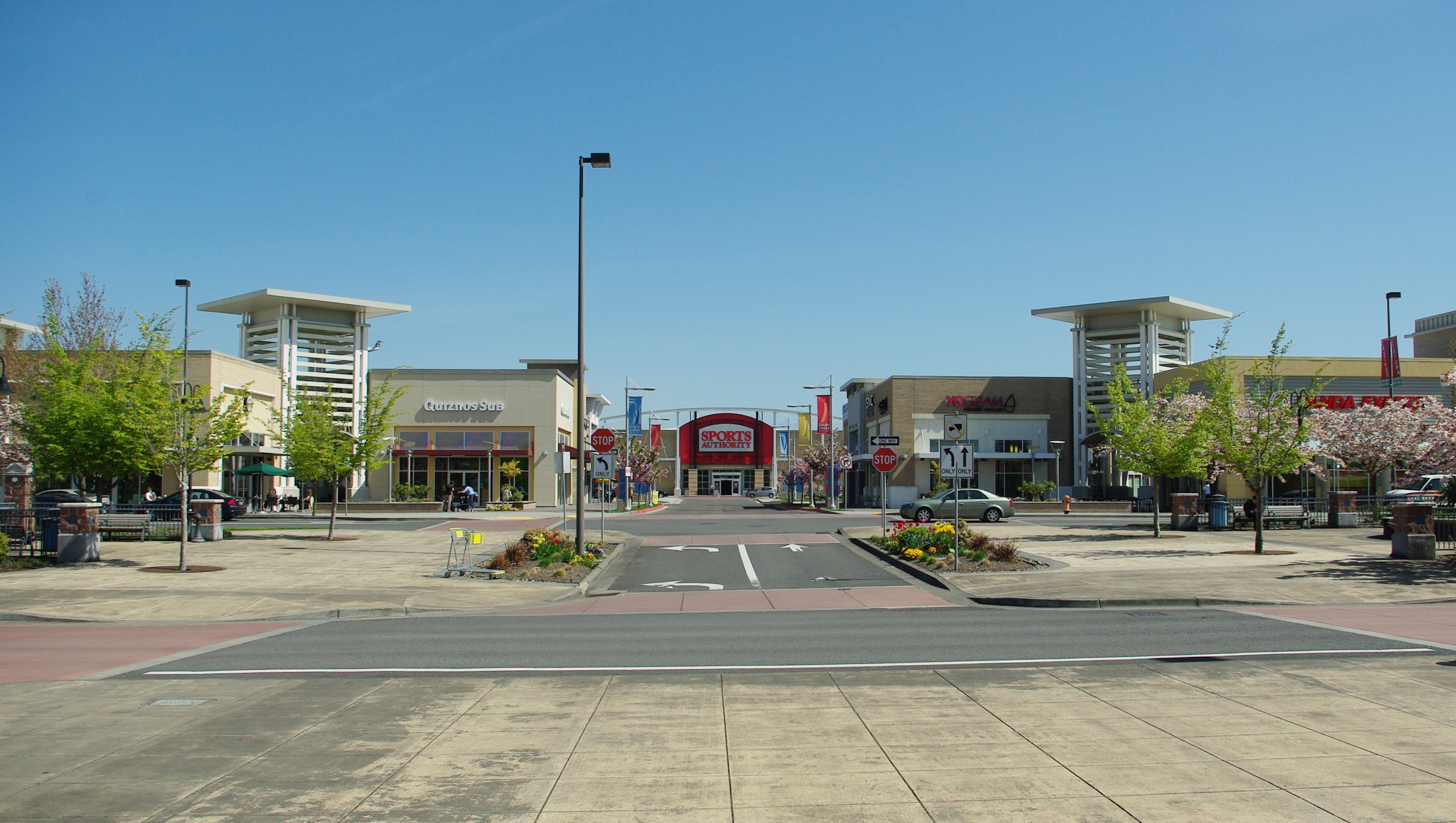
Sports Authority at the center

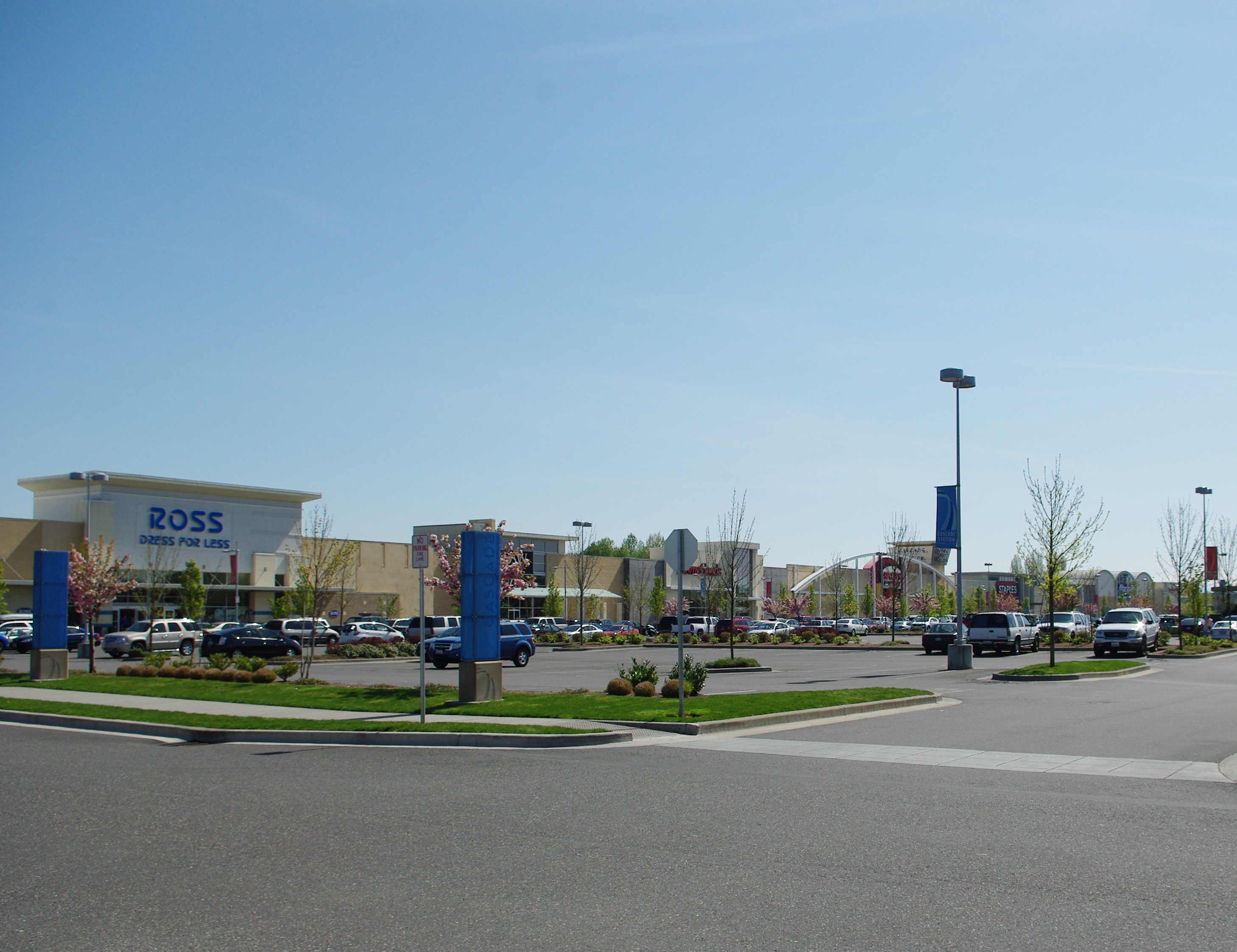

Cascade Station is a mixed-use development of a shopping center, office buildings, and hotels located in Northeast Portland, Oregon, along Airport Way and I-205, near Portland International Airport. It features 1,325,000 square feet (123,100 m^{2}) of office space, 1,200 hotel rooms and 400,000 square feet (37,000 m^{2}) of retail space, on 120-acre (0.49 km^{2}) land.

Cascade Station was proposed in 2001. Because of the timing of the project's announcement (September 10, 2001) and the recession that followed, the project stalled for several years and the streets built for it remained mostly empty. In 2005, IKEA signed on as the shopping center's first tenant, giving the project the boost it needed for construction to begin. Construction was underway by January 2007. The 280,000-square-foot (26,000 m^{2}) IKEA store opened on July 25, 2007.

== See also ==
- List of shopping malls in Oregon
- Cascades (MAX station)
- Mount Hood Avenue (MAX station)
