= MAX Light Rail =

Light rail system in Portland, Oregon since 1986

Metropolitan Area Express

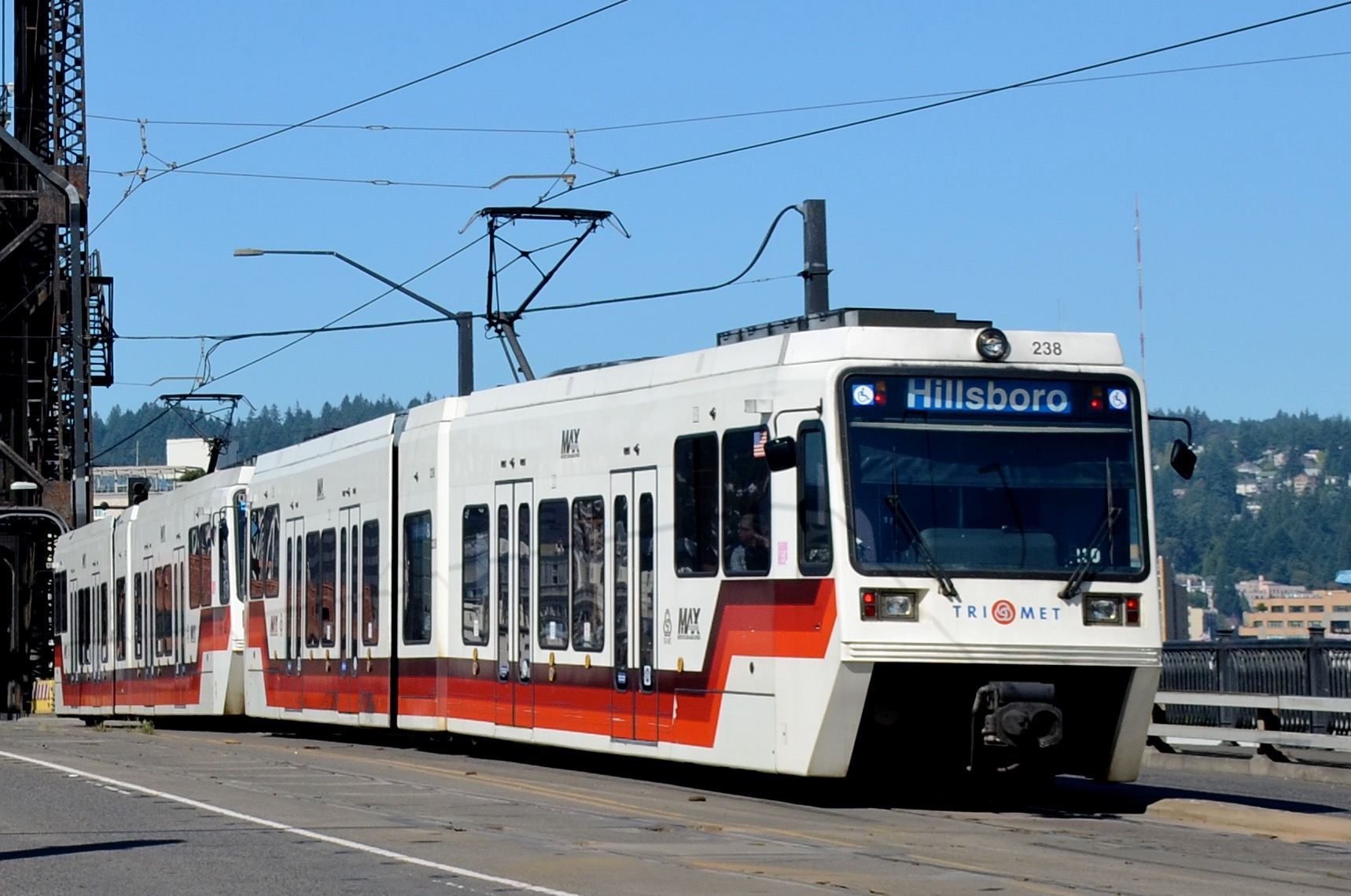

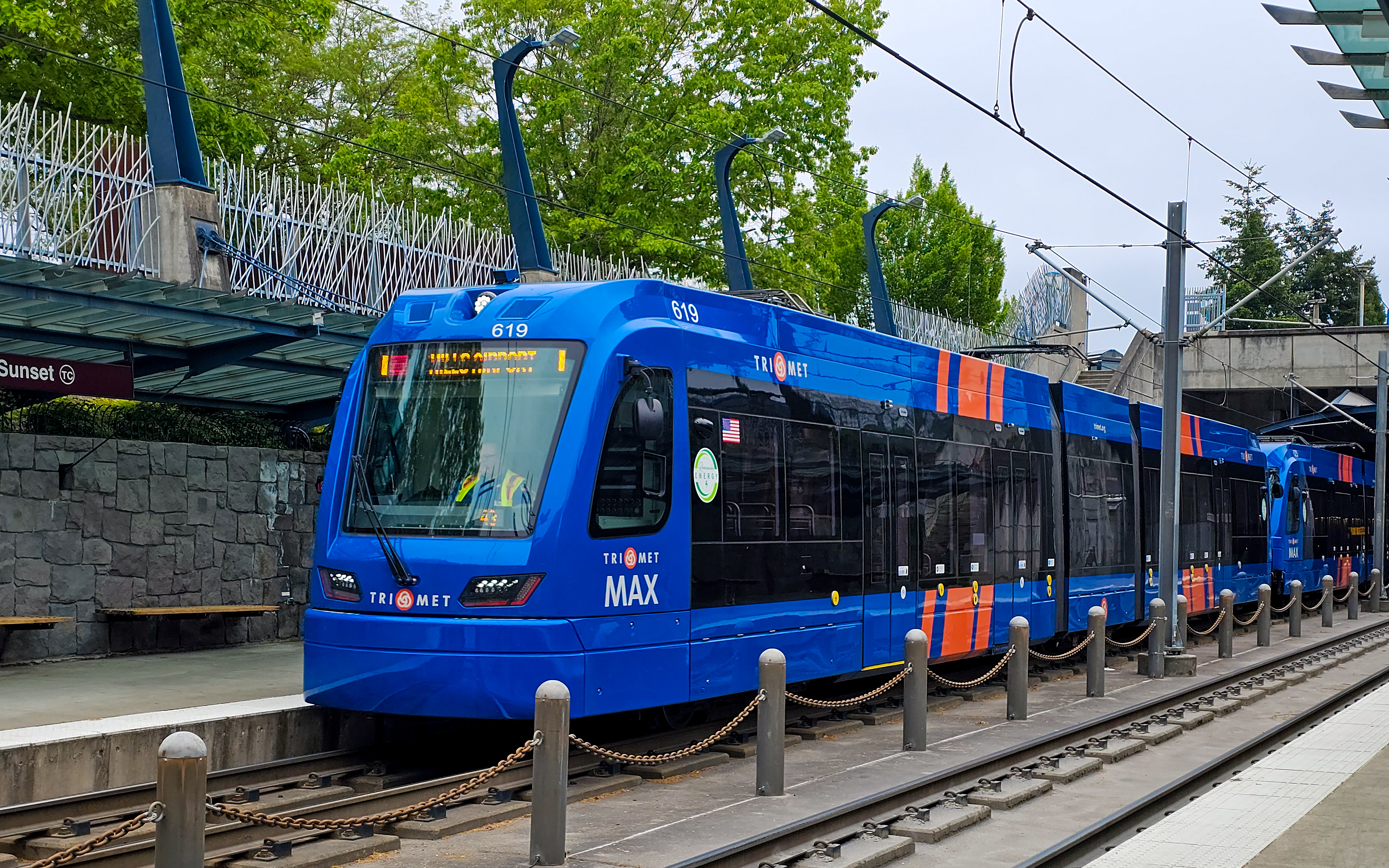
- From top to bottom: A Type 2 Blue Line train on the Steel Bridge and a Type 6 Red Line train at Sunset Transit Center

Overview
- Owner: TriMet
- Locale: Portland, Oregon, U.S.
- Transit type: Light rail
- Number of lines: 5
- Number of stations: 93
- Daily ridership: 66,300 (weekdays, Q2 2026)
- Annual ridership: 22,061,900 (2025)
- Website: trimet.org/max

Operation
- Began operation: September 5, 1986; 40 years ago
- Number of vehicles: 149 (details)
- Train length: 1–2 vehicles

Technical
- System length: 59.7 mi (96.1 km)
- Track gauge: 4 ft 8 1/2 in (1,435 mm) standard gauge
- Electrification: Overhead line, 750 V DC
- Top speed: 55 mph (89 km/h)
System map
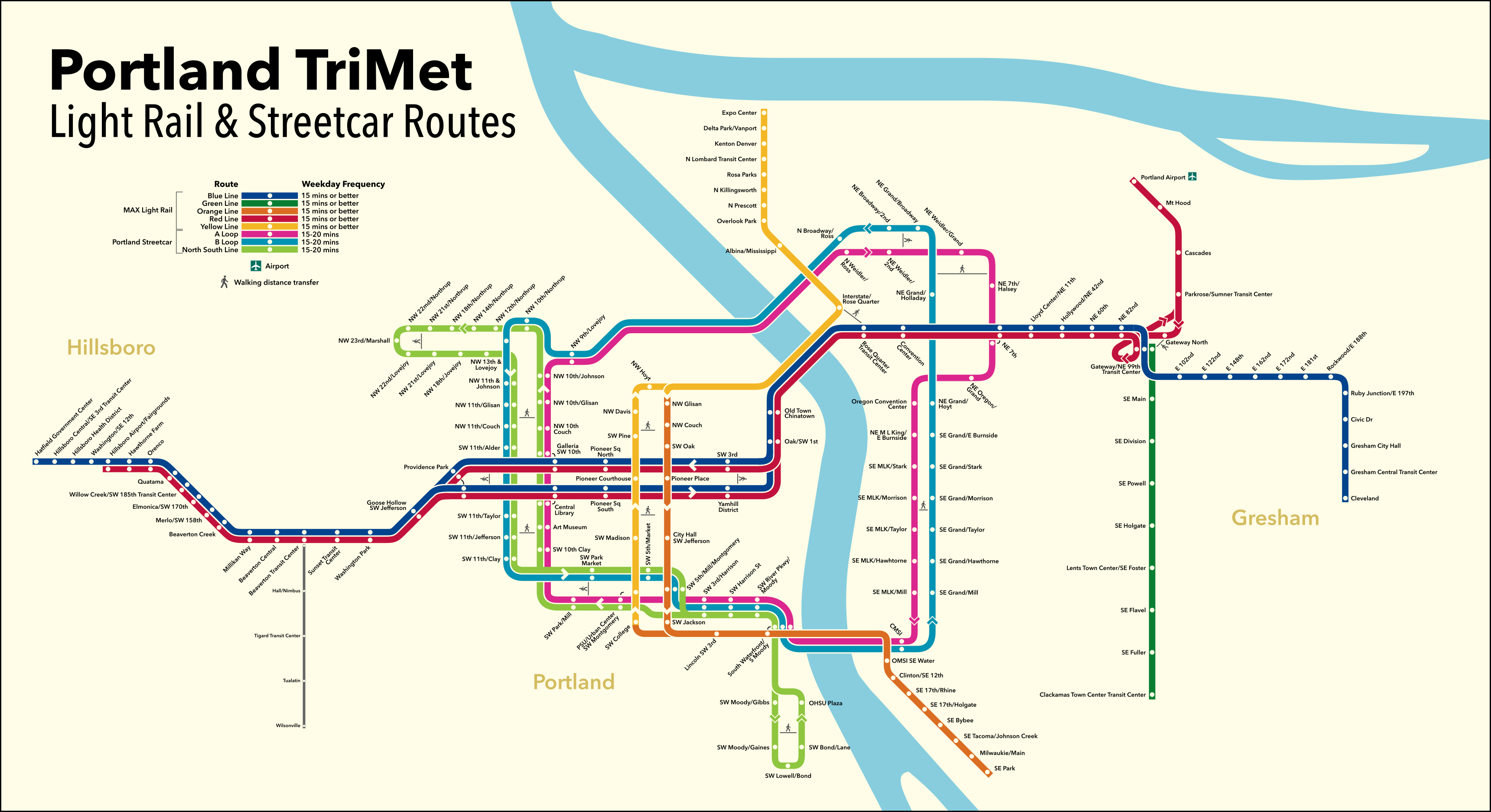
- All stations are accessible
Key

The Metropolitan Area Express (MAX) is a light rail system serving the Portland metropolitan area in the U.S. state of Oregon. Owned and operated by TriMet, it spans 59.7 miles (96.1 km) and comprises five lines and 93 stations. The system connects parts of Clackamas, Multnomah, and Washington counties, with the Blue, Orange, Red, and Yellow lines converging in downtown Portland and the Green Line operating along Interstate 205 (I-205) in East Portland and Clackamas. Trains run at frequencies ranging from 30 minutes off-peak to 7 1/2 minutes in overlapping segments. In 2025, MAX had a ridership of 22.1 million.

MAX was among the first second-generation light rail systems built in the United States, emerging from freeway revolts in the 1970s. Planning for its inaugural eastside segment, then known as the Banfield Light Rail Project, began in 1973 after the cancellation of the Mount Hood Freeway. Construction started in 1982, and service between downtown Portland and Gresham commenced on September 5, 1986. The system has since expanded several times, most recently with the opening of the Portland–Milwaukie extension in 2015.

MAX is one of three urban rail systems in the Portland metropolitan area, alongside the Portland Streetcar and WES Commuter Rail. MAX connects directly with these systems as well as with Amtrak, Frequent Express, and local and intercity buses. Trains operate in consists of up to two cars due to Portland's short downtown blocks. All vehicles and platforms are accessible, and fares are collected using the Hop Fastpass payment system.

== History ==
=== Predecessors ===
In the early 20th century, privately funded interurbans and streetcars gave Portland one of the largest urban rail systems in the American West, with lines that once extended as far north as Vancouver, Washington, south as Eugene, east as Troutdale, and west as Forest Grove. Ben Holladay brought Portland's first trolleys from San Francisco in 1872; drawn by horses and mules, they were operated by the Portland Street Railway Company. In 1890, the first electric streetcar opened in Albina while the first cable car began serving 5th Avenue; these marked the start of an era of major rail expansion. In 1892, the East Side Railway Company opened the first long-distance interurban line—a 16-mile (25.7 km) route from Portland to Oregon City. The Portland Railway, Light and Power Company had taken over all local streetcars by 1906, and interurbans by 1908. In 1912, as Portland's population exceeded 250,000, transit ridership stood at 70 million passengers annually. Passenger rail services had started to decline by the 1920s with the rise of the automobile and suburban and freeway development. Portland's original streetcar lines had ceased operating by 1950, replaced by buses until 2001, when the modern Portland Streetcar opened in downtown Portland. The region's last two interurban lines, which traveled to Oregon City and Bellrose (Southeast 136th Avenue), permanently closed in 1958.

=== Early beginnings ===
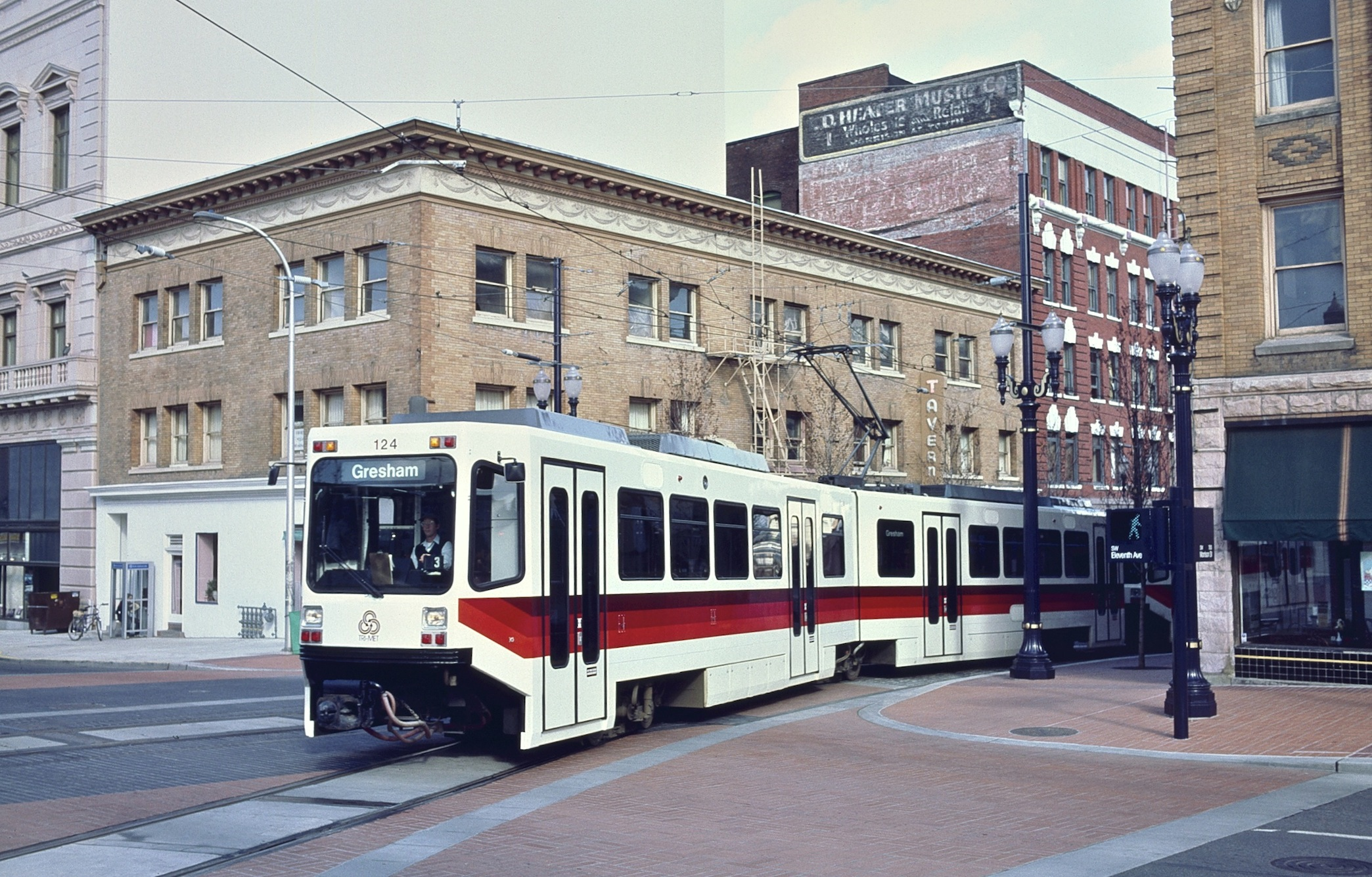
An original Bombardier light rail train entering the 11th Avenue turnaround loop in downtown Portland in 1987

At the height of local freeway revolts in the 1970s, studies for public transit began using funds made available by the Federal-Aid Highway Act of 1973. These funds had been intended for the Mount Hood Freeway and Interstate 505 (I-505) projects, which were abandoned amid strong opposition from the Portland city government and neighborhood associations. In 1973, Governor Tom McCall assembled a task force that helped determine several alternative options, including a busway and light rail. Local jurisdictions originally favored the busway alternative, but support for light rail prevailed following the mode's inclusion in a 1977 environmental impact statement. The proposal became known as the Banfield light rail project, named for the Banfield Freeway, a segment of I-84 that part of the alignment followed. TriMet approved the project in September 1978. Construction of the 15.3-mile (24.6 km), 27-station line between 11th Avenue in downtown Portland and Cleveland Avenue in Gresham began in March 1982. Inaugural service commenced on September 5, 1986. Less than two months before opening, TriMet adopted the name "Metropolitan Area Express", or "MAX", following an employee contest.

As the planning of a light rail line to the west side gained momentum in the mid-1980s, the original MAX line came to be referred to as the Eastside MAX to distinguish it from what would become the Westside MAX extension. Early proposals called for the extension to terminate just west of the Beaverton–Hillsboro boundary on 185th Avenue in Washington County. A dispute between TriMet and the Urban Mass Transportation Administration over a financing plan suspended the project for several years but planning resumed in 1988 and studies were completed in 1991. Staunch lobbying by local and state officials led by Hillsboro Mayor Shirley Huffman forced an extension of the line further west to downtown Hillsboro in 1993. Construction of the 20-station, 18-mile (29 km) line began that August with the excavation of the Robertson Tunnel. The Westside MAX opened in two stages following delays in tunneling: the section from 11th Avenue to Kings Hill/Southwest Salmon Street was opened in 1997 and the section to Hatfield Government Center—the segment's current western terminus—was opened in 1998. The resulting 33-mile (53 km) MAX line began operating as a single, through service on September 12, 1998.

=== South/North plan ===
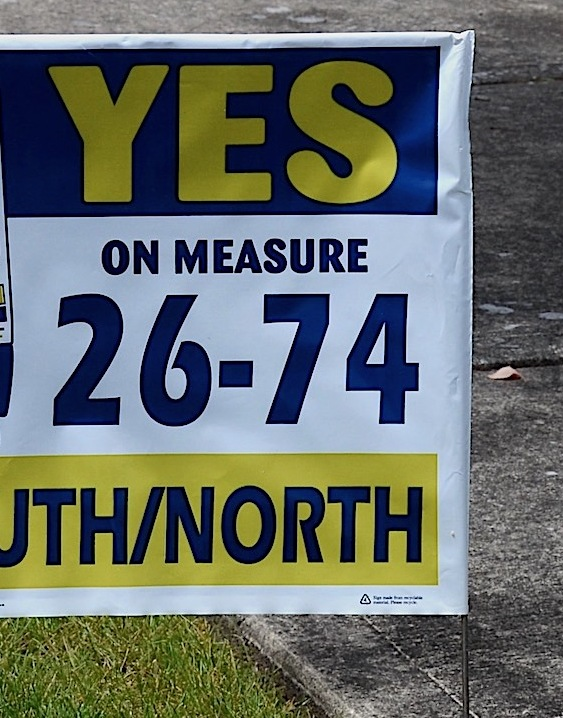
A lawn sign supporting the 1998 South/North ballot measure

At the same time TriMet was planning the Westside MAX in the mid-1980s, Metro regional government announced new light rail proposals for Clackamas County. Its planning committee—the Joint Policy Advisory Committee on Transportation (JPACT)—proposed two separate routes that would have run between downtown Portland and Oregon City via Milwaukie and between Portland International Airport and Clackamas Town Center via I-205. Further planning led JPACT to favor the I-205 corridor due to an existing right-of-way along the I-205 Transitway, an unfinished mass transit component of the freeway that had been built to accommodate a busway. TriMet, however, prioritized the Westside MAX during its bid for federal matching funds and the I-205 plans were put on hold. In 1989, studies for both I-205 and Milwaukie proposals received funding from the U.S. Senate Committee on Appropriations under the condition that they included potential route extensions to Clark County, Washington. Metro completed the studies in 1993, ultimately abandoning I-205 in favor of a route along the I-5 and Willamette River corridors. It finalized a single 25-mile (40 km) line from Hazel Dell, Washington south to Clackamas Town Center via Milwaukie, which Metro and TriMet formally named the South–North Line. Metro said it adopted the name "South/North" instead of the more conventional "North/South" word order, at the request of representatives in the southern part of the corridor after the southern leg, which had long been planned to be the next-priority MAX corridor after the Westside line, was merged with the northern leg as a single proposed project.

In November 1994, 63% of Portland area voters passed a $475 million ballot measure to fund Oregon's portion of the project. The following February, however, Clark County residents defeated a tax measure that would have funded Washington's share. To move the project forward, TriMet downsized the plan and abandoned the line's Clark County and North Portland segments up to the Rose Quarter. That July, the Oregon House of Representatives approved a $750 million transportation package, which included $375 million for the scaled-back line. The funding was annulled by the Oregon Supreme Court due to the inclusion of unrelated measures that violated the state's constitution. The legislature met again in February 1996 and passed a revised $375 million package, but light rail opponents forced a statewide vote and defeated it the following November. A third proposal between Lombard Street in North Portland and Clackamas Town Center followed. This time, Metro and TriMet pursued the project without seeking contributions from either Clark County or the state, instead sourcing funds from Clackamas County and Portland. In 1998, TriMet placed a new ballot measure to reaffirm voter support for the $475 million originally approved in 1994. The measure failed by 52% in November of that year, effectively canceling the proposed line.

=== Airport and Interstate lines ===
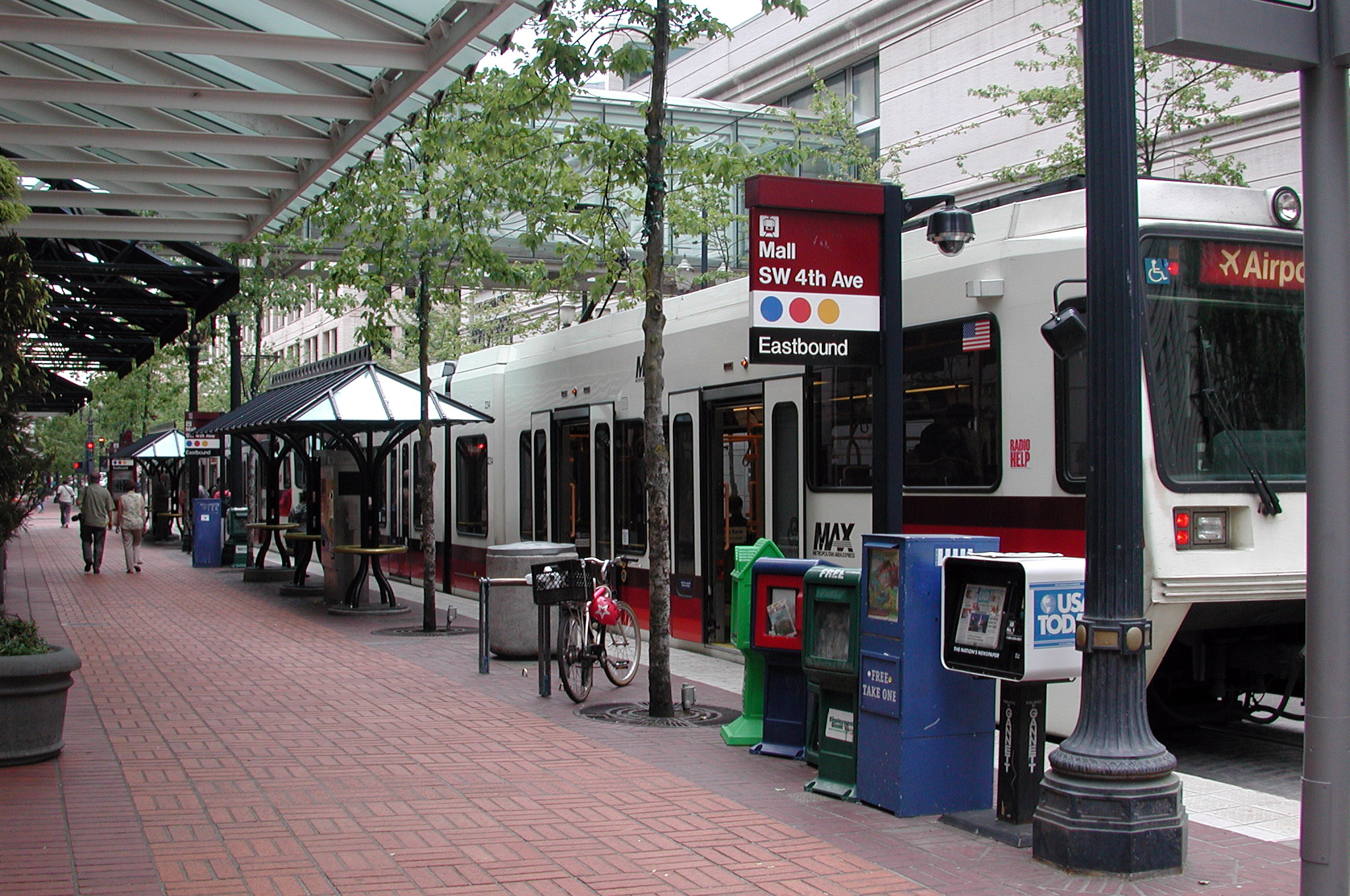
A train stopped at the now-closed Mall/SW 4th Ave station in 2009, when it was served by the Blue, Red, and Yellow lines

Driven by the rapid expansion of Portland International Airport in the 1990s, the Port of Portland explored ways to ease growing traffic congestion, including introducing MAX service decades earlier than regional planners had anticipated. In 1997, engineering firm Bechtel accelerated the effort with an unsolicited proposal to design and build the airport rail link in exchange for 120 acres (49 ha) of Port property. A public–private partnership was formed, and construction of the Airport MAX began in June 1999. With right-of-way already secured and no federal funding requested, the project was completed in four years, and the four-station, 5.5-mile (8.9 km) branch line between Gateway Transit Center and the airport opened on September 10, 2001. Celebrations planned for that weekend were cancelled in the aftermath of the September 11 attacks. To service the new route, TriMet enacted a color-coded route naming scheme: Blue Line for trains running between Hillsboro and Gresham and Red Line for trains running between the airport and downtown Portland. On September 1, 2003, the Red Line was extended west to Beaverton Transit Center to relieve Blue Line overcrowding and provide a one-seat airport connection for the west side.

In 1999, Portland business leaders and residents opposed to the cancellation of the South/North project urged TriMet to revive it. TriMet responded with a scaled-back proposal extending MAX only to North Portland via North Interstate Avenue. Construction on the Interstate MAX began in February 2001. To reduce taxpayer costs, the city created an urban renewal district, while federal matching funds from the locally funded Airport MAX and Central City Streetcar projects were redirected to the line. The 10-station, 5.8-mile (9.3 km) extension from Rose Quarter Transit Center to the Portland Expo Center opened on May 1, 2004, as part of the Yellow Line. From 2004 to 2009, the Yellow Line ran from Expo Center station to 11th Avenue in downtown Portland, sharing tracks with the Blue and Red lines across the Steel Bridge. On August 30, 2009, it was rerouted to the PSU Urban Center stations following the addition of light rail to the Portland Transit Mall. In September 2012, service was extended farther south to the PSU South stations, which had been delayed by nearby transit-oriented development. Since 2015, the Yellow Line has interlined with the Orange Line and now operates only the northbound segment of the transit mall.

=== South Corridor extensions ===
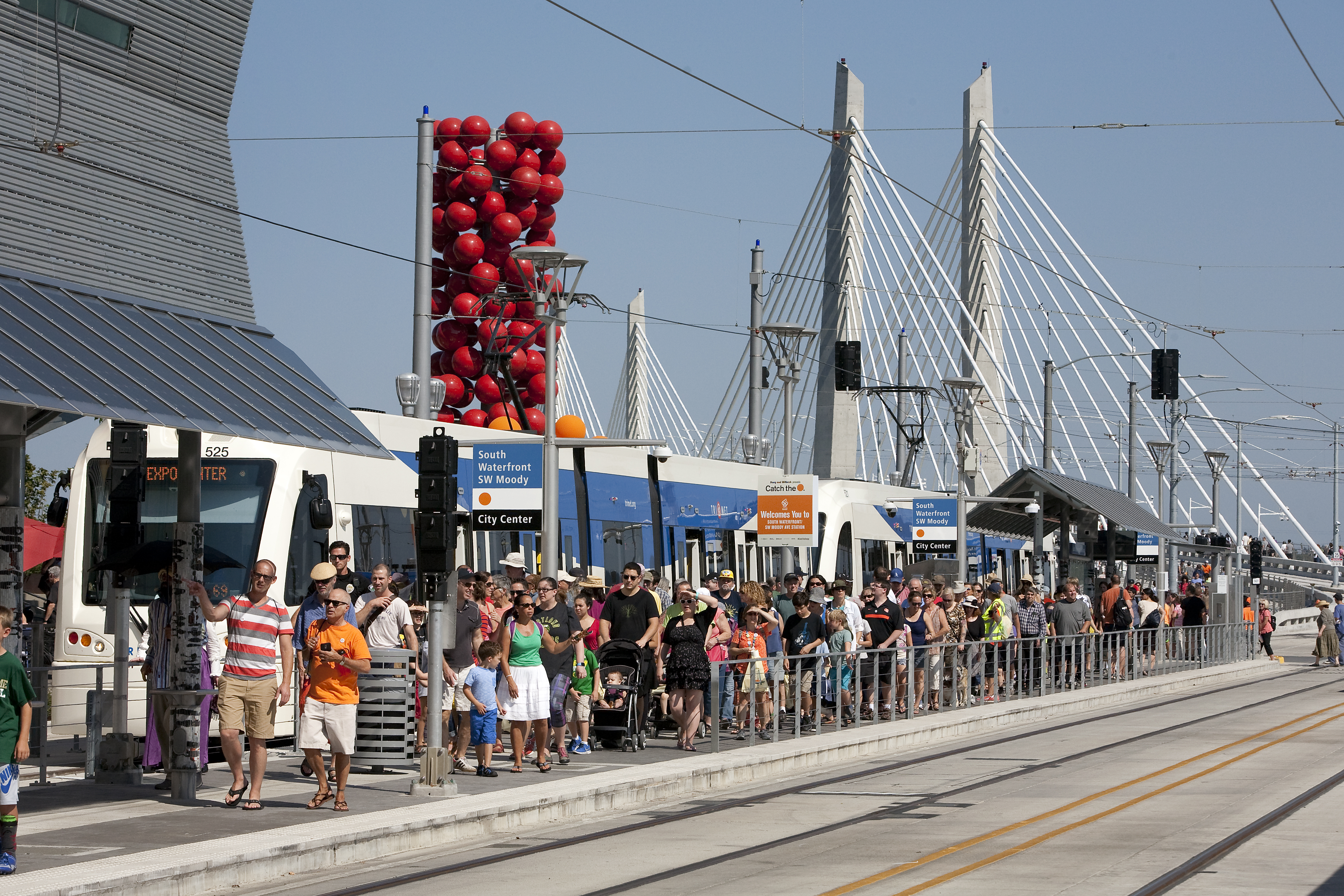
Crowds at South Waterfront/S Moody station, with Tilikum Crossing in the background, during the Orange Line's opening in 2015

In 2001, Metro revisited its former light rail plans for Clackamas County and reconsidered proposals similar to those of the canceled south–north project, with two routes extending to Clackamas and Milwaukie. This resulted in a new study, which Metro referred to as the South Corridor transportation project, that evaluated light rail among other alternatives. The study's task force recommend both light rail options in 2003 and suggested splitting the project into two phases. The first phase planned for the addition of light rail to I-205, between Gateway Transit Center and Clackamas Town Center. In October of that year, the first phase plans were amended to include adding light rail to the Portland Transit Mall following a petition from Portland business leaders. The combined project was approved for federal funding in 2006 and work began in January 2007. Light rail commenced service along the 14-station, 1.8-mile (2.9 km) Portland Transit Mall on August 30, 2009, first served by the Yellow Line. The opening of the eight-station, 6.5-mile (10.5 km) I-205 MAX and Green Line service followed on September 12.

The South Corridor project's second phase initially proposed the extension of MAX between downtown Portland and Milwaukie via the Hawthorne Bridge. Studies showed that this alignment would cause severe traffic bottlenecks in downtown. As a result, Portland businesses pushed for the construction of a new bridge further upstream that led to the southern end of the Portland Transit Mall. The locally preferred alignment was finalized in mid-2008; a new bridge would carry light rail across the Willamette River from the South Waterfront to just south of the Oregon Museum of Science and Industry (OMSI). TriMet designed this bridge, which was eventually inaugurated as Tilikum Crossing, to be "car-free" and to accommodate only transit vehicles, bicycles, and pedestrians. Construction of the line began in June 2011. In September 2012, opponents passed a ballot initiative—with 60% of the vote—requiring all Clackamas County spending on light rail to be approved by voters. Following the county's attempt to end its involvement and a suit filed by TriMet, a circuit court upheld the project's continuation. The 17-station, 7.3-mile (11.7 km) Portland–Milwaukie segment and Orange Line service opened on September 12, 2015. The Orange Line, operating along the Portland Transit Mall's southbound segment, became the third service to serve this corridor.

=== Red Line track improvements and extension to Hillsboro ===
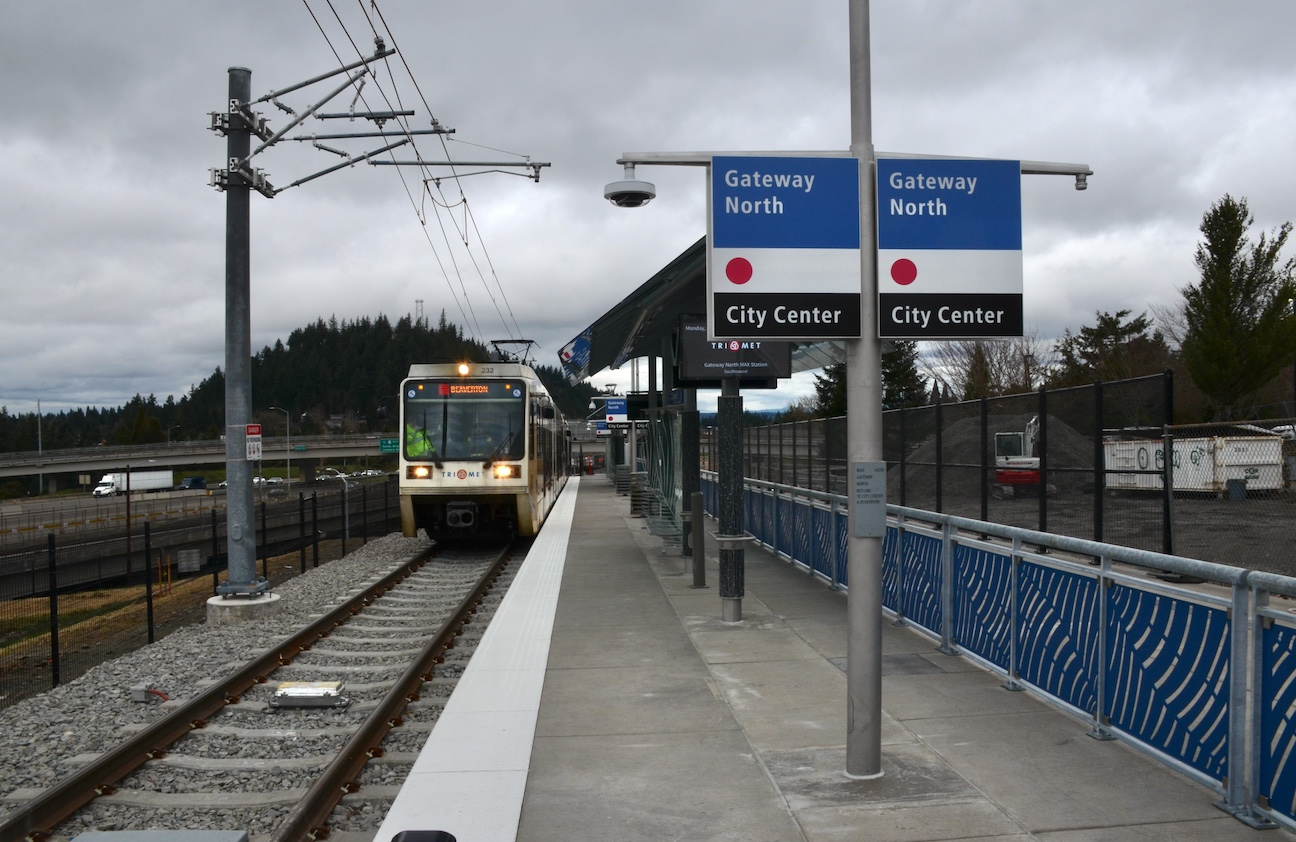
The Gateway North station on the day of opening, in 2024

In October 2017, TriMet, citing system-wide delays caused by two single-track segments along the Airport MAX, announced the MAX Red Line Improvements Project, later renamed "A Better Red". A Better Red sought double-tracking a 2,800-foot-long (850 m) section of track north of Gateway Transit Center and another 3,800-foot-long (1,200 m) section alongside Northeast Airport Way just before the airport terminal. To qualify the project for federal funding, TriMet included extending Red Line service farther west to Fair Complex/Hillsboro Airport station in Hillsboro; this extension would use existing Westside MAX tracks and create a one-seat option from 10 additional stations to Portland International Airport. Additionally, TriMet had announced it would procure up to eight new light rail vehicles to accommodate the improvements, but later purchased 30 new trains overall; four were part of A Better Red, while the remaining 26 were replacements for the original MAX fleet, which are gradually being retired.

Preliminary design work began in February 2018. TriMet adopted a locally preferred alternative in April 2019, and the FTA announced $99.99 million for the project through the Capital Investment Grants program in May 2020. Final design was completed by engineering firm Parametrix in early 2021. The design includes two new bridges north of Gateway Transit Center to accommodate the second track and a new MAX platform called "Gateway North". TriMet broke ground on September 28, 2021.

From April 2–9, 2022, Red Line service was suspended to make way for construction, and shuttle buses operated between Gateway Transit Center and Portland International Airport. The project was completed in March 2024.

From June 18 to October 21, 2023, TriMet suspended MAX service between Gateway Transit Center and the airport to allow for construction of the second track between the airport and Mount Hood Avenue.

From January 14 to March 3, 2024, TriMet suspended MAX Red, Blue and Green Line service between NE 7th and Gateway Transit Center. Inbound Red Line trains from PDX began serving Gateway North on March 4, 2024. These projects eliminated the last bidirectional single-track sections on the MAX system.

The Red Line extension to Hillsboro began service on August 25, 2024, with a soft launch, with the full launch beginning on August 28. Fair Complex/Hillsboro Airport station was also renamed to Hillsboro Airport/Fairgrounds station.

== Future expansion and improvements ==
MAX expansion projects are generally advised by the federally mandated regional transportation plan (RTP), which is updated every five years and guides the investment strategy for the region's transportation needs over the subsequent two decades. When the RTP is updated, TriMet engages with local, regional, state, and federal governments and agencies, community organizations, business groups, and members of the public to identify and recommend projects. Metro, the metropolitan planning organization for the Oregon side of the Portland metropolitan area, publishes the RTP, and the 2023 RTP is its latest iteration.

The 2023 RTP includes an update to Metro's high-capacity transit (HCT) strategy, which identifies regional corridors to prioritize for transit upgrades and transit modes to invest in. The 2023 HCT strategy lists 29 regional priority investment corridors, ranked into four tiers based on a readiness criteria. Tier 1 near-term corridors are defined as "corridors most viable to advance into implementation in the next four years" and include those with adopted locally preferred alternatives. Tier 2 next-phase corridors are corridors that may be pursued "if recommended land use planning and policy actions are implemented" and are candidates for HCT implementation within the next five years. Tier 3 and 4 corridors are corridors that ranked low on the readiness criteria and have a longer-term path towards implementation.

List of MAX expansion projects with adopted locally preferred alternatives
Project	Status	Termini		Length	New stations	Expected opening
Yellow Line extension to Vancouver (Interstate Bridge Replacement)	Design	Expo Center	Evergreen Boulevard	1.9 miles (3.1 km)	3	To be determined
Southwest Corridor	Suspended	PSU South	Bridgeport Village	11 miles (18 km)	13	To be determined

=== Yellow Line extension to Vancouver ===
The Interstate Bridge Replacement (IBR) Program includes a northward extension of the Yellow Line to serve Vancouver, Washington. The project would add 1.9 miles (3.1 km) of track and three new stations at Hayden Island, the Vancouver Waterfront, and Evergreen Boulevard. An earlier proposal for the extension was a part of the Columbia River Crossing project in the early 2010s. That project would have extended light rail 2.9 miles (4.7 km) to Clark College and added seven stations. The CRC project was cancelled in July 2013 after the Washington State Senate failed to approve $450 million in funding, with the inclusion of light rail cited as a common objection from opponents.

=== Southwest Corridor ===
The Southwest Corridor Light Rail Project is a planned extension of MAX from PSU in downtown Portland to Bridgeport Village in Tualatin via Southwest Portland and Tigard. It would add 11 miles (18 km) of track and 13 new stations. Initially scheduled to open in 2027, the project was indefinitely suspended on November 3, 2020, after voters rejected a tax ballot measure that would have funded the local-area share.

=== Central City Tunnel ===
Constructs a tunnel beneath downtown Portland from Goose Hollow to the Lloyd Center. In 2025, Metro completed a Regional Rail Futures Study where it concluded that the proposed tunnel or a replacement of the Steel Bridge should be the highest priority for cross-regional transit mobility.

=== Other proposals ===
Metro's Regional Rail Futures Study identifies two additional corridors presenting "immediate" opportunities for light rail.

- Forest Grove–Hillsboro
- Milwaukie–Oregon City (McLoughlin Boulevard)
- Supplemental "Teal Line" service from the Airport to Clackamas, avoiding the congested Banfield Line.

== Lines and segments ==
For MAX, a "line" refers to the physical railroad tracks and stations a train serves within its designated termini—in other words, a train route or service. MAX comprises five lines, each identified by a color. Color designations were adopted for separately operated routes in 2000 and implemented on September 10, 2001, with the opening of the Airport MAX extension. On that date, service between Hillsboro and Gresham was designated the Blue Line, while service between downtown Portland and Portland International Airport became the Red Line.

Every MAX line interlines with at least one other service, particularly near the system's central area. The Steel Bridge carries the greatest number of interlining routes, with three lines—Blue, Red, and Yellow (and Green until 2026)—sharing the same tracks. TriMet has modified routes over time, often in conjunction with system expansions. For example, the Yellow Line, which began service in 2004, originally followed the same downtown Portland alignment as the Blue and Red lines. In 2009, it was realigned to the Portland Transit Mall when light rail service was introduced to that corridor.

List of MAX lines
Service	Stations	Termini	
Blue Line	47	Hatfield Government Center (Hillsboro)	Cleveland Ave (Gresham)
Red Line	36	Hillsboro Airport/Fairgrounds	Portland Airport
Green Line	9	Gateway Transit Center	Clackamas Town Center Transit Center
Yellow Line	17	Expo Center	PSU South
Orange Line	17	Union Station	SE Park Ave (Milwaukie)

=== Segments ===
The 59.7-mile (96.1 km) MAX rail system was built in a series of six projects that began with the 15.1-mile (24.3 km) Banfield—now called Eastside—segment between downtown Portland and Gresham. Each successive project has been an extension or branch of an existing segment, and TriMet has historically paired each project with the opening of a new line, often making the line and segment synonymous (e.g. "Airport MAX Red Line").

A geographic map of the MAX Light Rail network.

List of MAX segments
Project	Opened	Endpoints	Length (new)
Banfield (Eastside)	September 5, 1986	11th Ave loop–Cleveland Ave	15.1 miles (24.3 km)
Westside	September 12, 1998	Hatfield Government Center–11th Ave loop	17.7 miles (28.5 km)
Airport	September 10, 2001	Portland Airport–Gateway	5.5 miles (8.9 km)
Interstate	May 1, 2004	Expo Center–Rose Quarter	5.8 miles (9.3 km)
Portland Mall	August 30, 2009	Steel Bridge–PSU South	1.8 miles (2.9 km)
I-205	September 12, 2009	Gateway–Clackamas Town Center	6.5 miles (10.5 km)
Portland–Milwaukie	September 12, 2015	PSU South–SE Park Ave	7.3 miles (11.7 km)
Total			59.7 miles (96.1 km)

=== Right-of-way ===
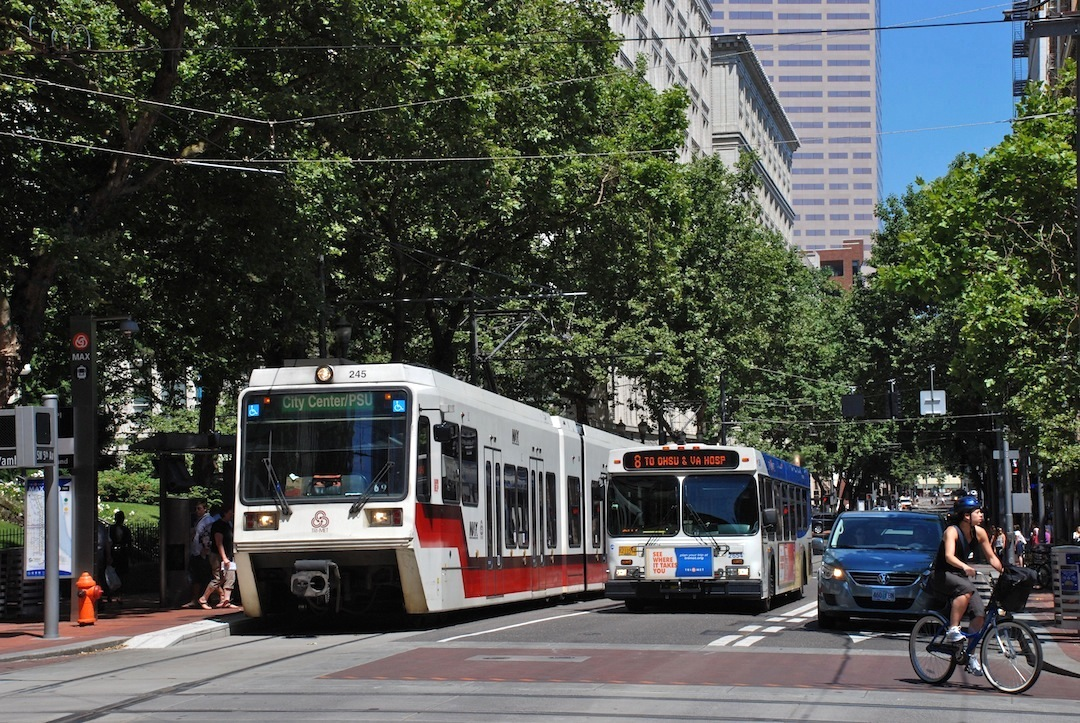
MAX traveling alongside a TriMet bus and a private vehicle on the Portland Transit Mall

MAX operates on a mixture of shared and exclusive transit rights-of-way. Within downtown Portland, trains run on surface streets in dedicated lanes restricted to private vehicles, and operators follow the city's traffic control system. On the Morrison–Yamhill couplet, MAX travels in the left lanes. On the Portland Transit Mall (the 5th and 6th avenue couplet), MAX shares dedicated lanes with buses, and both travel in the center or right lanes and stop at their respective curbside platforms on the right. Lanes may be separated by turtleback delineators or double solid white lines and are marked with white diamonds or white “T” symbols.

Outside downtown Portland, MAX runs along street medians and viaducts, alongside freeways and freight rail lines, and underground. Where tracks run within a street median, intersections are controlled by traffic signals that grant trains preemption. Where tracks occupy a separate right-of-way, trains are protected by automated grade crossing gates at level crossings. Some segments are elevated to carry trains over busy thoroughfares and difficult terrain. A three-mile (4.8 km) section runs beneath Washington Park in Portland's West Hills through the Robertson Tunnel, the system's longest underground segment.

MAX crosses the Willamette River via the Steel Bridge and Tilikum Crossing. In studies for the Banfield Light Rail Project, planners recommended using the Steel Bridge because of its earlier role as a river crossing for the city's historic streetcars. When MAX entered service in 1986, trains shared the bridge's center lanes with vehicular traffic. In 2008, the bridge's upper deck was closed to construct a junction between the Eastside MAX tracks and the newer Portland Transit Mall tracks. After reopening, the two inner lanes were reserved exclusively for MAX trains, while cars, buses, and other motorized traffic were restricted to the outer lanes. The newer Tilikum Crossing prohibits private vehicles and allows transit vehicles (MAX, streetcar, and buses), cyclists, pedestrians, and emergency responders only. As a result, Tilikum Crossing is widely recognized as the first major “car-free” bridge in the United States.

== Infrastructure ==
=== Rolling stock ===
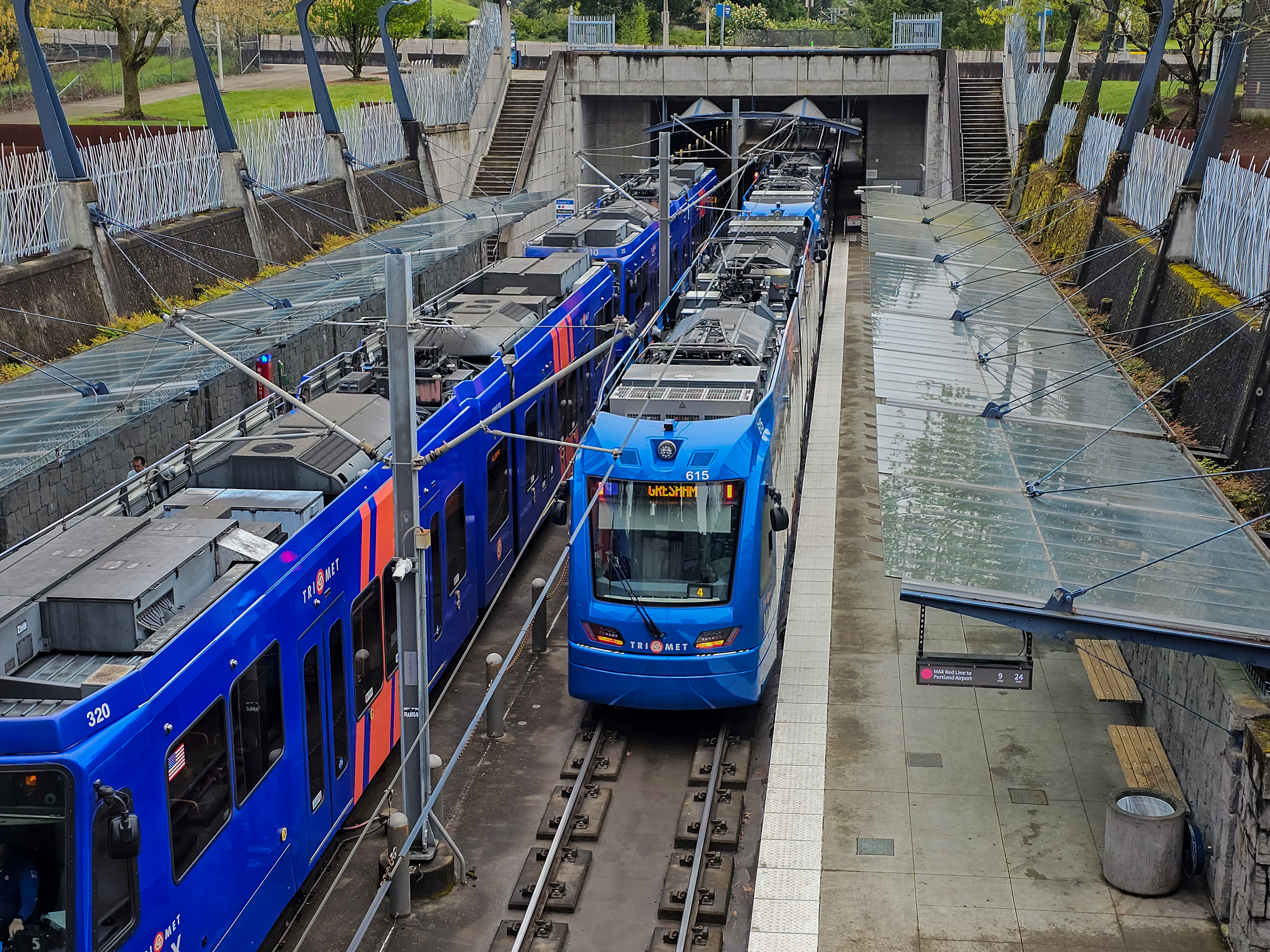
A two-car Type 3 train (left) and a two-car Type 6 train (right) stopped at Sunset Transit Center in 2026

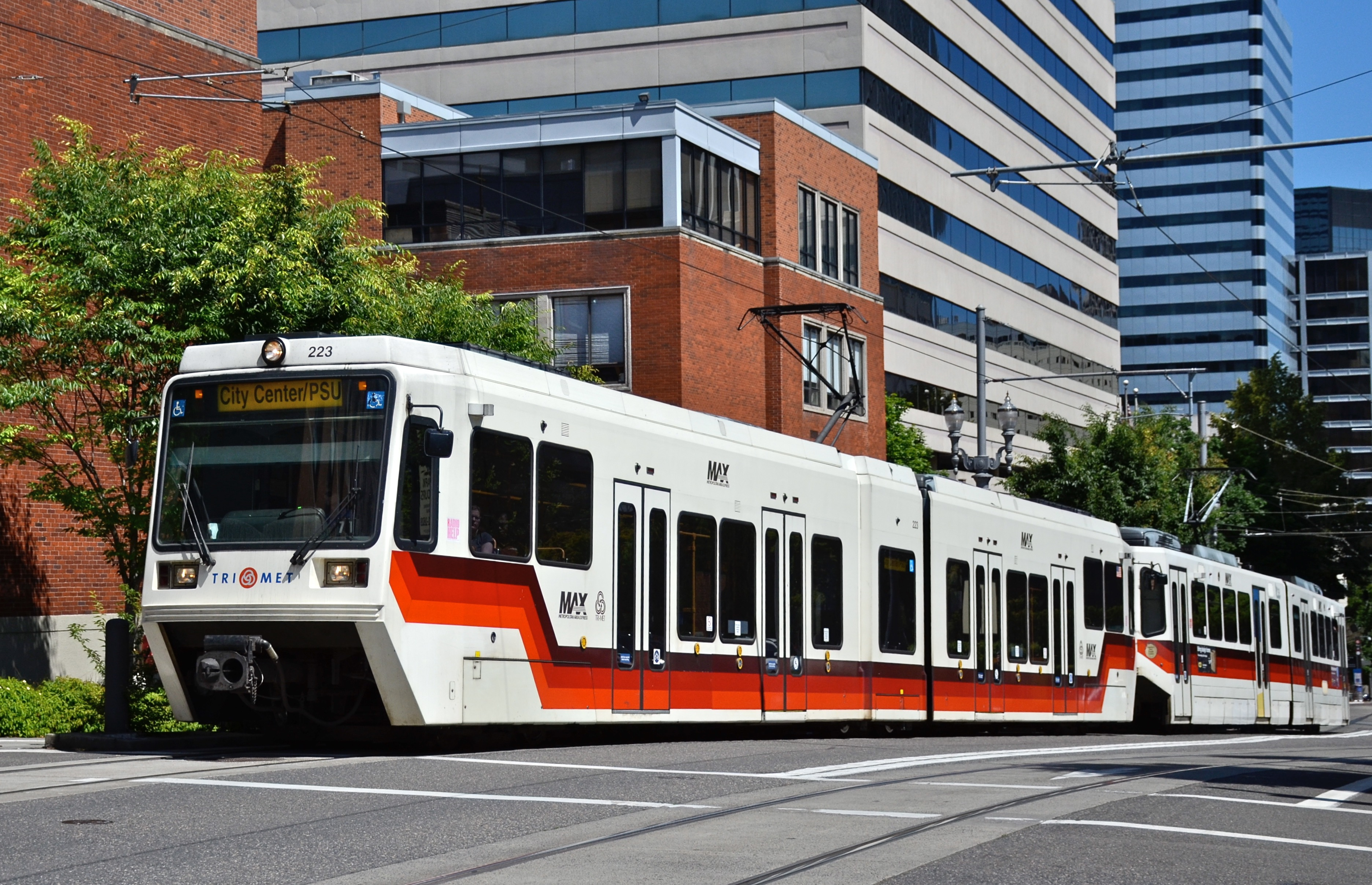
A train composed of one Type 2 low-floor car and one (now-retired) Type 1 high-floor car on the Portland Transit Mall in 2015

As of May 2026, MAX uses a total of 149 low-floor light rail vehicles, all manufactured by Siemens Mobility. The current MAX fleet comprises five active models, designated as "Type 2" through "Type 6", three of which are successive upgrades of the same base model. The Type 1 model is retired. Each car is equipped for bi-directional operation, except for the Type 4 and Type 5 models, which feature a single operator cab. Downtown Portland's 200-foot (61 m) blocks permit the operation of only one- or two-car consists. Type 2 and Type 3 low-floor cars may operate either individually or coupled with another Type 2 or Type 3 car. Type 4 and 5 cars can only be coupled to one another, and Type 6 cars can run as single cars or coupled with other Type 6 cars.

the number on a MAX train can show you what type it is, for example the number 201 would mean the vehicle is a Type 2 (2)01 and the numbers after that show which one it is 2(01) meaning that vehicle would be the first ever MAX type 2.

Twenty-six Type 1 cars were manufactured by a joint venture between Bombardier and La Brugeoise et Nivelles beginning in 1983. TriMet announced it would purchase seven additional vehicles that August, but a budget shortfall forced the agency to withdraw this proposal the following November. Bombardier built the frames in Quebec while its factory in Barre, Vermont manufactured the majority of each car, the first of which arrived in Portland in 1984. Each 45-short-ton (41 t) car is single-articulated and contains six axles. The high floors connect with the low platforms through interior steps, which necessitated platform wheelchair lifts until the arrival of low-floor cars. A car sits 76 people and has an overall capacity of 166. The Type 1 was officially retired in April 2026, with a special farewell event taking place on April 18.

In 1992, TriMet officials conducted an accessibility study and determined that low-floor cars were the most cost-effective alternative to providing universal access. The following year, TriMet procured 39 Siemens SD660, and MAX became the first light rail system in North America to acquire low-floor train sets. These Type 2 cars were equipped with doorway wheelchair ramps. They entered service during the partial opening of the Westside MAX in 1997. By 2000, TriMet had ordered 17 more Type 2 cars including six for the Airport MAX project. The system's 27 Type 3 vehicles, which the agency purchased as part of the Interstate MAX project and first brought into use in 2003, are the same model as the Type 2 vehicles but with technical upgrades and a new livery.

Twenty-two Siemens S70 low-floor cars, which were designated Type 4, were purchased in conjunction with the I-205 MAX and Portland Transit Mall projects, and were first used in 2009. Type 4 cars have a more streamlined design and more seating, and are lighter and more energy-efficient than the previous models. The Type 4 cars were the first in the MAX network to use LED-type destination signs. The second series of S70 cars, TriMet's Type 5 vehicles, were procured for the Portland–Milwaukie light rail project. TriMet placed an order for the Type 5 cars with Siemens in 2012 and delivery commenced in 2014. These vehicles include some improvements over the Type 4 cars, including less-cramped interior seating, and improvements to the air-conditioning system and wheelchair ramps. These introduced a new seating layout in the center section, among other changes, and Siemens later retroactively redesignated TriMet's Type 5 cars as model S700.

In July 2019, TriMet placed an order for 26 Siemens S700 light rail vehicles to replace the system's 26 Type 1 vehicles. The order was expanded to 30 cars in June 2021. The first car was delivered in December 2022, and the type is designated Type 6. In January 2025, Type 6 vehicles began entering service, with vehicles 603 and 605 being the first two cars to enter revenue service.

=== Power and signaling ===
MAX is powered by a conventional 750-volt direct current (DC) overhead wire system. Most of the network uses a dual-wire catenary, where a contact wire is supported by a messenger wire, while segments in urban areas such as downtown Portland use a single contact wire to reduce the amount of overhead wiring. To further minimize visual impact, ornamental streetlight poles, buildings, and bridge structures support the wiring. Substations, spaced about one mile (1.6 km) apart, convert the high-voltage public supply to the voltage used by trains. The power system is designed to bridge any single substation, allowing trains to continue operating if a substation or its supply fails.

Approximately 70 percent of the MAX system uses automatic block signaling (ABS), which supports relatively high operating speeds—up to 55 miles per hour (89 km/h)—and short headways. For example, along the Banfield Freeway between Lloyd Center/NE 11th Ave station and Gateway Transit Center, ABS can accommodate operating headways as short as two minutes. In these sections, automatic train stops (ATS) enforce speed limits and apply the brakes if an operator fails to do so. The remaining 30 percent of the system relies on traffic signals and line-of-sight operation, where speeds are limited to 35 mph (56 km/h).

=== Operations and maintenance facilities ===
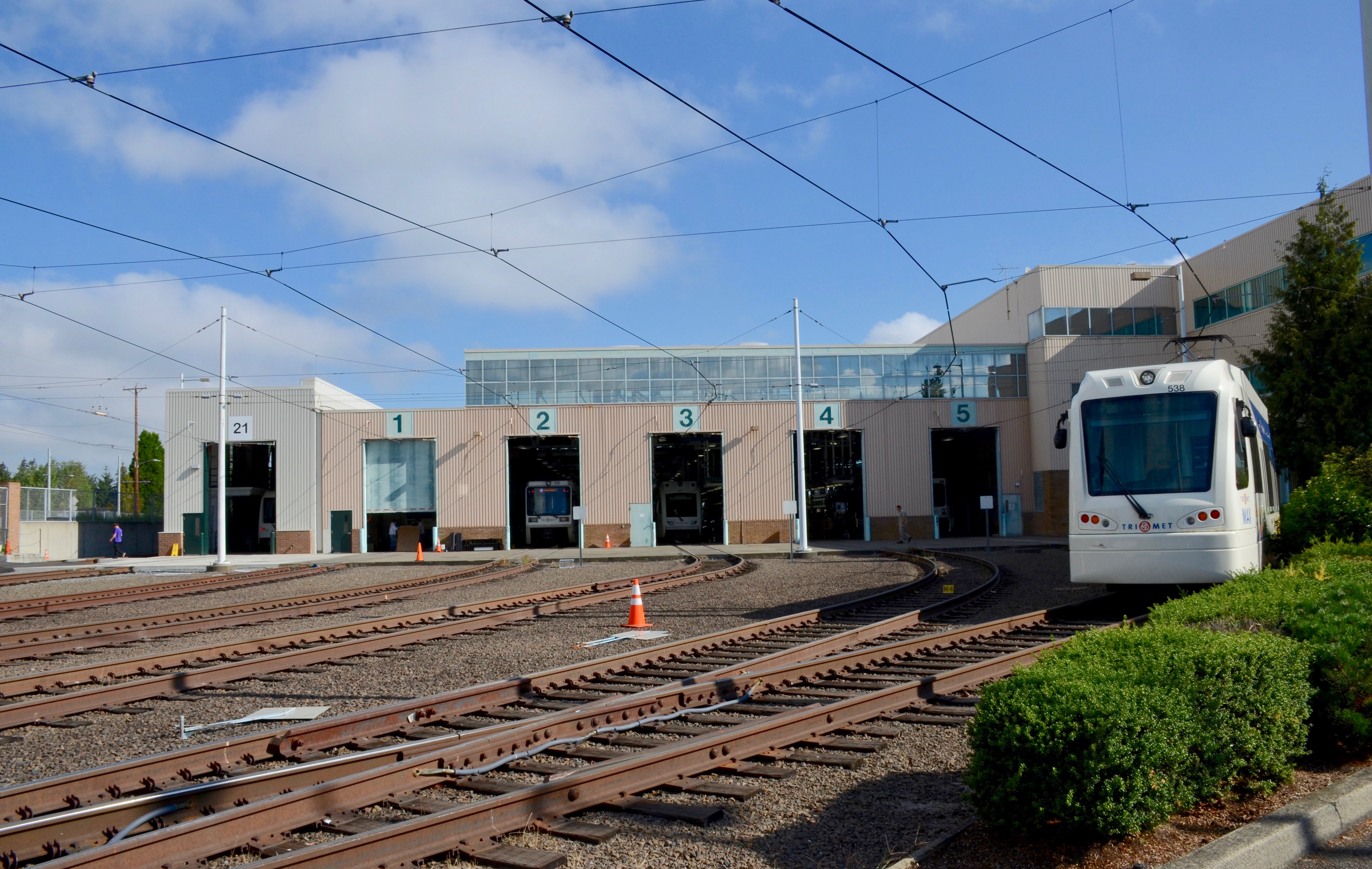
The main building at the Ruby Junction maintenance facility

TriMet's vehicle-maintenance complexes for the MAX system are the Ruby Junction facility in Gresham and the smaller Elmonica facility in Beaverton. The Ruby Junction facility is located near Ruby Junction/E 197th Ave station while the Elmonica facility is adjacent to Elmonica/SW 170th Ave station; both are on the Blue Line.

Ruby Junction began with one building that TriMet built as part of the Banfield Light Rail Project in 1982. It had expanded to three multi-story buildings totaling 143,000 square feet (13,300 m^{2}) occupying 17 acres (6.9 ha) by 2010, and to four buildings totalling 149,000 square feet (13,800 m^{2}) occupying 23 acres (9.3 ha) by 2016. It contains 13 maintenance bays and its yard tracks have the capacity to store 87 light rail cars. In 2016, around 200 employees worked at Ruby Junction and almost 200 MAX operators operated trains that were based there. In addition to vehicle maintenance, crews who maintain the MAX system's tracks and signals are also based at Ruby Junction. In 2015, some maintenance-of-way personnel moved into the Portland Vintage Trolley carbarn next to Rose Quarter Transit Center after Vintage Trolley service was discontinued. Ruby Junction originally housed light-rail operations, communications, and administrative workers.

The Elmonica facility was built as part of the Westside MAX extension in the mid-1990s and was completed in 1996. It was built as a satellite facility to reduce dead mileage and improve system reliability in the event of a service disruption on the Eastside MAX. Its building has 78,000 square feet (7,200 m^{2}) of space.

== Stations ==
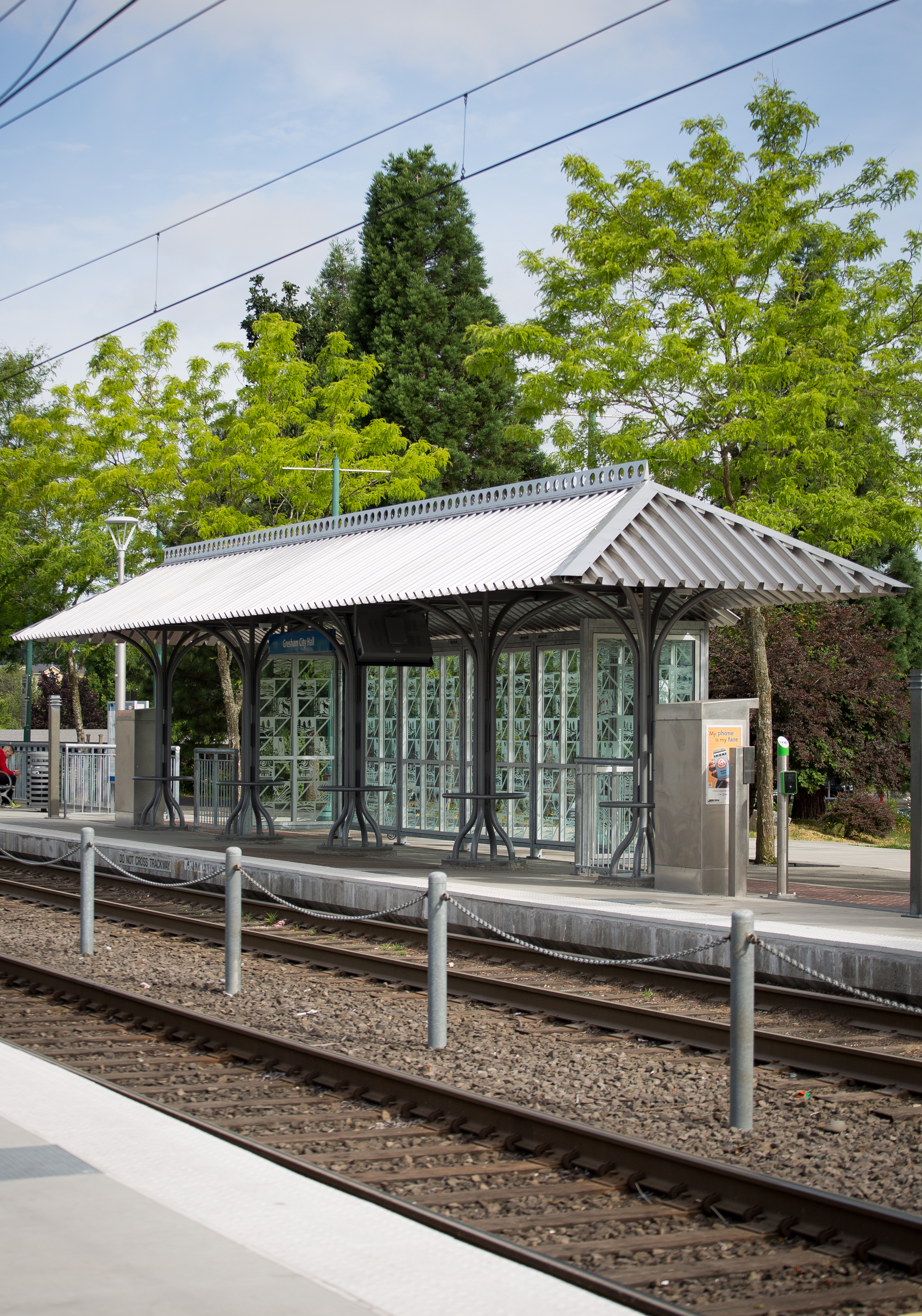
A shelter at Gresham City Hall station, renovated in 2017

The MAX system comprises 93 stations. Of these, 47 are served by the Blue Line, 9 by the Green Line, 36 by the Red Line, 17 by the Orange Line, and 17 by the Yellow Line. Many stations are served by multiple lines: 31, between Hillsboro Airport/Fairgrounds and Gateway Transit Center, are shared by the Blue and Red lines. The system's central stations, where riders can board any MAX service, are located at the Pioneer Courthouse and Pioneer Courthouse Square in downtown Portland. These are the Pioneer Courthouse/SW 6th and Pioneer Place/SW 5th stations, served by the Orange, and Yellow lines, and the Pioneer Square stations, served by the Blue and Red lines.

MAX stations vary in size but are generally simple and austere. Platforms are about 200 feet (61 m) long, a result of Portland's short downtown city blocks, which restrict trains to two-car consists. Like other North American light rail systems, MAX stations do not have faregates; paid fare zones are delineated but remain accessible to anyone. In 2015, TriMet proposed installing turnstiles at stations along the Portland–Milwaukie segment but has not yet done so. Stations are typically equipped with trash cans, shelters, and ticket vending machines. Most stations have arrival information displays that show when trains will arrive and provide other service information, and concession stands operate at some locations.

A majority of MAX stations are at street level, correlating to the system's predominant alignment. Sunset Transit Center, Southeast Bybee Boulevard, and stations along the Banfield Freeway are below street level. One station, Lents Town Center/Southeast Foster Road, is elevated. Washington Park is the system's only underground station and holds the distinction as North America's deepest transit station at 260 feet (79 m) below ground.

MAX stations are often served by or connected with other modes of public transit. Eleven stations are designated as transit centers with connections to multiple local and intercity bus routes. Beaverton Transit Center is the only MAX-served transit center with a transfer to the region's commuter rail line, WES Commuter Rail, which operates between Beaverton and Wilsonville in Washington County. Within the Portland Transit Mall, trains connect with buses serving downtown Portland; bus stops take up transit mall blocks unoccupied by light rail platforms. MAX riders can transfer to the Portland Streetcar at points where MAX and streetcar lines intersect and to Amtrak via two stations near Portland Union Station. The Red Line operates as an airport rail link with a stop at a MAX station attached to the main passenger terminal of Portland International Airport.

TriMet has built a total of six infill stations. Four were built on the original Eastside MAX alignment—Mall/Southwest 4th Avenue (1990), Mall/Southwest 5th Avenue (1990), Convention Center (1990), and Civic Drive (2010)—while two were built on the Portland Transit Mall—PSU South/Southwest 6th and College (2012) and PSU South/Southwest 5th and Jackson (2012). On March 1, 2020, TriMet permanently closed the Mall infill stations in an effort to speed up travel times in downtown Portland. The agency also closed Kings Hill/Southwest Salmon Street station (originally for a trial period, but is now permanent).

Examples of MAX stations
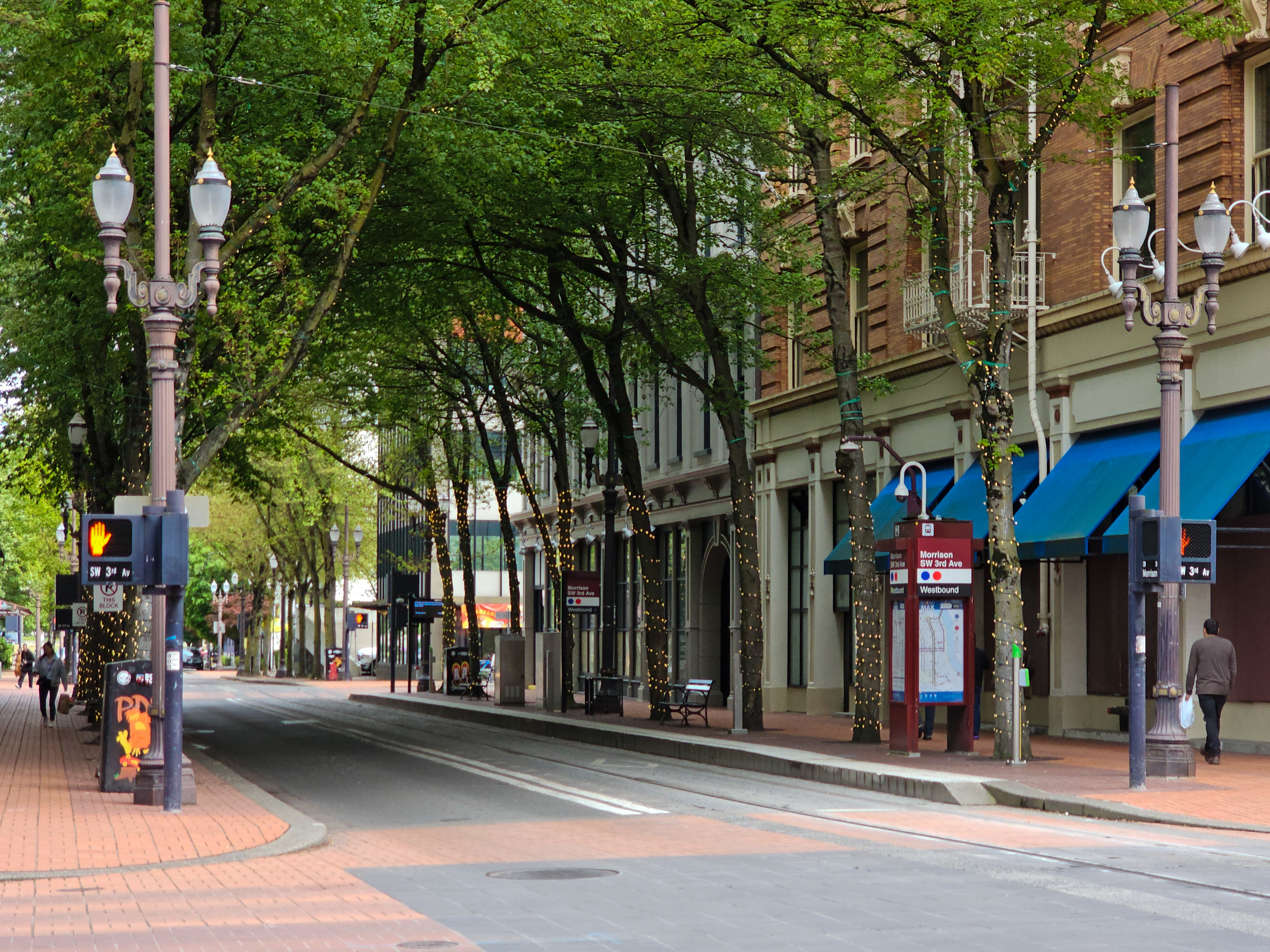
Morrison/SW 3rd Ave, a surface station in downtown Portland

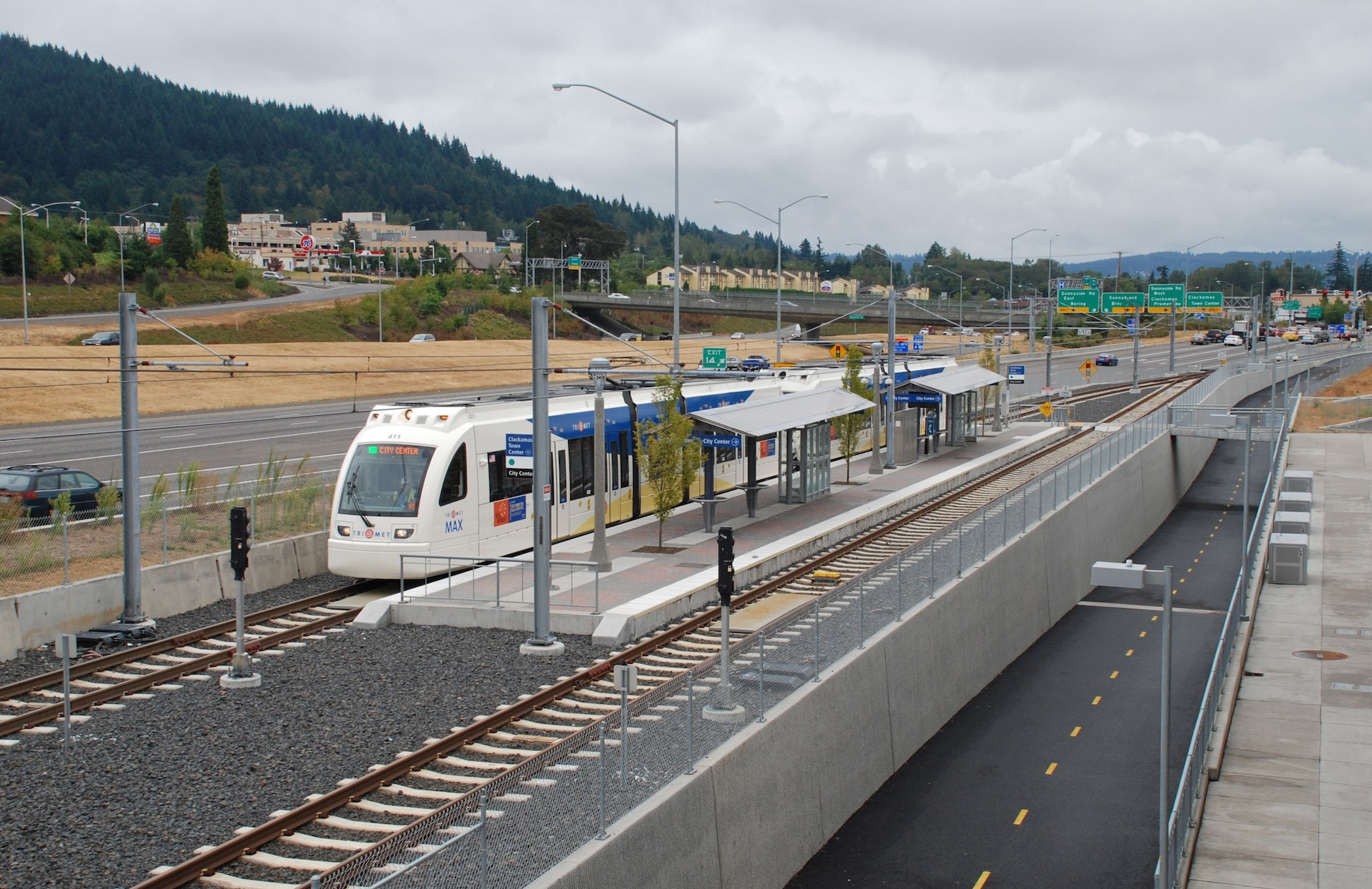
Clackamas Town Center Transit Center, a station alongside Interstate 205

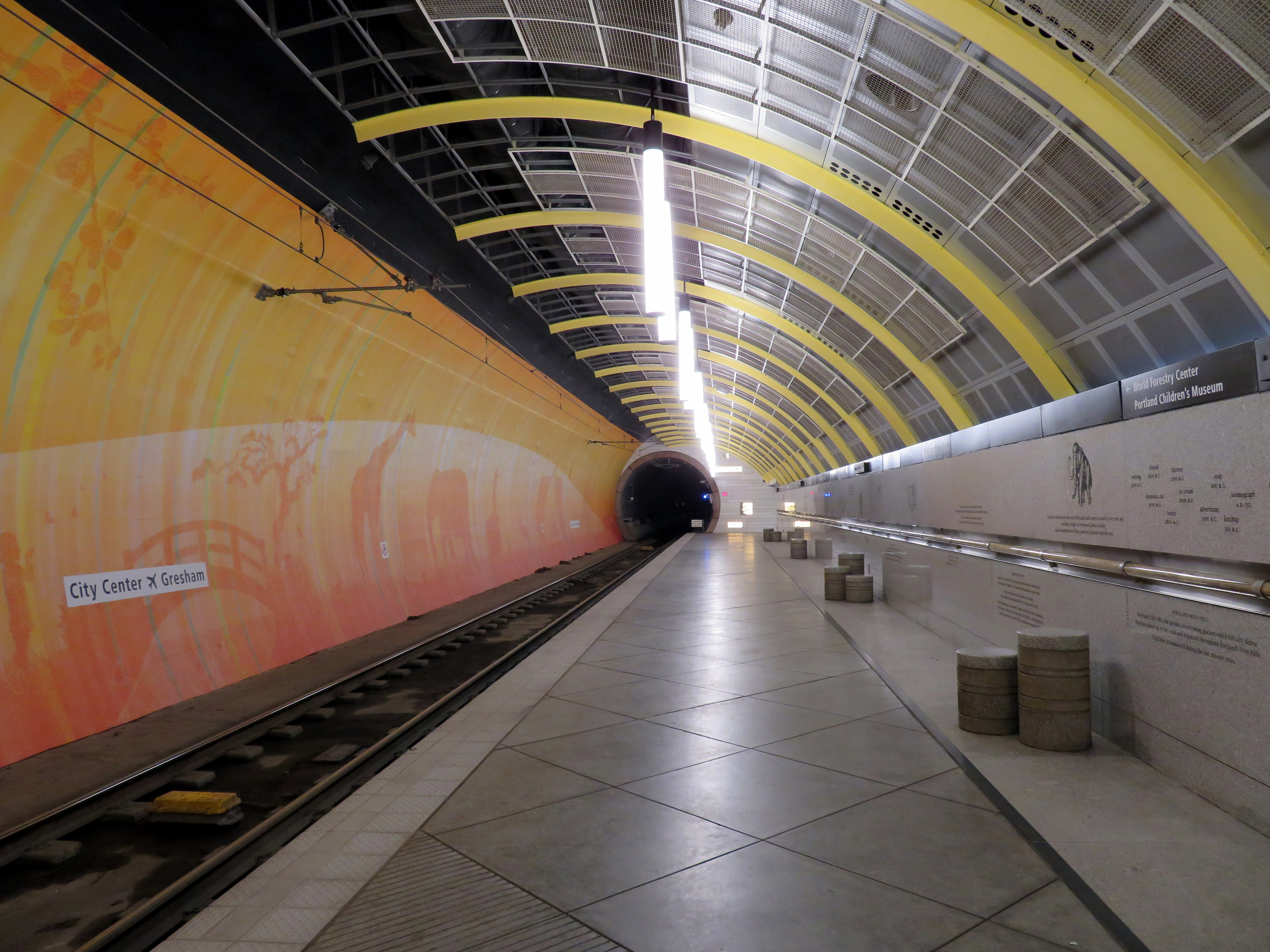
Washington Park, the only underground MAX station

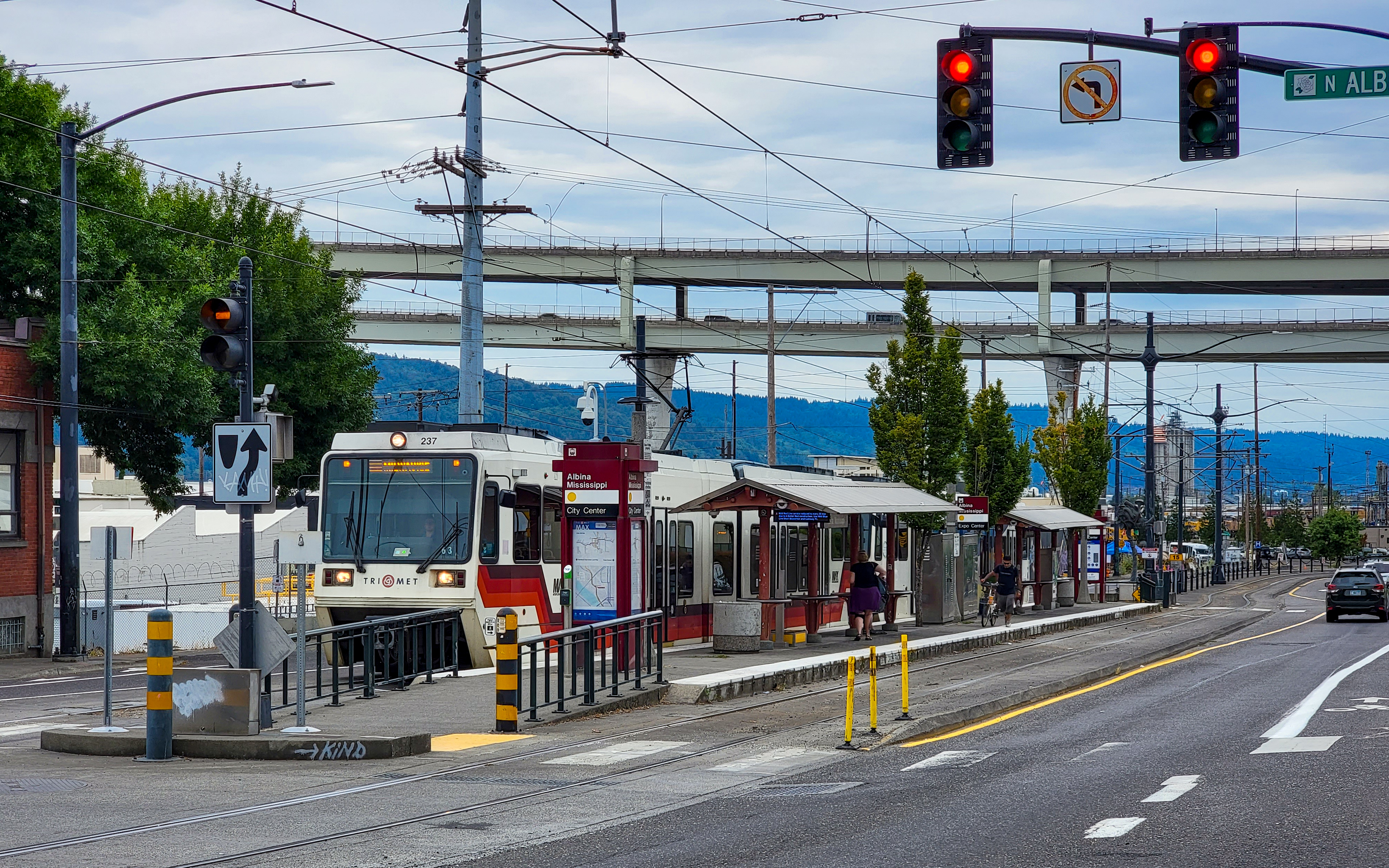
Albina/Mississippi, a surface station along the median of Interstate Avenue

=== Accessibility ===
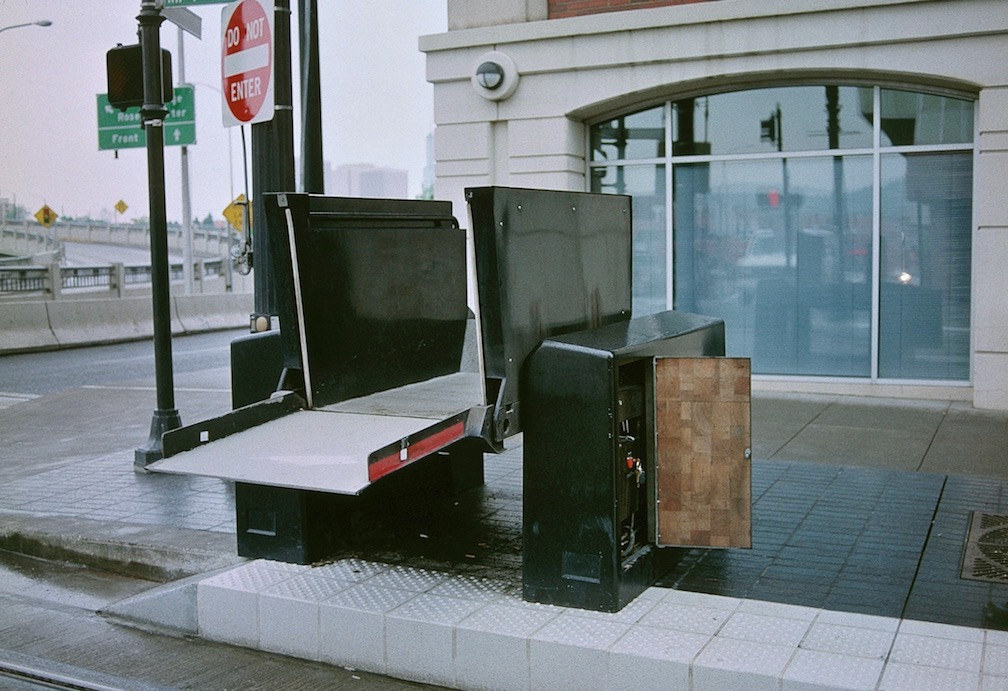
A wayside wheelchair lift undergoing maintenance at Old Town/Chinatown station in 1996

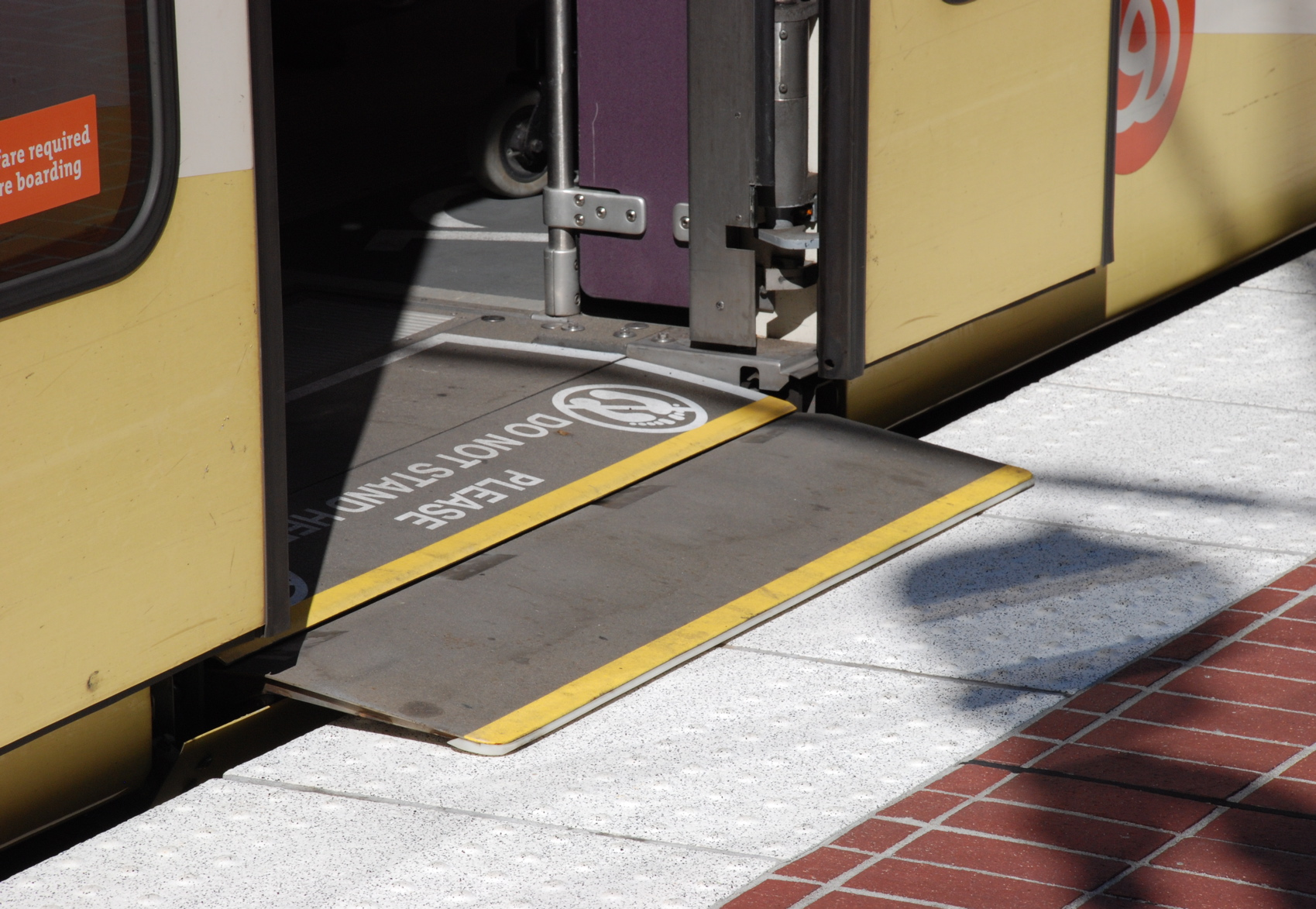
An extended doorway bridgeplate in a low-floor MAX car and tactile paving on the platform

Stations built as part of the Banfield Light Rail Project were originally equipped with electric wheelchair lifts to allow riders using mobility devices to board the system’s high-floor, first-generation vehicles. Due to mechanical and operational issues, only a dozen of the planned 54 lifts serving all 25 stations had been installed by the time the line opened; the final one was installed in May 1987. Each station had two lifts, one for each direction of travel. They were installed on platforms rather than on trains to prevent malfunctions from delaying service, but as ridership increased, the lifts themselves became a source of delays. Many users also felt stigmatized by their "boxy" design and time-consuming operation.

In January 1992, TriMet developed a paratransit plan in accordance with the Americans with Disabilities Act (ADA). Shortly before the start of the Westside MAX project, MAX became the first light rail system in North America to procure low-floor vehicles, following a TriMet study of European systems. The low-floor cars, jointly developed by TriMet and Siemens, entered service on August 31, 1997. By October 5, 1997, enough low-floor light rail cars had been accepted for service that TriMet could ensure that every car or train in service included at least one low-floor car, and use of the platform wheelchair lifts was discontinued. Removal of the lifts from all stations began in November 1997.

While the system had been fully accessible to riders in wheelchairs since 1987, the addition of other accessibility features in subsequent years led to MAX's achieving full accessibility in April 1999. Ticket vending machines provide information and instructions in audio, braille, and raised lettering. Station platforms also have signs with braille and raised lettering to indicate which lines provide service and where they go. The edge of platforms have tactile paving to warn riders from standing too close to the edge. Non-street-level platforms may be accessed with elevators. Most light rail cars, with the exception of Type 1, are low-floor and have ramps that extend onto platforms to allow mobility devices to board. High-floor Type 1 cars are paired with low-floor Type 2 or 3 cars to maintain accessibility. In each train, an audio system and LED signs announce the name of each upcoming station. All trains have spaces and priority seating areas reserved for seniors and people with disabilities, and service animals are permitted on board.

In 2011, TriMet began upgrading the oldest sections of MAX to improve pedestrian safety and compliance with updated ADA standards. TriMet installed pipe barriers at Gateway Transit Center platform crossings to force pedestrians to slow down and face oncoming trains before crossing the tracks and realigned sidewalks and crosswalks at four at-grade crossings in Gresham. Other improvements made throughout the line include the installation of pedestrian warning signals and tactile paving upgrades.

=== Parking ===
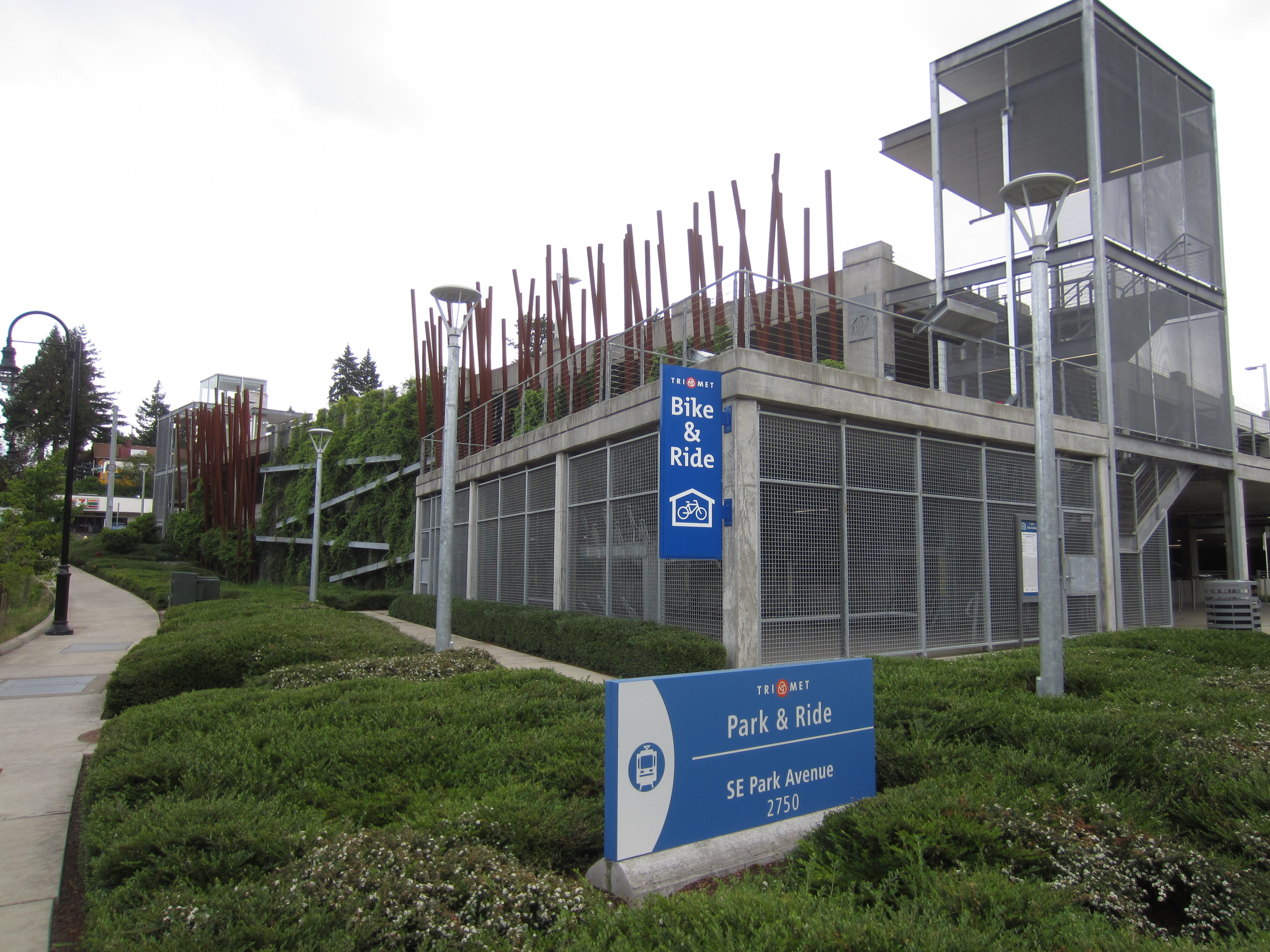
A park and ride with a bike and ride component at SE Park Ave station

Based on a report published in 2019, TriMet provides a total of 12,614 park-and-ride spaces, of which 10,219 directly serve 25 MAX stations. The agency's parking facilities are either surface lots or multi-level garages, and they are free to use. TriMet allows vehicles to park at most stalls overnight as long as they do not exceed 24 hours. At some locations, TriMet negotiates with nearby establishments for additional parking spaces. Westside MAX stations contain 3,643 parking spaces, the most number of spaces in a corridor. Clackamas Town Center Transit Center on the I-205 MAX segment includes a 750-space parking garage, the largest capacity of any single MAX station. Southeast Holgate Boulevard station, also on the I-205 MAX, provides the fewest parking spaces with 125 stalls.

In the 2019 report, passengers originating from TriMet park and rides accounted for five percent of TriMet's total weekday ridership. In 2017, the Portland–Milwaukie segment had a 100-percent usage rate of its available spaces while the Westside MAX segment had 85 percent. The corridor with the lowest use of available parking spaces was the I-205 MAX at 30 percent; TriMet attributes this to factors such as inconvenient lot access and the Green Line's indirect route to downtown Portland compared with the availability of more direct bus routes. The cost-per-space for building park and rides is estimated at $18,000 per surface-lot space and $52,000 per structured space.

TriMet additionally offers four different bicycle parking options at its MAX stations, although not all options are available at every station. Bike and rides are secure, enclosed spaces that are accessible by keycard and are monitored 24 hours per day by security cameras; as of 2020 they are available at eight stations. Electronic bicycle lockers, or eLockers, are secure lockers that may also be accessed by keycard and are made available on a first-come, first-served basis. TriMet contracts some keycard access to BikeLink and uses its Hop Fastpass on others. Other lockers may be rented by users. Bicycle racks are the most common form of bicycle parking.

=== Public art ===
MAX stations often feature pieces of public artwork commissioned by TriMet's Public Art Program. The first MAX segment, the Eastside MAX, opened in 1986 without an art program. In 1992, TriMet formed an art program for the Westside MAX project.

== Service ==
From Monday to Thursday, MAX trains run for 22 1/2 hours per day. Additional late-night trips are provided on Fridays, and except for additional late-night trips on Saturdays, weekend service runs on a slightly reduced schedule. TriMet designates all MAX lines as "Frequent Service" routes, which ensures service runs on a 15-minute headway for most of each day. During the early morning and late evening hours, trains operate with headways of up to 30 minutes. On segments where lines overlap, headways can be as short as 7 1/2 minutes most of the day. At many stations, a live display shows the destination and time-to-arrival of the next several trains using data gathered by a vehicle tracking system installed on the light rail tracks.

=== Ridership ===
MAX carried 22.1 million passengers in 2025 and averaged 66,300 riders per day on weekdays in the second quarter of 2026. MAX ridership peaked in 2012, when the system recorded around 42.2 million annual passengers, and declined through the late 2010s. TriMet attributes falling ridership to perceived crime within trains and stations and lower-income riders being forced out of urban neighborhoods by rising housing prices. In 2019 (prior to the COVID-19 pandemic), MAX was the fourth-busiest light rail system in the United States after Metro Rail in Los Angeles, the MBTA in Boston, and Muni Metro in San Francisco. By 2025, MAX had fallen to seventh among light rail systems in the United States.

=== Fares ===
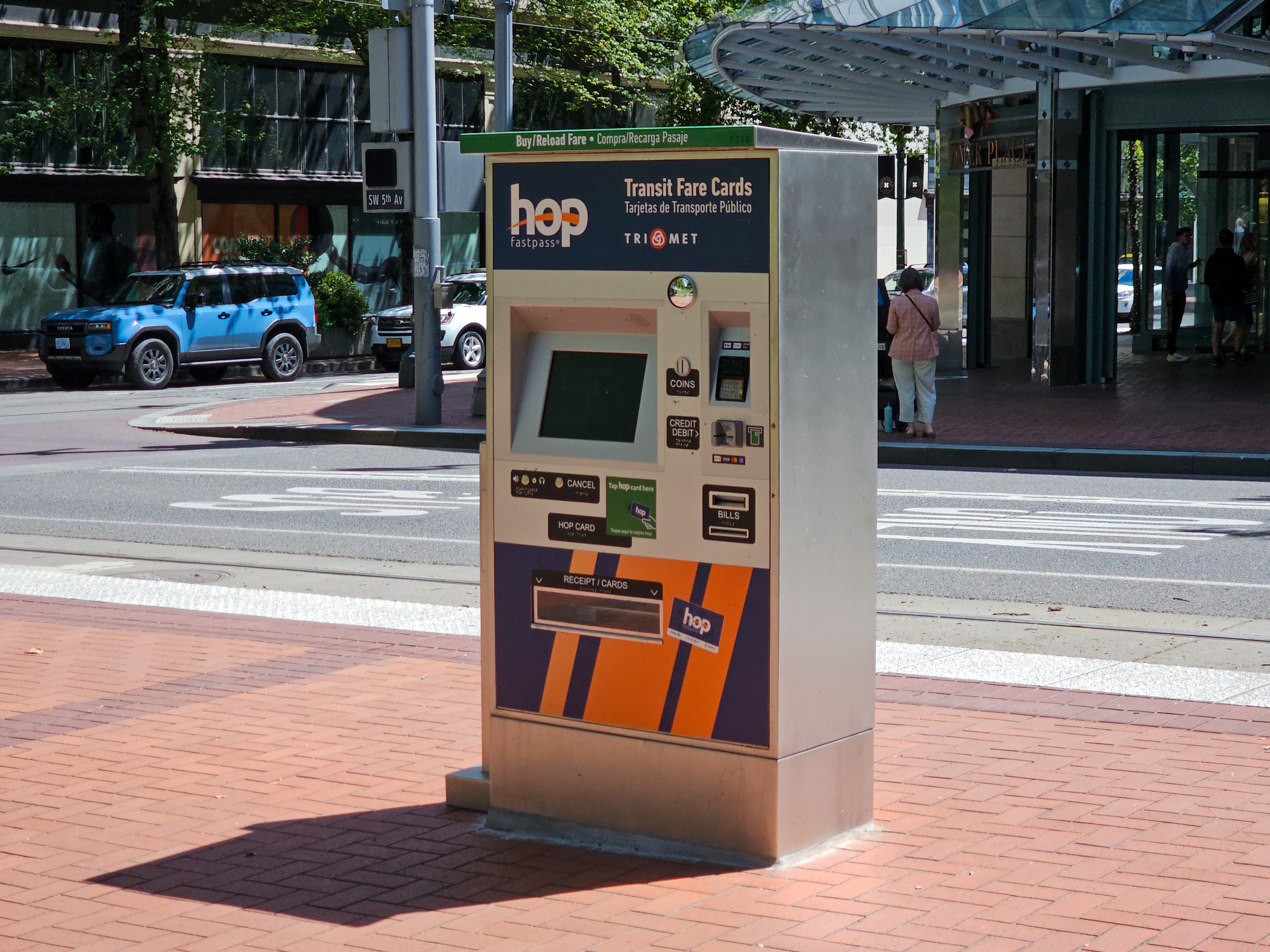
A TriMet ticket vending machine, introduced in 2025, seen at Pioneer Place/SW 5th station

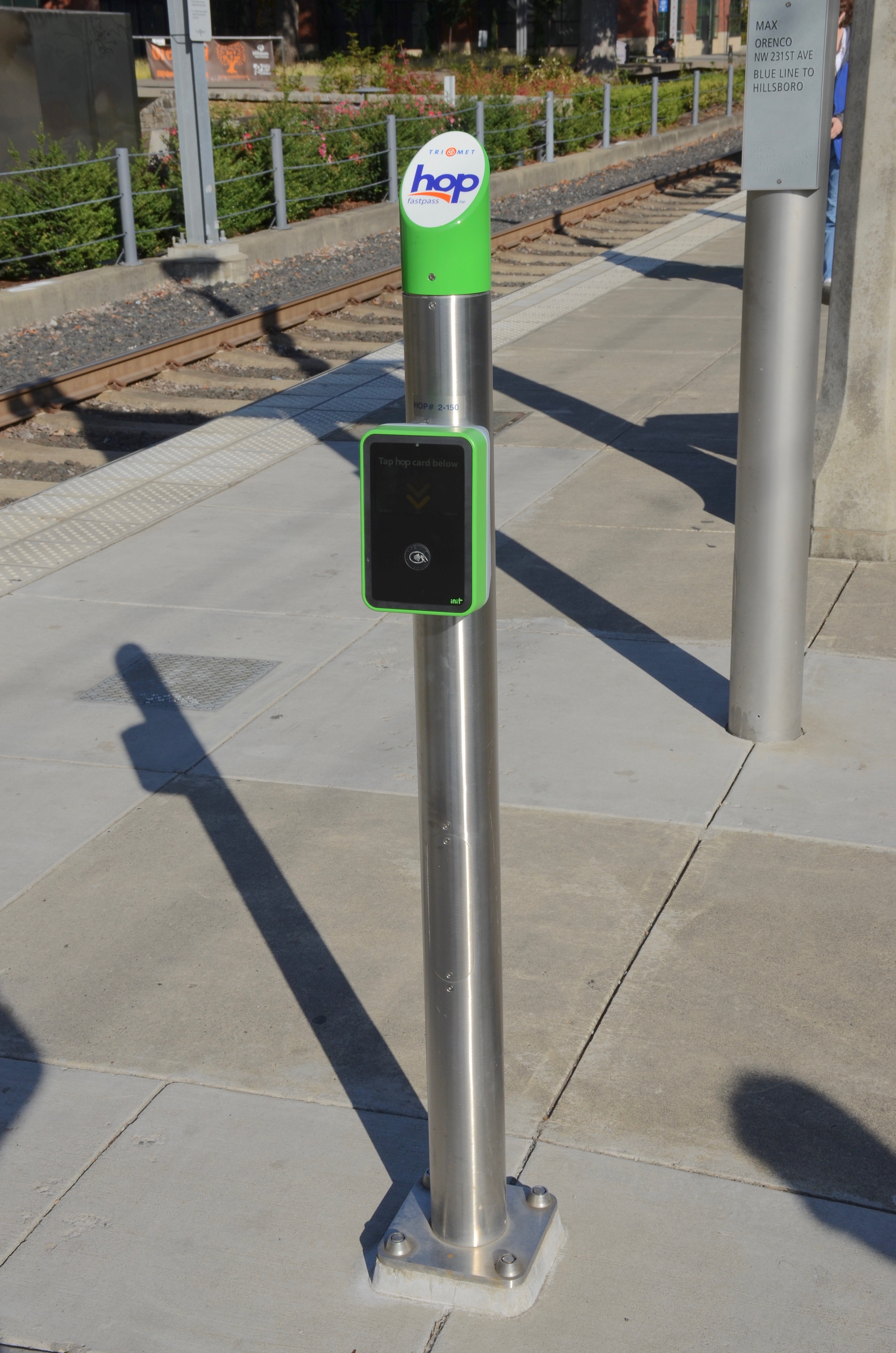
A Hop Fastpass card and ticket reader at a MAX station

As is standard practice on North American light rail systems, MAX uses proof-of-payment for fare collection, and stations do not have ticket barriers. Since 2017, TriMet has employed an automated fare collection system through a stored-value, contactless smart card called Hop Fastpass, which can be purchased from the TriMet ticket office or participating retail outlets. Smartphone users may download a virtual version of Hop Fastpass, while single-use Hop Fastpass tickets are dispensed by ticket vending machines at every MAX station. Smartphones with a debit or credit card loaded into Google Pay, Samsung Pay, or Apple Pay, and Portland Streetcar 2 1/2-hour tickets and one-day passes can also be used to board MAX. Riders must tap their fare medium onto a card reader with each boarding. Fares are flat rate and are capped according to use. Using Hop Fastpass, riders may transfer to the Portland Streetcar and other TriMet and C-Tran services.

In 2025, TriMet replaced all of its ticket vending machines with new machines that dispense only Hop cards at all of its stations, in a project that began in December 2024.

=== Late-night bus service ===
On August 25, 2024, TriMet introduced four new bus routes to replace late-night MAX services, to expand the length of time available each night for routine overnight maintenance. The new routes replace the last one or two MAX trips of the night on the Blue (two bus routes), Red, and Yellow Lines, but not the Green Line. This practice had already been in effect on the Orange Line since its opening in 2015.

== Discontinued services ==
=== Fareless Square ===
From the MAX system's opening until 2012, riding trains within Fareless Square, which was known as the Free Rail Zone from 2010 to 2012, was free of charge. Fareless Square included all of downtown and, starting in 2001, part of the Lloyd District. The 37-year-old fare-free zone was discontinued on September 1, 2012, as part of system-wide cost-cutting measures. As part of the same budget cuts, TriMet discontinued its zonal fares and moved to a flat-fare system. Zones had been in place since 1986; higher fares were charged for longer journeys across four paid zones.

=== MAX Mall Shuttle ===
The MAX Mall Shuttle operated on weekday afternoons from when it was introduced on September 14, 2009, until 2011. It acted as a supplement to the light rail service provided on the Portland Transit Mall by the Green and Yellow lines. The Mall Shuttle operated between Union Station and Portland State University every 30 minutes from noon until 5:30 p.m. TriMet discontinued this supplementary shuttle service on June 5, 2011. Along with bus services, the mall continues to be served by the Yellow Line northbound and the Orange Line southbound, with headways of 15 minutes.

=== Portland Vintage Trolley ===
The Portland Vintage Trolley operated on the MAX system on most weekends from 1991 until 2014, serving the same stops. This service used 1991-built replicas of 1904 Portland streetcars. Originally, the Vintage Trolley service followed a section of the original MAX line between the Library and Galleria stations and Lloyd Center. In September 2009, the service moved to the newly opened MAX alignment along the transit mall, running between Union Station and Portland State University, and remained on this route in subsequent seasons. In 2011, the service was reduced to seven or eight Sundays per year, and in July 2014 it was discontinued entirely and the two remaining faux-vintage cars were sold to a group planning a streetcar line in St. Louis.

== Safety ==
TriMet employs a transit police division to patrol MAX and other TriMet property. Most of its officers serve with local law enforcement agencies and are assigned terms with the transit police; this partnership with local police enables the closest available unit to respond to incidents. TriMet also partners with the Transportation Security Administration, which provides a canine unit. Riders are encouraged to alert TriMet employees using on-board intercoms or to dial 9-1-1 upon witnessing a crime or suspicious activity. TriMet operates over 4,000 security cameras; all MAX trains and stations became fully equipped with cameras in 2014.

=== 2017 train stabbing incident ===
On May 26, 2017, at approximately 4:30 pm, a man fatally stabbed two people and injured a third after he was confronted for shouting anti-Muslim slurs at two teenage girls inside a MAX train. Two men—a technician and U.S. Army veteran, and a recent university graduate—died from wounds to their necks while a third male victim survived. The attacker, who described himself as a white nationalist, was arrested and charged with murder, attempted murder, and other crimes. On February 21, 2020, the perpetrator was found guilty on all charges, including two counts of first-degree murder. This resulted in a mural being painted on the station entrance of the Hollywood Transit Center, where the stabbing occurred.

=== 2023 Portland Streetcar collision ===
On November 15, 2023, shortly after 10:00am, a MAX train collided with a Portland Streetcar in the Lloyd District and injured two people on board.

== See also ==
- List of rail transit systems in the United States
- Transportation in Portland, Oregon
