= I-205 busway =

Abandoned transit project in Portland, Oregon, now used for light rail

Coordinates: 45.50667°N 122.56611°W

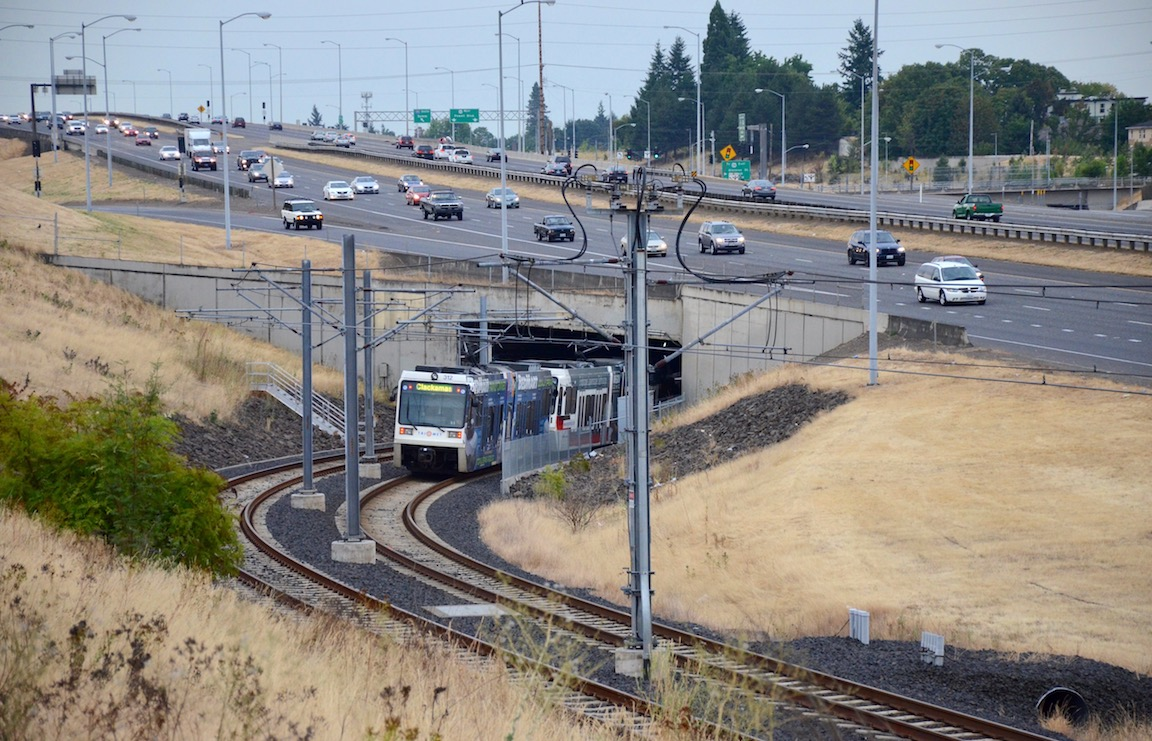
- A MAX Green Line train at the north portal of one of the I-205 busway's two tunnels in 2015. Built in the late 1970s, the tunnels were first brought into use more than two decades later, by the MAX Red Line and later the Green Line.

Overview
- System: MAX Light Rail
- Operator: TriMet
- Status: Busway never opened, but right-of-way built and now used by MAX Red and Green light rail lines

Route
- Route type: Light rail
- Locale: Portland, Oregon
- Via: Interstate 205 (generally alongside it)
- Stations: 7 (planned bus, never built); 10 (light rail)

The I-205 busway was a partially built busway along the right-of-way of the Interstate 205 freeway in Portland, Oregon. Although it never opened as a busway, its right-of-way has been in use by light rail lines partially since 2001 and fully since 2009.

The transitway, which was physically separate from the parallel freeway lanes, was planned in the mid- and late 1970s as part of the final segment of I-205. Only a graded route with several entrance ramps and two underpass tunnels under I-205 were built. No bridges or overpasses were built until later adaptation for use by MAX Light Rail trains.

The transitway's right-of-way started in the median of I-205 near Portland International Airport and ran south to the junction of I-205 & I-84, where it continued through an underpass under the northbound lanes of I-205. From here it followed the freeway's east embankment to just south of Market Street, where it once again entered a tunnel taking it under the freeway. This tunnel took the right-of-way underneath all lanes (both directions) of I-205, surfacing west of the freeway's southbound lanes at a point just north of Division Street. From there, it continued south along the west side of I-205 to SE Foster Road, where it ended. The entire transitway has now been adapted for use by TriMet light rail trains.

== History ==
In the mid-1970s, Multnomah County officials negotiated a number of improvements to the proposed I-205 freeway with the Oregon Department of Transportation in order to win their support. Among them was the transitway, a bike path and reconfigured interchanges. The transitway was intended to connect at Gateway into the proposed Banfield Transitway, which originally was to have been a busway and would have run along I-84 to the Lloyd District and Downtown.

By the late 1970s, light rail became the selected transit mode in the Banfield corridor and opened in 1986 as Portland's first light rail line (now a portion of the MAX Blue Line). When light rail was selected over the busway option in the Banfield corridor, the fate of the proposed I-205 busway was almost sealed. In 1986, the construction of a busway in the right-of-way was still an option under consideration, but light was becoming the preferred mode—recommended by a Metro committee. The corridor had already been considered for a potential future light rail line since the 1970s. The last section of the I-205 freeway opened in 1983. In the late 1980s, after the right-of-way had been built, light-rail proposals generally envisioned a line that would run the length of the I-205 transitway, between the airport and Clackamas Town Center. Ultimately, however, most of the transitway was brought into use in two stages, by two separate MAX Light Rail lines, running north and south from Gateway, rather than one continuous I-205 MAX line.

The MAX Blue Line uses a short portion of the transitway between the Gateway station and Burnside Street, opened in 1986. The portion of the route north from Gateway opened in September 2001 as the Red Line. The portion south from Burnside (and beyond to the Clackamas Town Center) opened in September 2009 as the Green Line.

== Stations ==
Names of possible stations, as originally proposed in the 1970s, with corresponding later developments:

- Sandy-Columbia became the Parkrose/Sumner Transit Center station on the Red Line
- Gateway became the Gateway/Northeast 99th Avenue Transit Center station on the Blue, Green and Red lines
- Mall 205 became the Southeast Main Street station on the Green Line
- Division became Southeast Division Street station on the Green Line
- Powell became Southeast Powell Boulevard station on the Green Line
- Holgate became Southeast Holgate Boulevard station on the Green Line
- Lents became Lents Town Center/Southeast Foster Road station on the Green Line

== See also ==
- Mount Hood Freeway
- I-205 Bike Path
