= SE Flavel St station =

Light rail station in Portland, Oregon, U.S.

SE Flavel St
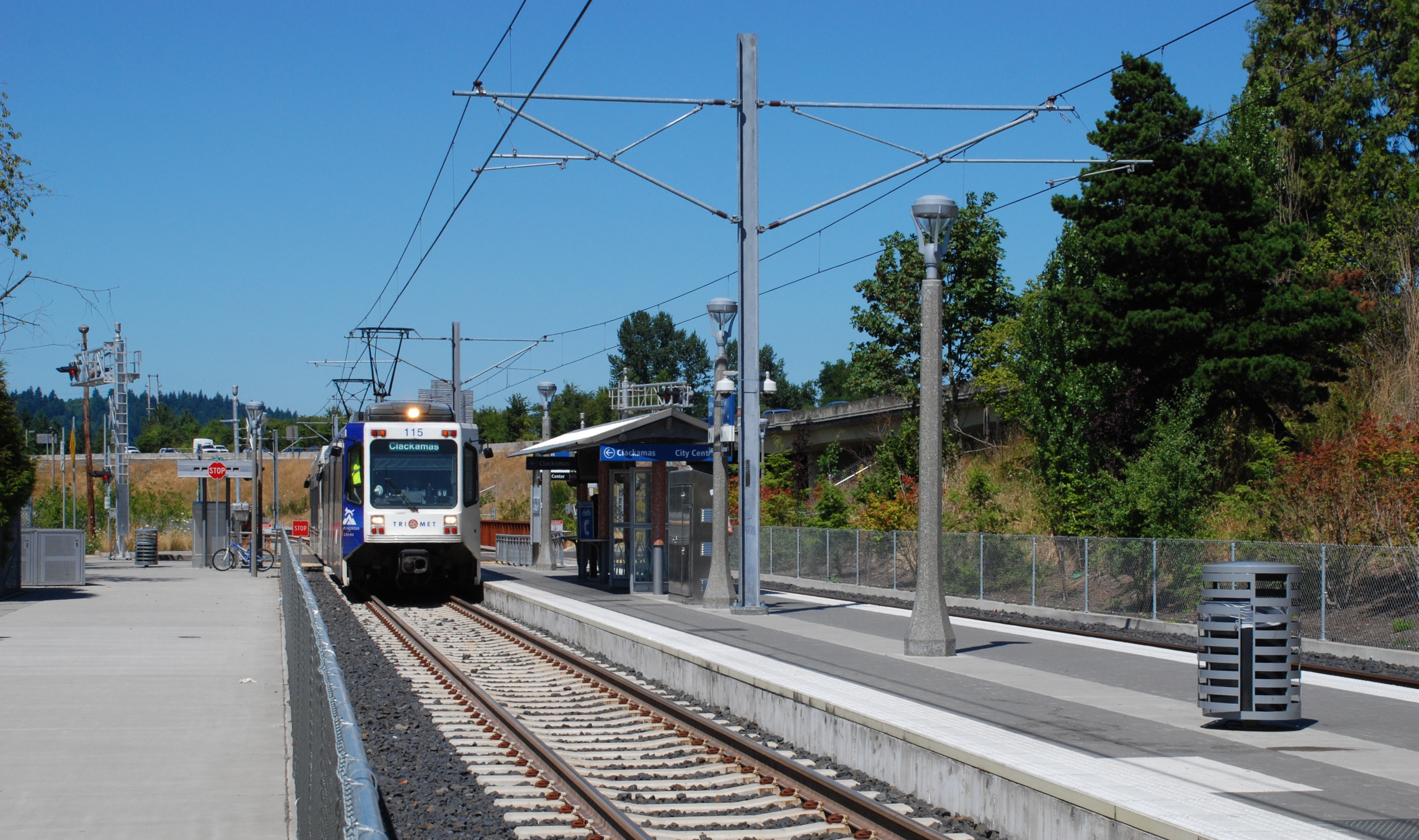
- A southbound train pulling into the station

General information
- Location: 9648 SE Flavel Street; Portland, Oregon; USA
- Coordinates: 45°28′05″N 122°34′00″W
- Owner: TriMet
- Platforms: 1 island platform
- Tracks: 2
- Connections: TriMet: 10

Construction
- Cycle facilities: 8 Bicycle lockers
- Accessible: yes

History
- Opened: September 12, 2009

Services
Preceding station	TriMet	Following station
Lents Town Center/SE Foster Rd toward Gateway/Northeast 99th Avenue Transit Center	Green Line	SE Fuller Rd toward Clackamas Town Center Transit Center
Location

Southeast Flavel Street is a light rail station on the MAX Green Line in Portland, Oregon. It is the sixth stop southbound on the I-205 MAX branch. The station is located at SE Flavel Street, adjacent to Interstate 205, and has a center platform. Johnson Creek flows beneath the interstate and railway tracks, slightly north of the station.

== Bus line connections ==
This station is served by the following bus line:

- 10 - Steele
