= Southeast Division =

The Southeast Division can refer to the following:

- Southeast Division (NBA), in the National Basketball Association
- Southeast Division (NHL), in the National Hockey League
- Southeast Division Street MAX Station, Portland, Oregon
- Queensland Rugby League South East Queensland Division
