= SE Main St station =

LRT station in Portland, Oregon, United States

SE Main Street
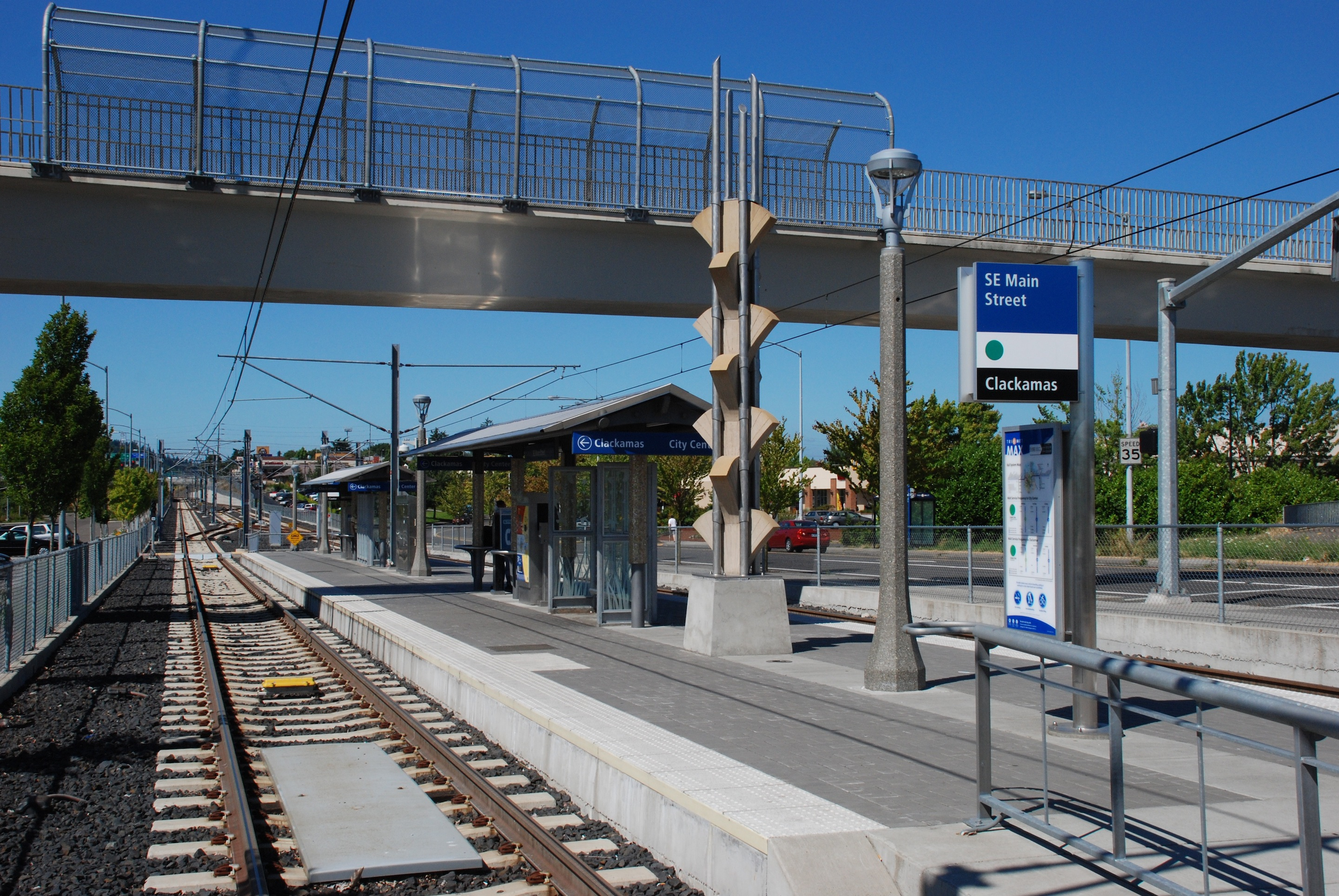

General information
- Location: 1119 SE 96th Avenue; Portland, OR
- Coordinates: 45.514434°N 122.56447°W
- Owner: TriMet
- Platforms: 1 island platform
- Tracks: 2
- Connections: TriMet: 15

Construction
- Parking: 420 Parking Spaces
- Cycle facilities: bike lockers
- Accessible: Accessible to people with mobility devices

History
- Opened: September 12, 2009

Services
Preceding station	TriMet	Following station
Gateway/NE 99th Ave Transit Center Terminus	Green Line	Southeast Division Street toward Clackamas Town Center Transit Center
Location

Southeast Main Street is a light rail station on the MAX Green Line in Portland, Oregon. It is the first stop southbound on the I-205 MAX branch, following the Green Line's split from the Red and Blue lines at the Gateway Transit Center.

The station is located at the intersection of SE 96th Avenue and Main Street. It is adjacent to Interstate 205, and is located near Mall 205, Adventist Medical Center, and surrounding businesses. This station has a center platform, and has a park-and-ride lot to the west of (and extending south from) the station.

== Park-and-ride lot ==
The park-and-ride lot is connected to Main Street via a level crossing over the MAX tracks. It has 420 parking spaces, and is open all day.

== Bus line connections ==
This station is served by bus line 15 – Belmont/NW 23rd.
