= Lents Town Center/SE Foster Rd station =

Light rail station in Portland, Oregon, U.S.

Lents Town Center/ SE Foster Rd
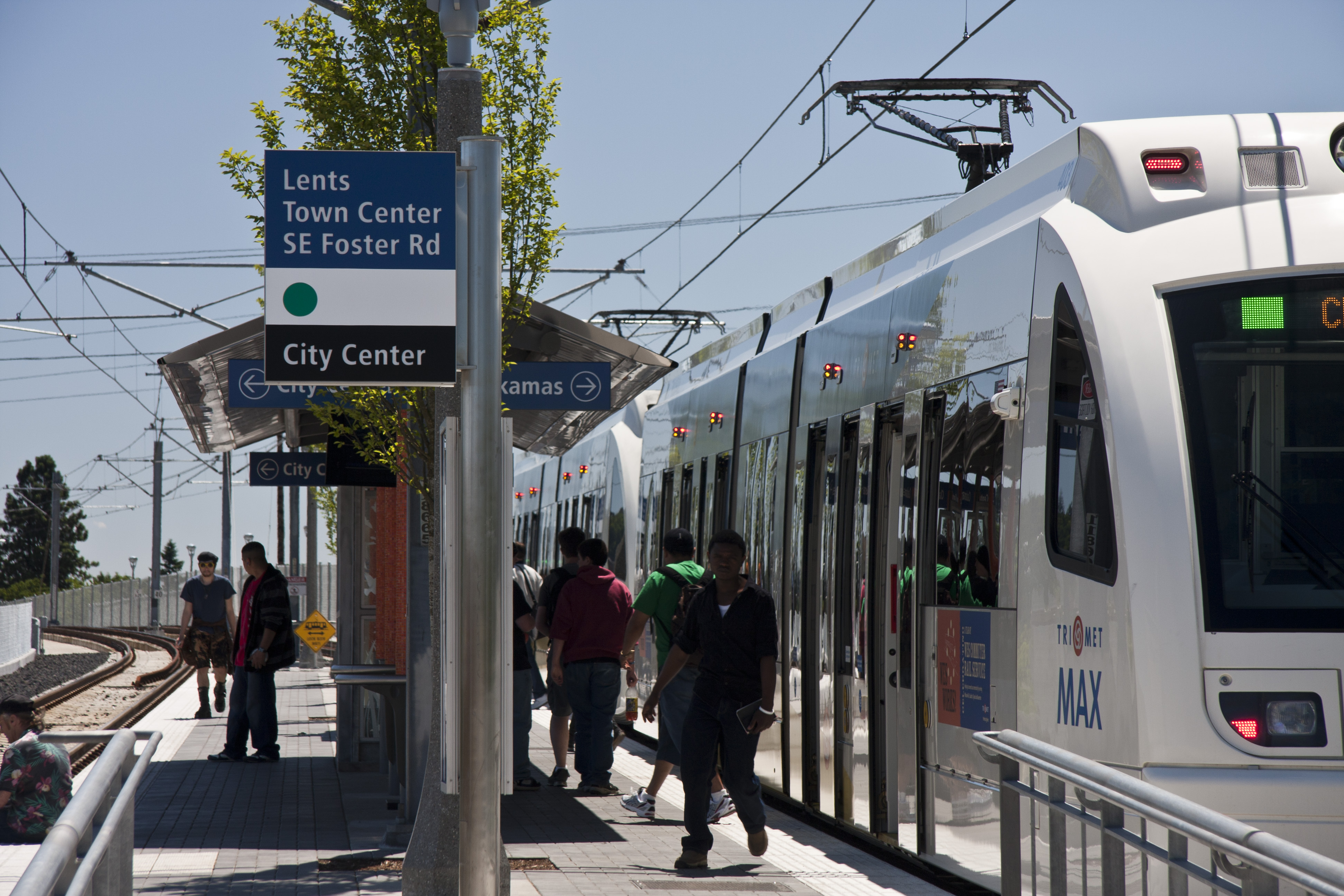
- Passengers disembark a Clackamas-bound train

General information
- Location: 9451 SE Foster Road; Portland, Oregon; USA
- Coordinates: 45°28′49″N 122°34′00″W
- Owner: TriMet
- Platforms: 1 island platform
- Tracks: 2
- Connections: TriMet: 4, 14, 73, 86

Construction
- Cycle facilities: 10 Bicycle lockers
- Accessible: Accessible to people with mobility devices

History
- Opened: September 12, 2009

Services
Preceding station	TriMet	Following station
SE Holgate Blvd toward Gateway/Northeast 99th Avenue Transit Center	Green Line	SE Flavel St toward Clackamas Town Center Transit Center
Location

Lents Town Center/Southeast Foster Road is a light rail station on the MAX Green Line in Portland, Oregon. It is the 5th stop southbound on the I-205 MAX branch. The station is at the intersection of Interstate 205 and Foster Road. It is located in the Lents neighborhood's town center business district. It also provides access to the Springwater Corridor, which was once a transit line to the suburbs and is now a dedicated bikeway through southeast Portland.

== Bus line connections ==
This station is served by the following bus lines:

- 4 - Fessenden/Woodstock
- 14 - Hawthorne/Foster
- 73 - 122nd Ave
- 86 - 148th Ave
