= SE Holgate Blvd station =

Light rail station in Portland, Oregon, U.S.

SE Holgate Boulevard
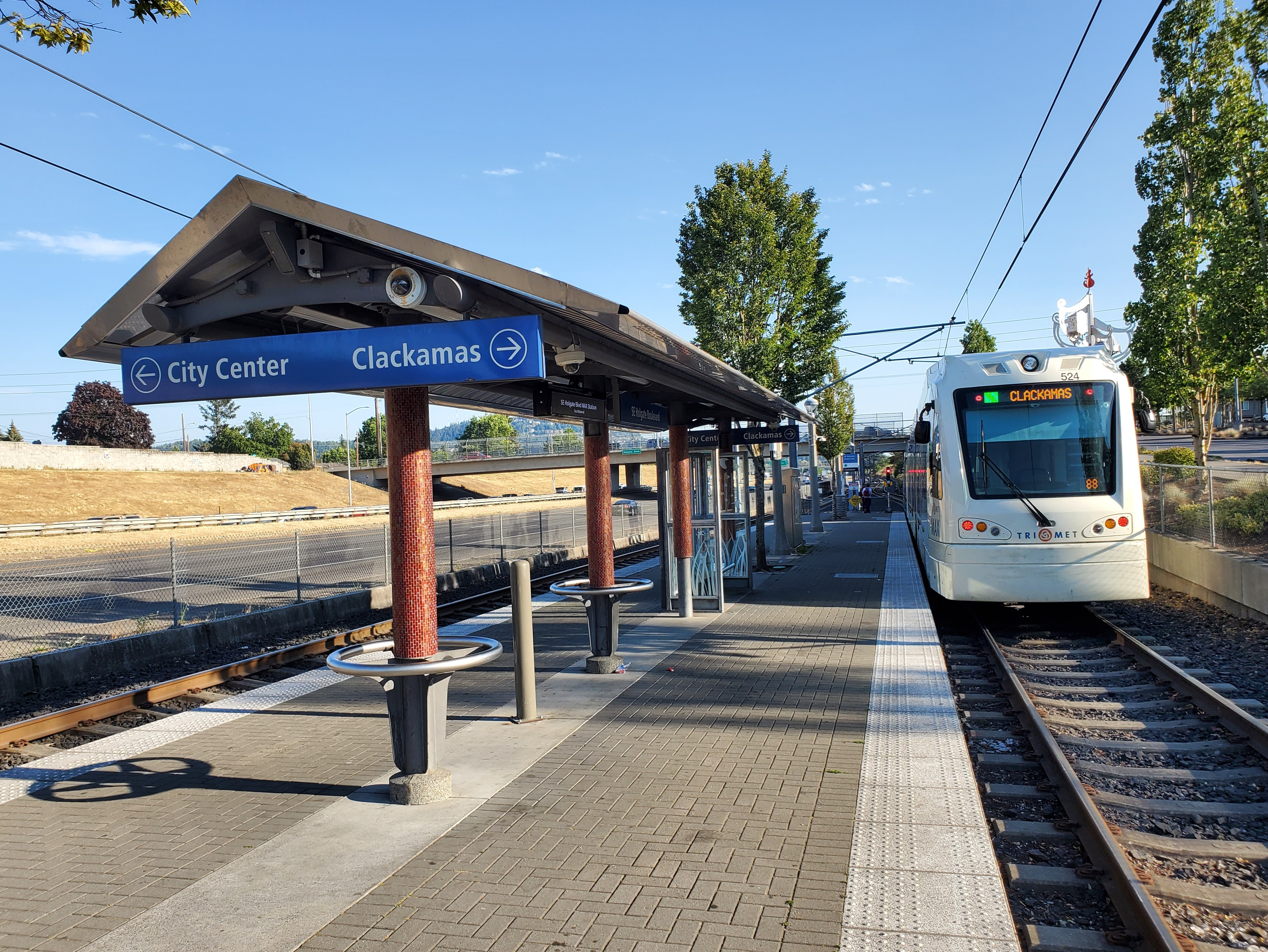
- A Green Line train leaving the station in 2024

General information
- Location: 9369 SE Holgate Boulevard; Lents, Portland, Oregon; USA
- Coordinates: 45°29′27″N 122°33′59″W
- Owner: TriMet
- Platforms: 1 island platform
- Tracks: 2
- Connections: TriMet: 17

Construction
- Parking: 125 spaces
- Cycle facilities: 8 bicycle lockers
- Accessible: Accessible to people with mobility devices

History
- Opened: September 12, 2009, 17 years ago

Services
Preceding station	TriMet	Following station
SE Powell Blvd toward Gateway/Northeast 99th Avenue Transit Center	Green Line	Lents Town Center/SE Foster Rd toward Clackamas Town Center Transit Center
Location

Southeast Holgate Boulevard is a light rail station on the MAX Green Line in Portland, Oregon. It is the 4th stop southbound on the I-205 MAX branch. The station is at the intersection of Interstate 205 and Holgate Boulevard. It has a center platform, and has a park-and-ride facility on the west side. Lents Park is located slightly to the southwest of the station.

== Bus line connections ==
This station in Lents is served by the following bus lines:

- 17 - Holgate/NE 33rd
