= SE Powell Blvd station =

Light rail station in Portland, Oregon, U.S.

SE Powell Boulevard
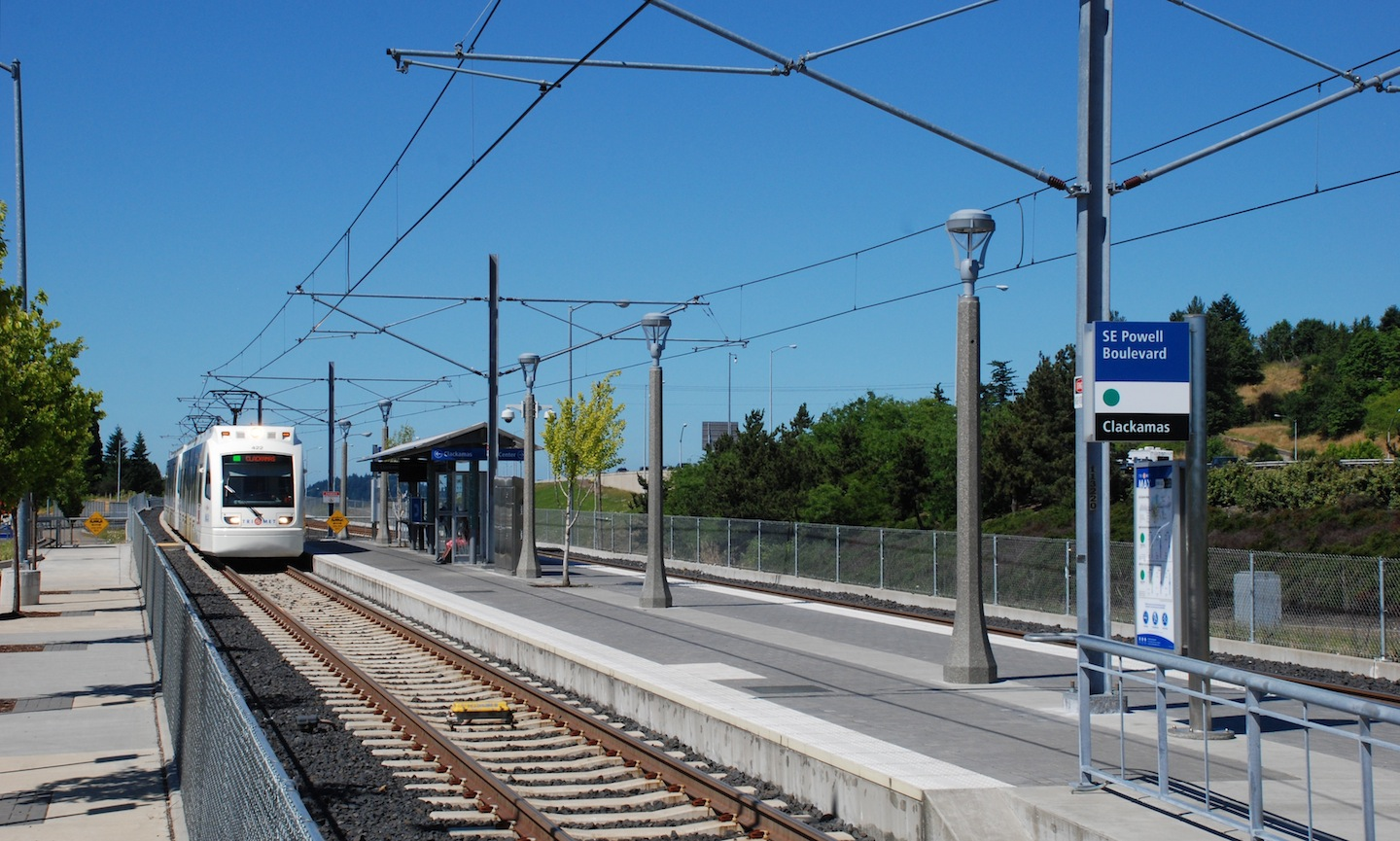
- A southbound train pulling into the station

General information
- Location: 3618 SE 92nd Avenue; Portland, Oregon; USA
- Coordinates: 45°29′46″N 122°33′58″W
- Owner: TriMet
- Platforms: 1 island platform
- Tracks: 2
- Connections: TriMet: 9

Construction
- Parking: 391 parking spaces
- Cycle facilities: bike lockers
- Accessible: yes

History
- Opened: September 12, 2009

Services
| Preceding station | TriMet | Following station |
|---|---|---|
| SE Division St toward Gateway/NE 99th Ave Transit Center | Green Line | SE Holgate Blvd toward Clackamas Town Center Transit Center |
Location

Southeast Powell Boulevard is a light rail station on the MAX Green Line in Portland, Oregon. It is the 3rd stop southbound on the I-205 MAX branch.

The station is located off of Southeast 92nd Avenue and Powell Boulevard. It is adjacent to Interstate 205, and offers connections to the I-205 Bike Path. This station has a center platform, and is surrounded by a park-and-ride facility.

== Bus line connections ==
This station is served by the following bus lines:

- 9 - Powell Blvd
