= SE Fuller Rd station =

Light rail station in Portland, Oregon, U.S.

SE Fuller Road
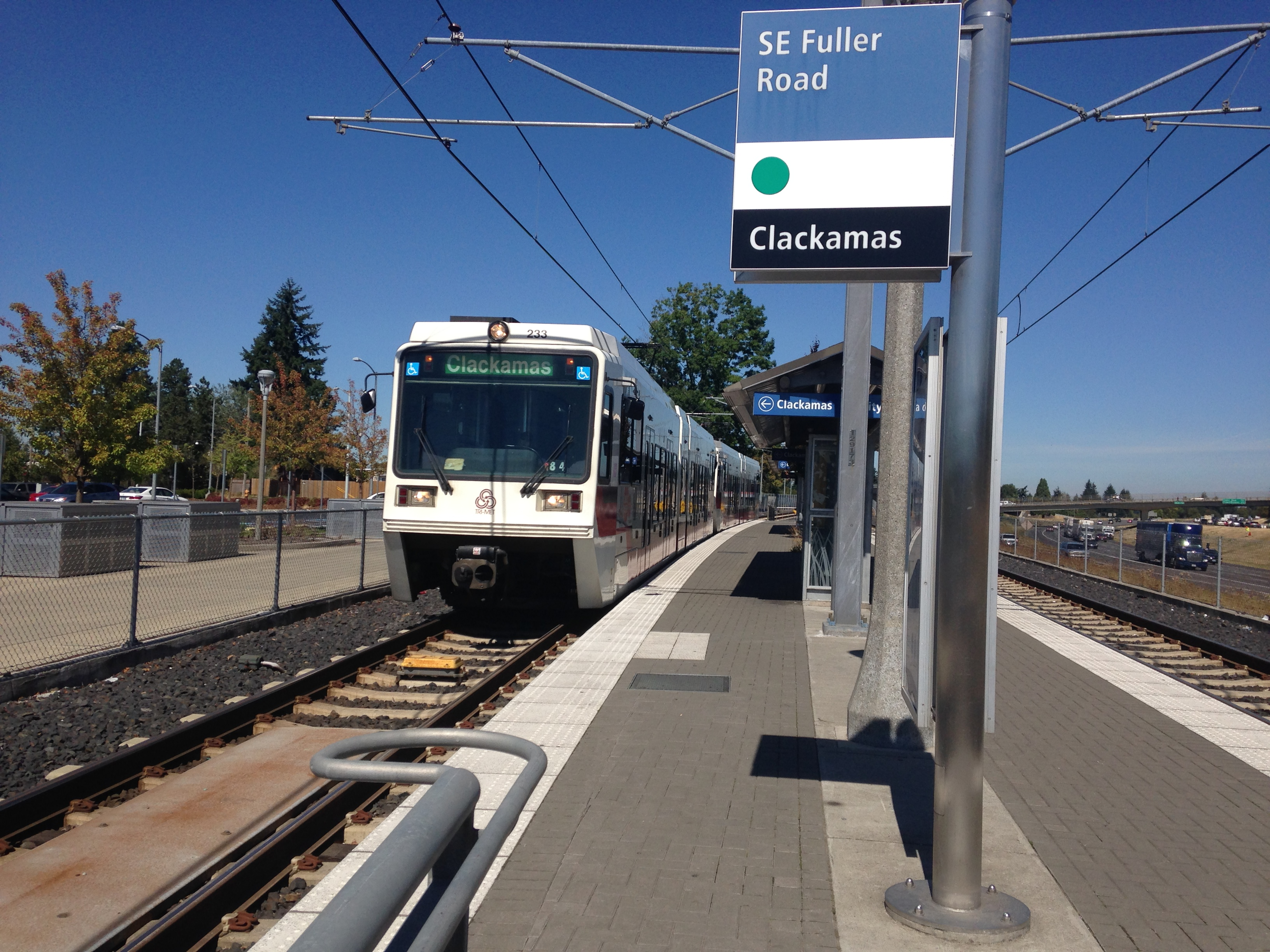
- A southbound train pulling into the station

General information
- Location: 9608 SE Fuller Road; Clackamas, Oregon; USA
- Coordinates: 45°27′11″N 122°34′25″W
- Owner: TriMet
- Platforms: 1 island platform
- Tracks: 2
- Connections: TriMet: 40 (school trips only, discontinued 9/25/2026)

Construction
- Parking: 630 park and ride spaces
- Cycle facilities: 30 bicycle lockers
- Accessible: yes

History
- Opened: September 12, 2009

Services
Preceding station	TriMet	Following station
SE Flavel St toward Gateway/NE 99th Ave Transit Center	Green Line	Clackamas Town Center Transit Center Terminus
Location

Southeast Fuller Road is a light rail station on TriMet's MAX Green Line in Portland, Oregon, located between SE 82nd Avenue and Interstate 205. It is the 7th stop southbound on the Interstate 205 MAX branch. The station has a center platform and is surrounded by a park and ride facility.

A month before the station went into service, Clackamas County land use planners went public with a proposal to make the area surrounding the station subject to a type of zoning that would be new to the county, one based on a form-based code. Planners think such a change would promote transit-oriented development and a "denser, more vibrant mix of uses in the area", which is currently dominated by surface parking and big-box stores. The station is on the eastern edge of the county's North Clackamas Revitalization Area, an urban renewal district established in 2006.

== Bus line connections ==
This station is served by the following bus line (discontinued 9/25/2026):

- 40 - Tacoma/Swan Island (Cleveland High School trips to and from Sellwood Bridge and Fuller Rd MAX only to Marshall High School during Cleveland High School construction).
