= MAX Green Line =

Light rail line in Portland, Oregon

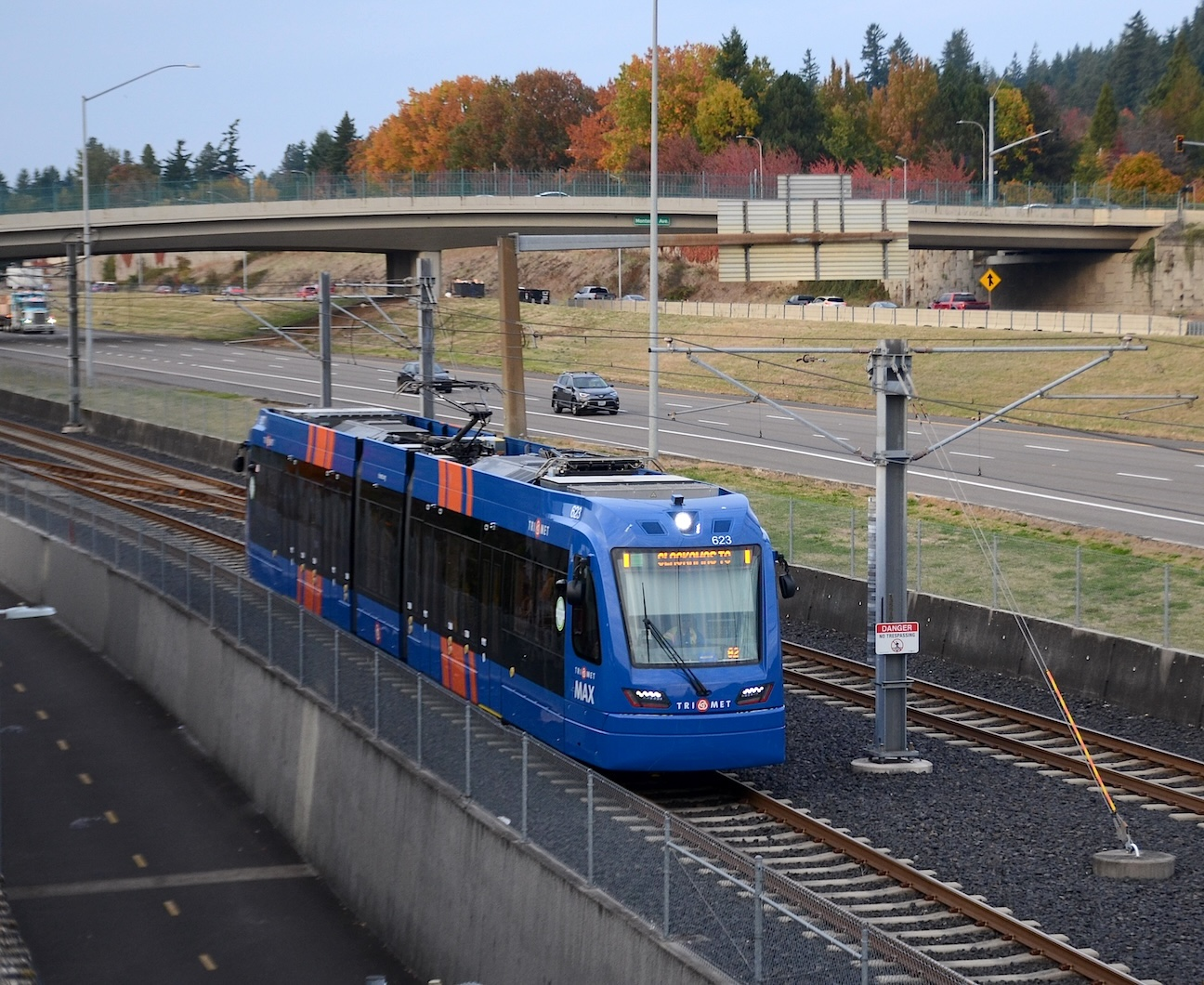
- A Green Line train approaching Clackamas Town Center Transit Center

Overview
- Other name: I-205/Portland Mall Light Rail Project
- Owner: TriMet
- Locale: Portland, Oregon, U.S.
- Termini: Gateway Transit Center (north); Clackamas Town Center Transit Center (south)
- Stations: 9
- Website: MAX Green Line

Service
- Type: Light rail
- System: MAX Light Rail
- Operator: TriMet
- Daily ridership: 10,383 (2025, weekdays)

History
- Opened: September 12, 2009; 17 years ago (Note: Green Line service commenced on September 12, 2009, during the opening of the I-205 MAX segment. The Portland Mall segment, which was part of the project, opened earlier on August 30 with inaugural service from the Yellow Line.)

Technical
- Line length: 6.5 mi (10.5 km)
- Num of tracks: 2
- Character: At-grade, elevated, and underground
- Track gauge: 4 ft 8 1/2 in (1,435 mm) standard gauge
- Electrification: Overhead line, 750 V DC

The MAX Green Line is a light rail line serving the Portland metropolitan area in the U.S. state of Oregon. Part of TriMet's MAX Light Rail system, it connects Northeast and Southeast Portland with Clackamas. The line extends 6.5 miles (10.5 km) along the Interstate 205 (I-205) corridor, serving nine stations from Clackamas Town Center Transit Center to Gateway Transit Center, where it connects with the Blue and Red lines. Trains run at frequencies of 15 to 30 minutes. In May 2025, the Green Line carried an average of 11,202 passengers on weekdays.

Planning for light rail along I-205 began in the mid-1980s with an initial proposal for a route connecting Portland International Airport and Clackamas Town Center via the I-205 busway. Over the following decade, plans shifted from the I-205 corridor and culminated in the South/North Corridor project, which failed to secure voter-approved funding in multiple ballot measures. In 2001, the project was partially revived as the two-phased South Corridor Transportation Project, which proposed light rail along I-205 and the Portland Transit Mall in its first phase. (Note: The second phase of the South Corridor Transportation Project was the Portland–Milwaukie Light Rail Project (MAX Orange Line).) The I-205/Portland Mall Light Rail Project was approved in 2003, and construction began in early 2007. The Portland Transit Mall segment opened on August 30, 2009, followed by the I-205 segment and the launch of Green Line service on September 12, 2009.

On August 23, 2026, the Green Line was shortened to operate only between Gateway Transit Center and Clackamas Town Center Transit Center as part of systemwide service cuts to TriMet, making it the only MAX line that does not serve downtown Portland.

== I-205 segment history ==
=== Early proposals ===
While construction of what would become the first segment of the Metropolitan Area Express (MAX) between downtown Portland and Gresham progressed in the mid-1980s, regional government Metro unveiled plans for the Portland metropolitan area's next light rail line to serve Clackamas County. Metro proposed two routes: one between Portland International Airport and Clackamas Town Center via the I-205 freeway, and another between downtown Portland, Milwaukie, and Oregon City via McLoughlin Boulevard. A panel of local and state officials known as the Joint Policy Advisory Committee on Transportation (JPACT) endorsed the I-205 route in 1987 with a request to start preliminary engineering for light rail along this corridor in lieu of an originally planned busway. Their preferred alignment had been the I-205 busway, a partially completed, grade-separated transit right-of-way built during I-205's construction several years prior. Regional transit agency TriMet, however, wanted an extension of MAX westward to Hillsboro in Washington County to take priority for federal funding, so the agency called on local businesses and governments in Clackamas County to subsidize the proposed $88 million I-205 route.

A dispute between Washington and Clackamas county officials followed, with Clackamas County vying for additional federal assistance, including $17 million in excess funds sourced from the partially realized I-205 busway. In an effort to settle the dispute, Metro updated its regional transportation plan (RTP) in January 1989 to reassert the westside line's priority and commission preliminary work for the I-205 and McLoughlin Boulevard proposals. The U.S. Senate Committee on Appropriations approved a financing package later in September, which provided $2 million to assess the two segments, but at the behest of U.S. Senators Mark Hatfield of Oregon and Brock Adams of Washington, who were members of the committee, a segment further north to Clark County, Washington became part of the proposals.

Alignment studies initially examined extending the proposed I-205 route further north across the Columbia River to Vancouver Mall or the Clark County Fairgrounds. As the studies analyzed various alternative routes, however, support shifted to an alignment along the busier I-5 and Willamette River corridors. A 25-mile (40 km) route from Hazel Dell, Washington through downtown Portland to Clackamas Town Center called the "South/North Corridor" was finalized in 1994. Estimated to cost around $2.8 billion, Portland area voters approved a $475 million bond measure in November 1994 to cover Oregon's share. A Clark County vote to fund Washington's portion, which would have been sourced through sales and vehicle excise tax increases, was subsequently defeated on February 7, 1995. TriMet later sought funding for various scaled-back revisions of the South/North project following a general route between North Portland and Clackamas Town Center that voters went on to reject in 1996 and 1998. In 1997, an unsolicited proposal from engineering company Bechtel led to a public–private partnership that built an extension of MAX to Portland International Airport using the northern half of the I-205 busway from Gateway/Northeast 99th Avenue Transit Center; this extension opened in 2001 with service from the Red Line.

=== Revival and funding ===
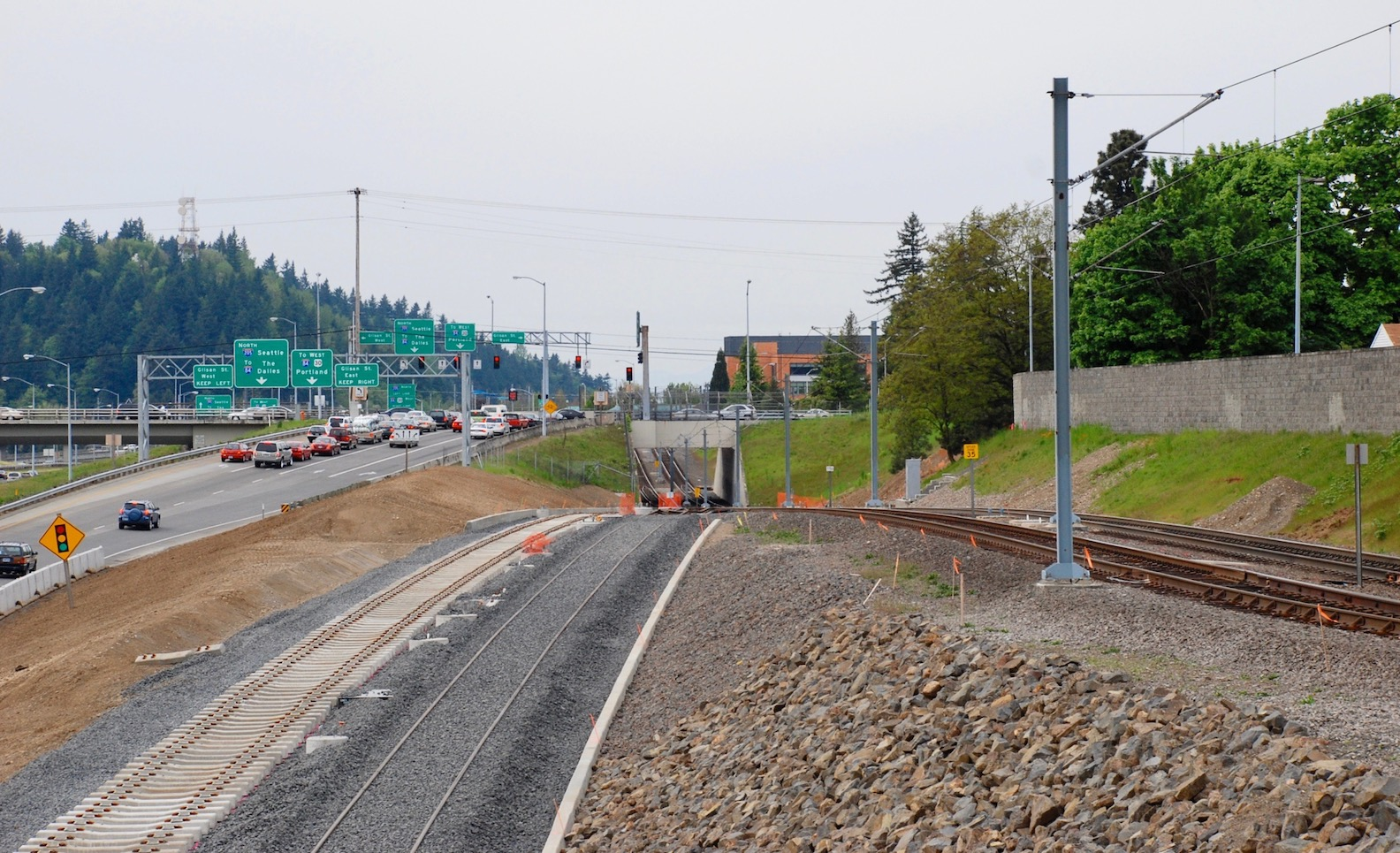
Construction under way along I-205 north of Burnside Street in 2008, with the Eastside MAX tracks on the right

In May 2001, JPACT revisited its plans for the I-205 and McLoughlin Boulevard corridors and the following month announced the $8.8 million South Corridor Transportation Study. By 2003, the study had narrowed down five transit alternatives including building both light rail lines, a combination of one light rail service and one improved bus service, bus rapid transit, and dedicated bus lanes. JPACT recommended both light rail options using a two-phased development plan; the I-205 line would be built by 2009, followed by a Portland–Milwaukie line via McLoughlin Boulevard five years later. The existing I-205 busway right-of-way and a potential for no new taxes were two factors that led to the selection of the I-205 corridor for the first phase. With the approval of local residents, affected jurisdictions endorsed the South Corridor Transportation Project. Plans were amended the following October to include adding light rail to the Portland Transit Mall in downtown Portland in the first phase. TriMet published the combined "I-205/Portland Mall" final environmental impact statement in November 2004 and began acquiring land in 2005.

The federal government approved the project on February 7, 2006. The combined project was budgeted at $575.7 million (equivalent to $838 million in 2025 dollars), of which approximately $355.7 million went to the I-205 segment. TriMet negotiated a local match of 40 percent of total funding, which amounted to $197.4 million (unadjusted). Federal funding covered the remaining 60 percent, or about $345 million, under the New Starts program. The head of the Federal Transit Administration (FTA) signed the full-funding agreement in Portland on July 3, 2007. In May 2009, the project received $32 million in federal stimulus funding from the American Recovery and Reinvestment Act of 2009, an amount already committed to the project by the federal government but made available so that TriMet could retire debt earlier. The City of Portland provided $15 million in bonds paid for by raising parking meter fees, as well as $17 million from a local improvement district and $6.3 million from systems and utilities charges. Around $36 million came from Clackamas County urban renewal funds collected from property taxes within the Clackamas Town Center urban renewal district. TriMet contributed $20.5 million, and the Portland Development Commission provided $20 million. Downtown businesses spent an additional $15.3 million to improve retail spaces along the transit mall.

=== Construction and opening ===
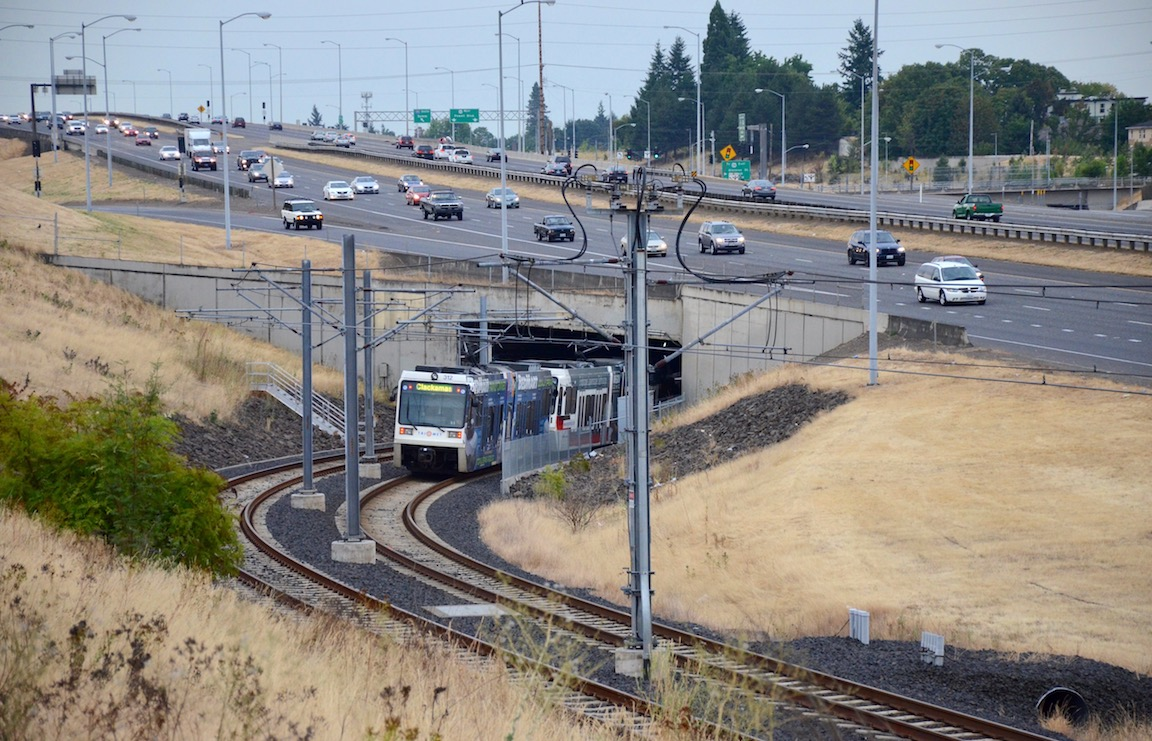
The north portal of the tunnel under I-205, originally built in the early 1980s for the I-205 busway

In February 2004, TriMet awarded the I-205 segment's design–build contract to South Corridor Constructors, a joint venture between Stacy and Witbeck, FE Ward Constructors and Granite Construction Company. Construction began in February 2007. This marked the start of a 2 1/2-year closure of sections of the I-205 Bike Path; a new mixed-use path linking Clackamas County to the South Park Blocks in downtown Portland was paved as a permanent alternative. Preliminary work began in April and involved erecting light rail bridges over Johnson Creek Boulevard and Harold Street and excavating light rail underpasses below Stark and Washington streets. Crews were at work within Clackamas County by November. The line was over 70 percent complete by November 2008, with tracks laid from Gateway Transit Center to Flavel Street. To serve the expansion, TriMet ordered 22 Siemens S70 cars, which it referred to as "Type 4". Siemens delivered the first car in 2009; it made its first test run that March and entered service on August 6. The I-205 extension's first end-to-end test run, attended by local and state dignitaries, occurred that July.

The I-205 segment opened on September 12, 2009. TriMet created a new MAX service for the extension called the "Green Line", which initially ran from Clackamas Town Center Transit Center to the PSU Urban Center stations, but was later extended to the PSU South stations when those stations were infilled in September 2012. The I-205 segment added 6.5 miles (10.5 km) to the MAX system. Opening day festivities, paid for by sponsors and donations, were held at Clackamas Town Center and PSU, and as many as 40,000 people showed up to ride the trains, which were free that day. To address its $31 million budget deficit caused by the slow growth of payroll tax revenue amid the Great Recession, TriMet simultaneously eliminated four bus lines and implemented service cuts to 49 other routes.

== Portland Mall reconstruction ==
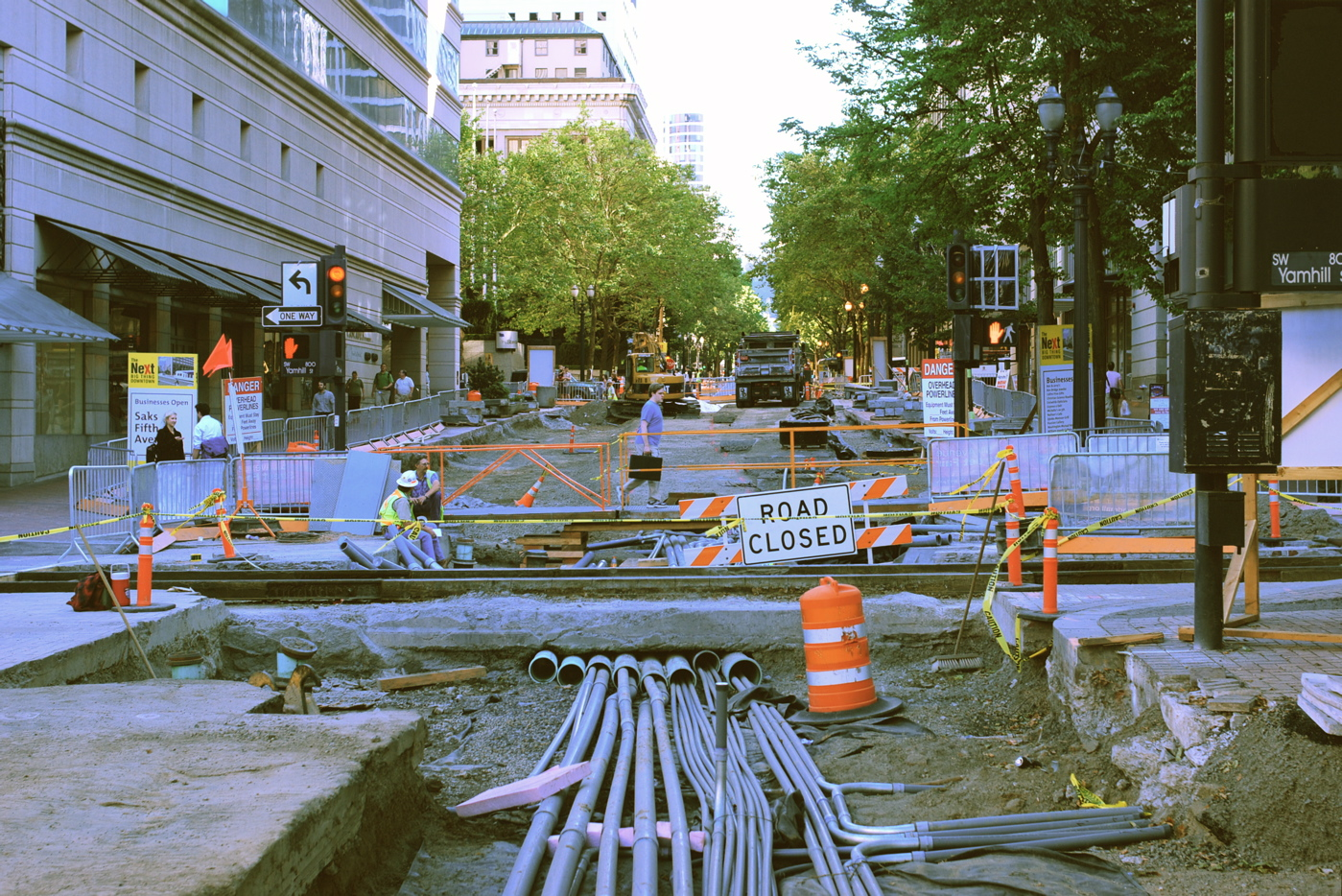
Construction along downtown Portland's 5th Avenue in July 2007, facing south from Yamhill Street

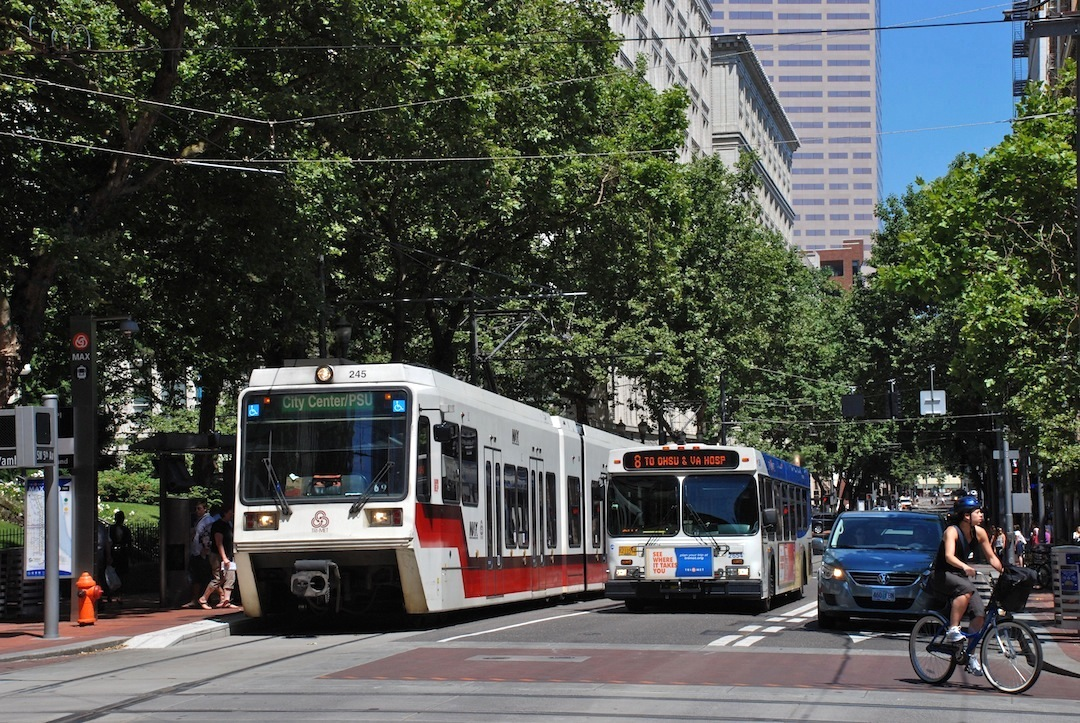
A Green Line train alongside other modes on the Portland Transit Mall in 2011

A north–south rail alignment through downtown Portland had been considered as early as the 1980s. In 1991, the Portland City Council commissioned a feasibility study for a potential subway line beneath the Portland Transit Mall on 5th and 6th avenues, then served only by buses, following recommendations made by a citizen advisory committee. While planning for the South/North project in 1994, planners introduced a surface light rail alternative, which the project's steering committee later favored when they concluded that a $250 million tunnel would be too costly. Following the South/North project's cancellation, the city held off revitalization efforts for the transit mall amid proposals from local businesses to rebuild it to allow curbside parking.

In 2003, TriMet planners reconsidered adding light rail to the Portland Transit Mall after planning for the second phase of the South Corridor Transportation Study, or the Portland–Milwaukie line, revealed that a fourth service on the existing tracks in downtown's Morrison and Yamhill streets—already served by the Blue, Red, and upcoming Yellow lines—would exceed that segment's capacity. Portland business leaders likewise argued for the construction of a new bridge leading to the southern end of the transit mall instead of using the Hawthorne Bridge due to fears that the latter would create a traffic bottleneck. TriMet conducted a study proposing stations on either the left, right, or middle lanes of the transit mall and ultimately selected a hybrid center-lane travel with right-side boarding option in April 2004. A transit mall revitalization plan was approved and combined with the first-phase construction of the I-205 segment a month later. Consisting of seven stations per split on 5th and 6th avenues, the project extended the existing transit mall from 44 to 117 block faces from Union Station to PSU. It also added a continuous travel lane for private vehicles, which had not been present in the corridor's original bus-only design.

TriMet awarded the Portland Mall reconstruction project to Stacy and Witbeck and Kiewit Pacific. Preparation work began with 17 bus lines rerouted to 3rd and 4th avenues, six lines to Columbia and Jefferson streets, and one line, 14–Hawthorne, to 2nd Avenue. Construction commenced on January 14, 2007, with the corridor's temporary closure. Owing to techniques learned from the Interstate MAX project, businesses were kept open while sections, from north to south, were closed off in three- to four-block increments. The original transit mall had been built with mortar-set bricks, which proved difficult to maintain; for the reconstruction, TriMet experimented with sand-set brick paving as recommended by British civil engineer John Knapton, who had studied Roman road building methods. Tracks were laid 25 inches (64 cm) into the surface street while water pipes and sewers were buried 6 feet (1.8 m) to 25 feet (7.6 m) underground. Crews installed the last section of rail in May 2008. Then from June through August, workers closed the upper deck of the Steel Bridge to connect the existing Eastside MAX tracks with the new transit mall tracks.

5th and 6th avenues opened to vehicular traffic in July 2008. TriMet began line testing in January 2009, initially with light rail cars hauled by a truck, then with its new Type 4 MAX trains. Bus service returned to the transit mall on May 24. On August 30, the 1.8-mile-long (2.9 km) Portland Mall light rail segment opened with inaugural service from the Yellow Line, which TriMet rerouted from First Avenue and Morrison and Yamhill streets. Green Line trains began serving the segment on September 12. Light rail service on the transit mall initially ran only between Union Station and the PSU Urban Center stations while nearby building projects delayed the construction of the PSU South stations, which finally opened in September 2012.

== Planned Southwest Corridor extension ==
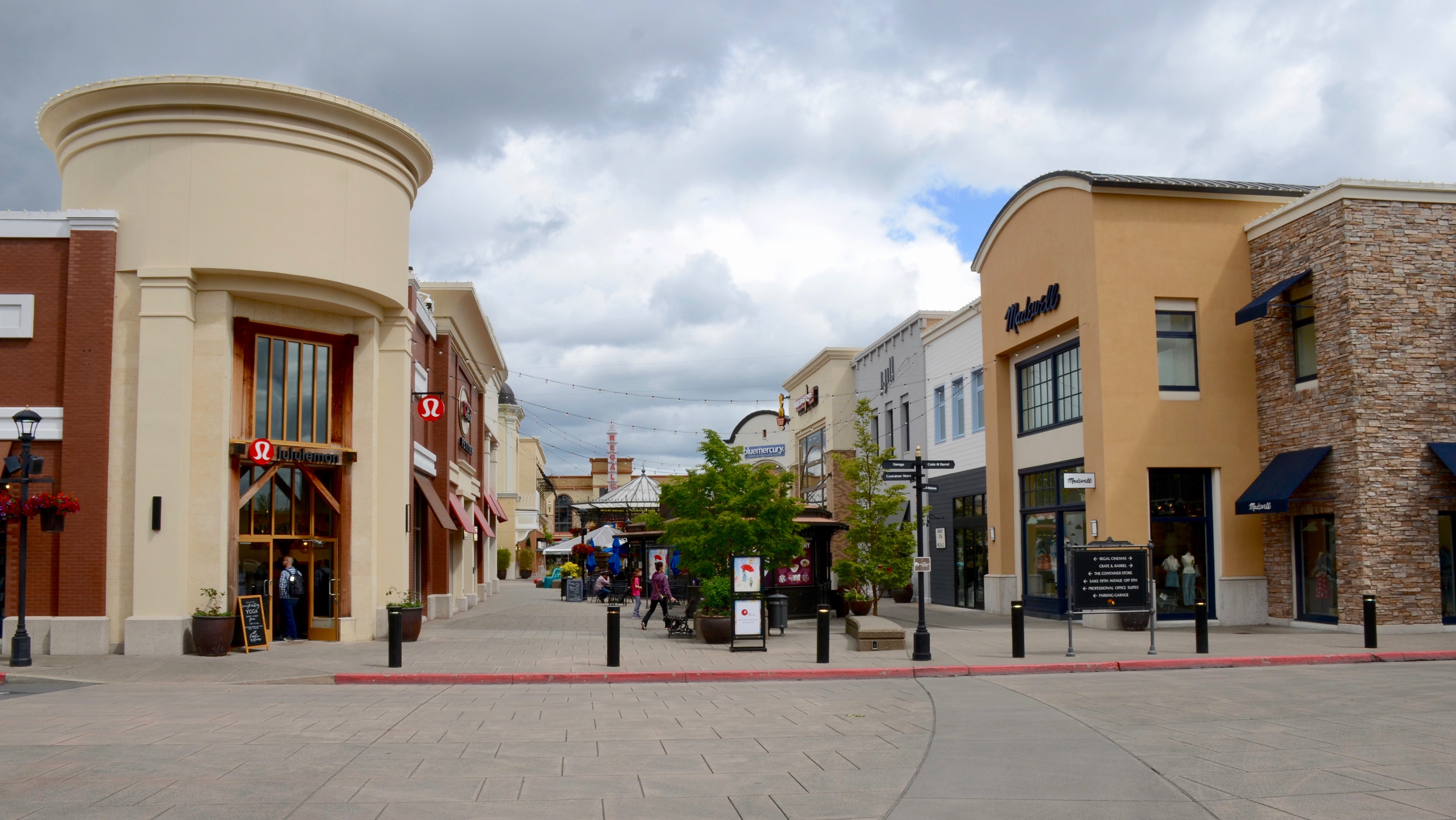
Bridgeport Village in Tualatin, seen in 2019

The Southwest Corridor Light Rail Project was a planned 13-station, 11-mile (18 km) MAX extension that would have connected downtown Portland to Southwest Portland, Tigard, and Tualatin. It would have originated at the PSU South stations in downtown Portland and traveled southwest via Southwest Barbur Boulevard, a part of Oregon Route 99W (OR 99W), until Barbur Transit Center. From there, MAX would have run adjacent to I-5, except in Tigard where it would have run parallel to a segment of Portland and Western Railroad tracks utilized by WES Commuter Rail. A terminus would have been situated within Bridgeport Village in Tualatin. The extension would have connected riders to the Marquam Hill campus of Oregon Health & Science University (OHSU) with an inclined elevator and to Portland Community College (PCC) Sylvania with a shuttle bus. A new Hall Boulevard station would have connected with WES via Tigard Transit Center and would have served as the site of a new operations and maintenance facility.

Metro adopted its 2035 RTP in June 2010 where it identified a segment of OR 99W between Portland and Sherwood as the region's next highest-priority "high-capacity transit" corridor. In January 2011, The FTA granted Metro $2 million to begin studying this formally named "Southwest Corridor". The funds focused on the assessment of various mode alternatives, including light rail, commuter rail, streetcar, and bus rapid transit. The Southwest Corridor Plan officially launched later on September 28, formalizing the development of a unified transportation plan between the involved communities and jurisdictions. In June 2013, the project steering committee selected light rail and bus rapid transit as the alternatives for further consideration. Citing a lack of present and future demand, the steering committee eliminated further planning using the alternatives to Sherwood. They also rerouted the proposed alignment in Tigard through the Tigard Triangle in response to local opposition to the removal of auto lanes from OR 99W.

In June 2014, the steering committee determined a refined route for further study that ran from the southern end of the Portland Transit Mall in downtown Portland to just east of Tualatin station in downtown Tualatin; this route was later shortened to terminate at Bridgeport Village. The following year, proposals to serve Marquam Hill and Hillsdale with tunnels were dropped from the plan because they would be too costly, have severe construction impacts, and attract few new transit riders. In May 2016, the steering committee voted to select light rail as the preferred mode alternative over bus rapid transit. They also removed a tunnel to PCC Sylvania from further consideration. After passing a measure requiring voters to approve the construction of any high-capacity transit built within city limits, Tigard voters approved the light rail extension the following September.

At an estimated cost of $2.6 billion to $2.9 billion, the project was included in a regional transportation funding measure called "Get Moving 2020". In light of a budget gap of $462 million, planners proposed reducing lanes on Barbur Boulevard and shortening the line's route to terminate in downtown Tigard. Both proposals were rejected in November 2019. Private negotiations, as well as Metro's approval to increase the project's requested budget by $125 million in the 2020 ballot measure, reduced the budget gap to around $100 million. On November 3, 2020, voters rejected the measure. Had it been approved, the extension would have begun construction in 2022 and opened by 2027. It had been expected to serve approximately 37,500 riders by 2035.

== Service reductions ==
On April 22, 2026, the TriMet Board of Directors approved a proposal to eliminate Green Line service between PSU South station and Gateway Transit Center, retaining service only along the I-205 section, between Gateway Transit Center and Clackamas Town Center Transit Center. The plan, which is part of a larger service adjustment that includes changes to 34 bus routes, is expected to save TriMet $26 million amid an ongoing budget deficit. The service change began on August 23, 2026.

== Route ==
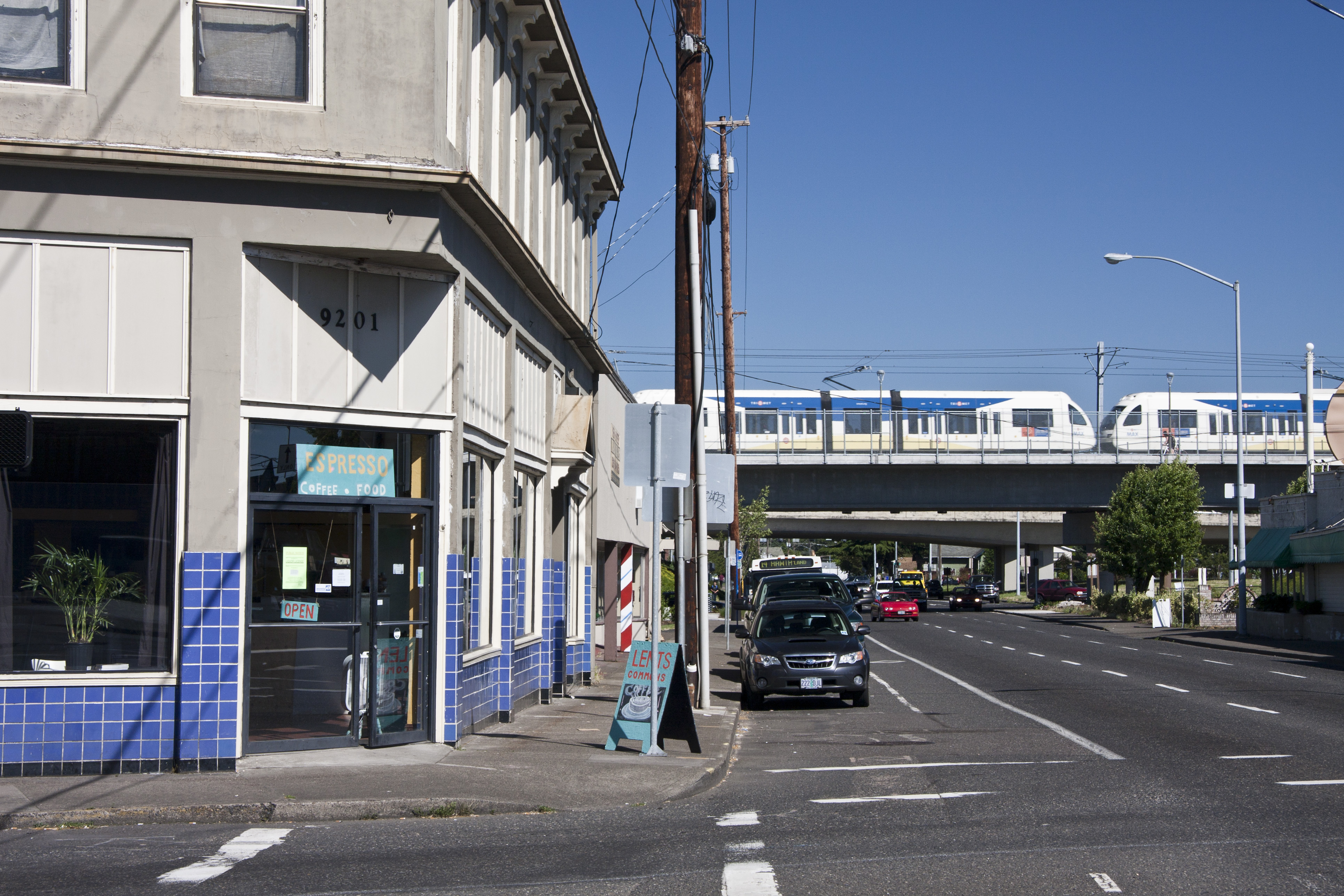
A Green Line train seen crossing over Foster Road in 2010

The Green Line is 6.5 miles (10.5 km) long and serves the I-205 MAX Light Rail. Its northern termini is at the Gateway/Northeast 99th Avenue Transit Center situated at Northeast 99th Avenue and Northeast Pacific Street. Green Line trains must use the center track to terminate.

After Gateway Transit Center, the Green Line proceeds south, entering the I-205 MAX extension just east of I-205. Throughout most of this stretch, the line is grade-separated as part of the I-205 busway, running either above or below roadway intersections. The exception is an at-grade crossing at Southeast Flavel Street. Much of this segment also parallels the I-205 Bike Path. Between Southeast Lincoln and Grant streets, the tracks enter a tunnel beneath the freeway, exiting on the opposite side just north of Southeast Division Street. Above Johnson Creek Boulevard, it travels on a 1,400-foot-long (430 m) overpass, the extension's longest elevated structure. South of Southeast Fuller Road station, the line dips under the Otty Road and Monterey Avenue overpasses before terminating at Clackamas Town Center Transit Center near Southeast Sunnyside Road.

The Green Line also formally shared the northbound segment of the Portland Transit Mall with the Yellow Line, which diverges for Expo Center station in North Portland after crossing the Steel Bridge. It shares the southbound segment with the Orange Line, which continues beyond PSU South/Southwest 5th and Jackson station for Southeast Park Avenue station near Milwaukie. The Green Line also shared a portion of the Eastside MAX with Blue and Red lines between Rose Quarter Transit Center and Gateway Transit Center.

A geographic map of the MAX Green Line (in red) relative to the rest of the network (in black) with icons marking the line's termini. (Note: The official system schematic can be viewed on the TriMet website.)

=== Stations ===
List of MAX Green Line stations
Station	Connections	Began service	Location
Gateway/NE 99th Ave Transit Center	Blue Line; Red Line (westbound at Gateway North)	September 12, 2009	Portland
SE Main St		September 12, 2009	Portland
SE Division St	FX2–Division	September 12, 2009	Portland
SE Powell Blvd		September 12, 2009	Portland
SE Holgate Blvd		September 12, 2009	Portland
Lents Town Center/SE Foster Rd		September 12, 2009	Portland
SE Flavel St		September 12, 2009	Portland
SE Fuller Rd		September 12, 2009	Clackamas
Clackamas Town Center Transit Center		September 12, 2009	Clackamas

Images of MAX Green Line stations
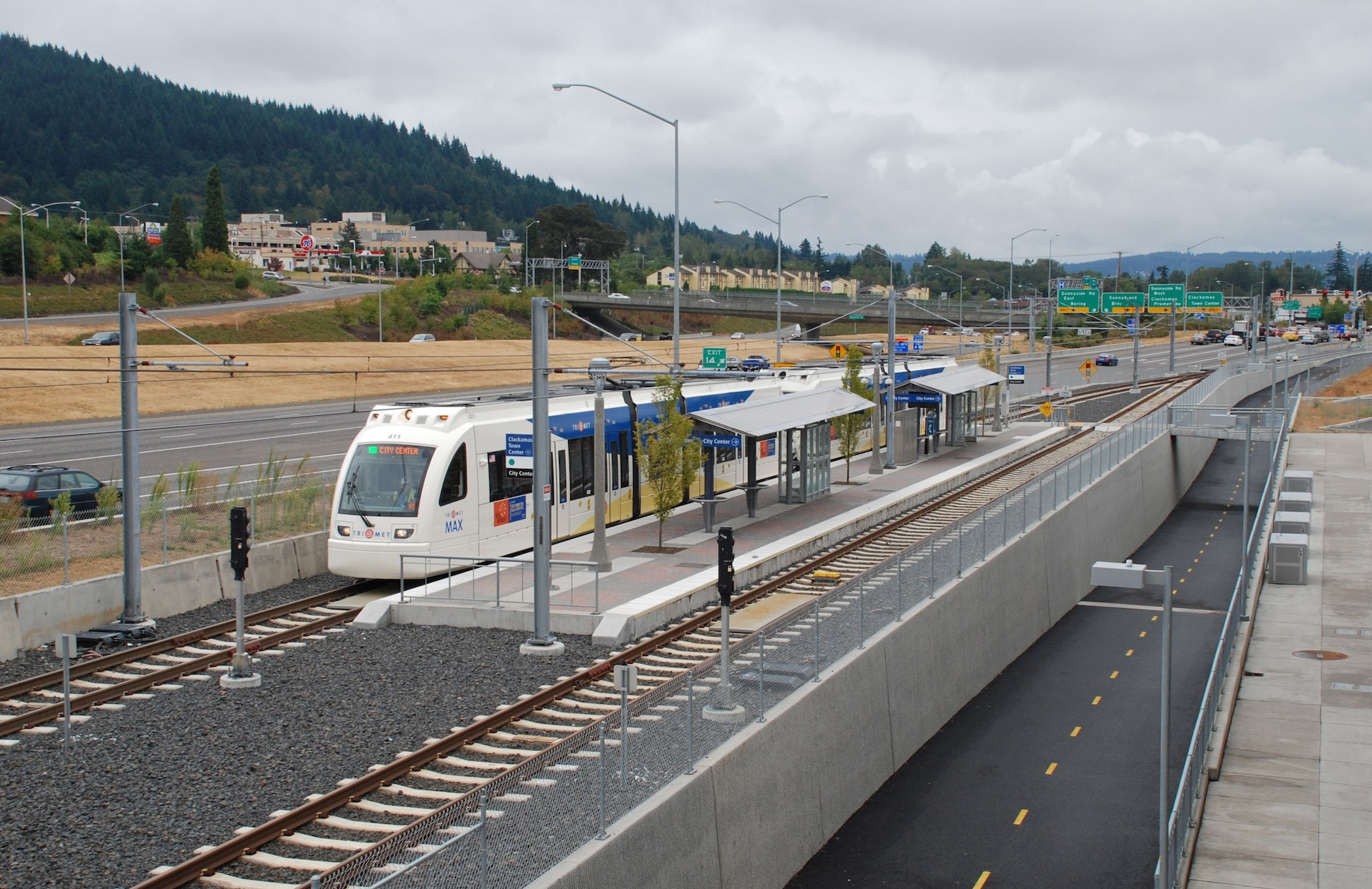
Clackamas Town Center Transit Center, the Green Line's southern terminus

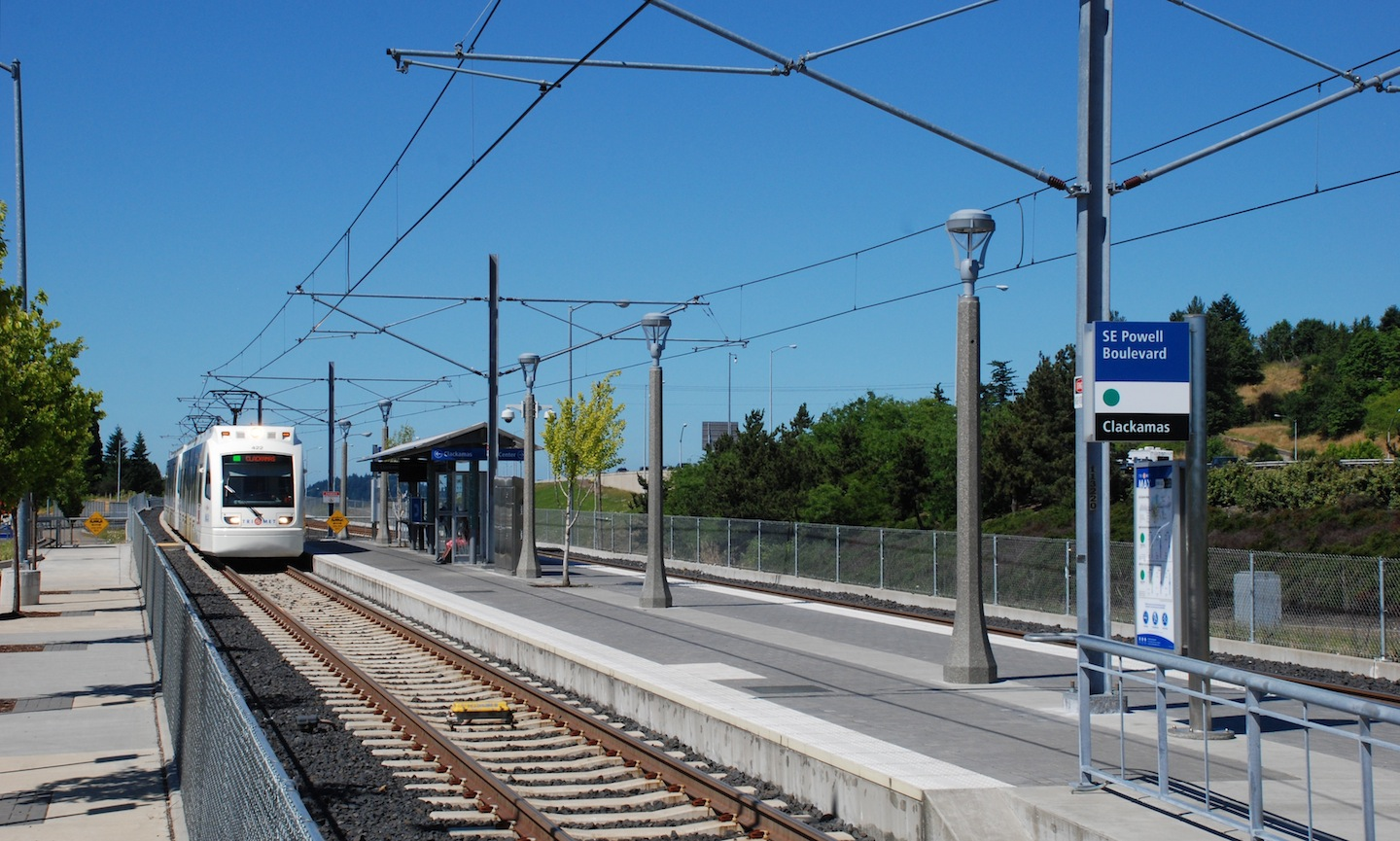
SE Powell Boulevard station

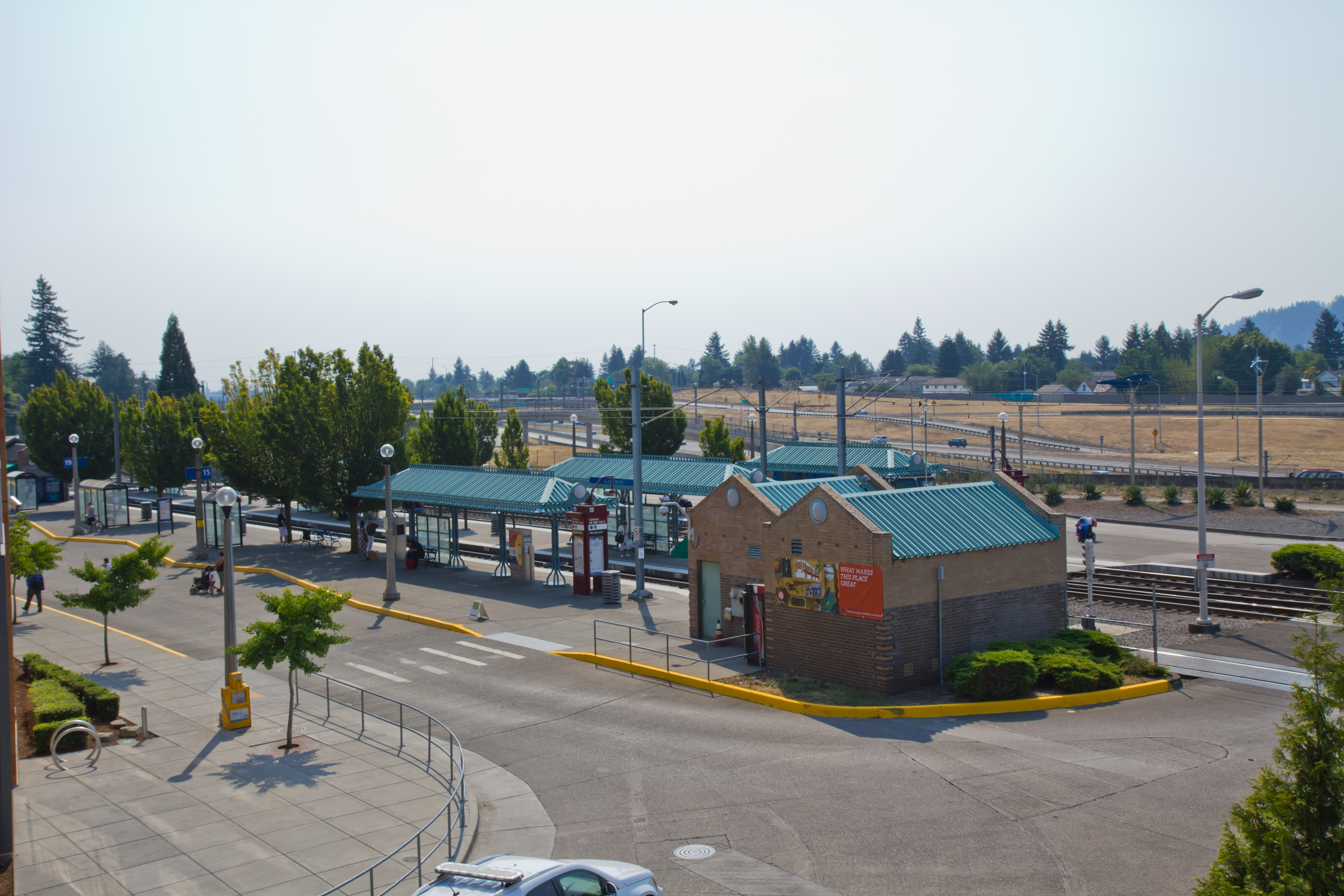
Gateway Transit Center

== Service ==
TriMet designates the Green Line as a "Frequent Service" route, which means that service runs every 15 minutes during most of the day. Frequency is reduced to 30 minutes during early and late off-peak hours. Trains operate on weekdays from 4:16 am to 1:06 am the next day and on weekends from 5:42 am to 1:03 am. End-to-end travel from Clackamas Town Center Transit Center to Gateway Transit Center takes 19 minutes.

=== Ridership ===
The Green Line averaged 11,202 riders in May 2025, the third busiest in the MAX system. Before the start of construction, a PSU study estimated the Green Line would carry 46,500 riders by 2025. TriMet had projected an average of 25,250 riders on weekdays for the first year, but fewer people than expected actually rode the line on the first weekday service. By the following month, TriMet had recorded approximately 17,000 trips per day. The average daily ridership in June 2010 was 19,500, increasing to 24,300 by April 2012.

In September 2019, the Green Line was the third-busiest MAX service with an average weekday ridership of 19,160, 1,480 fewer riders than the previous year. The drop in ridership—experienced systemwide—is attributed to crime and lower-income riders being forced out of the inner city by rising housing prices.
