= SE Division St station =

Light rail station in Portland, Oregon, U.S.

SE Division Street
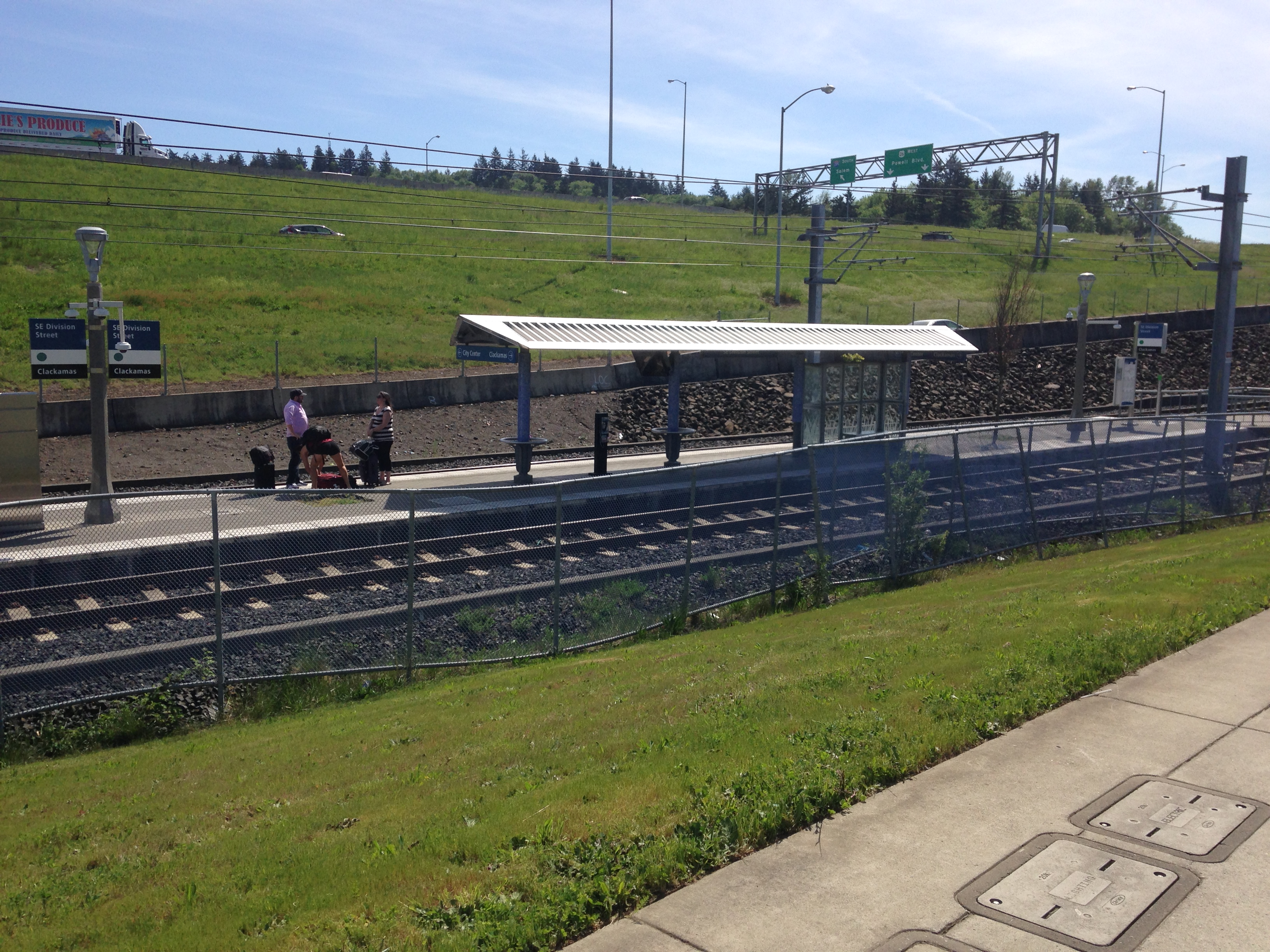
- Southeast Division Street station platform

General information
- Location: 9402 SE Division Street; Portland, Oregon; U.S.
- Coordinates: 45°30′13″N 122°34′00″W
- Owner: TriMet
- Line: Interstate MAX
- Platforms: 1 island platform
- Tracks: 2
- Connections: TriMet: FX2

Construction
- Cycle facilities: Lockers
- Accessible: Yes

History
- Opened: September 12, 2009

Services
Preceding station	TriMet	Following station
SE Main St toward Gateway/Northeast 99th Avenue Transit Center	Green Line	SE Powell Blvd toward Clackamas Town Center Transit Center
Location

Southeast Division Street station is a light rail station on the MAX Green Line in Portland, Oregon. It is the 2nd stop southbound on the I-205 MAX branch.

The station is located at the intersection of Interstate 205 and Division Street, and offers connections to the I-205 Bike Path. It is adjacent to the I-205 exit ramps to Powell Boulevard. This station has a center platform.

== Bus connections ==
This station by the l-205 ramps to Powell Boulevard is served by the following bus line:

- FX2–Division

== Gallery ==
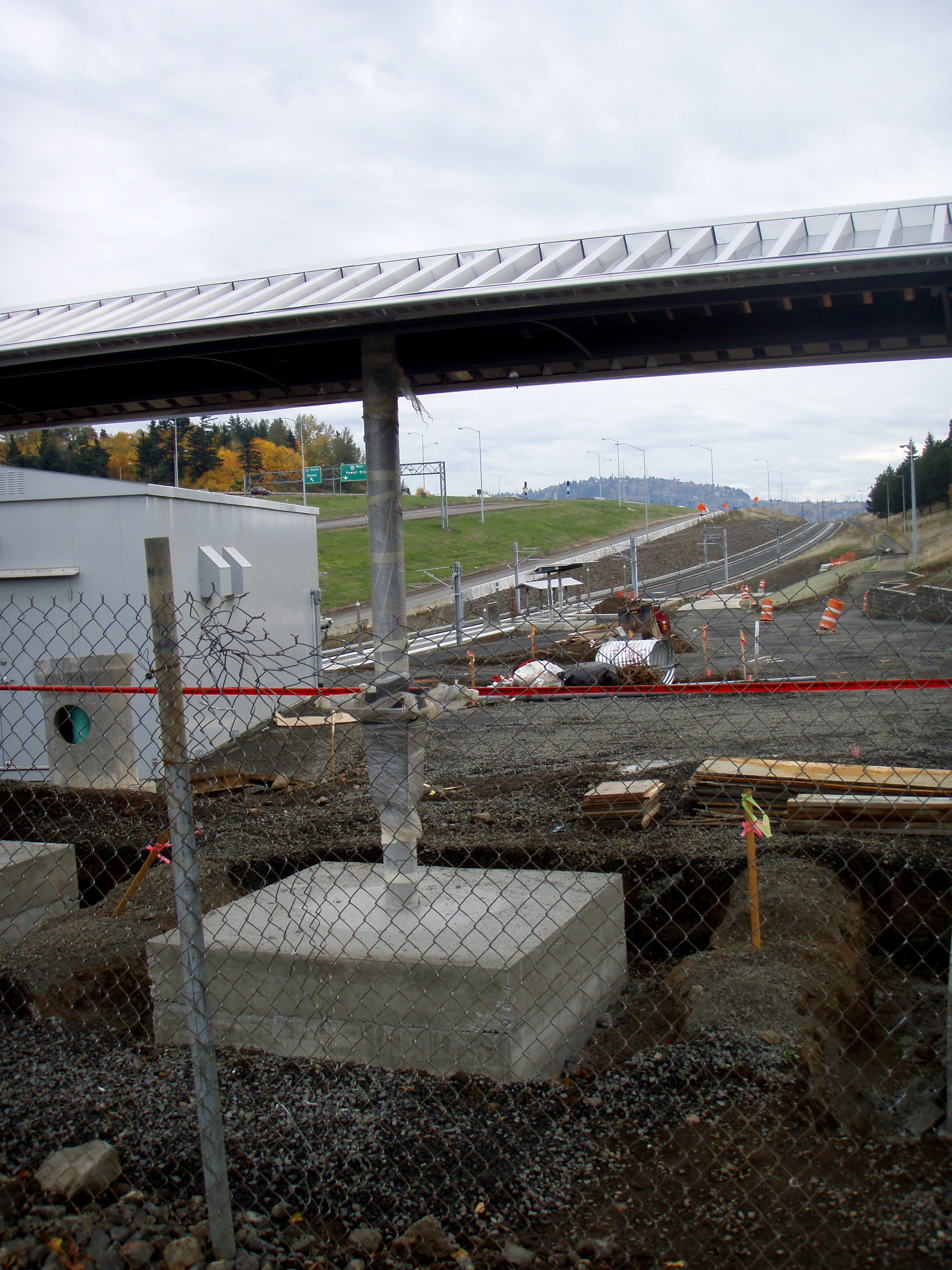
Station under construction in 2009
