= Clackamas Town Center =

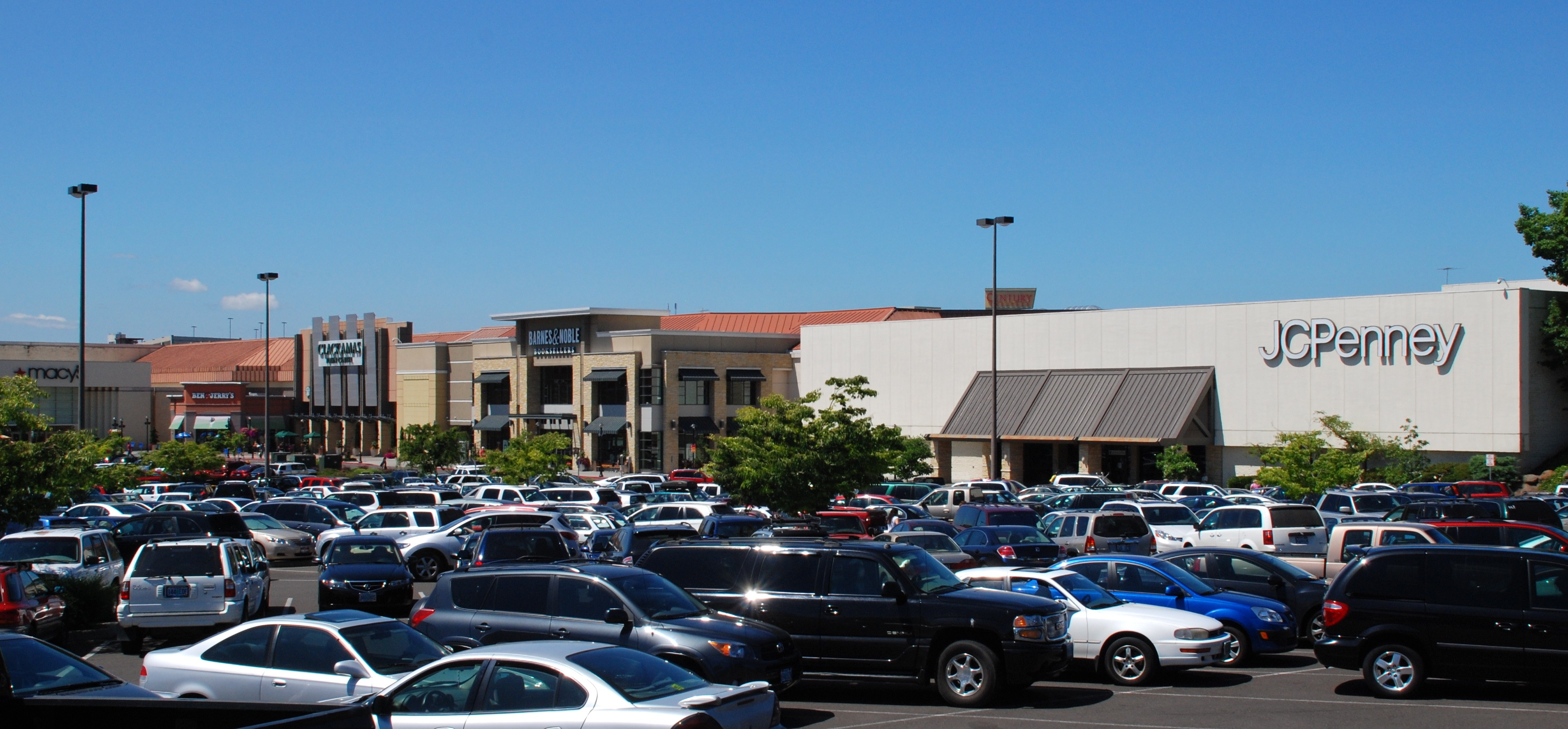
- Location: Clackamas, Oregon, United States
- Coordinates: 45.436°N 122.574°W
- Address: 12000 SE 82nd Avenue (Note: The mall's USPS mailing address is Happy Valley, OR 97086, but it is actually located in the unincorporated Clackamas area, not in Happy Valley.)
- Opened: March 6, 1981; 45 years ago
- Developer: The Hahn Co.
- Manager: GGP
- Owner: GGP
- Num. of stores: 170
- Num. of anchor tenants: 5 (4 open, 1 under construction)
- Floor area: 1,412,631 sq ft (131,237.7 m^{2})
- Floors: 2 (6 in Parking Garage, 3rd floor mezzanine in former Nordstrom)
- Parking: 6,800
- Public transit: MAX Light Rail at Clackamas Town Center Transit Center; Bus Service; 29, 30, 31, 33, 34, 71, 72, 79, 152, 155, 156
- Website: www.clackamastowncenter.com

Clackamas Town Center is a shopping mall established in 1981 in the Portland, Oregon, metropolitan area, located on unincorporated land in the Clackamas area of Clackamas County, in the U.S. state of Oregon. It is managed and co-owned by Brookfield Properties through its GGP subsidiary, and is currently anchored by JCPenney, Dick's Sporting Goods, Macy's and a separate Macy's Home/Backstage store. It also includes a 20-screen Century movie theater. There is one anchor tenant current under construction known as Sky Zone that is set to open in 2026.

== Location ==
The mall has a Happy Valley, Oregon, mailing address, but is actually located in an unincorporated area. However, the city of Happy Valley was interested in annexing the area that includes the mall. The nearby city of Milwaukie was also interested in annexing the area. In December 2012, mediation between officials of the two cities resulted in a draft agreement under which the mall and other land west of Interstate 205 would eventually be annexed by Milwaukie.

== History ==
=== Construction and early years ===
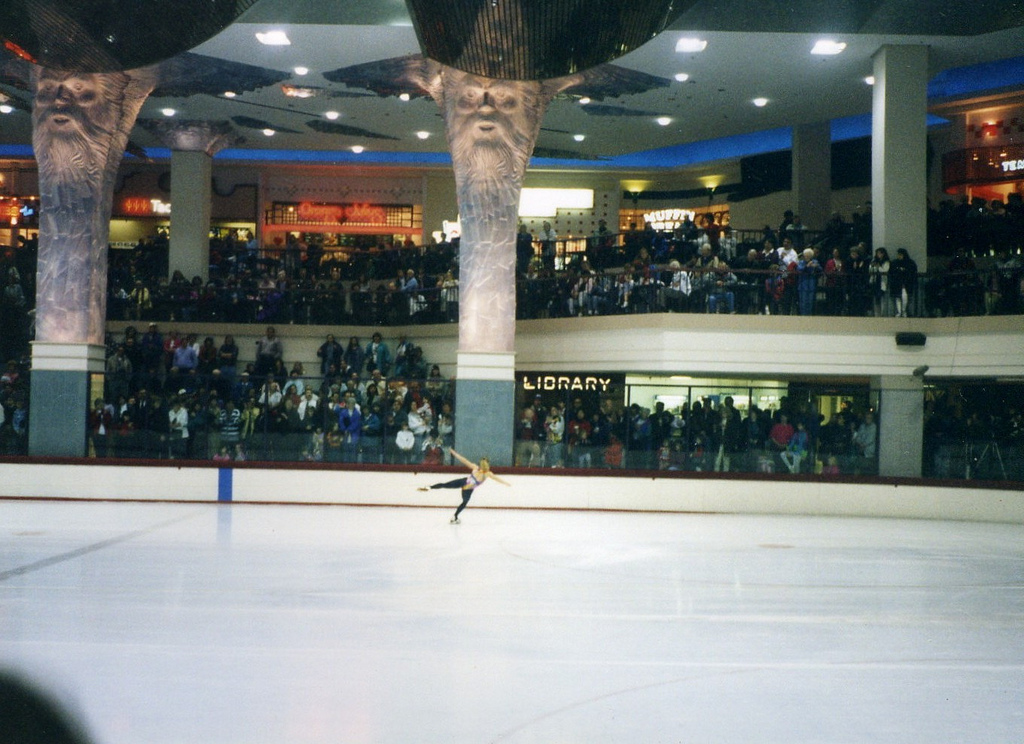
Tonya Harding skating in the mall Ice Chalet, 1994; the ice rink was removed in late 2007 during renovations

The two-level enclosed mall, with 1,218,000 square feet (113,200 m^{2}) of retail space officially opened on March 6, 1981, built by Ernest W. Hahn, Inc. and designed by Seattle architects John Graham & Company. Prior to the mall's opening, the attached Meier & Frank store opened in October 1980. Original anchors included JCPenney, Meier & Frank, Nordstrom, Sears and Montgomery Ward. There was also an ice rink; a five-screen movie theater; and a branch of the Clackamas County Library. Also featured were three large cedar sculptures carved by artist and woodsman, Dudley C. Carter, which were commissioned by the center in 1979, when Carter was eighty-eight.

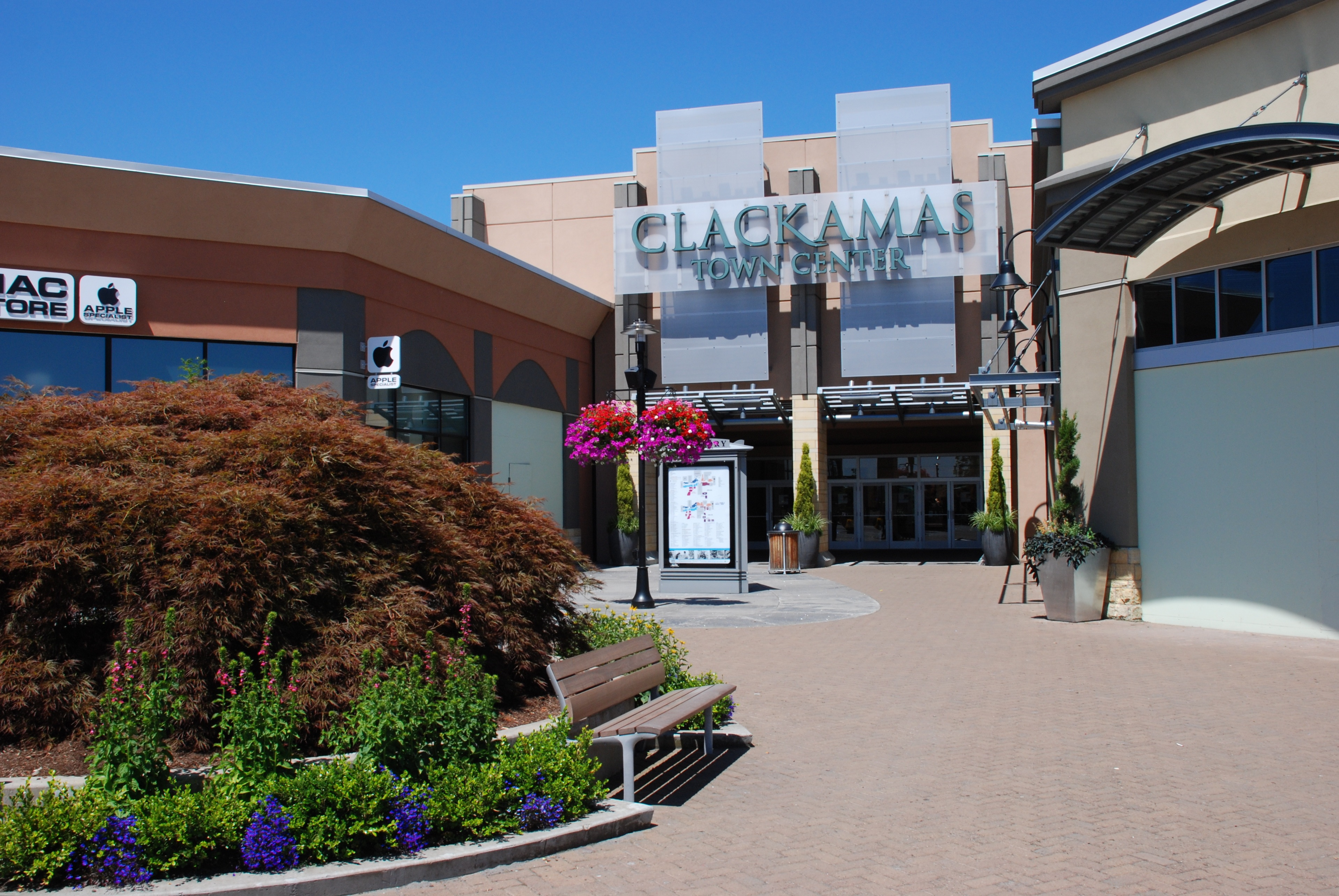
South entrance in 2011

TriMet diverted or extended its bus service into the new mall, constructing a new transit center in the parking area on the mall's north side, which opened in November 1981 and by 1985 was being used by six bus routes. In the 1990s, Olympic skater Tonya Harding frequently practiced on the ice rink.

The mall remained largely unchanged until Montgomery Ward went bankrupt and closed its store in 2001. Meier & Frank acquired the former Ward building and opened a home store in 2002 in the upper level, while leasing out the lower level to Copeland Sports. The ice rink closed in 2003, the original movie theater closed in 2005, and Copeland in turn closed in 2006. Macy's reclaimed the former Copeland's space and expanded the home store into that space.

=== 2007 renovations and expansion ===
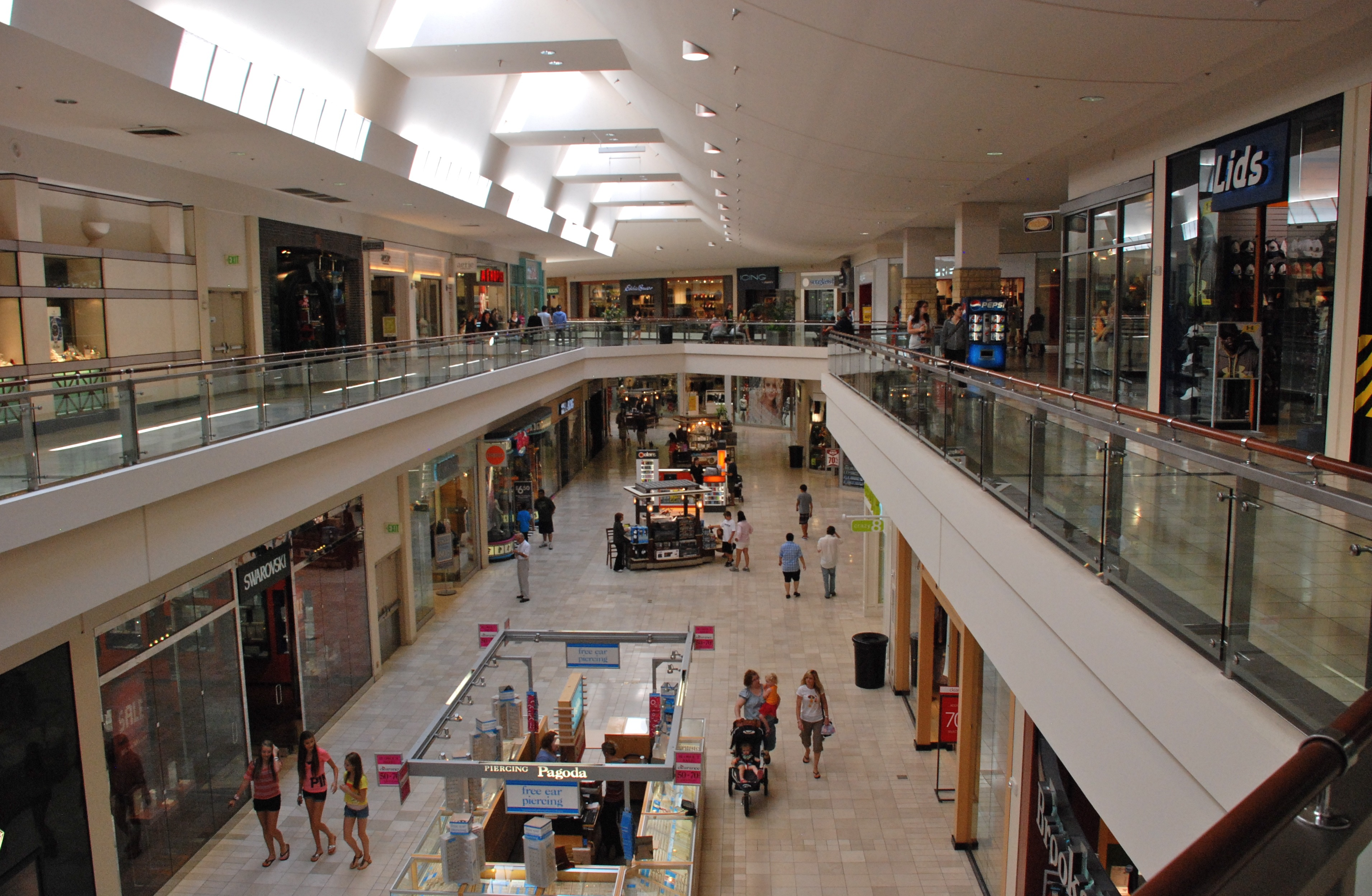
Interior view in 2011

General Growth Properties acquired a 50% interest in the property in 2002 and assumed management. A major redevelopment began in 2005 to add 250,000 sq ft (23,000 m^{2}) to the center. As part of the construction the area formerly occupied by the ice rink was gutted, and the Carter sculptures were removed. Designed by architectural firm DLR Group, the renovation and expansion added approximately 40 new stores and restaurants, many in a new lifestyle center on the south side, and a new 75,000 sq ft (7,000 m^{2}), 20-screen Century multiplex theater. The renovation also put in tranquility ponds, new flooring, lighting, furniture, escalators, elevators, handrails, and exterior upgrades. It was completed in late 2007. The new, larger movie theater opened in December 2007.

In September 2009, a new MAX Light Rail station opened at the mall, with the opening of the Green Line. The Clackamas Town Center Transit Center station is the southern terminus of the Green Line and is located on the east side of the mall's parking area. It is also served by several bus lines and it replaced the original transit center, which had closed in 2006 and temporarily been replaced by simple bus stops pending construction of the new facility.

=== 2012 shooting ===
A shooting occurred on December 11, 2012, which left three people, including the gunman, dead, and one person seriously wounded. At approximately 3:28 p.m. PST., 22-year-old Jacob Tyler Roberts opened fire near Macy's at the upper level of the mall with an AR-15 rifle. Roberts was wearing a hockey mask and was heard by witnesses shouting out "I am the shooter!" while he fired shots. A 45-year-old man and a 54-year-old woman were killed, and Roberts died from a self-inflicted gunshot wound to the head. A fifteen-year-old girl suffered gunshot wounds to the chest and was hospitalized at Oregon Health & Science University Hospital in serious, stable condition. A total of 17 rounds were fired from Roberts' rifle, and there were about 10,000 shoppers present at the mall at the time of the attack. The manager of Justice was a pregnant woman who secured shoppers in their backroom as they hid from the shooter. As a result of the stress & trauma, she was hospitalized and put on life support. They were able to save her baby, but the woman died. Two people died in addition to the gunman.

=== 2018 Sears closure and 2020 opening of Dick's Sporting Goods ===
In 2015, Sears Holdings spun off 235 of its properties, including the Sears at Clackamas Town Center, into Seritage Growth Properties.

On August 22, 2018, Sears announced that its store would be closing as part of a plan to close 46 stores nationwide. The store closed in November 2018.

In early 2020, remodeling of the former Sears space began to replace the site with a Dick's Sporting Goods location. The Dick's Sporting Goods held its grand opening in the former Sears space on October 10, 2020.

=== 2020 closure of Nordstrom and new anchor store ===
On May 7, 2020, it was announced that Nordstrom would also be closing as part of a plan to close 16 stores nationwide. The store closed in June 2020. It had already been closed temporarily since March 2020, due to the COVID-19 pandemic. In 2024, Sky Zone, a trampoline park announced that they were opening a trampoline park in the former Nordstrom in 2026 as part of their massive expansion of new locations across the United States. The new trampoline park is currently under construction.

== See also ==
- List of shopping malls in Oregon
