= Clackamas Town Center Transit Center =

Transit station in Oregon, United States

Clackamas Town Center TC
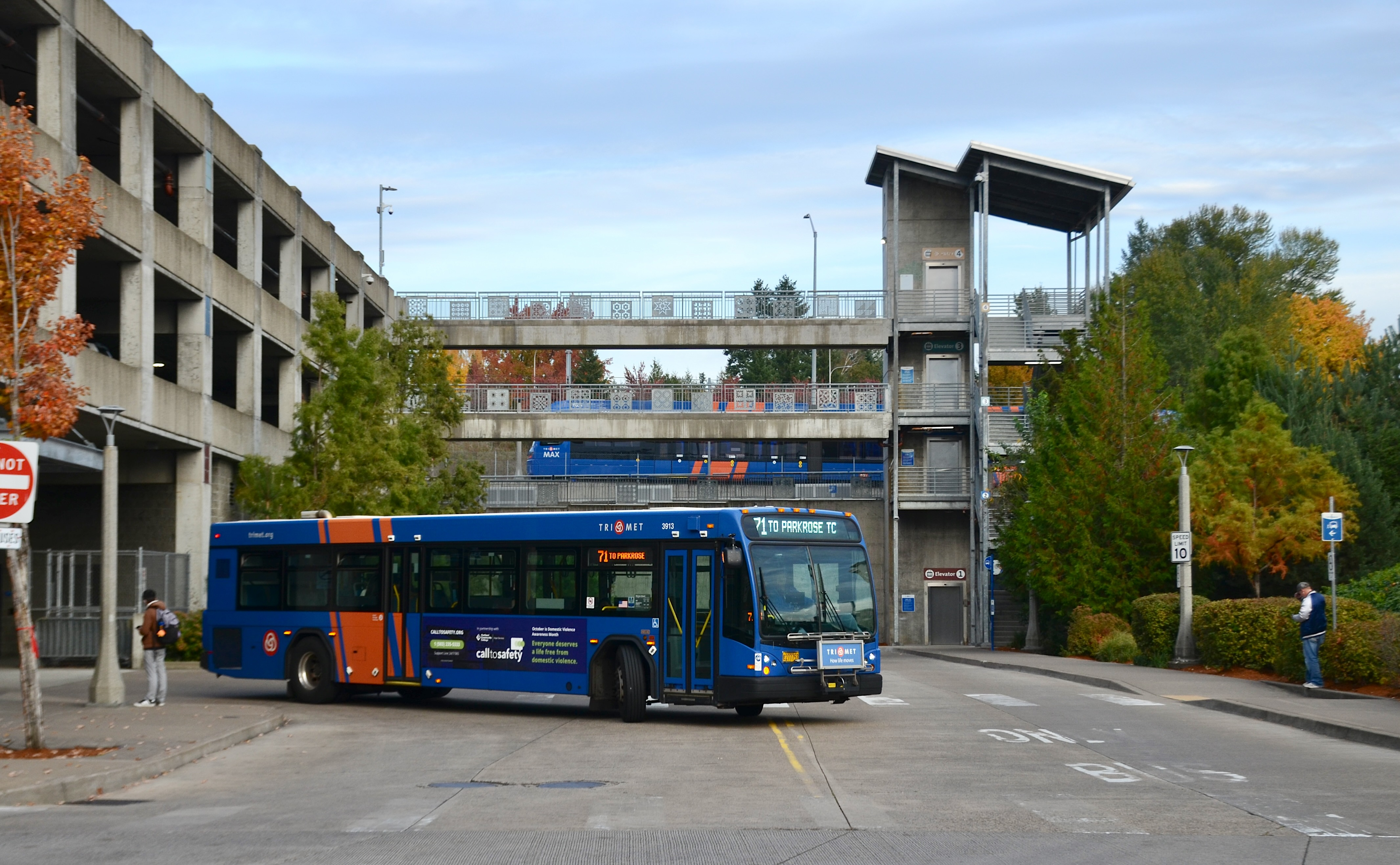
- A bus departing the transit center, with the MAX station in the background

General information
- Location: 9225 SE Sunnyside Road, Happy Valley, Oregon, United States
- Coordinates: 45°26′08″N 122°34′04″W
- Owner: TriMet
- Platforms: 1 island platform
- Tracks: 2
- Bus routes: TriMet: 29, 30, 31, 33, 40, 71, 72, 79, 155, 156
- Bus operators: TriMet

Construction
- Parking: 750 spaces
- Cycle facilities: Racks and 8 lockers
- Accessible: yes

History
- Opened: September 12, 2009

Services
Preceding station	TriMet	Following station
SE Fuller Rd toward Gateway/NE 99th Ave Transit Center	Green Line	Terminus
Location

The Clackamas Town Center Transit Center is a bus transit center and MAX Light Rail station, located in Clackamas County, Oregon, in the southeastern part of the Portland metropolitan area. Clackamas Town Center TC is the southern terminus of the MAX Green Line, which began service in 2009.

Owned by regional transit agency TriMet, the current transit center opened in 2009 and is located east of the Clackamas Town Center mall, adjacent to Interstate 205. Clackamas Town Center has hosted a bus transit center since 1981, with the original transit center located on the north side of the mall.

== History ==
=== Original location ===
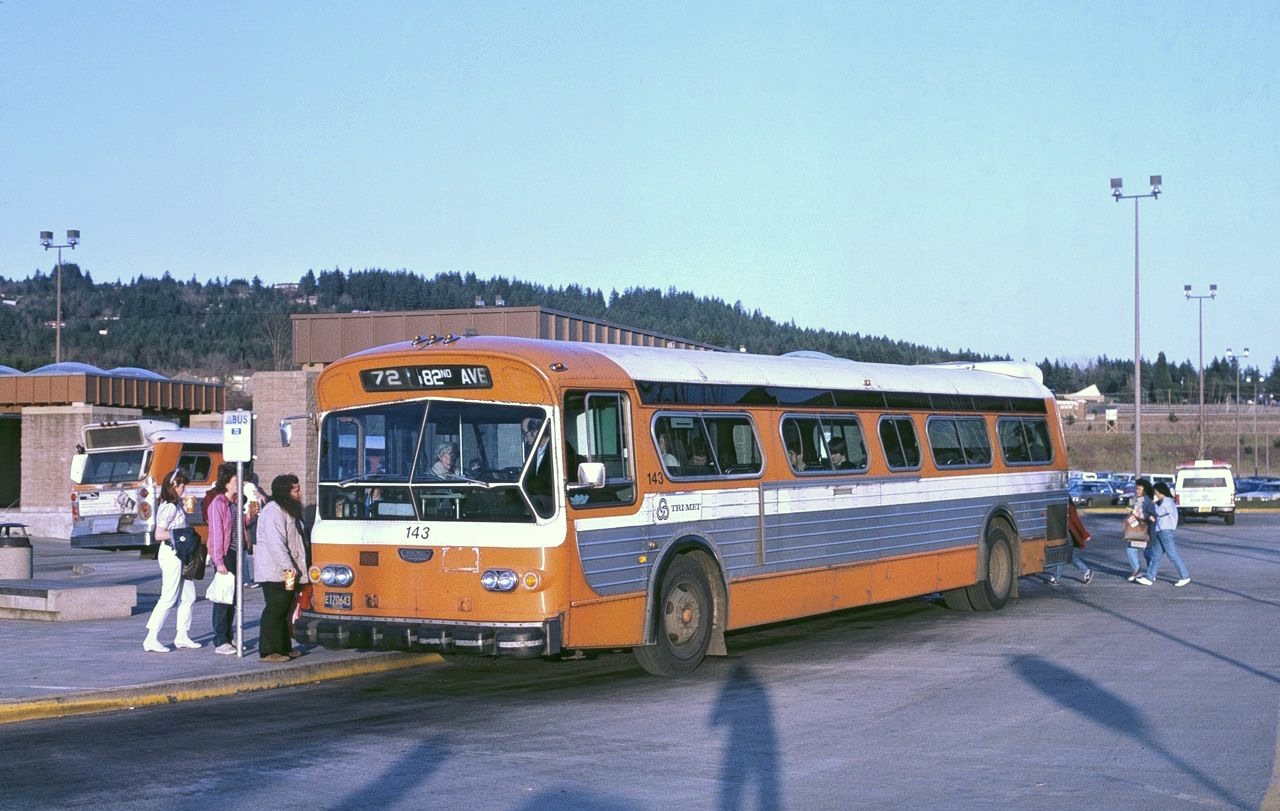
Buses at the first location in 1985

The first Clackamas Town Center Transit Center opened in 1981 and was located on the north side of the shopping mall, next to the movie theater and Meier & Frank store. Buses began serving the site of the transit center (TC) on June 14, 1981, but construction of the TC's passenger facilities was still under way at that time. An island with a large passenger shelter in the middle was constructed, with buses looping clockwise around it and serving stops designated for each route. This was completed in the fall and came into use on November 22, 1981.

The transit center was funded by a combination of a $350,000 grant from the federal Urban Mass Transportation Administration and $50,000 from the mall's owner, the Hahn Company. $90,000 of the UMTA grant was for transit improvements elsewhere at the then-new shopping mall, including a park-and-ride lot to the east of the mall (near where the MAX station was built many years later) and a signalized bus-only exit road onto Sunnyside Road. Only three bus routes served the transit center originally: routes 72-82nd Avenue, 76-King Road and 78-Linwood. Other routes were added later, including 79-Canby in 1982. In 1985, routes 31-Estacada and 71-Killingsworth-60th were diverted or extended to the Clackamas TC, route 78 was renumbered 28, and route 76 was replaced by 29 Lake-Webster and a change in route 31.

=== Closure and temporary location ===
Expansion of the mall required the closure of the original transit center in June 2006, with the TC temporarily moved just to the east of the 1981 site (and moved again in December 2007). By this time, TriMet had given final approval to the extension of the MAX Green Line to Clackamas Town Center and planned to construct a new transit center at the site of the MAX station, which would be next to the I-205 freeway on the east side of the mall.

== Current site and MAX station ==
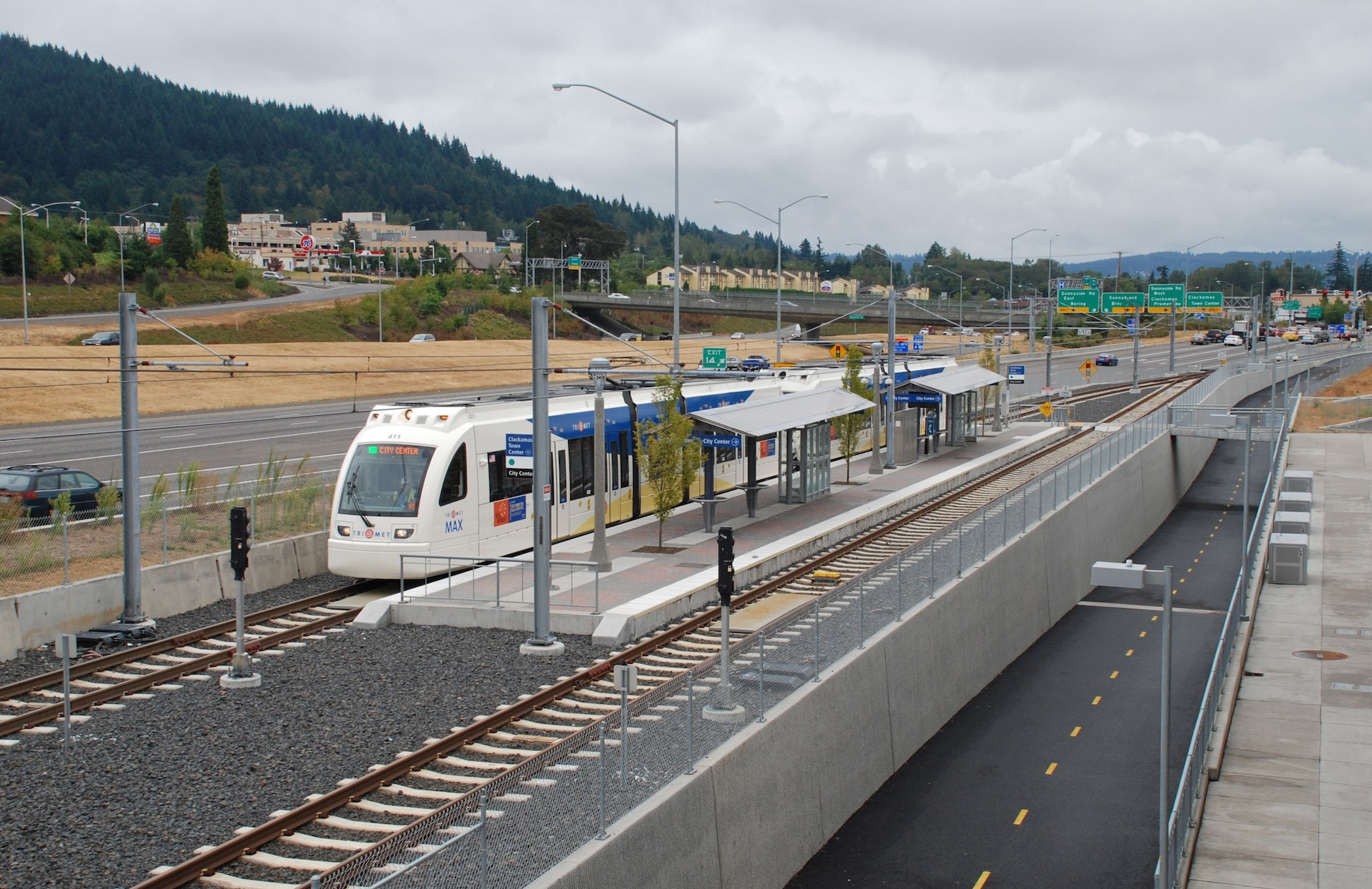
The light rail station in 2010

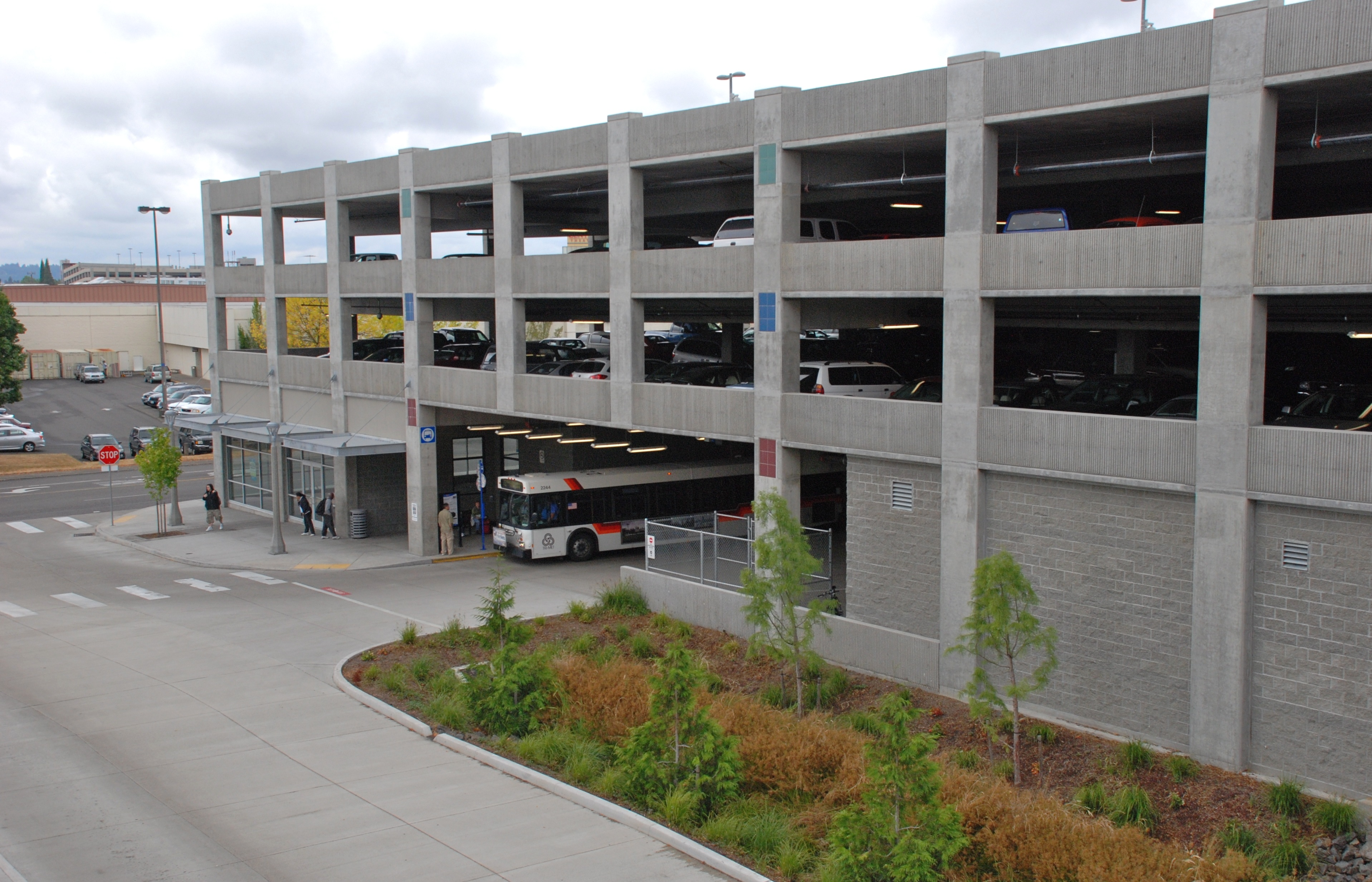
The bus loading area and the parking garage of the 2009-opened TC

The new Clackamas Town Center TC and Green Line MAX station opened on September 12, 2009.

The station features a three-story, 750-space park-and-ride garage, and is served by 10 bus lines. The bus boarding area is located on the first level of the garage, which is connected to the MAX platform by a bridge over the I-205 Bike Path. The MAX station uses an island platform design, with access to the platform provided by a grade crossing over the western track.

=== Artwork ===
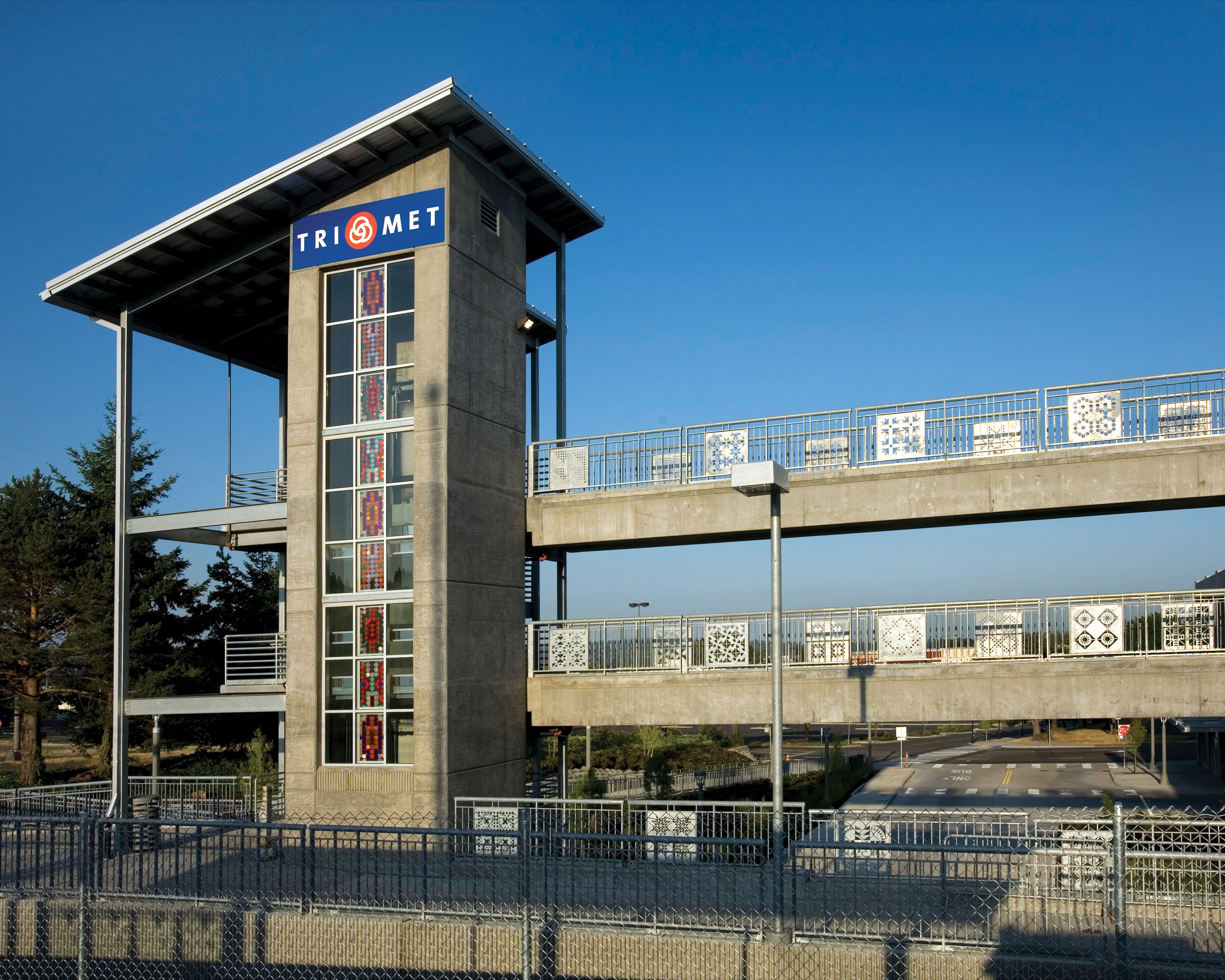
The Chain of Life

Clackamas Town Center Transit Center features multiple works of site-specific art by Ellensburg, Washington–based multimedia artist Richard C. "Dick" Elliott, which are collectively titled The Chain of Life. The first chronological element of The Chain of Life is on the MAX platform, where brick pavers produce patterns from indigenous basketry from the Clackamas area. The second element, Pioneer Quilts, is a series of cut steel panels on the railings of the pedestrian bridge to the platform, invoking the quilt patterns of pioneering Oregon quilters. The final element is Twisted Ribbon, a 28-foot-tall (8.5 m) abstract double helix fabricated from retroreflective road markers.

The Chain of Life is one of the final works by Elliott, who died in November 2008, before the formal opening of the station. Elliott's patterned installation of retroreflective road markers in Twisted Ribbon is representative of his signature style, which was described by biographer Sheila Farr as a "unique, gemlike art medium of radiant color and design."

=== Bus services ===
Along with the MAX Green Line, the transit center is served by the following TriMet bus lines As of August 23, 2026:

- 29 - International Way
- 30 - Estacada
- 31 - Webster/Beavercreek
- 33 - McLoughlin/King Rd
- 40 - Tacoma/Swan Island
- 71 - 60th Ave
- 72 - Killingsworth/82nd Ave
- 79 - Clackamas/Oregon City
- 155 - Sunnyside
- 156 - Mather Road

Discontinued 8/23/26

- 34-Linwood/River Rd
- 152 - Milwaukie

Also, Clackamas County-operated routes to Oregon City and the Clackamas Industrial Area

== See also ==
- List of TriMet transit centers
