= Jordan Schnitzer (disambiguation) =

Jordan Schnitzer may refer to:

- Jordan Schnitzer, American businessman and philanthropist, son of Harold and Arlene Schnitzer
  - Jordan Schnitzer Museum of Art, an art museum at the University of Oregon
  - Jordan Schnitzer Museum of Art at Portland State University
  - Jordan Schnitzer Museum of Art at Washington State University
