= Maseeh Hall =

Maseeh Hall may refer to:

- Fariborz Maseeh Hall, a building at Portland State University.
- Maseeh Hall, a dormitory at the Massachusetts Institute of Technology.
- Maseeh College of Engineering and Computer Science at Portland State University.
