= Jordan Schnitzer Museum of Art at Portland State University =

Contemporary art museum in Portland, Oregon, U.S.

- Logo
- Established: 2019
- Location: Portland, Oregon, United States
- Coordinates: 45.511°N 122.684°W
- Type: Art museum

The Jordan Schnitzer Museum of Art at Portland State University (JSMA at PSU) is a contemporary art museum located in downtown Portland, Oregon, United States. Established in 2019, it serves as a university art museum for Portland State University (PSU) and is part of a trio of Northwest museums (JSMA University of Oregon and JSMA Washington State University) named for philanthropist and collector Jordan Schnitzer. JSMA at PSU presents exhibitions by regional, national, and international artists and offers creative, educational, and research opportunities for PSU students, faculty, and staff in departments across campus.

The museum's mission is "Art for All", where art should be accessible to everyone regardless of socioeconomic background. It offers free admission to the public.

== History ==
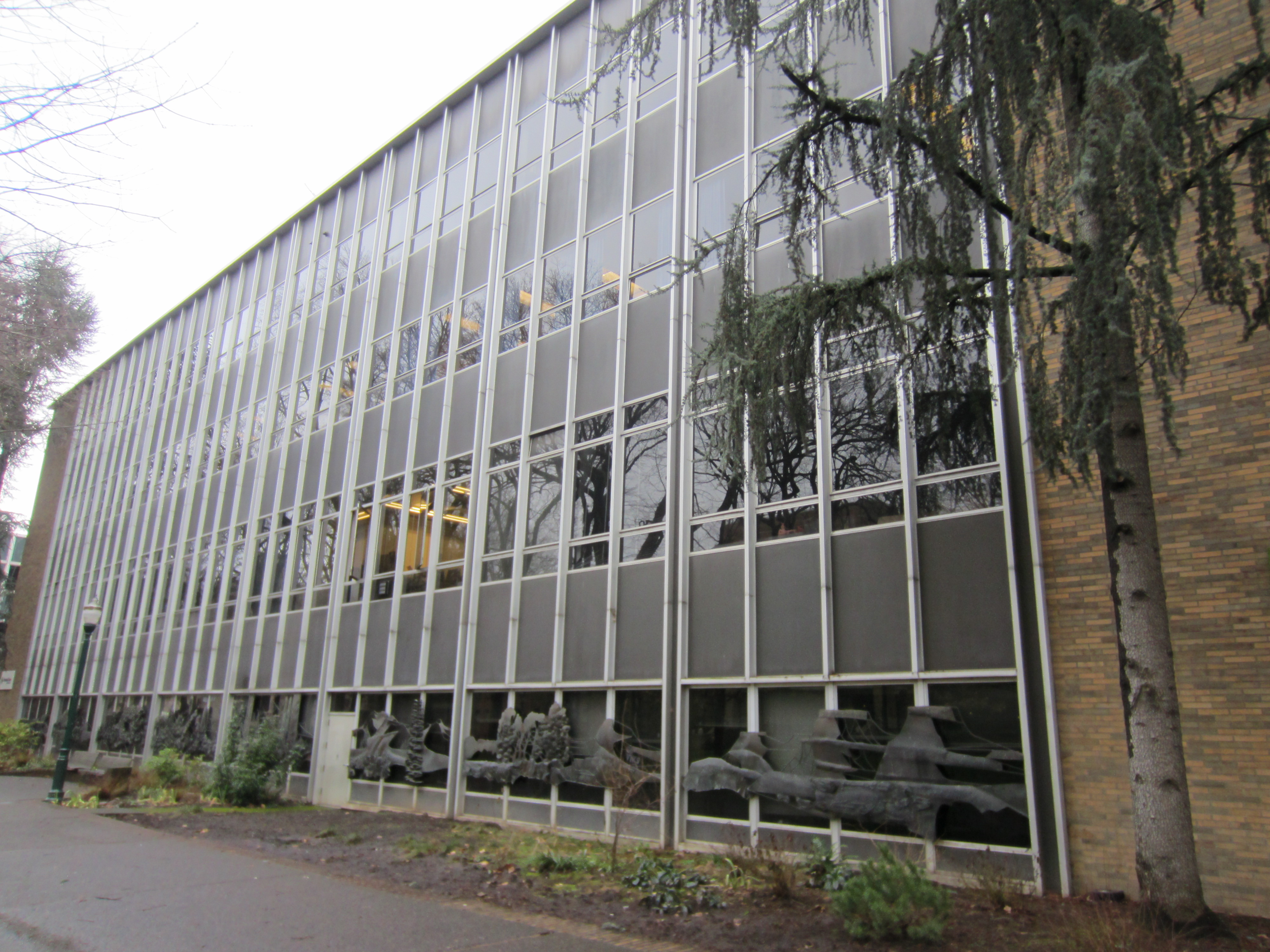
Exterior of Fariborz Maseeh Hall in 2014

The museum was made possible by a $5 million gift from Jordan Schnitzer and the Jordan Schnitzer Family Foundation. It officially opened its doors on November 7, 2019.

JSMA at PSU was designed specifically to bridge the gap between the university's urban campus and the broader Portland community. The museum encompasses approximately 7,500 square feet of gallery and educational space in Fariborz Maseeh Hall. The museum was part of a larger $70 million renovation of Neuberger Hall, a project aimed at revitalizing the heart of the PSU campus.

In 2024, the museum received a $4 million gift alongside a $5 million gift from Jordan Schnitzer towards the completion of the new Schnitzer School of Art + Art History + Design building, a mass-timber facility that further anchors the university's "Cultural District" at the south end of the Park Blocks.

=== Collections and exhibitions ===
The museum is non-collecting and does not house a permanent collection of its own; instead, it acts as a dynamic gallery space that creates rotating exhibitions focused on Northwest artists and contemporary global practices. It often draws from The Schnitzer Collection, which allows access to over 20,000 works from the Jordan Schnitzer Family Foundation, including major prints and multiples by artists like Andy Warhol, Kara Walker, and David Hockney.

Exhibitions include:

- Mapping Familiar Territories, Charting New Paths (2026): A major thematic exhibition exploring how artists reinterpret and expand mapping practices to explore questions of place, identity, and power. It features works by Enrique Chagoya, Brenda Mallory, and Epiphany Couch.
- Storywork: The Prints of Marie Watt (2025): A notable solo exhibition of the Seneca multimedia artist Marie Watt in her hometown of Portland, Oregon, showcasing over 70 prints, sculptures, and textiles which weave together Indigenous oral narratives and pop culture.
- Color Outside the Lines (2024): This exhibition explored the "dominance of form versus color" in art history, using David Batchelor's book Chromophobia as a jumping-off point. Work by Derrick Adams, Iván Carmona, James Lavadour and more.
- Just Playin’ Around (2025): An exploration of "play" as a form of political resistance and critical life force. It featured works by international and regional artists like Takashi Murakami, Erwin Wurm, Jeremy Okai Davis and Heidi Schwegler.
- Weaving Data (2023): This exhibition examined the intersection of traditional weaving and digital technology, featuring artists such as Faig Ahmed, April Bey, and Jovencio de la Paz.
- The Art of Food (2023): A look at food as a central theme in contemporary art, featuring 139 pieces from the Schnitzer Collection to show how artists use food to explore culture, status, and survival.

== See also ==
- Culture of Portland, Oregon
- List of museums in Portland, Oregon
