= Charles Ames Memorial City Park =

Park in Gladstone, Oregon, U.S.

- Location within Oregon
- Interactive map of Charles Ames Memorial City Park
- Location: Gladstone, Oregon, United States
- Coordinates: 45°22′44″N 122°35′28″W
- Area: 2.06 acres (0.83 ha)

Charles Ames Memorial City Park is a 2.06-acre (0.83 ha) park in Gladstone, Oregon, United States.
