= Clackamas Community College =

College in Oregon City, Oregon, U.S.

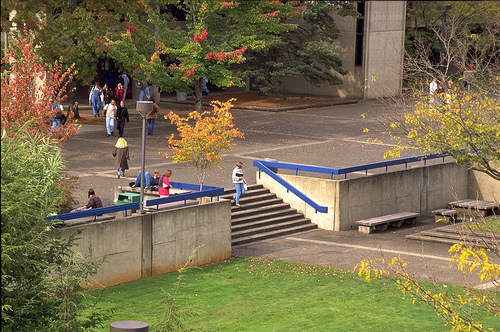
- CCC Oregon City Campus
- Type: Public community college
- Established: 1966
- President: Tim Cook
- Faculty: 165 (full-time); 380 (part-time)
- Students: 25,029 (total enrollment); 1,792 (full-time enrollment)
- Location: Oregon City, Oregon, U.S. 45.3238°N 122.5744°W
- Nickname: Cougars
- Website: www.clackamas.edu

Clackamas Community College (CCC) is a public community college in Oregon City, Oregon. Founded in 1966, it is one of the largest community colleges in the state of Oregon. Clackamas Community College offers courses at three campuses: the central campus in Oregon City, Harmony Community Campus in Clackamas, and the Wilsonville campus. Extension sites are also located in the towns of Canby and Molalla, where CCC offers English as a Second Language, GED in Spanish, computer science and community education classes. CCC is also the only college to offer an urban agriculture certificate in the state of Oregon.

Clackamas Community College is accredited by the Northwest Commission on Colleges and Universities (NWCCU). In 2009–10, CCC served more than 38,000 students and had approximately 8,900 FTE (full-time equivalent students).

== History ==
Clackamas Community College opened in 1966 with 693 part-time students taking classes at Gladstone High School. Two years later, ground was broken for Clairmont Building on the Oregon City Campus – CCC's first permanent home. The college has expanded significantly in the years since, and is now a network of three campuses serving a student body of more than 25,000 students, with more than 1,300 classes taught each term.A bond passed in November 2024 for campus construction and updates.

== Oregon City campus ==
Clackamas Community College's main campus is located in historic Oregon City, located off of Interstate 205, Highway 213 and Beavercreek Road. The 165-acre (67 ha) CCC Oregon City campus features 17 buildings, including the award-winning Niemeyer Center for Communication Arts, Roger Rook Hall and Art Center, as well as the athletic fields and facilities supporting CCC's sports programs. The Smuckers building was demolished in spring 2026 for the construction of the Douglas Loop walking trail. Construction on the Holden Natural Resources Center is scheduled to start in the fall of 2026 and be completed in the spring of 2028.

== Harmony Campus ==
The Harmony Community Campus offers courses to train students for jobs in the healthcare field. The college's newest building not only houses the college's center for health education, but also a variety of student services and programs, including courses toward an Oregon transfer degree. The Harmony Community Campus is centrally located in North Clackamas, close to the Clackamas Town Center and the Green Line light rail.

The Harmony Community Campus also is home to:

- The Small Business Development Center
- Drivers Education
- Academic pathway programs including the Portland State University Evening/Weekend Business Degree Program.
- OIT building: Seasoned Adult Enrichment Program, GED, instructional courses

== Wilsonville campus ==
CCC's Wilsonville campus (the Wilsonville Training Center – WTC), located just off I-5, offers programs to prepare career-seekers for jobs in the utility and energy management industry and serves as a utility training center for employees of area utilities including Portland General Electric and PacifiCorp. CCC general education courses are also offered, in the evenings and on weekends throughout the year, for various degrees including the Oregon AAOT Transfer degree.

The Wilsonville campus broke ground in 1991. It is located at 29353 Town Center Loop East in Wilsonville.

== Athletics ==
Clackamas Community College competes in the Northwest Athletic Conference (NWAC) as the Cougars. CCC offers 11 competitive college sports including men's baseball, women's softball, men and women's basketball, track, cross country, women's volleyball, women's soccer, and wrestling.

== Notable faculty and staff ==
- Craig Lesley – Regional author
- Fariborz Maseeh – Engineer, Philanthropist

== Notable alumni ==
- Brian Abshire (1998) – Olympics competitor in Steeplechase
- Ron Jones (1998) – Hollywood composer (Family Guy, American Dad!)
- Matt Lindland (2000) – Olympics Silver medalist in wrestling, retired Mixed Martial Artist, and former Oregon politician
- Jeff Ogden (1993) – former NFL player

== See also ==
- Haggart Observatory
- List of colleges and universities in Oregon
