= Stocker Park =

Park in Gladstone, Oregon, U.S.

- Location within Oregon
- Location: Gladstone, Oregon, U.S.
- Coordinates: 45°22′59.4″N 122°35′0.4″W
- Area: 0.05 acres (0.020 ha)

Stocker Park is a 0.05-acre (0.020 ha) park at the eastern end of E. Clarendon Street in Gladstone, Oregon, United States. The landscaped park serves as a memorial to a former resident.
