= Jordan Schnitzer =

American businessman and philanthropist

- Born: Jordan Director Schnitzer; May 10, 1951 (age 75); Portland, Oregon, U.S.
- Education: Catlin Gabel School; University of Oregon (BA); Lewis and Clark College (JD)
- Occupations: Businessman; philanthropist; art collector
- Political party: Democratic
- Spouse: Mina Morvai (1996-2005)
- Children: 4
- Parents: Harold Schnitzer (father); Arlene Director (mother)
- Family: Schnitzer family Director family

Jordan Director Schnitzer (born 10 May 1951) is an American businessman, philanthropist, and art collector. The son of philanthropists Harold and Arlene Schnitzer, he is the president and CEO of Schnitzer Properties, president of the Harold and Arlene Schnitzer CARE foundation, and a member of the Lewis & Clark Law School Board of Visitors. He is one of the wealthiest people in Oregon and one of the top 10 private landowners on the west coast.

An avid art collector since childhood, Schnitzer is the owner of the largest fine art print collection in the United States and owns one of the largest collection of Andy Warhol prints, drawings, and photographs. His full art collection includes over 22,000 sculptures, paintings, glass, and mixed media works. His foundation, the Jordan Schnitzer Family Foundation, which he founded and serves as president of, makes this collection available to museums and similar institutions throughout the world. Schnitzer is the namesake of three museums, the Jordan Schnitzer Museum of Art at the University of Oregon, the Jordan Schnitzer Museum of Art at Portland State University, and the Jordan Schnitzer Museum of Art at Washington State University. He is also the namesake of Portland State University's Schnitzer School of Art + Art History + Design, which is currently under construction.

== Early life and education ==
Jordan D. Schnitzer was born on May 10, 1951 in Portland, Oregon to philanthropists Harold Schnitzer and Arlene Director. He grew up in Southwest Portland and graduated from Catlin Gabel School in 1969, a private Kx12 school in West Haven-Sylvan.

While in third grade, Arlene gave him his first art print. At age 14, he purchased his first work, an oil painting by local artist Louis Bunce, for $60 from his mother's gallery. He initially began collecting Pacific Northwest art, eventually adding art form other places.

Schnitzer received his bachelor of arts in literature from the University of Oregon in 1973 and received his juris doctor from the Lewis & Clark College Law School in 1976.

== Career and philanthropy ==
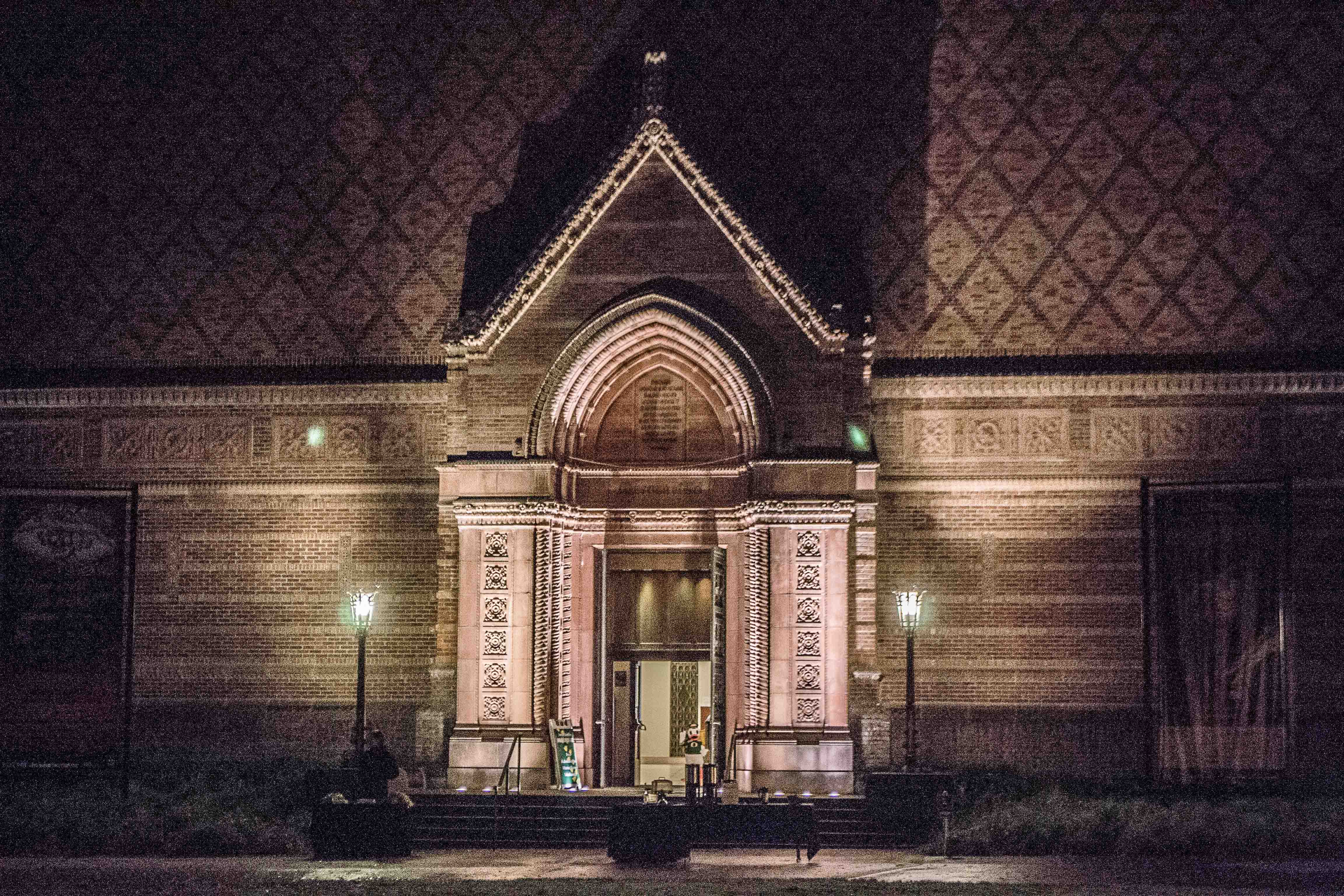
The Jordan Schnitzer Museum of Art at the University of Oregon

Jordan's mother, Arlene, opened the Fountain Gallery of Art in Portland in 1963, after which she began gifting artworks to Jordan. His first art purchase was a small painting by local artist Louis Bunce in 1965. Since then, his fine art collection has grown to be the largest in the United States. He is the single largest owner of Andy Warhol, Kara Walker, Hank Willis Thomas, and Jeffrey Gibson works, and his collection contains over 22,000 items by about 1,500 artists. In 1976, he joined Harsch Investment Properties, his father's company, which is now known as Schnitzer Properties. In 1997, he founded the Jordan Schnitzer Family Foundation which makes his art collection available to museums and similar institutions throughout the world. Schnitzer is the namesake and donor of three museums, the Jordan Schnitzer Museum of Art at the University of Oregon, the Jordan Schnitzer Museum of Art at Portland State University, and the Jordan Schnitzer Museum of Art at Washington State University. He is the main donor of Portland State University's Schnitzer School of Art + Art History + Design, which is currently under construction.

== Personal life ==
Schnitzer married real estate developer Mina Morvai On June 30, 1996. They had 2 daughters before divorcing in 2005. Schnitzer dated ex-Playboy model Sally Hopper from 2012 to 2013.

Schnitzer is Jewish and a member of Congregation Beth Israel. He served on their board of trustees from 1982 to 1988, and one of the main buildings on the Beth Israel campus is named for his family. He is a member of the exclusive Bohemian Club.

=== Legal issues ===
In January 2014, Schnitzer began dating Cory Sause, the heir to a tugboat company in Coos Bay. In 2006, Sause was involved in a drunk driving accident when she accidentally killed a 21 year old college student and injured his younger brother. Schnitzer and Sause had a son, Samuel, through a surrogate mother which led to a court battle. Schnitzer signed a contract with Sause that he would only take custody of the child if it was a boy and that Sause would "play no role in the child’s life.” They had broken up sometime before the child was born. In 2017, a Multnomah County Circuit Court judge initially ruled that Sause is the legal mother of the child, and that Schnitzer was not the sole legal parent. The Oregon Court of Appeals reversed that decision in a 2-1 decision, ruling that Schnitzer is entitled to be declared the child's sole legal parent. In 2017, Schnitzer had another son, Simon, through another surrogate mother.

=== Politics ===
Schnitzer is a Democrat, but has supported Republicans as well. In 2016, he donated about $11,000 to Hillary Clinton's presidential campaign. He also donated to the congressional campaigns of Kurt Schrader, Suzanne Bonamici, and Republican Greg Walden. In 2020, he donated $2,800 to Joe Biden's presidential campaign.

In the 2022 Portland City Commission election, Schnitzer leased office space to the Rene Gonzalez campaign, a 3,185 sqft property, for $250 per month plus utilities. The retail listing for the space was $6,900, causing controversy. Gonzalez was initially fined $77,140 for not reporting the discount on rent to the city and for violating campaign finance laws by accepting over the allowed amount for campaigns running with public funding. A judge later overruled the fine, citing failure on the city's part to prove the actual value of the space. Schnitzer commented that he would have made the same deal with any politician or nonprofit whose views he thought were "important and constructive to our city," and also commented that there was little to no economic activity downtown at the time and Gonzalez "did us a favor." Schnitzer told KGW in an interview that he was "impressed by [Gonzalez's] background and his political philosophies."
