= Arlene Schnitzer Concert Hall =

Historic theater and performing arts center in Portland, Oregon, U.S.

Coordinates: 45.516936°N 122.681458°W

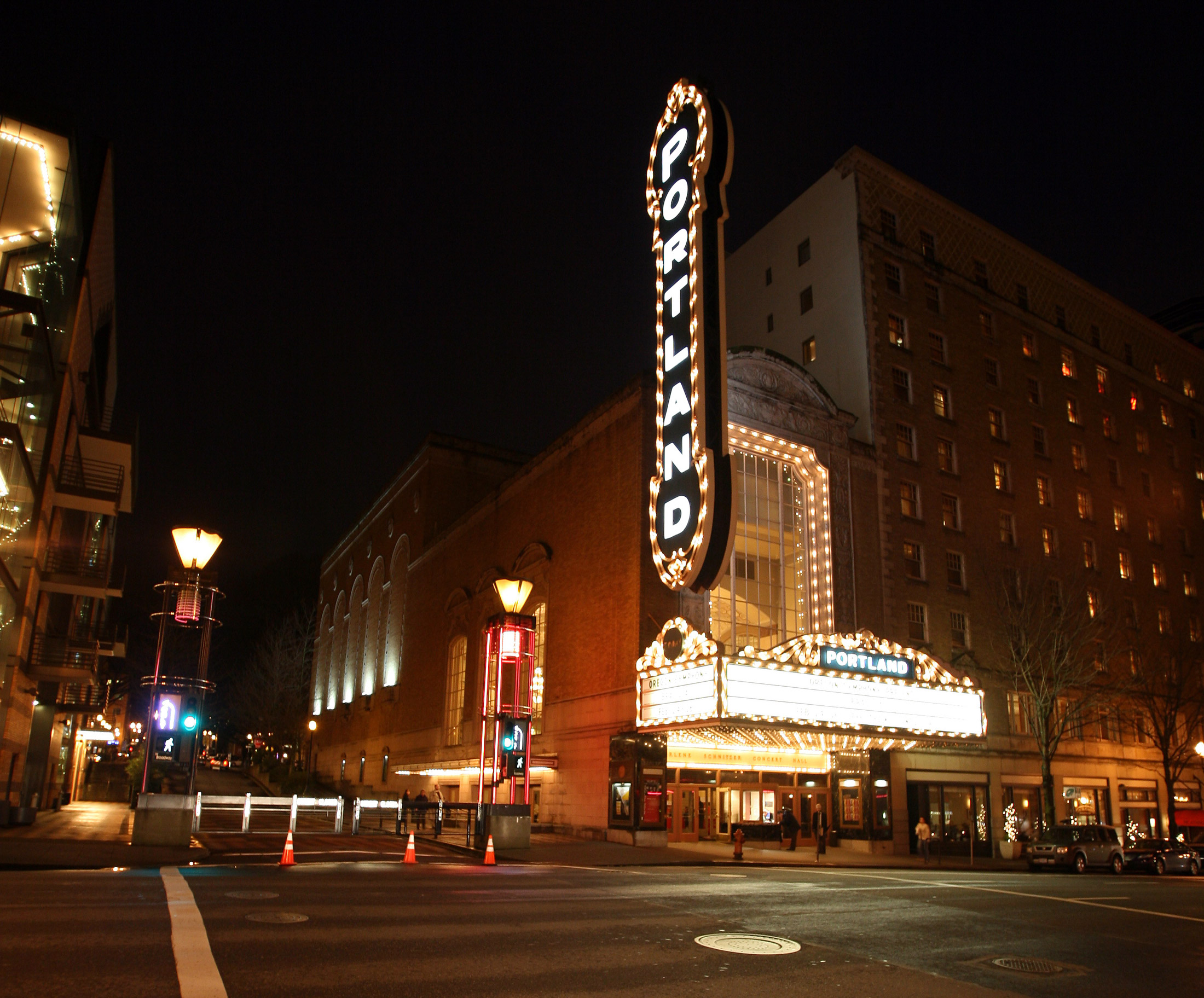
- Exterior of venue seen from Broadway (c. 2007)
- Interactive map of Arlene Schnitzer Concert Hall
- Former names: Portland Publix Theatre (1928–30); Paramount Theatre (1930–84)
- Address: 1037 SW Broadway; Portland, OR 97205-3004
- Location: Downtown Portland
- Owner: City of Portland
- Operator: Portland's Centers for the Arts
- Capacity: 2,776

Construction
- Opened: March 8, 1928
- Closed: 1982
- Reopened: September 8, 1984
- Cost: $1.5 million ($27.8 million in 2025 dollars)
- Architect: Rapp and Rapp

Website
- Venue Website
- Paramount Theatre
- U.S. National Register of Historic Places
- Portland Historic Landmark
- Architectural style: Italian Rococo Revival
- NRHP reference No.: 76001585
- Added to NRHP: April 22, 1976

The Arlene Schnitzer Concert Hall (originally Portland Publix Theatre and Paramount Theatre) is a historic theater building and performing arts center in Portland, Oregon, United States. Part of the Portland Center for the Performing Arts, it is home to the Oregon Symphony, Portland Youth Philharmonic, Metropolitan Youth Symphony, White Bird Dance Company, and Portland Arts & Lectures. It is also a concert and film venue.

The theater is locally nicknamed "The Schnitz." It is Portland's last surviving theater building on Broadway.

== Specifics ==
- Seating for 2,776 (includes lower orchestra level and upper balcony seats)
- Dressing rooms for 90
- Portable acoustic shell
- Entries on Broadway, Main Street, and Park Avenue. (Salmon Street has only stage doors and public exits.)

== Building history ==
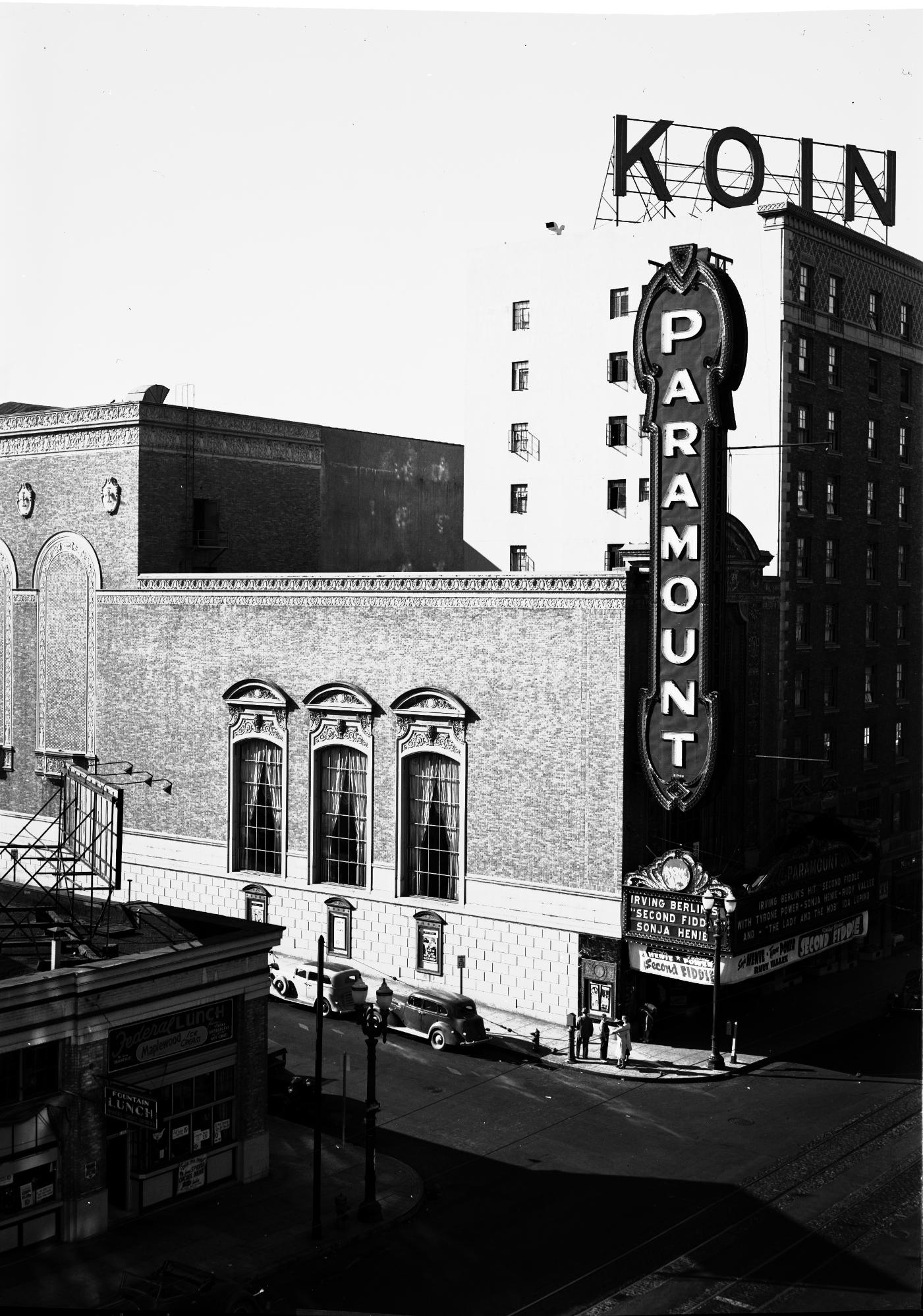
Paramount Theatre in 1939

=== Movie house ===
The architectural firm Rapp and Rapp, famous for its theater buildings, designed the Italian Renaissance-style building. The building was variously described by the newspapers as being of the French Renaissance or Northern Italianate style. The Paramount was considered, at its opening, to be the largest and most lavish theater for a city the size of Portland. Originally opened as the Portland Publix Theatre, a vaudeville venue in March 1928, the name changed to the Paramount Theater in 1930, as the owners had a contract to run Paramount films locally. The building continued to show films until 1972, after which it hosted concerts.

Visitors were greeted by a 65-foot (20 m) high "Portland" sign above the Broadway Marquee, which contained approximately 6,000 theatrical lights. The sign was changed to read "Paramount" in 1930, remaining until 1984, when it was restored to "Portland". The theatre was designed with many foyers and lobbies. The main entrance to the auditorium boasted huge French-paned windows facing east and south, covered with velvet drapes. The walls were covered with mirrors and marble, and the floors were covered with expensive carpets. The furnishings had been purchased from a French museum and private collections. The concessions stand was made of marble and stretched nearly half the length of the main lobby. It was described as the "longest candy counter in the West."

Nearly $35,000 had been spent on the lobby's huge crystal chandeliers. The largest had a span of nearly 8 feet (2.4 m), weighing over 1,700 pounds (770 kg) and containing 181 lights. Currently, the largest chandelier has 137 candle bulbs, and the smaller ones each have 124 bulbs.

The top row of the balcony seats was six stories above the stage. Small staircases from the main lobby led to the balcony area which contained men's and ladies' lounges. The men's lounge was equipped with fireplaces, telephones, radios, phonographs and attendants. The women's lounge was furnished with dressing tables, mirrors, maids and hairdressers. There was also a self-playing Louis XV Ampico-Knabe grand piano in ivory and gold on the bridge over the lobby.

The walls of the auditorium were elaborately decorated with murals and near the front of the stage, small balconies were hung with drapes which hid the pipes from the $46,500 Wurlitzer organ. This four-manual organ console was mounted on an elevator and could be raised to the level of the stage at the touch of a button.

The seating capacity of the theater was reported to have been 4000 seats by newspaper advertisements of the day. The ads promised "An acre of seats". In actuality, the seating capacity was approximately 3000.

The ceilings were of a special design. The ceiling panels were suspended from the roof of the building and jutted out toward the sides of the auditorium, leaving a small cove next to the wall. A series of electric light bulbs were set in the hollow, not visible to the audience. Their glow fell on the patrons indirectly, giving the effect of space and freedom.

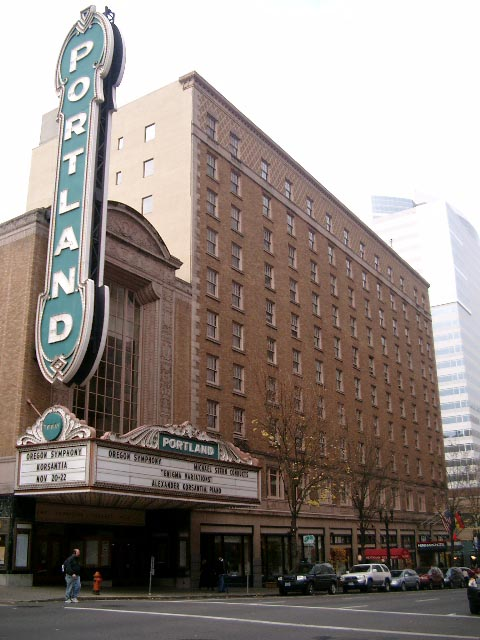
Arlene Schnitzer Concert Hall and Heathman Hotel.

The orchestra pit could hold a 30-piece orchestra. There was also a "flying" stage which could be raised or lowered or moved about above the main stage.

On July 30, 1928, a photo of the theatre appeared on the front page of The Oregonian newspaper. The theatre had figured in an unusual robbery by a young man named Robert Nolan. Nolan, who had lived in Southern California for a time, had appeared as an extra in a movie titled Wheel of Chance (1928). Nolan had moved back to Oregon and when he saw that the movie was showing at the Portland Theatre, he decided to go see himself on the "silver screen." While in the lobby, he noticed two people walking by carrying the day's receipts. On impulse, Nolan went to the box office and held up the attendants for $1,176. When he was apprehended several days later, Nolan had spent all but $1.50 of the money on bootleggers and drinking parties.

During the Great Depression, the theatre hired roving musicians and a "psychic" to entertain in the lobby before movies, in an effort to attract patrons to the theatre. Admission was 50 cents at this point, down 10 cents from opening night.

By 1936, the theater had been sold to the Evergreen chain, in conjunction with John Hamrick, and between them, they owned eight movie theatres in Portland.

Both the exterior and interior of the building had deteriorated through the years and in September 1965, part of the cast iron balcony facing Park Avenue (a 150 lb (68 kg) piece of gingerbread), gave way and fell to the pavement below. The break was along an old fracture line caused by a previous earthquake. The iron had rusted over time without proper maintenance. In August 1970, chunks of the masonry on the corner of Main and Broadway gave way. Two huge blocks, 350 lb (160 kg) each, fell from the facade, one of them crashing into the main marquee below. The masonry blocks were said to have fallen due to the age of the building. The owners did not seem to be putting any money into maintenance of the theatre. In December 1970, the building was put up for sale and was purchased in 1971 by John Haviland, who owned the Park-Haviland Hotel. The theatre was then leased to Tom Moyer, owner of the Moyer Theater chain.

=== Concert venue ===
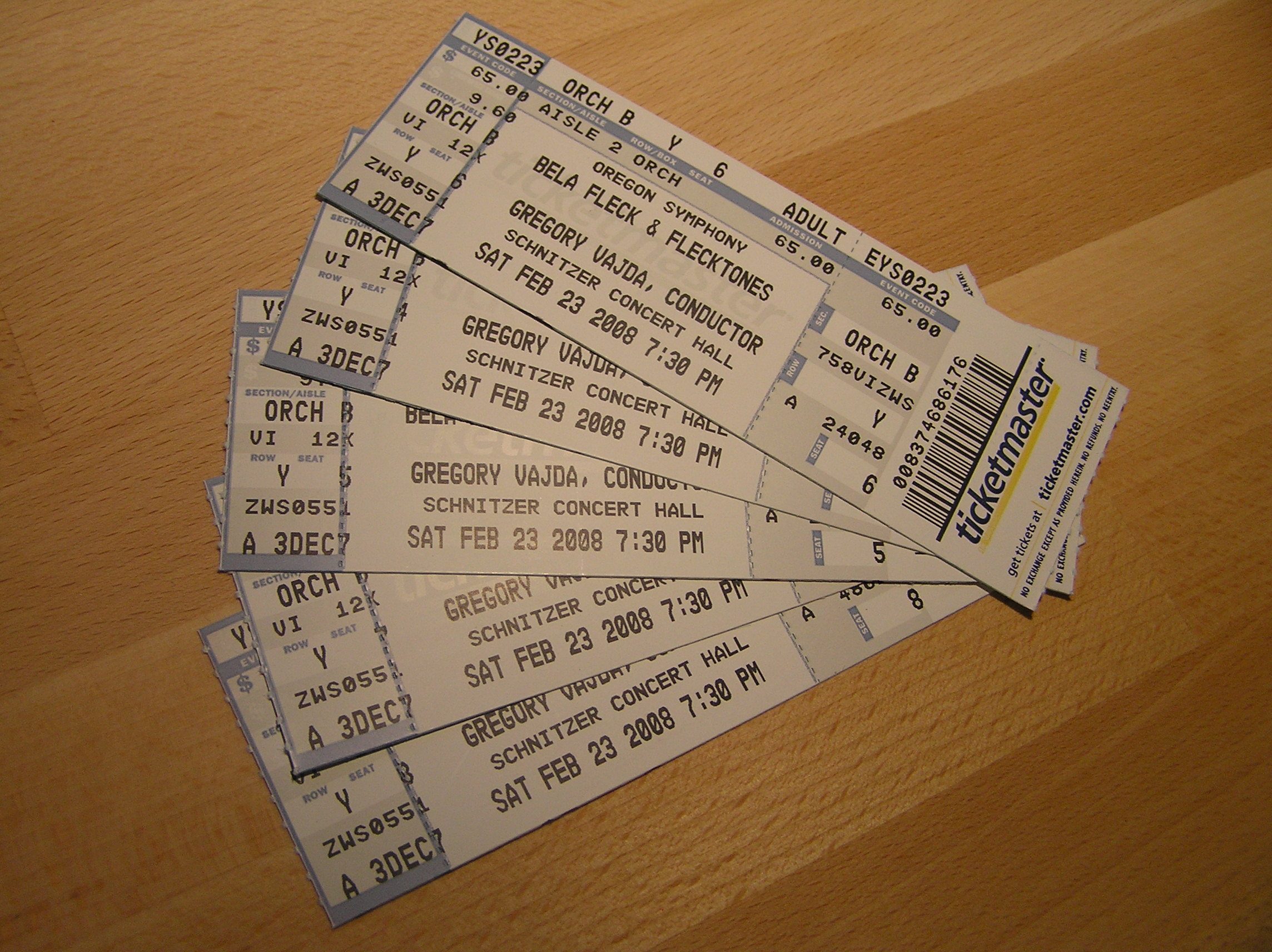
Tickets for a February 2008 performance by Bela Fleck and the Flecktones, with the Oregon Symphony

Haviland felt that it was uneconomical to operate a 3000-seat movie theater in the days of television. On August 15, 1972, Dr. Phibes Rises Again starring Vincent Price, was the last first-run film shown at the theatre. In 1972, a Seattle-based partnership was formed, Paramount Northwest. They leased the theatre for three years, with an option for six more, and promoted live concerts. Heart played there as part of the "Catch a Rising Star" series (which included Tom Petty and Elvis Costello, among others), for the admission price of 92 cents (promoted by local radio station KGON, 92.3 FM). John Haviland still owned it and claimed that the rent was "1/10 of what it should be for such a theatre": $4000 per month. In December 1972, Haviland proposed a state-run gambling casino on the property, claiming he was losing more than he could afford on the Paramount. On December 1, 1972, Black Oak Arkansas recorded a concert here that provided three of the seven songs on the band's 1973 album, "Raunch 'N' Roll Live."

In March 1975, Haviland conducted an auction during which he sold off all the theatres' statuary, pipe organ, antique furniture, 16th century suit of armor, mirrors, china, oriental rugs, original oil paintings, lighted gold-leaf music stands and 3 grand pianos; basically everything that was not attached to the walls or floors. Haviland was trying to drive out the rock-concert promoting tenants and went into a legal dispute with Paramount Northwest over the lease. He felt that the young people targeted by the concerts were not spending enough money and were vandalizing and destroying the theatre. Haviland won a court case preventing Paramount Northwest from renewing their lease option. Haviland intended to renovate the theatre and offer a higher-class type of entertainment, including dinner theatre.

In August 1976, the Paramount Theatre was sold to Seattle-based West Coast Theatres company. The owner offered to sell the property to the city for $4 million in 1980, but the city council debated whether to renovate the Paramount Theatre or demolish it and build a new performing arts center from the ground up.

In 1982, the City of Portland negotiated with the owner to buy the theatre but talks broke down. The city council finally voted to condemn the building. A condemnation hearing jury determined that the city would have to pay the owner $4.1 million as compensation for the building.

The theater cost $500,000 to build in 1928. As of October 2006, "The Schnitz" was assessed by Multnomah County at more than $32 million.

=== Restoration ===
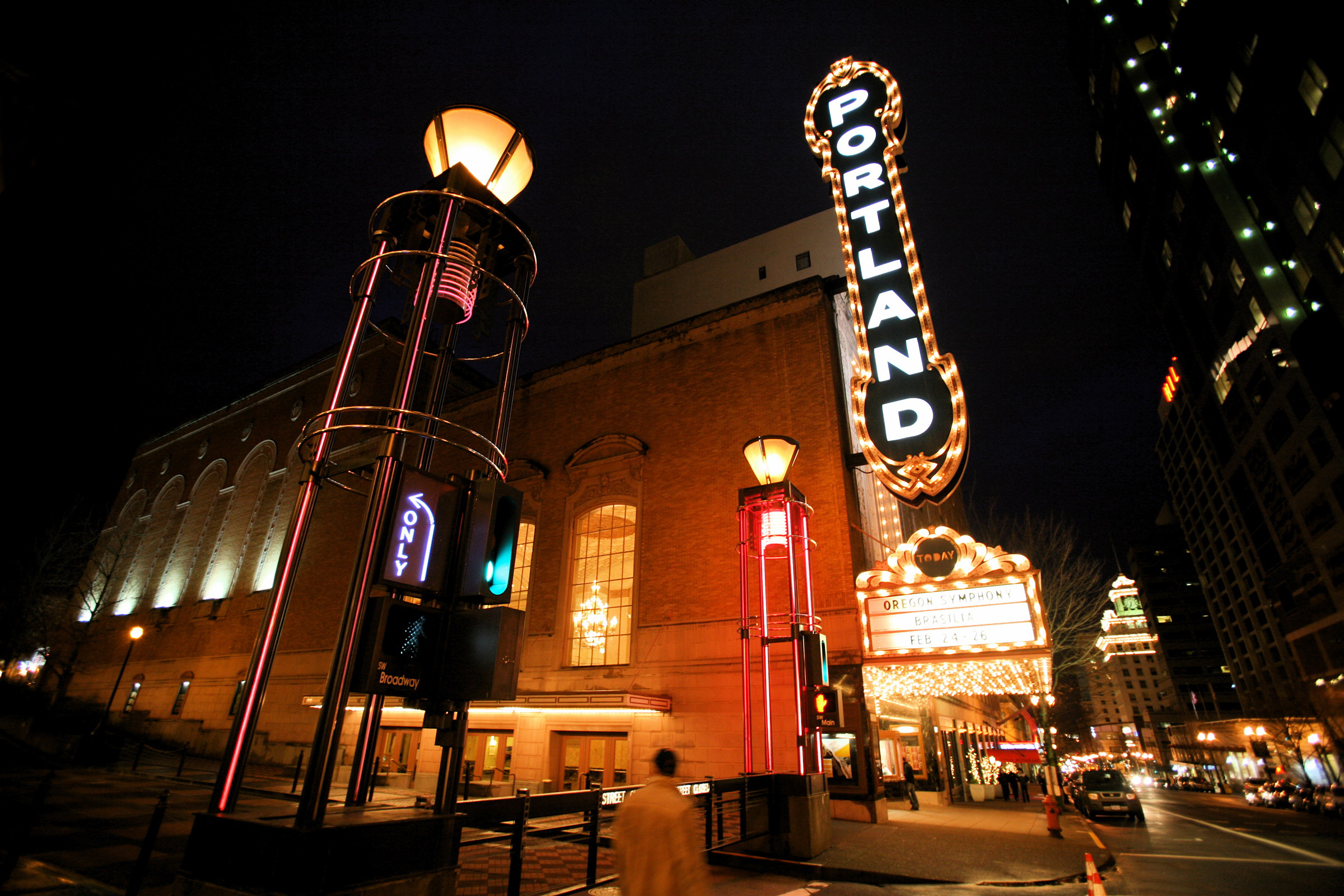
The Schnitzer at night

In 1972, the Portland City Council voted to give the building Landmark Status, over the objections of John Haviland, the owner. The landmark status applied only to the exterior of the building. Many people felt that the interior of the building was more valuable architecturally. The building (as the Paramount Theatre) was placed on the National Register of Historic Places in 1976.

A major renovation began in September 1983 to the designs of Boora Architects, restoring the building to much of its original opulence. The interior of the auditorium, however, was painted one neutral color, rather than restoring the murals that had decorated it. Portland residents Arlene and Harold Schnitzer contributed generously to the completion of the initial phase of the Portland Center for the Performing Arts. The one-year, $10 million renovation involved repairing, recasting or replacing much of the theatre's ornate interior as well as making it comfortable and safe for today's audiences and performers.

The landmark 65-foot-tall "Paramount" sign was removed on March 18, 1984, to be used by Ballard Sign Company of Salem as a model for a new replica which would restore the wording used originally (1928–1930): "Portland", appropriate for the building's change in use as well as being historically fitting. The new replica sign, with neon letters five feet tall, was attached to the building on September 4, 1984. The theatre re-opened later the same month.

The concert hall now plays host to a variety of presentations including classical, jazz, pop, rock, folk and gospel music, dance, theatre, travel films, conferences, and weddings.

The concert hall features:

- Seating for 2,776 in orchestra level and balcony.
- 94 × 32-foot (9.8 m) stage with 54 × 32-foot (9.8 m) traditional proscenium.
- Orchestra pit for 15; a choir loft.
- Dressing rooms for 90.
- Portable, flexible acoustical shell.

Design highlights: wool carpeting designed in Portland and loomed in New Zealand; original chandeliers renovated and fitted with new crystal in rococo-style lobby; original ornate interior re-paneled, recast and replaced; classic colors of warm neutrals and teal replaced the original dark and heavy gold, green and rose.

When the performing arts center was opened in 1984, it was decided to name the Portland Theatre building after Arlene Schnitzer.

The original theater organ and statuary were sold off in an auction on March 26, 1975. During the auction, there was a general outcry from the audience to keep a particular marble statue, called "Surprise" (a nude girl with her hands thrown across her face) in the theater. A hat was passed among the 1200 member audience to take up a collection, and $5,233.97 was raised to purchase the statue and keep it in the theater lobby. The statue has a finger missing from a bullet from a box-office robbery in the 1950s.

== Notable stage appearances ==
Partial list of notable personal appearances made on the stage of the Arlene Schnitzer Concert Hall:

- Eugene Pallette (May 1930)
- Stepin Fetchit (May 28 - June 3, 1931)
- Anita Page (September 2, 1931)
- Betty Compson (March 3–9, 1932)
- Blanche Sweet (August 18–24, 1932)
- Conchita Montenegro (September 29 - October 5, 1932)
- The Marx Brothers (May 1–7, 1935)
- Grace Moore (April 1939)
- Ronald Reagan and Donald Crisp (October 19, 1940)
- The Andrews Sisters (May 30 - June 5, 1946)
- Betty Hutton (January 1953)
- Louis Armstrong (February 1954)
- Frank Sinatra (June 7, 1957)
- Harry Belafonte (June 1957)
- Buddy Holly, Chuck Berry, The Everly Brothers, and Fats Domino (October 22, 1957)
- Sam Cooke, The Everly Brothers, Paul Anka, and Frankie Avalon (May 14, 1958)
- Maurice Chevalier (June 1958)
- Louis Armstrong (September 1959)
- Vincent Price (October 1959)
- Liberace (May 29, 1962)
- Joan Baez (March 1964)
- Bob Dylan (March 1966, January and December 1980, August 1990, June 1995, May 2022)
- Grateful Dead (July 1972, June 1976, October 1977)
- George Carlin (March 9, 1973)
- Stevie Wonder (March 10, 1973)
- Don Ameche (June 1973)
- Fleetwood Mac (November 1974, August 1975)
- Jerry Garcia Band (March 1975, October 1978)
- Frank Zappa (October 1975, March and October 1980)
- Bruce Springsteen (October 25, 1975, December 19, 1978, October 28, 1996)
- Rain: A Tribute to the Beatles (June 7, 1976)
- Rush (October 1976, September 1977)
- Billy Joel (February and October, 1977)
- Queen (March 12, 1977)
- Genesis (April 1, 1977)
- Iggy Pop with David Bowie on piano and backing vocals (April 4 and 5, 1977)
- Jimmy Buffett (June 4, 1977)
- Hall & Oates (October 22, 1977)
- Elvis Costello (February 1978, February 1979)
- Patti Smith (May 5, 1978)
- Bob Marley and the Wailers (July 16, 1978)
- Talking Heads (September 9, 1978)
- ABBA (September 18, 1979)
- Tom Petty and the Heartbreakers (December 1979, April 1983)
- The Police (February 5, 1980)
- The Allman Brothers Band (September 19, 1981)
- Def Leppard (November 4, 1981)
- The Go-Go's (August 23, 1982)
- Heart (December 29, 1982)
- U2 (May 27, 1983)
- The Cure (October 23, 1984)
- Madonna (April 1985)
- Leonard Cohen (October 1988)
- Roy Orbison (October 1988)
- Phish (August 26, 1993)
- Tori Amos (July 1996, December 2007, November 2017)
- Ringo Starr & His All-Starr Band (April 1997)
- Neil Young (March 1999)
- Oasis (April 2000)
- Coldplay (June 2001)
- Prince (April 2002)
- Mariah Carey (December 9, 2003)
- Kelly Clarkson (May 28, 2005)
- Brian Wilson (August 2005, October 2016)
- Pearl Jam (July 20, 2006)
- Tenacious D (February 19th, 2007)
- Bill Clinton (April 20, 2007)
- Arcade Fire (May 27, 2007)
- The Decemberists (February 19, 2011)
- Fiona Apple (July 26, 2012)
- Robin Williams (January 11, 2013)
- Soundgarden (February 14, 2013)
- The Monkees (August 18, 2014)
- Pixies (February 19, 2014)
- Steely Dan (July 24, 2014)
- Ryan Adams (October 5, 2014)
- Wilco (September 4, 2016)
- The National (November 27, 2017)
- Hillary Clinton (October 21, 2024)

== See also ==
- Culture of Portland, Oregon
- List of concert halls
- Portland sign
