= High Rocks Park =

Public park and swimming hole in Gladstone, Oregon, U.S.

- Location within Oregon
- Location: Gladstone, Oregon, United States
- Coordinates: 45°22′47″N 122°34′58″W

High Rocks Park is a public park and swimming hole in Gladstone, Oregon, United States.

The park has been known for hosting summer recreation, as well as for diving and swimming accidents.
