= Gladstone Nature Park =

Park in Gladstone, Oregon, U.S.

- Location within Oregon
- Location: 18111 Webster Road, Gladstone, Oregon, United States
- Coordinates: 45°23′23″N 122°35′10″W

Gladstone Nature Park is a park in Gladstone, Oregon, United States.
