= Gladstone School District =

School district in Oregon, United States

Location
- Gladstone, Oregon United States

District information
- Type: Public school district
- Motto: Growing Great People
- Grades: K-12
- Superintendent: Dr. Karen Fischer Gray
- Accreditation: NWAC

Students and staff
- Students: 1,580
- Athletic conference: Tri-Valley

Other information
- Website: www.gladstone.k12.or.us

Gladstone School District is a four-school public school district serving Gladstone, Oregon, United States. The interim superintendent is Karen Fischer Gray.

== Demographics ==
In the 2024-25 school year, the district served 1,580 students: 1% American Indian/Alaska Native; 1% Asian; 1% Black/African American; 18% Hispanic/Latino; 1% Native Hawaiian/Pacific Islander; 9% Multiracial; 69% White; 17% Students with disabilities; 26% Students experiencing poverty; 11% English learners.

== Schools ==
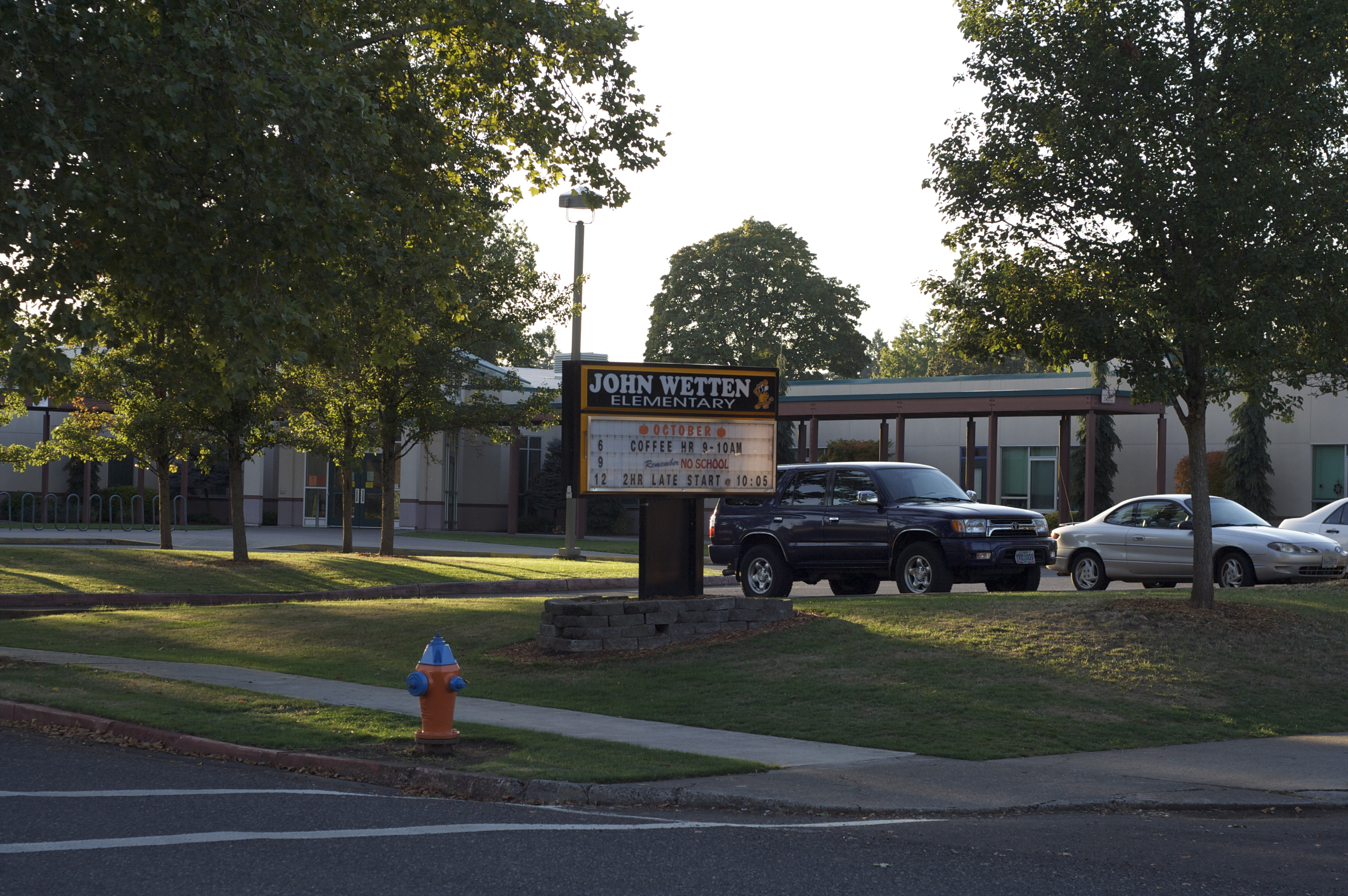
John Wetten Elementary

The district's schools are the Gladstone Center for Children & Families (preschool and kindergarten), John Wetten Elementary School (grades 1-5), Kraxberger Middle School (grades 6 to 8), and Gladstone High School (grades 9 to 12). During the 2024-25 school year, GCCF had an enrollment of 107 kindergarteners, Wetten Elementary had 595 enrolled students, Kraxberger had 345 students and GHS had 533.

== Gladstone school bonds ==
A school bond was passed for the Gladstone School District during the November 2006 general election. The estimated cost of the construction was $40,000,000. The money was used to help all schools in the district, however, the majority of the money funded both the renovation/expansion of Gladstone High School and the establishment of the new Gladstone Center for Children & Families.

Voters approved another school bond in the November 2026 election, which obligated property taxpayers to another 20 years of school facility costs at a lower tax rate than they had been paying on the 2006 bond. The latest bond focused on basic student safety measures along with roofing, HVAC and electrical upgrades.

== Statewide recognition ==
At the beginning of the 2024-25 school year, the Gladstone School District received statewide recognition for its success in increasing enrollment through a citywide Gladstone Shows Up campaign.
