= Haggart Observatory =

Observatory in Oregon, US

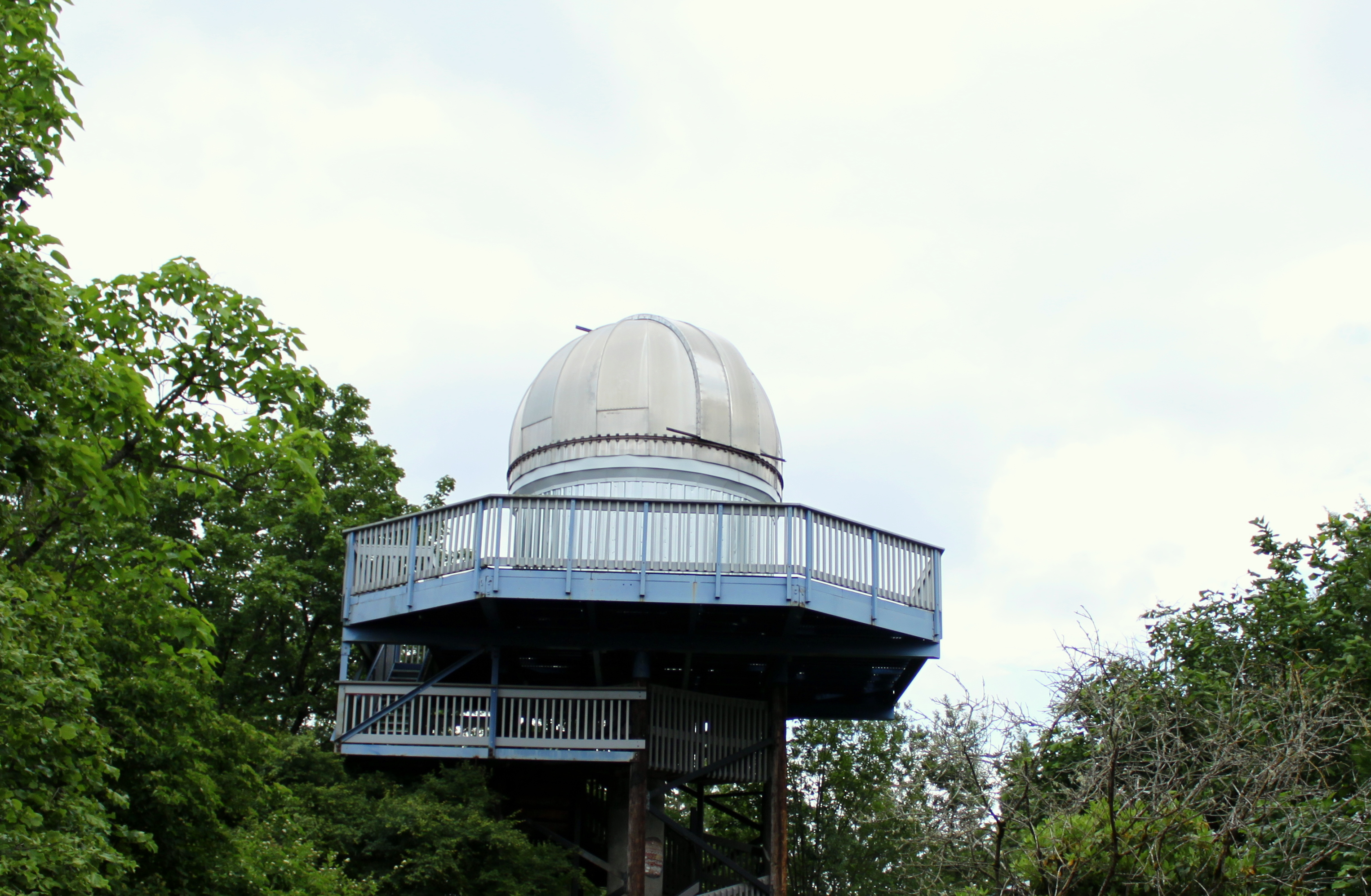
- Organization: Clackamas Community College
- Location: Oregon City, Oregon
- Coordinates: 45.3233°N 122.5783°W
- Altitude: 400 feet (120 m)
- Website: depts.clackamas.edu/haggart/

Telescopes
- 24" f/4.8: Newtonian Reflector
- 14" f/10: Celestron Schmidt-Cassegrain
- 13.1" f/4.5: Newtonian Reflector
- 10" f/4.5: Newtonian Reflector
- 6" f/12: Refractor
- 4" f/15: Unitron Refractor

Haggart Observatory is an astronomical observatory found at the John Inskeep Environmental Learning Center of Clackamas Community College. It is located in Oregon City, Oregon, United States.

== See also ==
- List of observatories
