= Arlene Schnitzer =

American art collector (1929–2020)

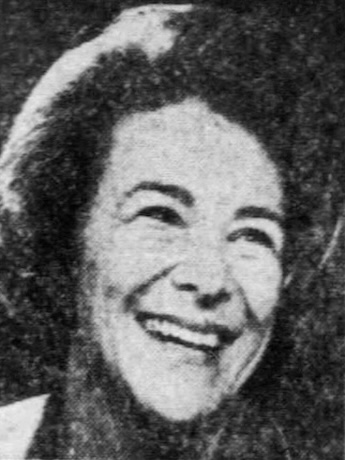
- Schnitzer in 1974
- Born: Arlene Director; January 10, 1929; Salem, Oregon, U.S.
- Died: April 4, 2020 (aged 91); Portland, Oregon, U.S.
- Spouse: Harold Schnitzer (m. 1949; died 2011)
- Children: 1

Arlene Schnitzer (née Director; January 10, 1929 – April 4, 2020) was an American arts patron and philanthropist. She was the founder and director of the Fountain Gallery, established in Portland to showcase artists in the Pacific Northwest. She is the namesake of the Arlene Schnitzer Concert Hall, a performing arts center in Portland, Oregon.

== Life and career ==
Schnitzer was born to Simon and Helen (Holtzman) Director in Salem, Oregon, on January 10, 1929. Her parents were Jewish emigrants, her father from Chartoriysk, Russia, and her mother from Warsaw, Poland. She lived in Salem until age two, when her parents moved to Portland, Oregon. The family first lived in the Grant Park neighborhood. Schnitzer attended Fernwood Grammar School. From fourth to seventh grade, she attended Laurelhurst Grammar School. Following another relocation, she attended Multnomah Grammar School, the school from which she graduated. Schnitzer recalled "[growing] up in a retail business"; her parents were the owners of Jennings Furniture Company, a large furniture store.

In 1949, Arlene met and married Harold Schnitzer (1923–2011), who worked at Schnitzer Steel Industries before founding Harsch Investment Properties in 1950. The couple had one son, Jordan, in 1951. Jordan later served as president of Harsch and on the boards of several arts organizations; he also became an art collector and is the namesake of the Jordan Schnitzer Museum of Art, located on the University of Oregon campus.

== Philanthropy ==
Between 1993 and 2011, Arlene and Howard donated more than $80 million, helping to establish institutions such as the Harold Schnitzer Diabetes Health Center (2007) at the Oregon Health & Science University and expand the Portland Art Museum. Expansions for the Portland Art Museum included the Center for Northwest Art and curatorial and awards program; their private collection of pre-Han and Han ceramics led to the creation of the Arlene and Harold Schnitzer Collection of Early Chinese Art and the endowed position, Curator of Asian Art. She and Harold advanced artistic participation and representation of minorities; they were instrumental in launching the careers of artists including Robert Colescott and Marita Dingus.

In 2007, Arlene contributed $5,000 to the Portland Art Center. Harold Schnitzer died in 2011; he and Arlene were married for 62 years. In 2013, in memory of her husband, Arlene donated $2.3 million to Portland State University for the construction of a three-story glass tower at Lincoln Hall. Both Arlene and Harold attended high school in Lincoln Hall. Arlene Schnitzer herself died in Portland on April 4, 2020, at the age of 91.

Harold and Arlene also funded Jewish studies programs at the University of Oregon and Portland State University. The couple also supported cultural institutions in the San Francisco Bay Area and Palm Springs, California, where they resided part-time.

== Fountain Gallery ==
Schnitzer founded and directed the Fountain Gallery, together with her mother Helen Director, and a friend Edna Brigham. They established Fountain in Portland to showcase artists in the Pacific Northwest. The Fountain has been called Portland's "first serious" art gallery.

== Legacy ==
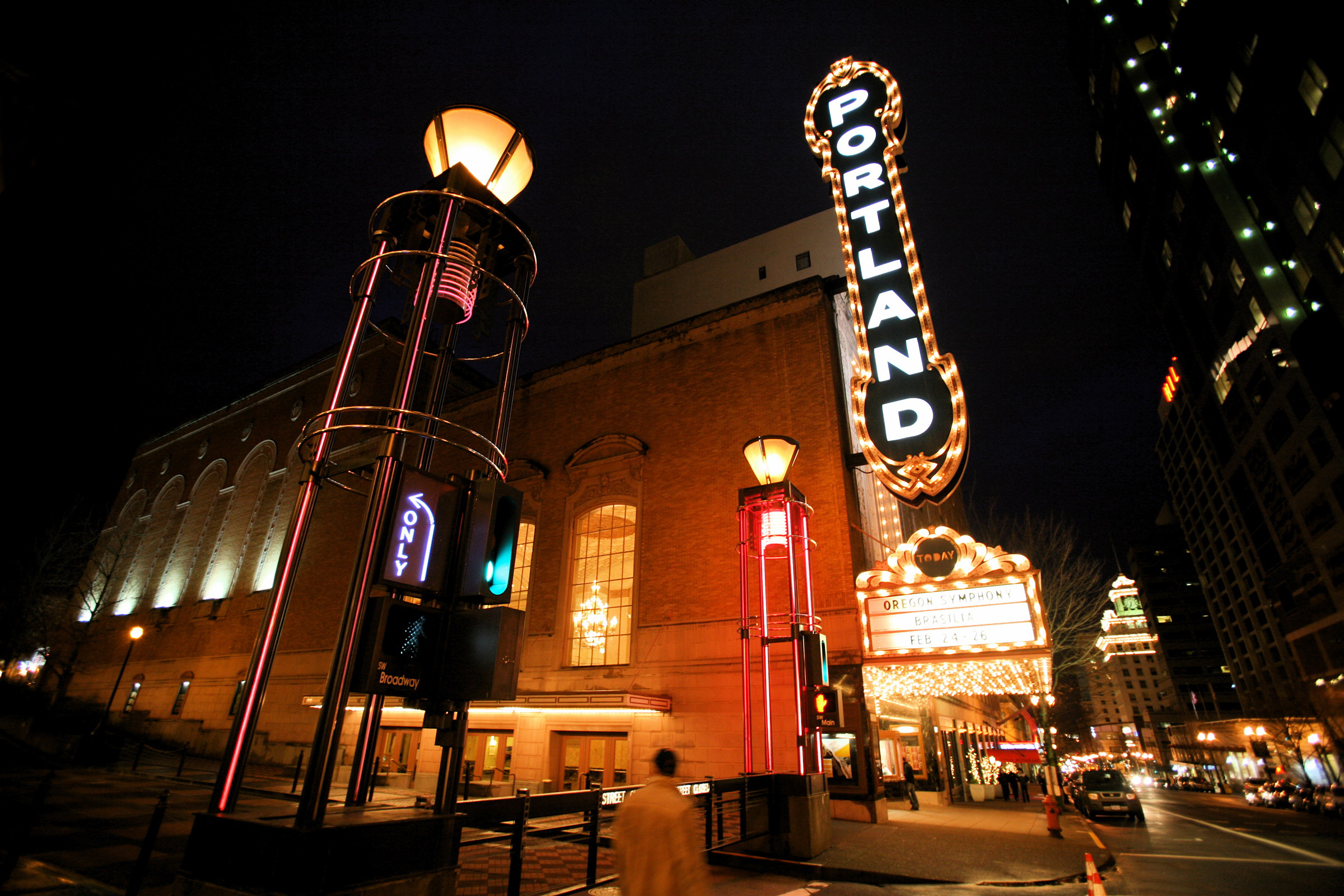
Schnitzer is the namesake of Portland's Arlene Schnitzer Concert Hall

Schnitzer is the namesake of the Arlene Schnitzer Concert Hall, a performing arts center located in downtown Portland. The Portland Art Museum created an honor called the Arlene Schnitzer Prize, which recognizes young artists whose work exhibit "great promise". In 2012, the exhibition "Provenance: In Honor of Arlene Schnitzer" featuring works by Pacific Northwest artists opened at the Jordan Schnitzer Museum of Art; the works were selected from the Arlene and Harold Schnitzer Art Collection and were displayed at the museum's Schnitzer Gallery of American Art.

== See also ==
- Director Park, named for Schnitzer's parents
- List of American Jews
