= Max Patterson Memorial City Park =

Public park in Gladstone, Oregon, U.S.

- Location within Oregon
- Location: Gladstone, Oregon, United States
- Coordinates: 45°22′58″N 122°35′26″W

Max Patterson Memorial City Park is a public park in Gladstone, Oregon, United States.

== History ==
In June 2020, more than 150 people attended a rally at the park in support of the Black Lives Matter movement.
