= Cross Park =

Public park in Gladstone, Oregon, U.S.

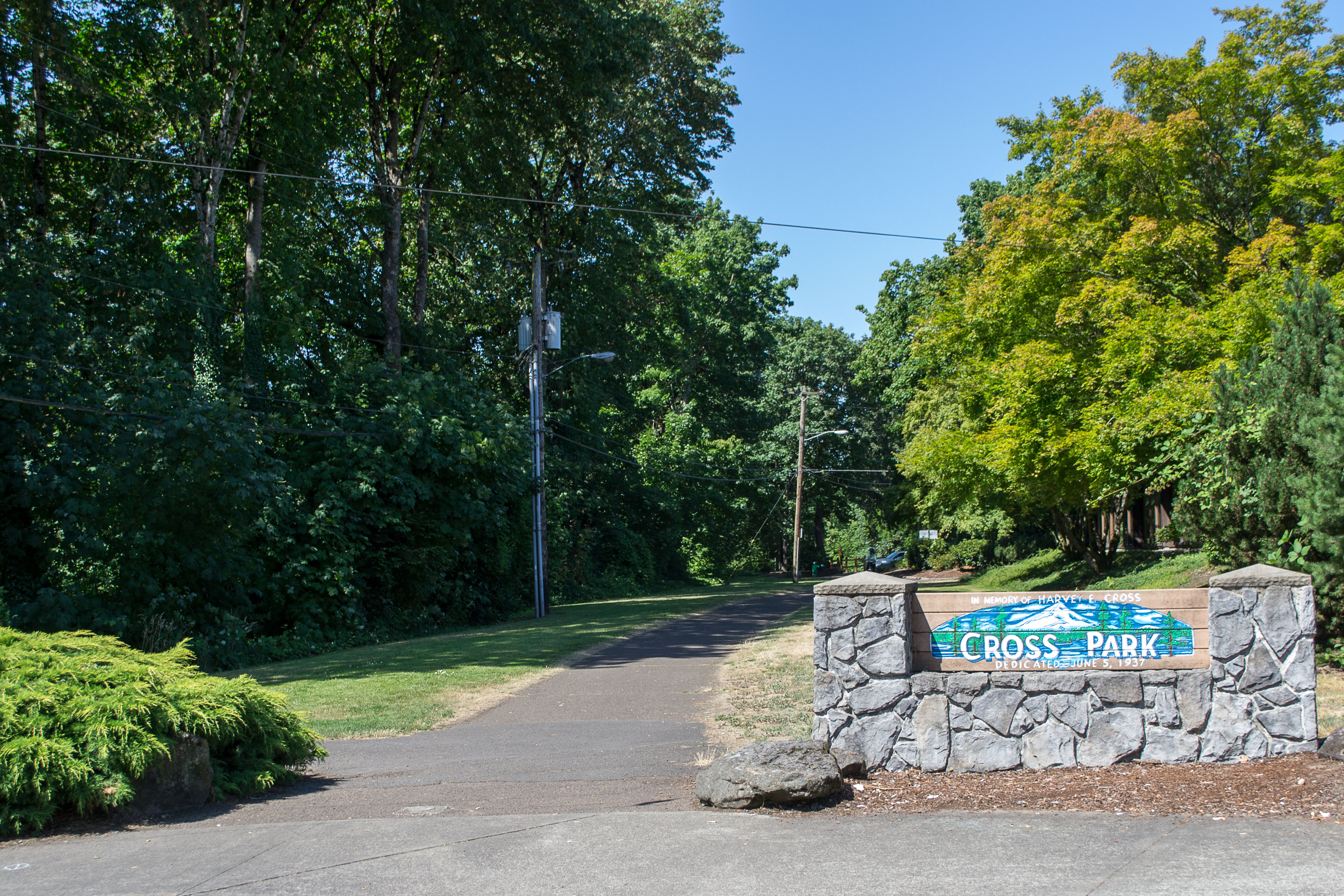
- An entrance to the park in 2013

- Location within Oregon
- Location: Gladstone, Oregon, United States
- Coordinates: 45°22′44″N 122°35′12″W

Cross Park is a public park in Gladstone, Oregon, United States. The park is sometimes used for cliff-jumping.
