= Radius Recycling =

American scrap recycling and steel manufacturing company

Radius Recycling, Inc.
- Formerly: Alaska Junk Company; Schnitzer Steel Industries
- Type: Subsidiary
- Industry: Steel
- Founded: 1906; 120 years ago
- Founder: Sam Schnitzer
- Headquarters: Portland, Oregon, U.S.
- Key people: Marc Hathhorn (CEO)
- Products: Steel; Rebar
- Owner: Toyota Tsusho
- Subsidiaries: Pick-n-Pull; Cascade Steel
- Website: radiusrecycling.com

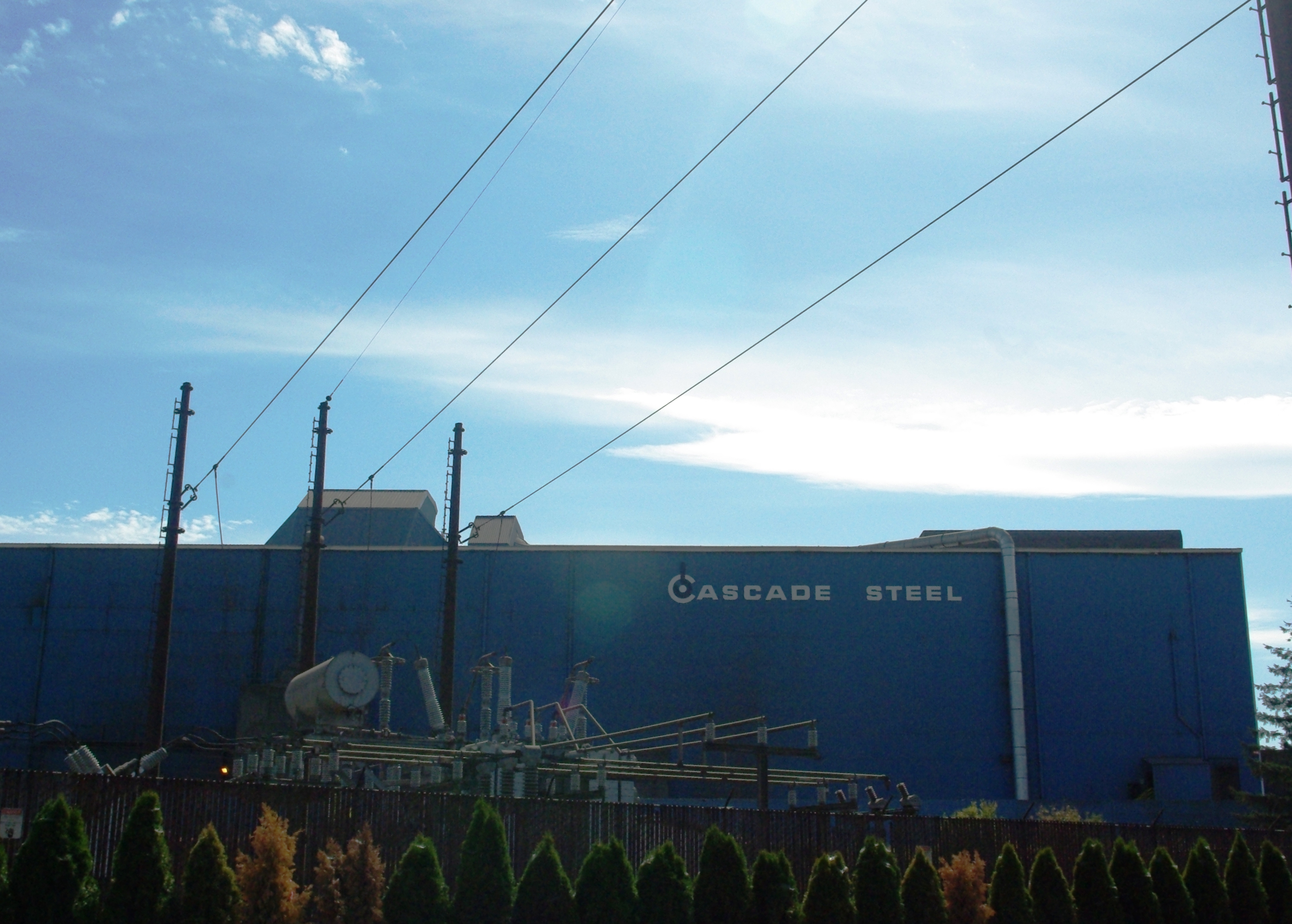
Cascade Steel mill in McMinnville, Oregon

Radius Recycling, Inc. (formerly Schnitzer Steel Industries) is a scrap recycling and steel manufacturing company headquartered in Portland, Oregon, United States. The company operates auto parts recycling, metal recycling, and steel manufacturing with locations in 26 states and two Canadian provinces, as well as Puerto Rico. The company recycles vehicles, rail cars, home appliances, industrial machinery, and scrap. The company has 103 recycling facilities including the Pick-n-Pull auto parts recycling chain with 50 locations and 53 metals recycling facilities. Steel manufacturing is through the Cascade Steel Rolling Mills plant in McMinnville, Oregon. The company was acquired by Toyota Tsusho in July 2025.

== History ==
Former logo

The company was founded as Alaska Junk Company by Russian immigrant Sam Schnitzer in 1906 as a one-person scrap metal recycler. Between 1947 and 1950, his son Harold Schnitzer worked at the company.

In 1984, the company bought Cascade Steel Rolling Mills, who operated a steel mill in McMinnville, Oregon. Schnitzer purchased eight service centers from U.S. Steel in 1986 for its Metra Steel subsidiary. In 1993, Schnitzer Steel became a public company via an initial public offering.

In January 2003, the company acquired Pick-n-Pull, a chain of automobile scrap yards where consumers can obtain autoparts from scrapped vehicles.

In October 2005, it acquired GreenLeaf Auto Recyclers, which was sold in 2009, and Regional Recycling, a metals recycling business with 10 locations in the Southeastern United States.

In December 2006, the company acquired Advanced Recycling.

In December 2007, the U.S. Securities and Exchange Commission charged former chairman and CEO Robert Philip for violating bribery laws as part of the Foreign Corrupt Practices Act in relation to dealings with Chinese steel mills.

Tamara Lundgren became the chief executive officer, and John Carter became chairman in November 2008.

In January 2010, the Schnitzer family sold their shares such that their ownership in the company fell below 20%.

In April 2010, the company acquired Golden Recycling & Salvage, a recycling company in Billings, Montana.

In January 2011, the company acquired State Line Scrap, a recycling company in Attleboro, Massachusetts. In February 2011, it acquired Ferrill's Auto Parts of Seattle.

In 2013, the company moved its headquarters to the KOIN Tower in downtown Portland, Oregon.

The company changed its name to Radius Recycling in July 2023. The company stated that the name change was intended to reflect its role in the circular economy and broader emphasis on recycling outside of steel.

In July 2025, Radius Recycling was acquired by Toyota Tsusho America, a subsidiary of the Toyota Tsusho Corporation, for approximately $1.3 billion. Radius Recycling became a wholly owned subsidiary following the transaction.

In September 2025, Tamara Lundgren stepped down as CEO of Radius Recycling after 17 years in the role. She was succeeded by Marc Hathhorn, who previously served as Executive Vice President and Chief Operating Officer at the company.

== See also ==
- List of companies based in Oregon
- List of steel producers
