= Gladstone High School (Oregon) =

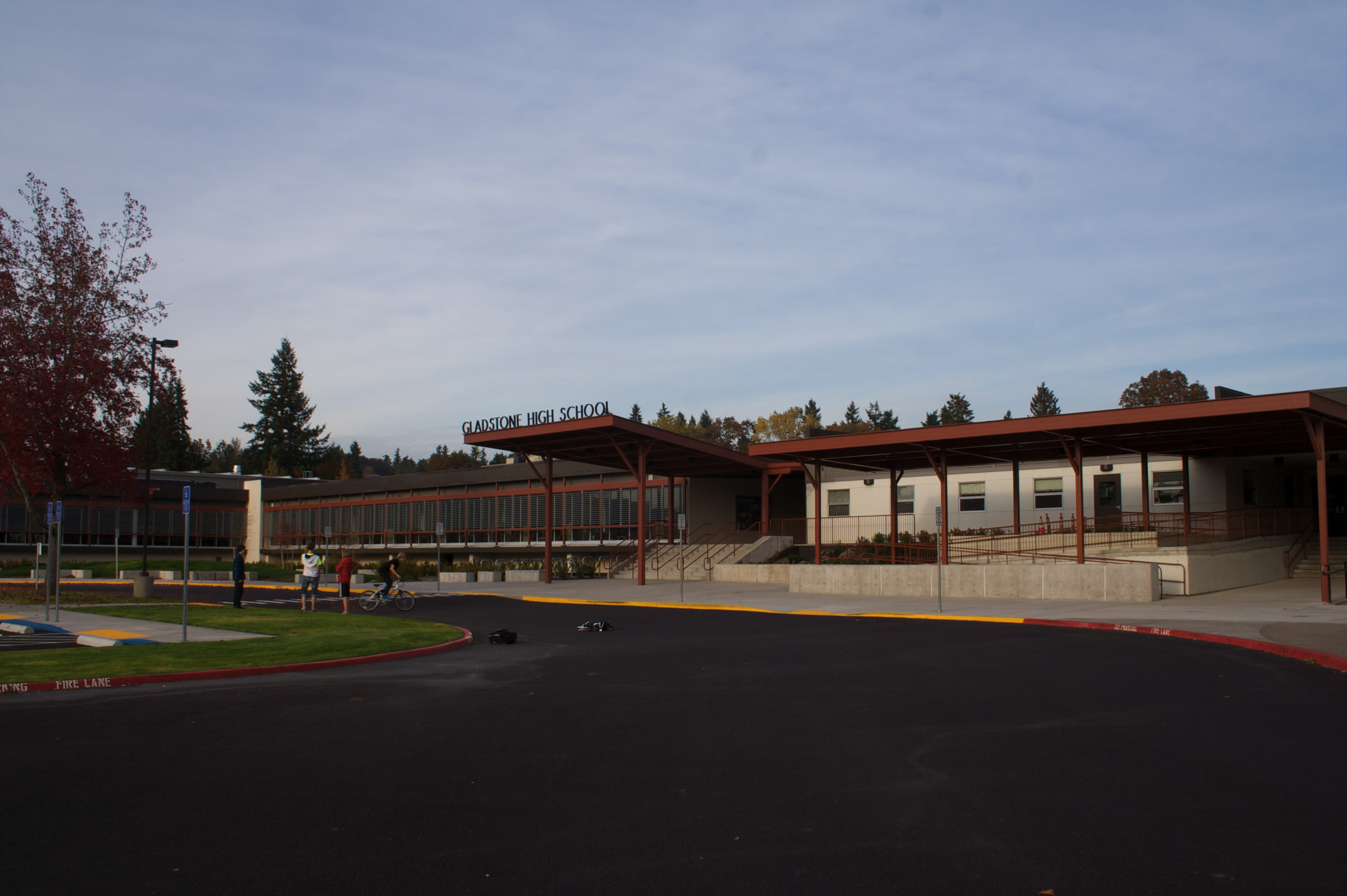

Location
- 18800 Portland Ave; Gladstone, Clackamas, Oregon 97027; United States; 45.387333°N 122.597702°W

Information
- Type: Public
- Established: 1966
- School district: Gladstone School District
- Principal: Amy Mikesell
- Teaching staff: 27.16 (FTE)
- Grades: 9-12
- Enrollment: 571 (2023–2024)
- Student to teacher ratio: 21.02
- Colors: Beaver orange and Black
- Athletics conference: OSAA 4A-2 Tri Valley Conference
- Mascot: Gladiator
- Team name: Gladiators
- Feeder schools: Kraxberger Middle School
- Website: Gladstone High School Homepage

Gladstone High School (GHS) is a public high school in Gladstone, Oregon, United States. It is one of the smallest public high schools in the Portland area.

== Construction renovations ==
A bond was passed for the Gladstone School District in the November 2006 general election. The cost of the construction at GHS is estimated at $26,901,487.29 The money has been used to expand the cafeteria, fix leaks, build a new science and technology center, and complete various other projects.

== Academics ==
In 1987, Gladstone High School was honored in the Blue Ribbon Schools Program, the highest honor a school can receive in the United States.

In 2008, 93% of the school's seniors received their high school diploma. Of 180 students, 168 graduated, 6 dropped out, 5 received a modified diploma, and 1 is still in high school.

On November 17, 2009, science teacher Kevin Zerzan was awarded a Milken Family Foundation National Educator Award, along with $25,000.

== Athletics ==
Gladstone High School athletic teams compete in the OSAA 4A-2 Tri Valley Conference.

=== State championships ===
- Baseball: 2018
- Band: 1989, 2022
- Boys Track and Field: 1982, 2000
- Boys Cross Country: 1977, 1979, 1986
- Cheerleading: 1984, 1986, 2004, 2017, 2020, 2022, 2023, 2024, 2025, 2026
- Dance/Drill: 1991, 1993, 1994, 1998
- Football: 1971, 1972, 1978, 2014
- Girls Soccer: 2009, 2011, 2012
- Girls Track and Field: 1996, 1997, 1998, 2012, 2013
- Girls Cross Country: 1987
- Volleyball: 1980, 1985
- Wrestling: 1976, 1979, 1982

== Notable alumni ==
- Matt Lindland, former Olympic wrestler and mixed martial artist
- Liz Shuler, AFL-CIO president and union leader
- Erik Wilhelm, NFL quarterback
