= Fariborz Maseeh =

Iranian-American engineer and philanthropist (born 1959)

Fariborz Maseeh (Persian: فریبرز مسیح)
- Born: Tehran, Iran
- Education: MIT Portland State University University of Texas at Austin
- Occupations: Businessman, philanthropist

Farlborz Maseeh (Persian: فریبرز مسیح : Farīborz Masīh, born 1959) is an Iranian-American engineer primarily focused on micro-electro mechanical systems. He founded IntelliSense in 1991 and sold it in 2000. He also founded the Kids Institute for Development and Advancement (KIDA), a treatment clinic and educational facility for children with autism in Irvine, California; Orbitron LP, a global macro long-short hedge fund; and the Massiah Foundation, a charitable organization where he serves as president. He was elected to the National Academy of Engineering in 2023.

== Life and career ==
=== Early life and education ===
Fariborz Maseeh was born in Tehran, Iran, and moved to Portland, Oregon, as a teenager. He graduated from Portland State University (PSU) with a Bachelor of Science in engineering and a minor in structural engineering. He then graduated from the University of Texas at Austin with a master's degree, where he conducted research in the Department of Aeronautics. Maseeh then returned to PSU and earned another master's degree in applied mathematics. He taught engineering courses at Clackamas Community College before moving to Boston to pursue a doctorate at the Massachusetts Institute of Technology.

=== Technology entrepreneur ===
IntelliSense was focused on the custom design, development, and manufacturing of MEMS devices. It was included twice in the New England Technology "Fast 50" and Forbes' "Fast 500" lists. Maseeh sold IntelliSense in 2000 and subsequently joined the Corning management team, but resigned after a year.

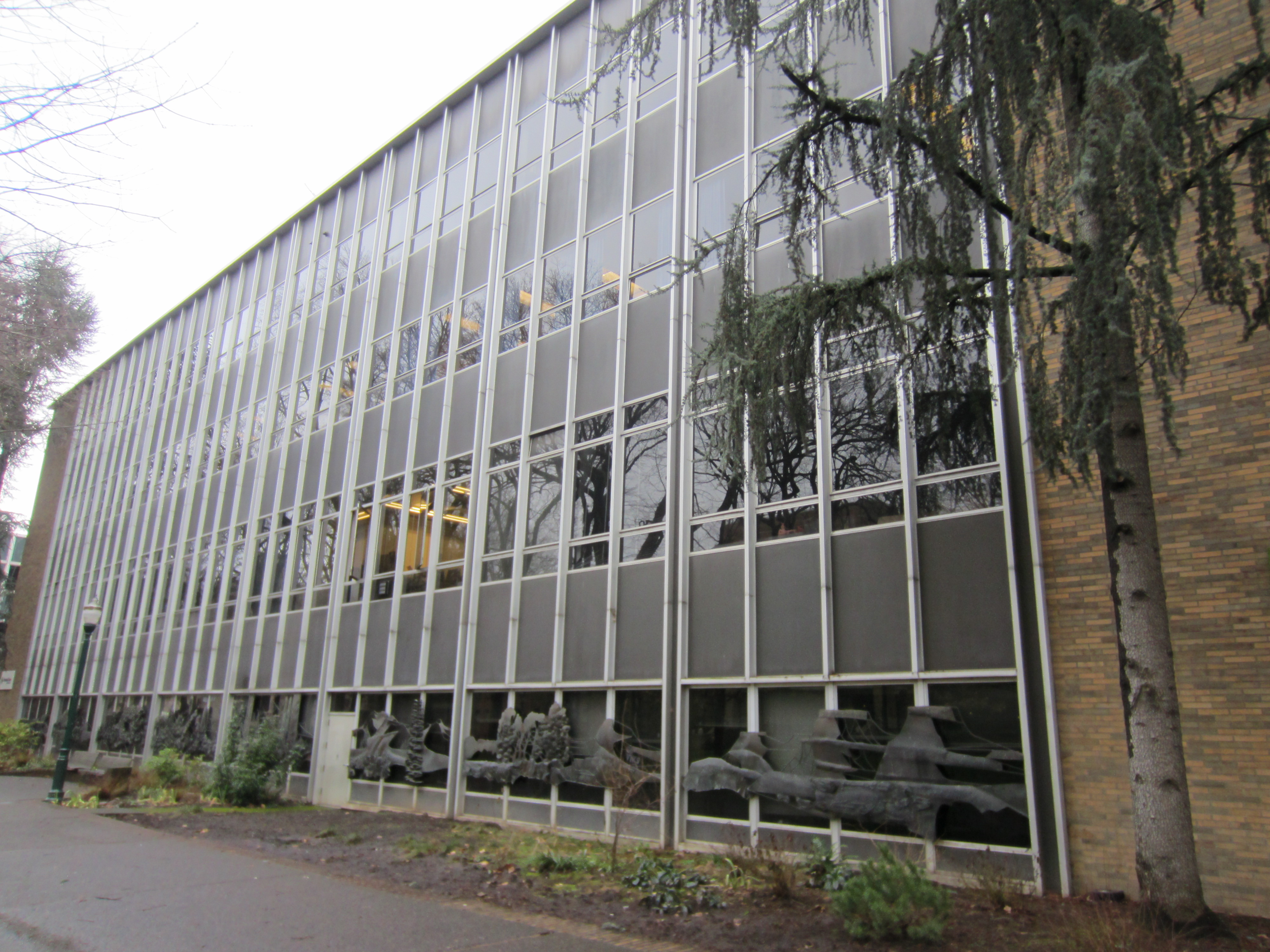
Fariborz Maseeh Hall at Portland State University

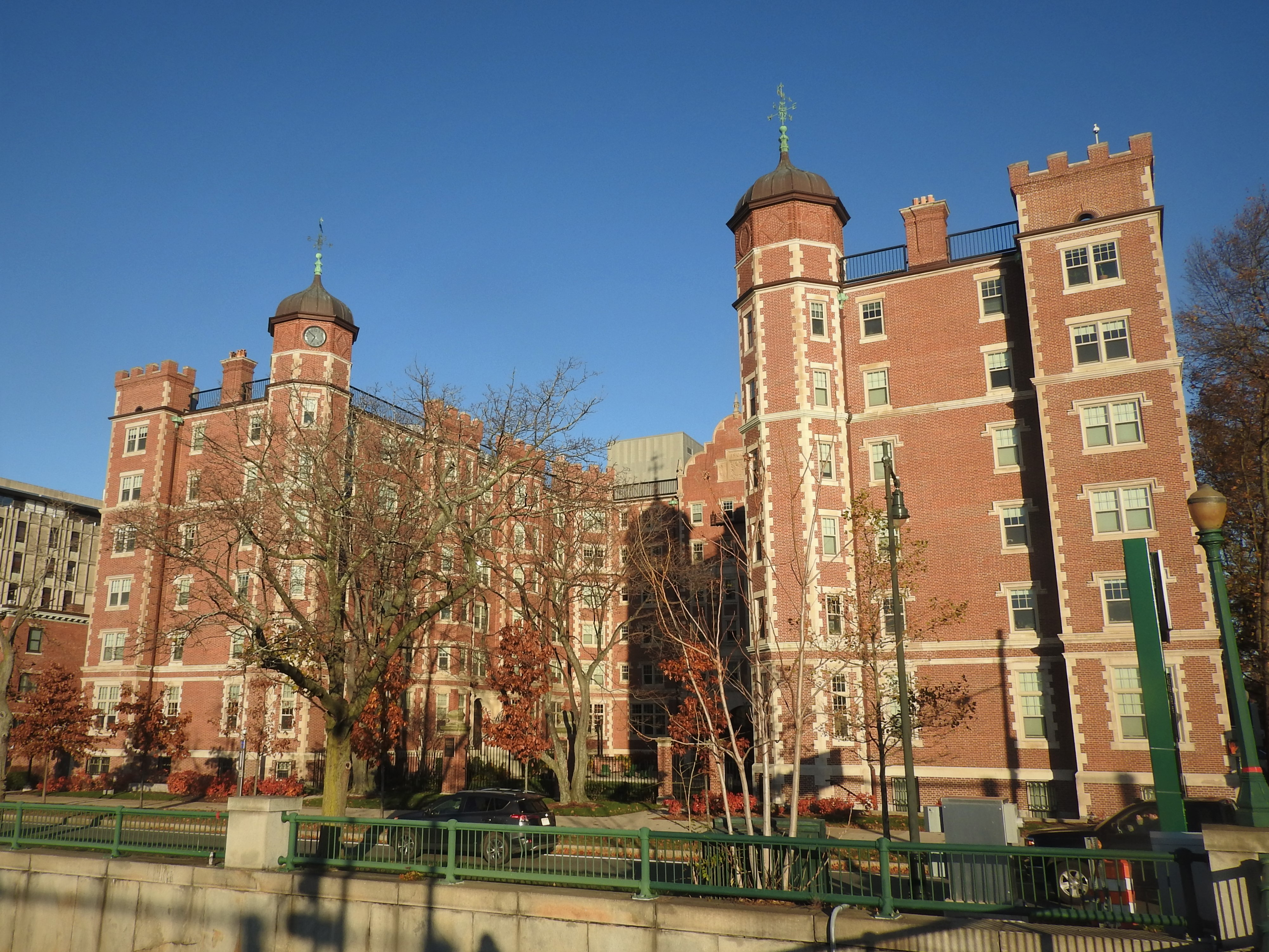
Maseeh Hall, Massachusetts Institute of Technology

=== Community service ===
Maseeh has served on numerous boards, including those of the MIT Corporation and Harvard Medical School Board of Fellows. In April 2021, he was elected to the Caltech Board of Trustees. He also serves on engineering advisory boards at the University of Southern California Viterbi School of Engineering, the Massachusetts Institute of Technology, and Portland State University.

=== Philanthropy ===
Maseeh is involved in philanthropy, primarily through the Massiah Foundation. The foundation utilizes the concept of venture philanthropy, focusing on investing in entities with the potential for lasting social impact.

== See also ==
- Maseeh College of Engineering and Computer Science
- Iranian Americans
- List of Iranian Americans
