= Gladstone, Oregon =

Gladstone
- City
- Gladstone, Oregon
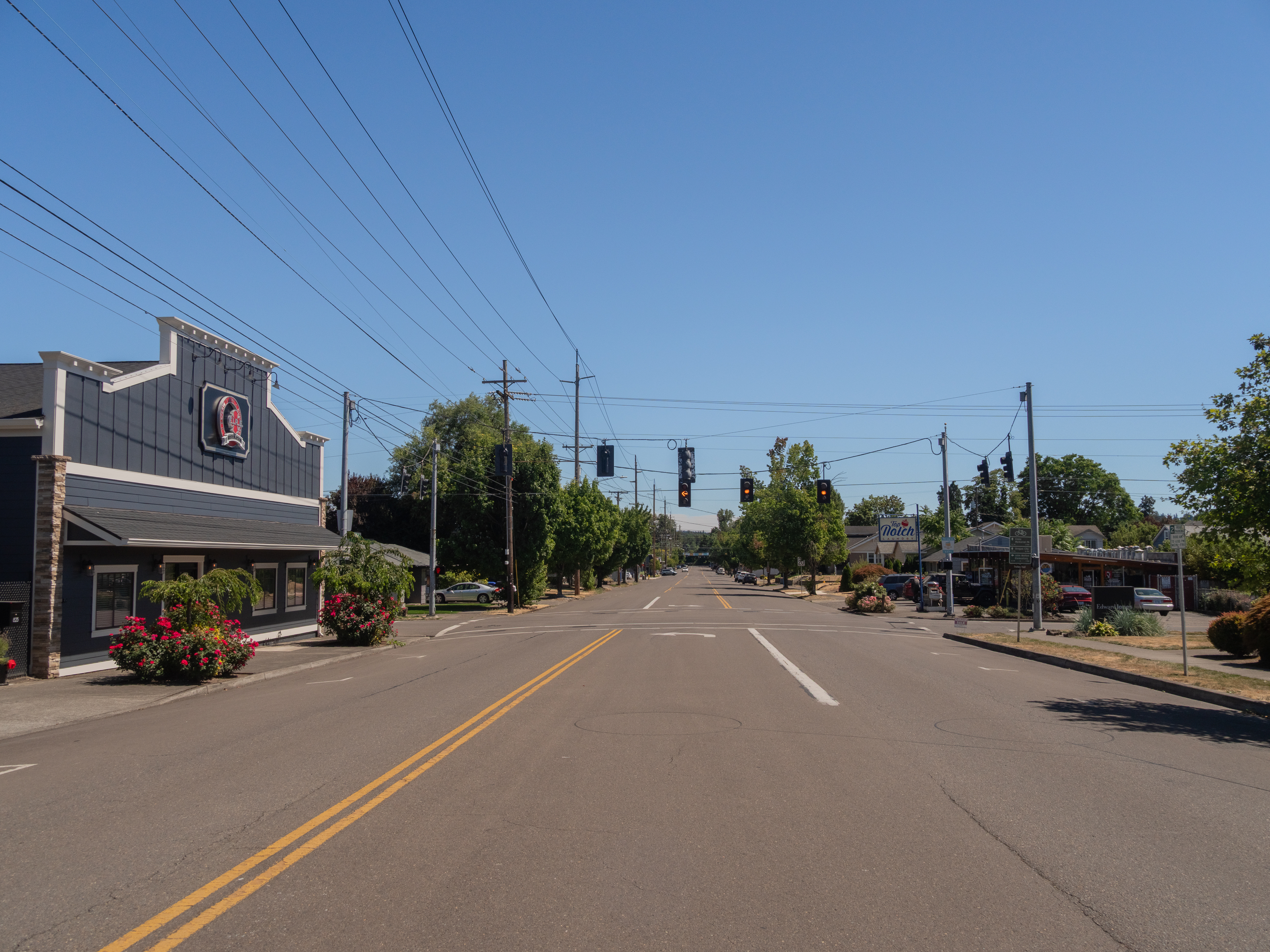
- A view looking south down Portland Avenue, the main street in the city of Gladstone.

- Seal
- Motto: Home of the Pow Wow Tree
- Location in Oregon
- Coordinates: 45°22′49″N 122°35′41″W
- Country: United States
- State: Oregon
- County: Clackamas
- Incorporated: 1911

Government
  - Mayor: Michael Milch

Area
  - Total: 2.49 sq mi (6.45 km^{2})
  - Land: 2.40 sq mi (6.21 km^{2})
  - Water: 0.093 sq mi (0.24 km^{2})
- Elevation: 89 ft (27 m)

Population (2020)
  - Total: 12,017
  - Density: 5,011.2/sq mi (1,934.82/km^{2})
- Time zone: UTC-8 (Pacific)
  - Summer (DST): UTC-7 (Pacific)
- ZIP code: 97027
- Area code: 503
- FIPS code: 41-29000
- Website: City of Gladstone

Gladstone is a city located in Clackamas County, Oregon, United States. The population was 12,017 at the 2020 United States census. Gladstone is an approximately 4-square-mile (10 km^{2}) suburban community, about 12 miles (19 km) south of Portland at the confluence of the Clackamas and Willamette rivers.

Gladstone has held several important cultural and social events, hosting both the inaugural Clackamas County Fair and the Oregon State Fair, before both were moved to more spacious locations. Both Secretary of State William Jennings Bryan and presidential candidate Theodore Roosevelt gave public speeches in the city.

== History ==
=== Clackamas Indians ===
Prior to European settlement, there were several Native American groups living in the area that was to become Gladstone.

In 1804, President Thomas Jefferson commissioned the Lewis and Clark Expedition to explore the Louisiana Territory and beyond. Although the expedition passed only near the Gladstone – Oregon City locality on their way to and from the Pacific Ocean, via the Columbia River, natives such as the Kalapuya and the Clackamas people told them about the area.

In the subsequent years, successive waves of explorers and traders would introduce epidemics of cholera and smallpox, which would take a heavy toll on the native peoples and contributed to a substantial reduction in population.

As Oregon City was founded and European settlers began moving to the area, they petitioned their governments to remove the local natives from the land, so that the settlers could use it for farming and housing. The government allocated a reservation for the natives and re-appropriated Gladstone for redevelopment.

As of 2014, the only extant remnant of the bygone natives is a large maple tree called the Pow Wow Tree, which is listed as an Oregon Heritage Tree. The tree still stands at Clackamas Boulevard, and is said to have marked the place where the different native tribes, mainly Clackamas and Multnomahs, met to make trading agreements, settle community affairs, and conduct wedding ceremonies. In 1860, the Pow-Wow Tree was the location set for the first Clackamas County Fair. The following year, it was used as a parade ring for the first Oregon State Fair and marked the entrance. In 1937, the tree itself was celebrated with the Gladstone Pow-Wow Festival.

=== Early homesteaders ===
The earliest homesteads in the area were recipients of the Donation Land Claim Act. The Cason and the Rinearson families were the first settlers to receive their donation land claims in Gladstone. Peter M. Rinearson and his family owned the land between Jennings Lodge and the Clackamas River, and between the Willamette River and Portland Avenue. Fendal Cason, who came to Oregon in 1843 and would go on to serve on in the Oregon Territorial Legislature, owned an area of equal size east of Portland Avenue.

=== Unsuccessful early townships ===
Before Gladstone was formally founded, several small settlements were established in its vicinity. However, due to various natural disasters, such as fires and floods, few survived to become incorporated cities of today.

One such community was Linn City (originally named Robin's Nest). Settled in 1843 by Robert Moore, Robert himself built four flour and lumber mills along the banks of the Willamette. Warehouses, homes, and mills were steadily added until 1861, when a fire destroyed several of the buildings. Efforts at rebuilding the small town entirely ceased when the Great Flood of 1862 struck, wiping out the remaining buildings.

Another such ill-fated settlement was Canemah, located near the Willamette Falls. Canemah prospered until 1861, when the same great flood swept most of the town over the falls. Even after reconstruction, much of the town's importance to river commerce ended in 1873 with completion of the Willamette Falls Locks. Ships no longer needed to dock and unload goods and passengers for portage around the falls. The remaining town officially survived until 1929, when it was annexed to Oregon City.

=== Founding ===
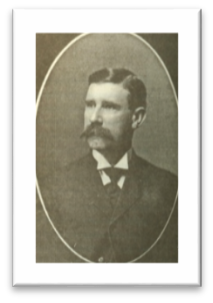
Judge Harvey Cross (1856–1927), founder of Gladstone

Gladstone was founded by Judge Harvey Cross in 1889, and formally incorporated on January 10, 1911. It was named after the UK Prime Minister William Ewart Gladstone. Judge Cross laid out the city's first streets. Cross' home was built in the late 1840s by Fendal Cason, and Cross purchased it in 1862. The Cason-Cross House later became Cochran Mortuary. Currently, Mr. Rooter, a plumbing service, occupies the space. There is also a small park named after Cross, located at the same place one of the Indian tribes made its camp.

=== Chautauqua movement ===
In 1894, the Chautauqua movement made its way to Gladstone. Judge Cross established a fifty-year lease of Gladstone Park for this event after he was convinced by Oregon City author Eva Emery Dye that doing so would be a boon to the city and its people. Beginning on July 24–26, 1894, the newly formed Willamette Valley Chautauqua Association held an annual summer assembly that offered performances, lectures, and concerts. This event would recur annually, until Gladstone's Chautauqua Park grew to be the third-largest permanent Chautauqua assembly park in the United States.

In 1896, William Jennings Bryan drew a crowd of 6,000 to Gladstone's then 78-acre (32 ha) Chautauqua park to hear him give his popular lecture "The Prince of Peace", which stressed that Christian theology, through both individual and group morality, was a solid foundation for peace and equality.

With the advent of radio, improved transportation and the appearance of traveling vaudeville acts in Portland, attendance at the Chautauqua began to dwindle. In 1927, the Willamette Valley Chautauqua Association went bankrupt. Judge Cross died on August 7, 1927, and shortly thereafter, Gladstone Park, including its buildings and Chautauqua Lake, were sold to the Western Oregon Conference of Seventh-day Adventists.

== Geography ==
According to the United States Census Bureau, the city has an area of 2.48 square miles (6.42 km^{2}).

=== Adjacent communities ===
The city of Gladstone is immediately bordered by the following communities, listed in descending order of population:

- Oregon City, the county seat of Clackamas County, sits to the south, almost entirely separated by the Clackamas River
- West Linn, to the west, is delineated by the Willamette River.
- Oak Grove, a census-designated place and unincorporated area, abuts Lake Oswego to the west, Milwaukie to the north, and Jennings lodge to the south.
- Jennings Lodge, a census-designated place and unincorporated area, runs between Oak Grove and Gladstone.
- Oatfield, a census-designated place and unincorporated area similar to Jennings Lodge, exists between Milwaukie, to the north, and Gladstone, to the south.
- Clackamas, to the northeast, an unincorporated area and former census-designated place, resides within greater Clackamas County.
- Johnson City, a very small incorporated city of approximately 500 residents, is northeast of Gladstone. (See also the similar city of Maywood Park, Oregon.) In 1968, the 45-acre (18 ha) city tried unsuccessfully to annex to Gladstone.

Although the above cities are generally considered part of the much larger Portland metropolitan area, Gladstone, Oregon City, West Linn, and Milwaukie each possess the population and production of a micropolis in their own right and this relatively dense sub-region contains a combined population exceeding 100,000 people.

Despite Gladstone's proximity to the city of Milwaukie, at no point do the two share political boundaries.

=== Major thoroughfares and street grid ===
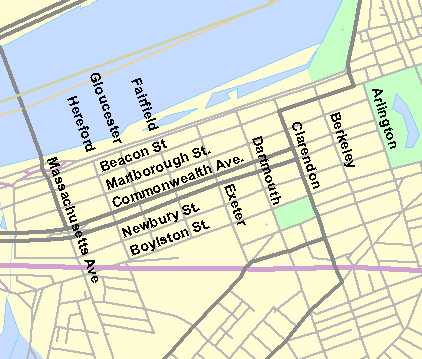
This same set of Gladstone street names is used for the north–south main streets in the center of Back Bay, Boston, but the origin of any connection to Gladstone is unknown.

Being bordered by rivers on two sides, there are only two primary thoroughfares to and from the city. Interstate 205 runs north–south along the eastern edge of the city, while McLoughlin Boulevard (Oregon Route 99E) runs north–south through the western side.

Taken at the suggestion of surveyor Sidney Smyth, Judge Harvey Cross decided to name a number of Gladstone streets after American colleges (e.g., University of California, Berkeley, Cornell University) and a number of United Kingdom dukes, earls, and universities (e.g., University of Exeter, Earl of Dartmouth, Earl of Clarendon). Portland Avenue, Gladstone's main street, is the only divergence from this naming convention. Named for the 1893 Interurban Electric Streetcar line that once traversed the street, it once transported passengers between Gladstone and Portland.

=== Climate ===
The annual average temperature for Gladstone is 54.4 °F (12.4 °C), while the annual average precipitation is 46.3 inches (1,180 mm). According to the Köppen Climate Classification system, Gladstone has a warm-summer Mediterranean climate, abbreviated Csb on climate maps.

== Demographics ==
Historical population
Census	Pop.	Note	%±
1920	1,069		—
1930	1,348		26.1%
1940	1,629		20.8%
1950	2,434		49.4%
1960	3,854		58.3%
1970	6,254		62.3%
1980	9,500		51.9%
1990	10,152		6.9%
2000	11,438		12.7%
2010	11,497		0.5%
2020	12,017		4.5%

=== 2020 census ===
As of the 2020 census, Gladstone had a population of 12,017. The median age was 40.5 years. 19.8% of residents were under the age of 18 and 18.0% of residents were 65 years of age or older. For every 100 females there were 96.8 males, and for every 100 females age 18 and over there were 94.2 males age 18 and over.

100.0% of residents lived in urban areas, while 0% lived in rural areas.

There were 4,707 households in Gladstone, of which 29.2% had children under the age of 18 living in them. Of all households, 45.1% were married-couple households, 18.0% were households with a male householder and no spouse or partner present, and 27.5% were households with a female householder and no spouse or partner present. About 25.3% of all households were made up of individuals and 12.4% had someone living alone who was 65 years of age or older.

There were 4,943 housing units, of which 4.8% were vacant. Among occupied housing units, 60.2% were owner-occupied and 39.8% were renter-occupied. The homeowner vacancy rate was 0.9% and the rental vacancy rate was 6.2%.

Racial composition as of the 2020 census
Race	Number	Percent
White	9,775	81.3%
Black or African American	122	1.0%
American Indian and Alaska Native	99	0.8%
Asian	257	2.1%
Native Hawaiian and Other Pacific Islander	54	0.4%
Some other race	463	3.9%
Two or more races	1,247	10.4%
Hispanic or Latino (of any race)	1,200	10.0%

=== 2010 census ===
As of the census of 2010, there were 11,497 people, 4,540 households, and 3,009 families residing in the city. The population density was 4,790.4 inhabitants per square mile (1,849.6/km^{2}). There were 4,779 housing units at an average density of 1,991.3 per square mile (768.8/km^{2}). The racial makeup of the city was 89.2% White, 0.9% African American, 1.0% Native American, 1.6% Asian, 0.4% Pacific Islander, 3.4% from other races, and 3.6% from two or more races. Hispanic or Latino of any race were 8.7% of the population.

== Arts and culture ==
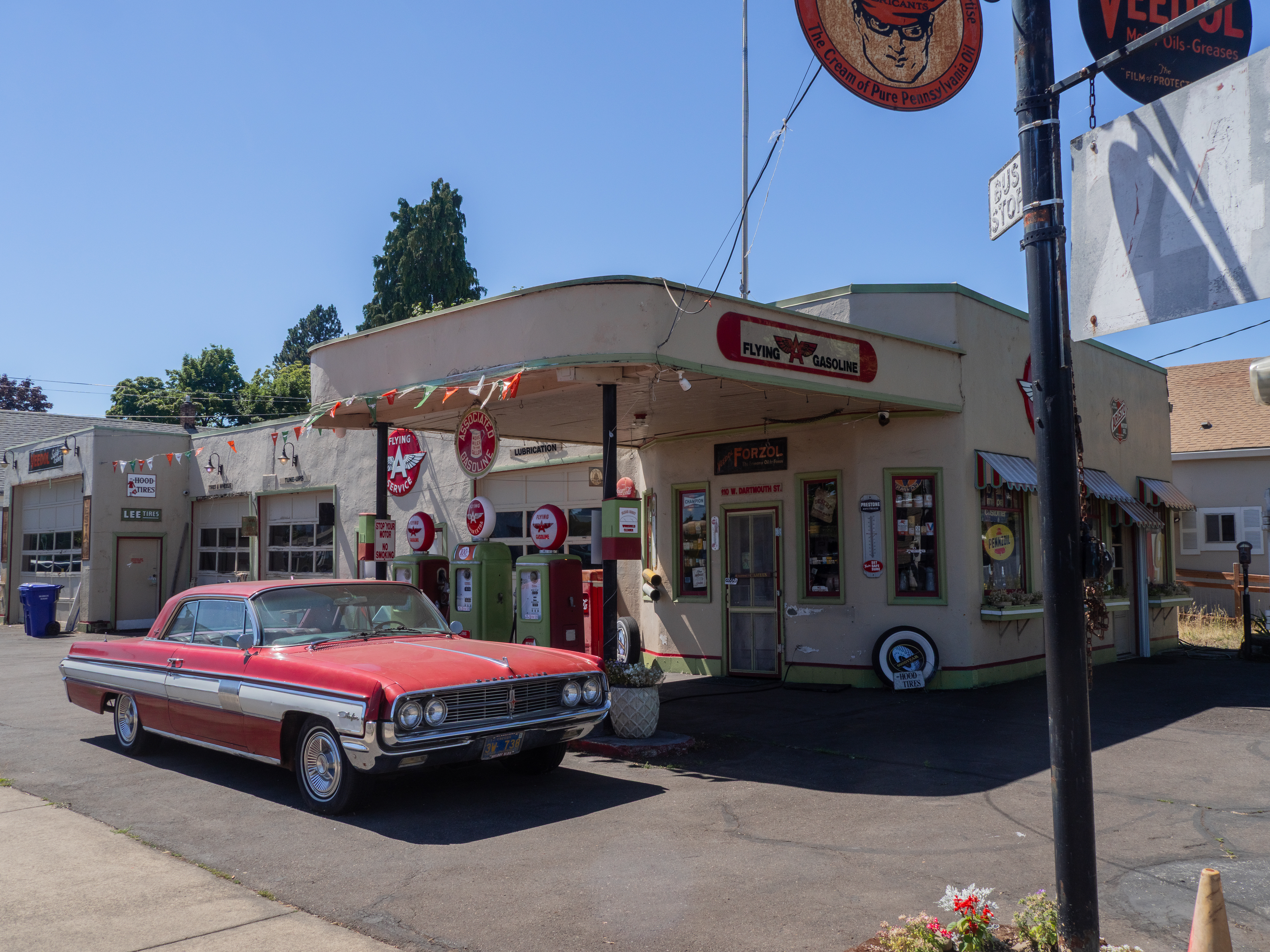
An old time gas station in Gladstone.

The annual Gladstone Community Festival and parade, held the first weekend of August, commemorates Gladstone's former status as a popular Chautauqua destination. The festival is held in Max Patterson Memorial City Park. KRYP is a Spanish-language FM radio station that broadcasts from the city.

== Public services ==
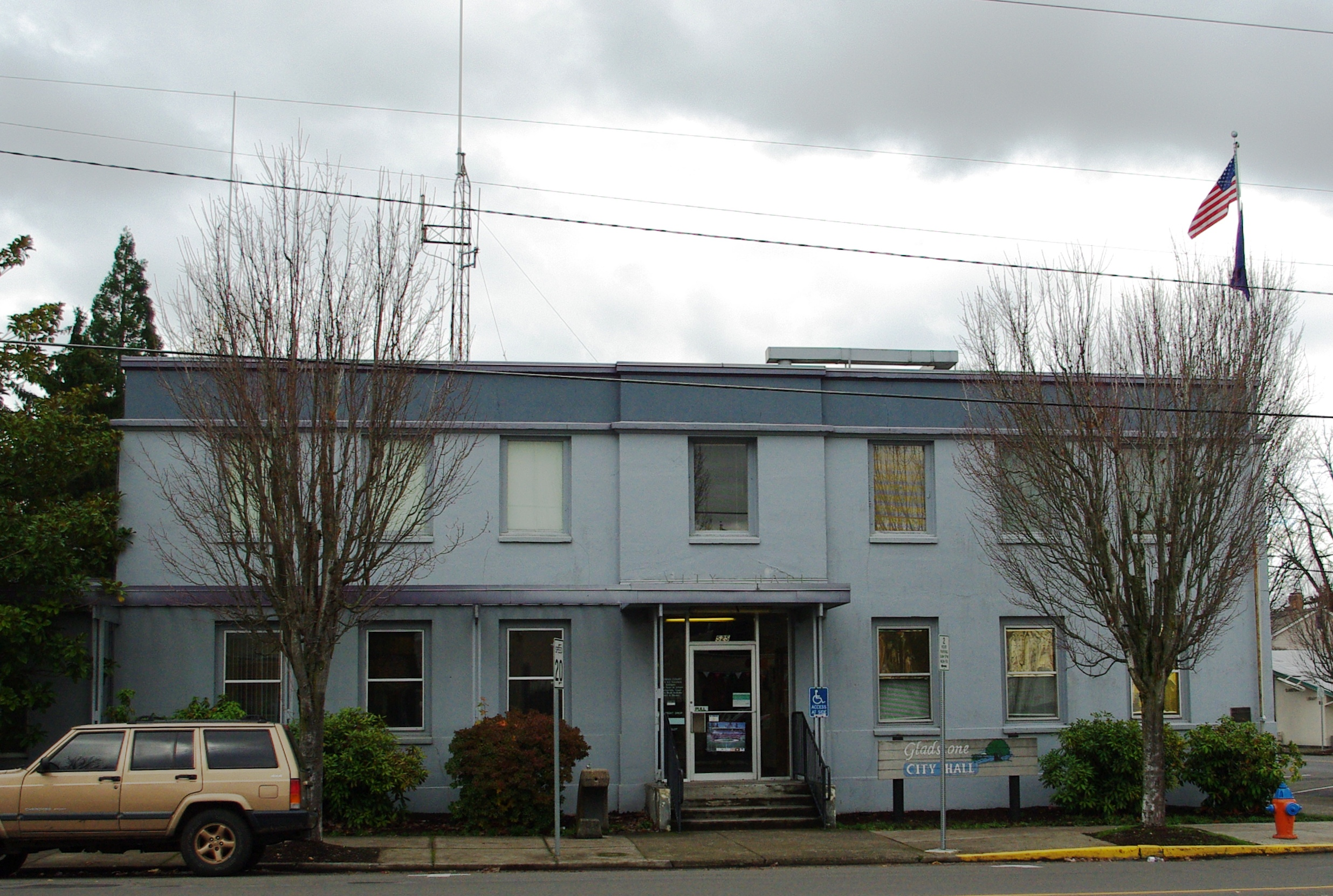
City Hall and municipal court

=== Public safety and quality of life ===
Some polling data suggests that Gladstone citizens are satisfied with city services they receive and a large majority consider Gladstone a particularly "good/excellent" place to live. Perhaps reflecting this support, the police, fire, and medical services levy renewal measures were overwhelmingly approved by voters in November 2012.

=== Schools ===
Gladstone is served by the Gladstone School District, which includes John Wetten Elementary School, Kraxberger Middle School, and Gladstone High School. In 2006, a bond was passed to allow approximately $40 million worth of construction work on the three schools. The majority (approx. $26 million) of the money was applied towards a remodel of the high school. The district later refinanced the bond, saving taxpayers over 5 percent on its total ($805,040), with savings to begin in the 2024 tax year.

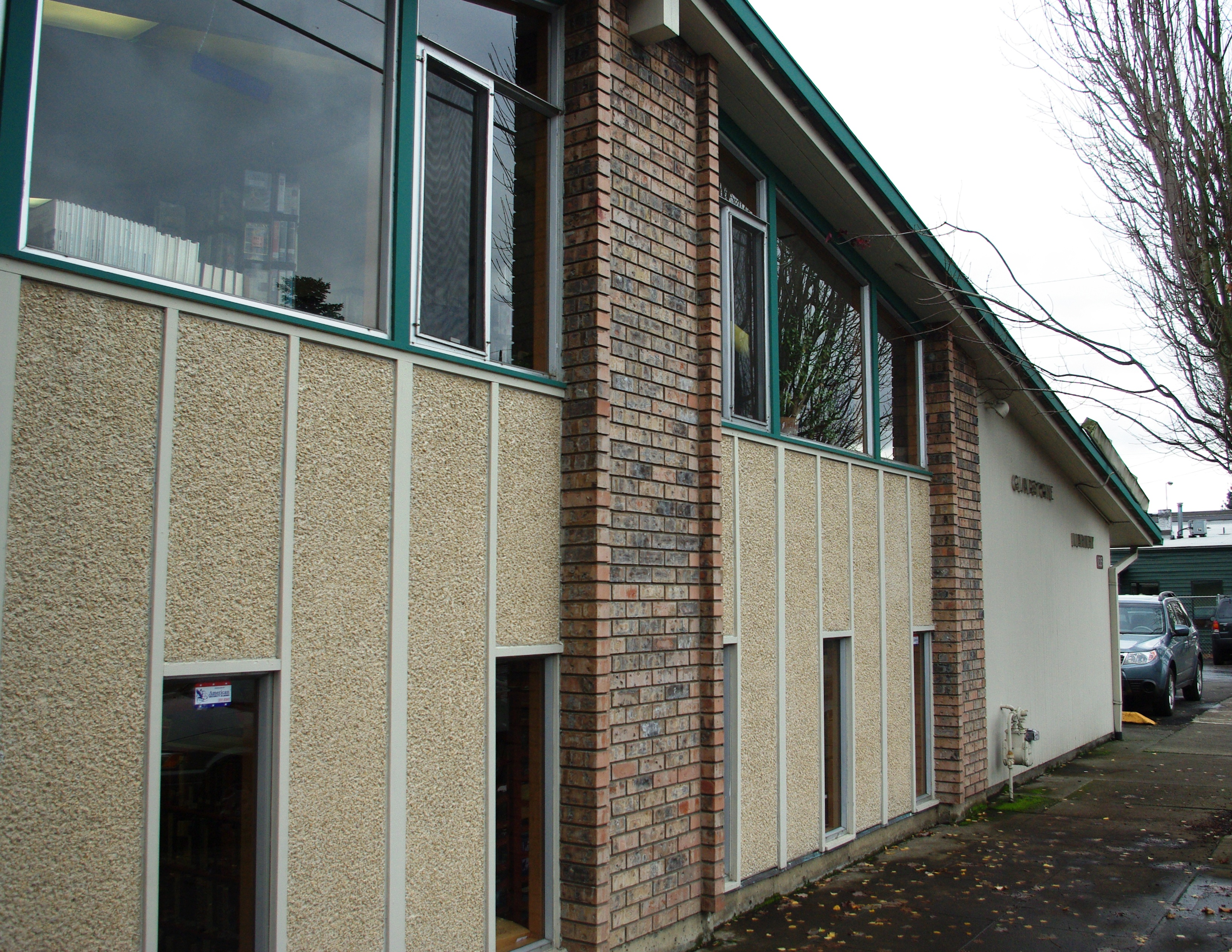
Gladstone Public Library

=== Library ===
The county operates a library in Gladstone that is part of the Library Information Network of Clackamas County. In 2012, the city council approved plans for a new $10 million library, but ballot measures backed by the group Save Gladstone blocked the financing and construction pending specific voter approval. The city then placed a new measure on the November 2014 ballot for a $6.4 million option. Plans were put on hold when supply shortages during the COVID-19 pandemic increased the cost of materials beyond budget constraints.

=== Parks ===
Despite its relatively small geographic size, the City of Gladstone recognizes 14 parks and recreational areas. Parks include: Abernethy Lane Trail, Cross Park, Dahl Beach, Dierickx Field, Gladstone Nature Park, Glen Echo Wetland, High Rocks Park, Max Patterson Memorial City Park, Meldrum Bar Park (controversial for being the only city park in the region to impose a day use fee.), Nick Shannon Park, Ridgegate Tracts, Robin Hood Park, Salty Acres Wetlands and Stocker Park.

=== Public transit ===
Gladstone is within the TriMet transportation district, and transit service in the city is provided by TriMet bus routes 32-Oatfield, 33-McLoughlin/King Road, 34-Linwood/River Road, and 79-Clackamas/Oregon City, as well as the 99-Macadam/McLoughlin rush-hour express route.

== Notable people ==
American labor activist Liz Shuler grew up in Gladstone. She went on to become Secretary-Treasurer of the AFL–CIO. She is the first woman and (as of 2009) the youngest person to hold the position of Secretary-Treasurer. Actor Clifton James grew up in the city and died there as well. James had roles in the James Bond films Live and Let Die (1973) and The Man with the Golden Gun (1974), as well as Cool Hand Luke (1967).
