= Harold Schnitzer =

American real estate developer and philanthropist

Harold J. Schnitzer
- Born: June 8, 1923
- Died: April 27, 2011 (age 87)
- Education: Massachusetts Institute of Technology
- Occupations: Real estate developer Philanthropist
- Known for: Founder of Harsch Investment Properties
- Spouse: Arlene Schnitzer
- Family: Jordan Schnitzer

Harold J. Schnitzer (June 8, 1923 – April 27, 2011) was an American businessman, civic leader, and philanthropist. Schnitzer is best remembered for having made over $80 million in charitable gifts over the course of his lifetime, including the establishment of the Harold Schnitzer Family Program in Judaic Studies at Portland State University in Portland, Oregon and at the University of Oregon.

== Biography ==
=== Early years ===
Harold Schnitzer was born in 1923 to Rose and Sam Schnitzer, ethnic Jewish émigrés from Tsarist Russia. Harold was the fifth of seven children of the couple. The elder Schnitzer was in the scrap metal business, beginning the Alaska Junk Company.

Harold anticipated entering the steel industry from an early age, studying metallurgy at Massachusetts Institute of Technology, from which he graduated in 1944.

Following graduation, Schnitzer served a stint in the U.S. Army during World War II as an ordnance specialist.

=== Career ===
Schnitzer worked the family business, Schnitzer Steel, from 1947 to 1950. He did not wish to compete with his four brothers in the company, however, so in 1950 Harold Schnitzer sold his share of the business to provide capital for a new enterprise.

The new enterprise founded was a real estate investment company known as Harsch Investment Properties. The name of the firm, Harsch, derived from the first three letters of Harold Schnitzer's first and last names.

Schnitzer began his career as a real estate developer with the purchase of an old warehouse in downtown Portland and its conversion into office space. Over the years Schnitzer's company grew to the point where it owned 130 properties with 21,000,000 square feet (2,000,000 m^{2}) of rentable commercial space in five western states, as well as more than 1,000 apartments. At the time of his death, Harsch Investment Properties employed 225 people.

=== Charitable giving ===
From 1993 until his death in 2011, Harold Schnitzer and his wife Arlene were responsible for $80 million in charitable giving to a wide range of projects. Some of these projects included the refurbishing of the Portland Art Museum, the creation of the Harold Schnitzer Diabetes Health Center at Oregon Health and Science University, the restoration of what is today known as the Arlene Schnitzer Concert Hall in Portland, and the establishment of the endowed Harold Schnitzer Program in Judaic Studies at Portland State University and the University of Oregon.

Other prominent Oregon institutions supported by the Schnitzer family through the Harold and Arlene Schnitzer CARE Foundation included the Oregon Zoo and Oregon Public Broadcasting.

Schnitzer was also a financial supporter of such cultural institutions as the Oregon Symphony, the Portland Opera, and the Oregon Ballet, in addition to various educational and social service programs. Schnitzer was also a supporter of programs within Oregon's Jewish community, including the Mittleman Jewish Community Center, the Portland Jewish Academy, and an independent and assisted living facility for elders known as Rose Schnitzer Manor.

=== Death and legacy ===
Harold Schnitzer died April 27, 2011, in Portland, Oregon, following a two-year battle with abdominal cancer.

Oregon Governor John Kitzhaber recalled of Schnitzer that "he was incredibly easy to be around. He made you feel at ease. He was powerful and wealthy yet at ease. He didn't take himself that seriously."

Schnitzer was remembered by U.S. Senator Ron Wyden as "one of those really rare individuals you call a vintage Oregonian.... who almost always says when you begin to talk to him, 'What can I do to help?'"
