= Schnitzer School of Art and Art History and Design =

Building in Portland, Oregon, U.S.

Coordinates: 45.509955°N 122.685418°W

Schnitzer School of Art + Art History + Design
- Interactive map of the Schnitzer School of Art + Art History + Design area

General information
- Status: Under construction
- Location: Portland State University, Portland, Oregon, U.S.
- Groundbreaking: September 2024
- Owner: Portland State University

Website
- www.pdx.edu/art-design/

The Schnitzer School of Art + Art History + Design is a facility under construction on the Portland State University campus in Portland, Oregon, United States. Ground broke on the project in September 2024.
