= Fariborz Maseeh Hall =

Building on the Portland State University campus in Portland, Oregon, U.S.

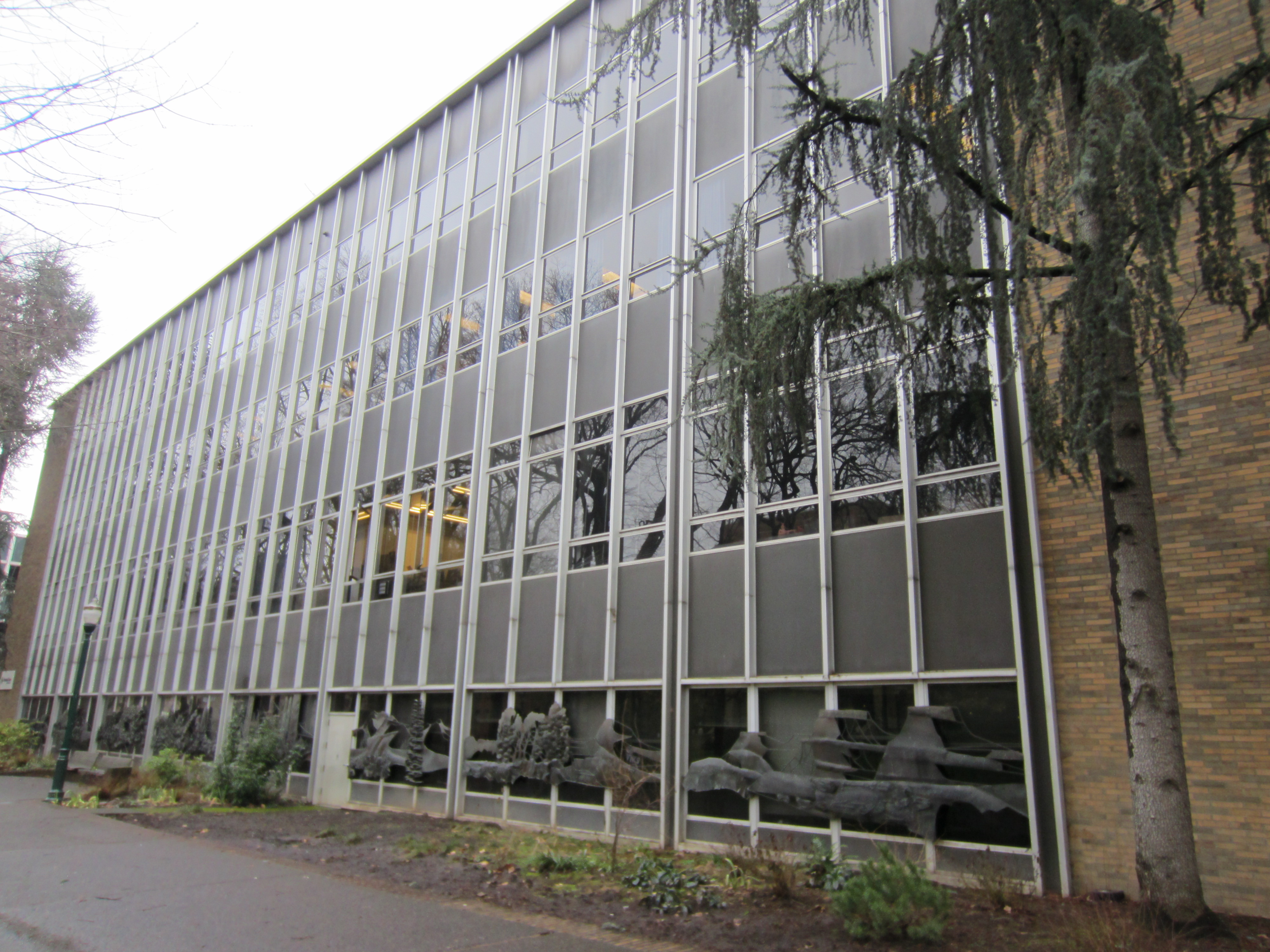
- The building's exterior in 2014

- Location within Portland, Oregon
- Former names: Neuberger Hall, South Park Hall

General information
- Location: Portland State University, Portland, Oregon, United States
- Coordinates: 45.511°N 122.685°W
- Opened: October 1961
- Renovated: 2018

Fariborz Maseeh Hall is a building on the Portland State University campus in Portland, Oregon, United States.

The first section of the building was completed in October 1961 and was originally known as South Park Hall. It was renamed Neuberger Hall after US Senator Richard L. Neuberger, in 1972. The second section was built as an addition and was completed in July 1969.

The building underwent a $70 million renovation between January 2018 and August 2019. The building was renamed after engineer Fariborz Maseeh, who donated the bulk of money for the remodel, at the completion of the modernization. The remodeled building also houses a branch of the Jordan Schnitzer Museum of Art.

== Name history ==
- South Park Hall, 1960–1972
- Neuberger Hall, 1972–2018
- Fariborz Maseeh Hall, September 26, 2019 – present
