= Hillsboro, Oregon =

- City
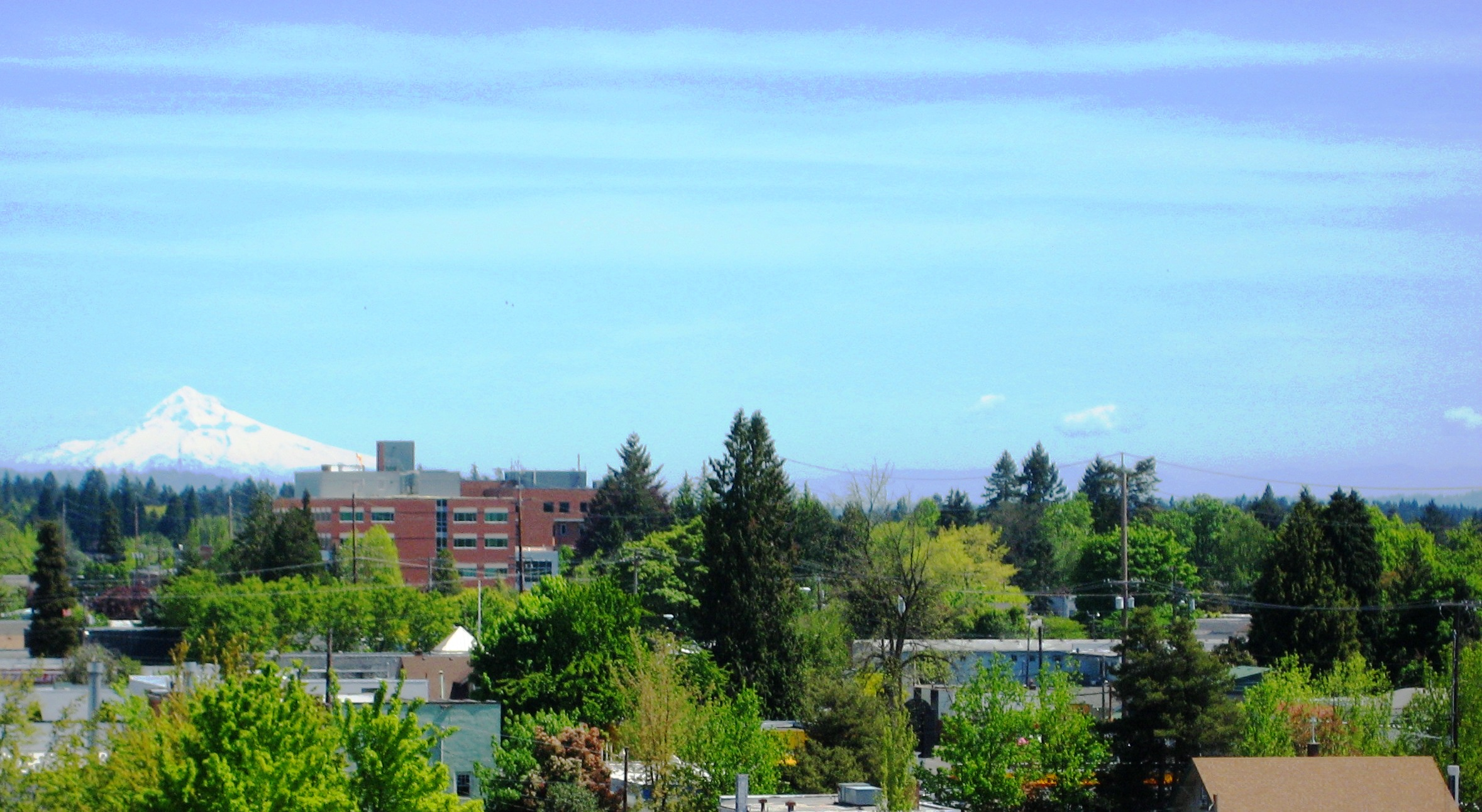
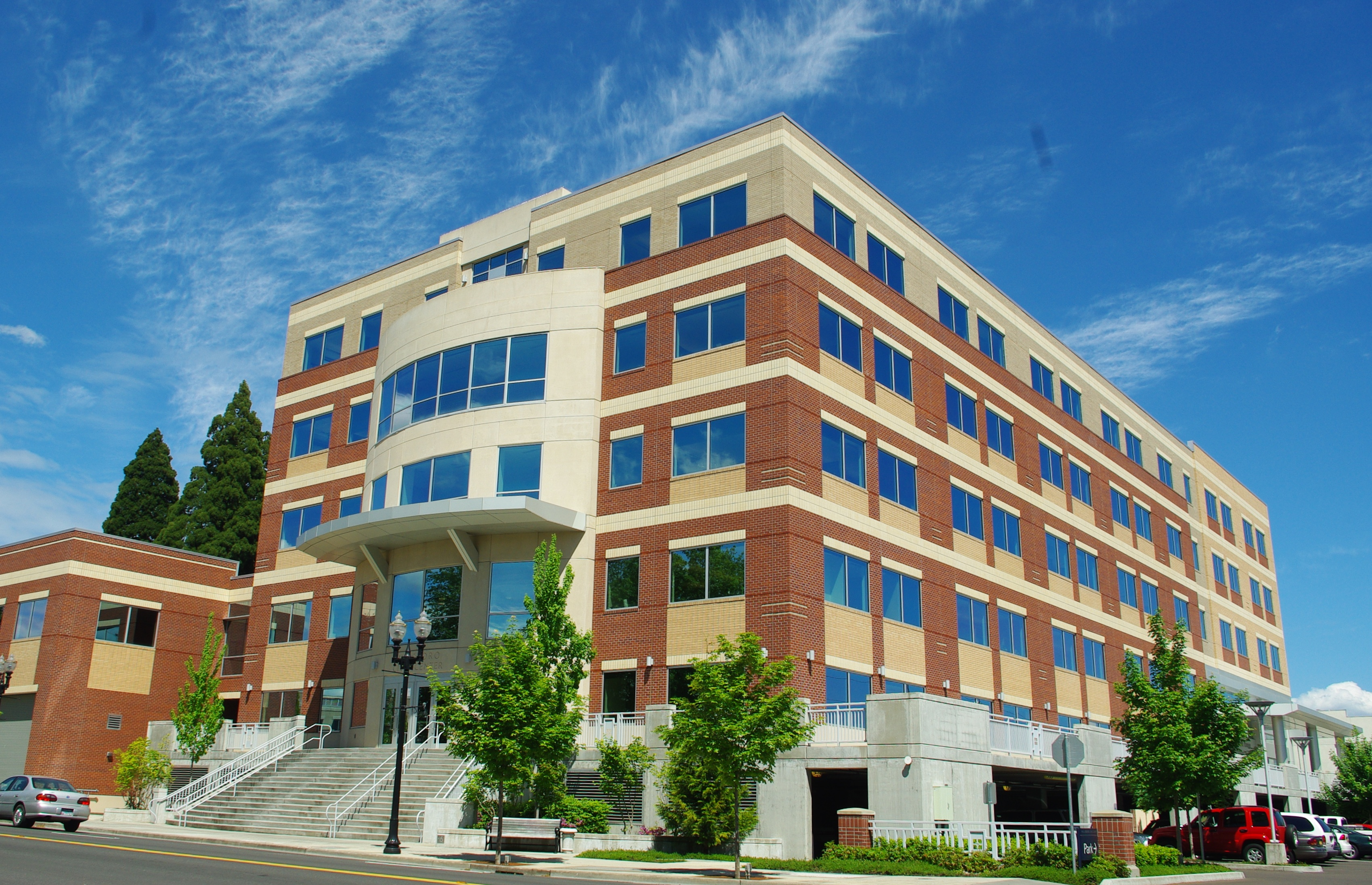
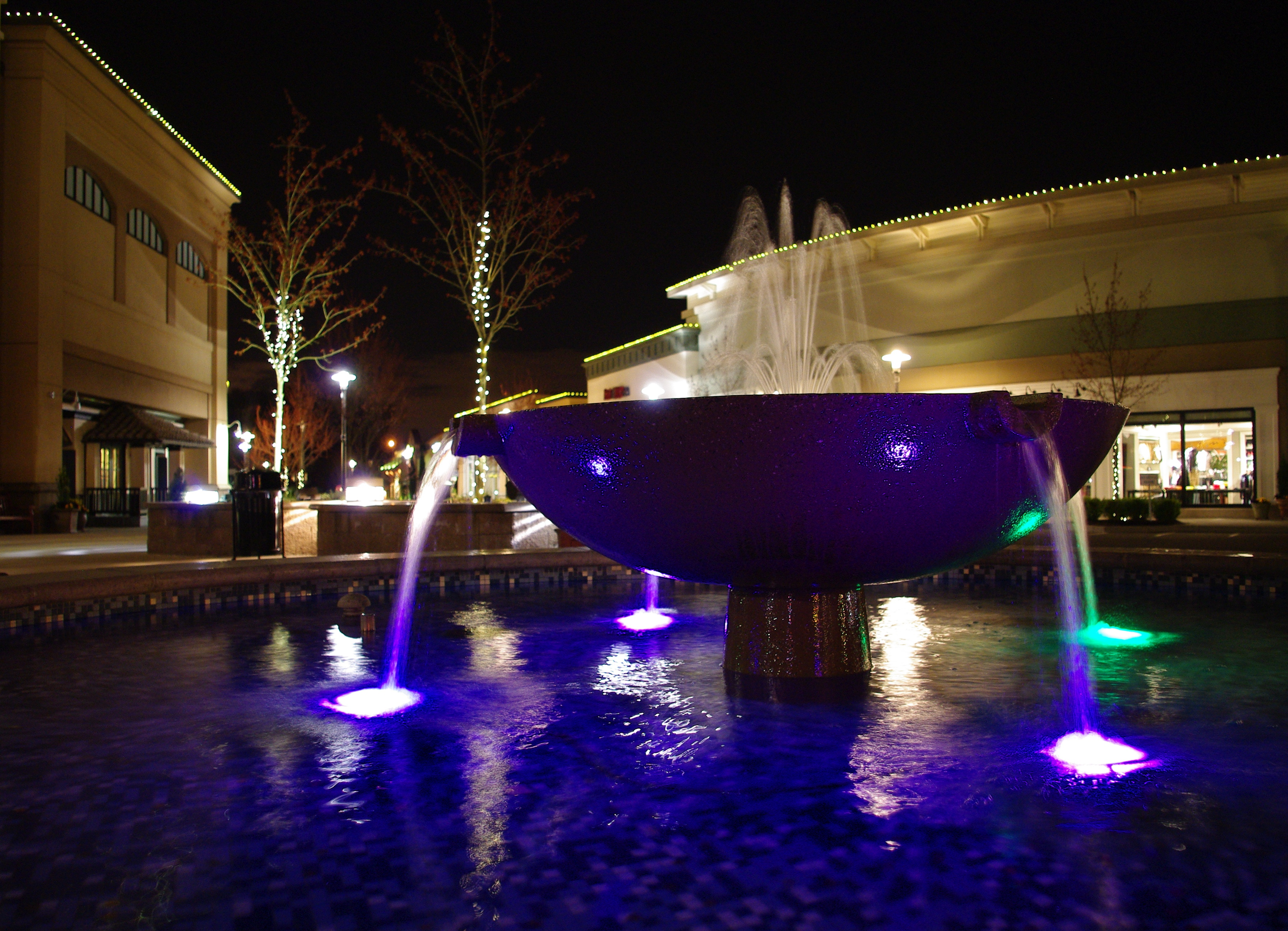
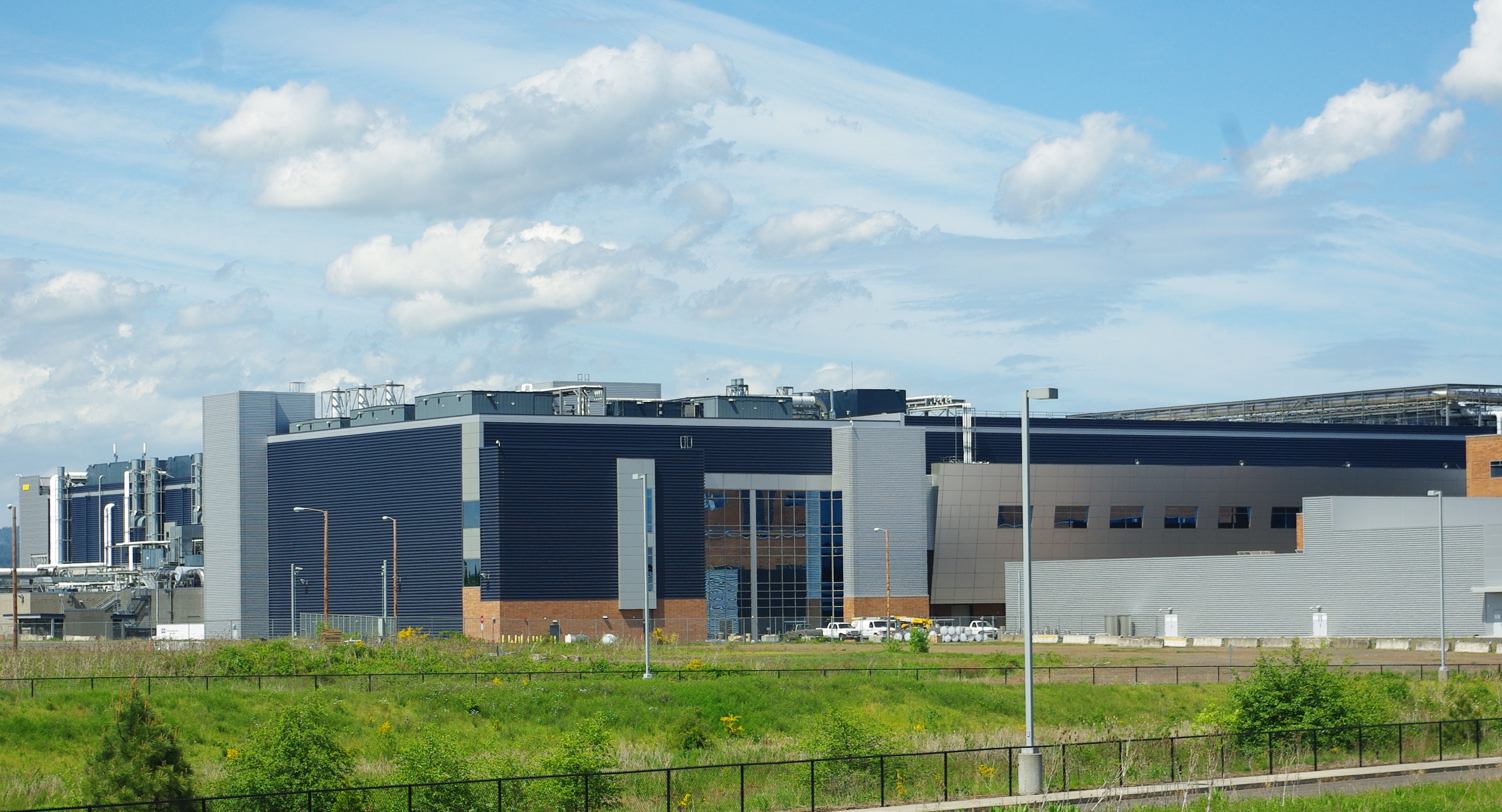
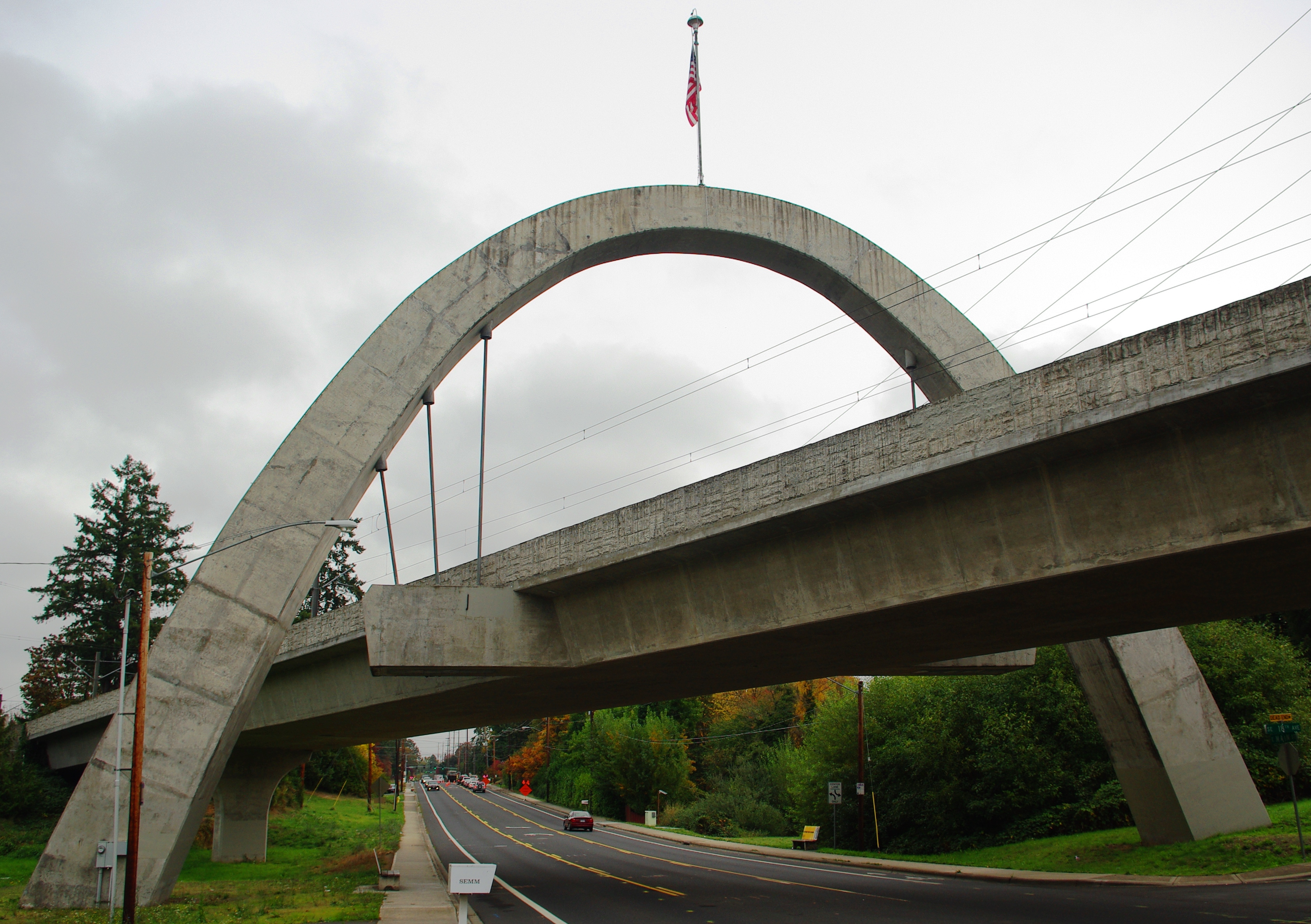
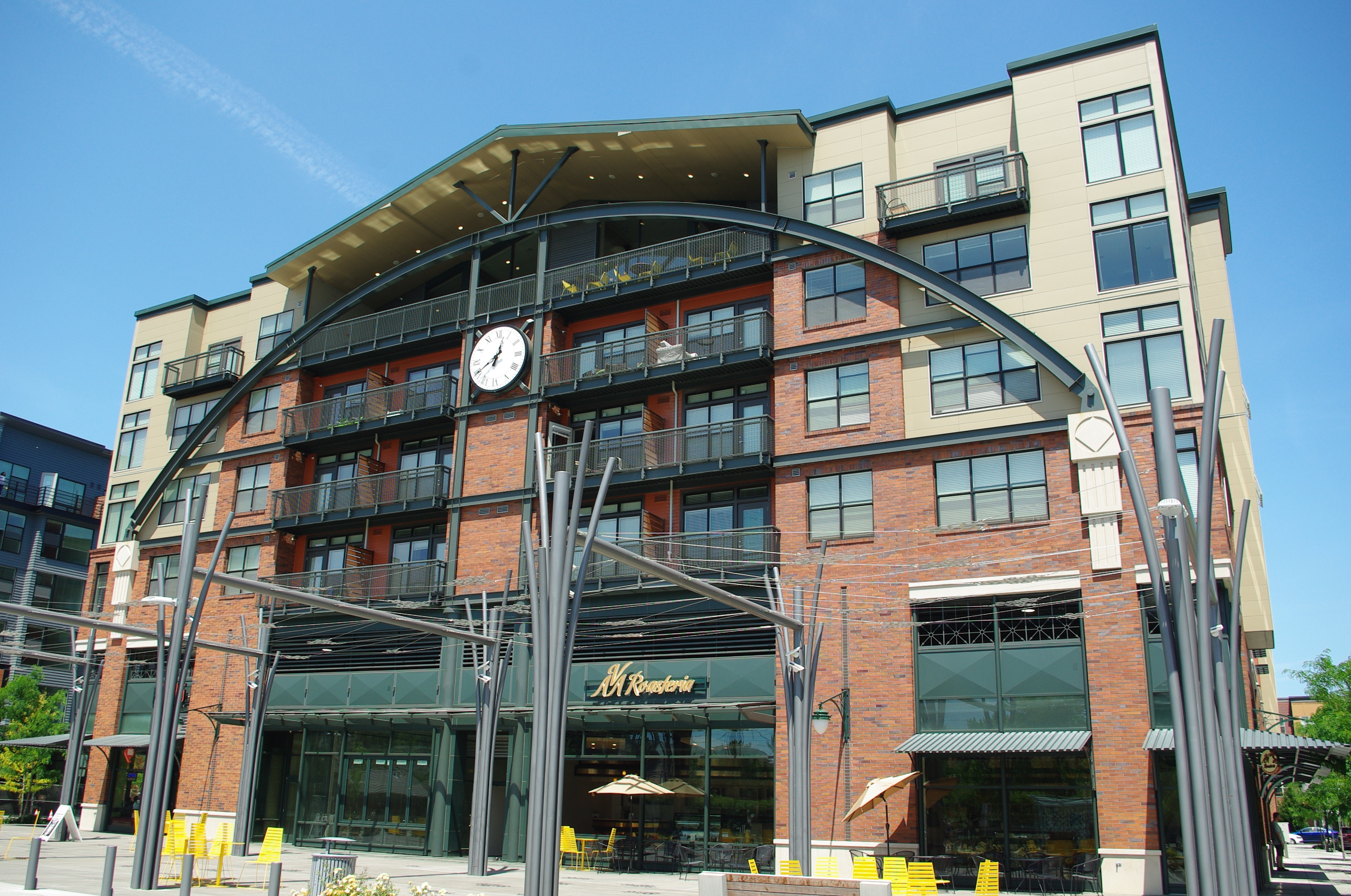
- From top: Downtown with Mount Hood and Tuality Hospital in the background, City Hall, fountain at The Streets of Tanasbourne, Intel's Ronler Acres Campus, Main Street Bridge, Jerry Willey Plaza at Orenco Station Plaza

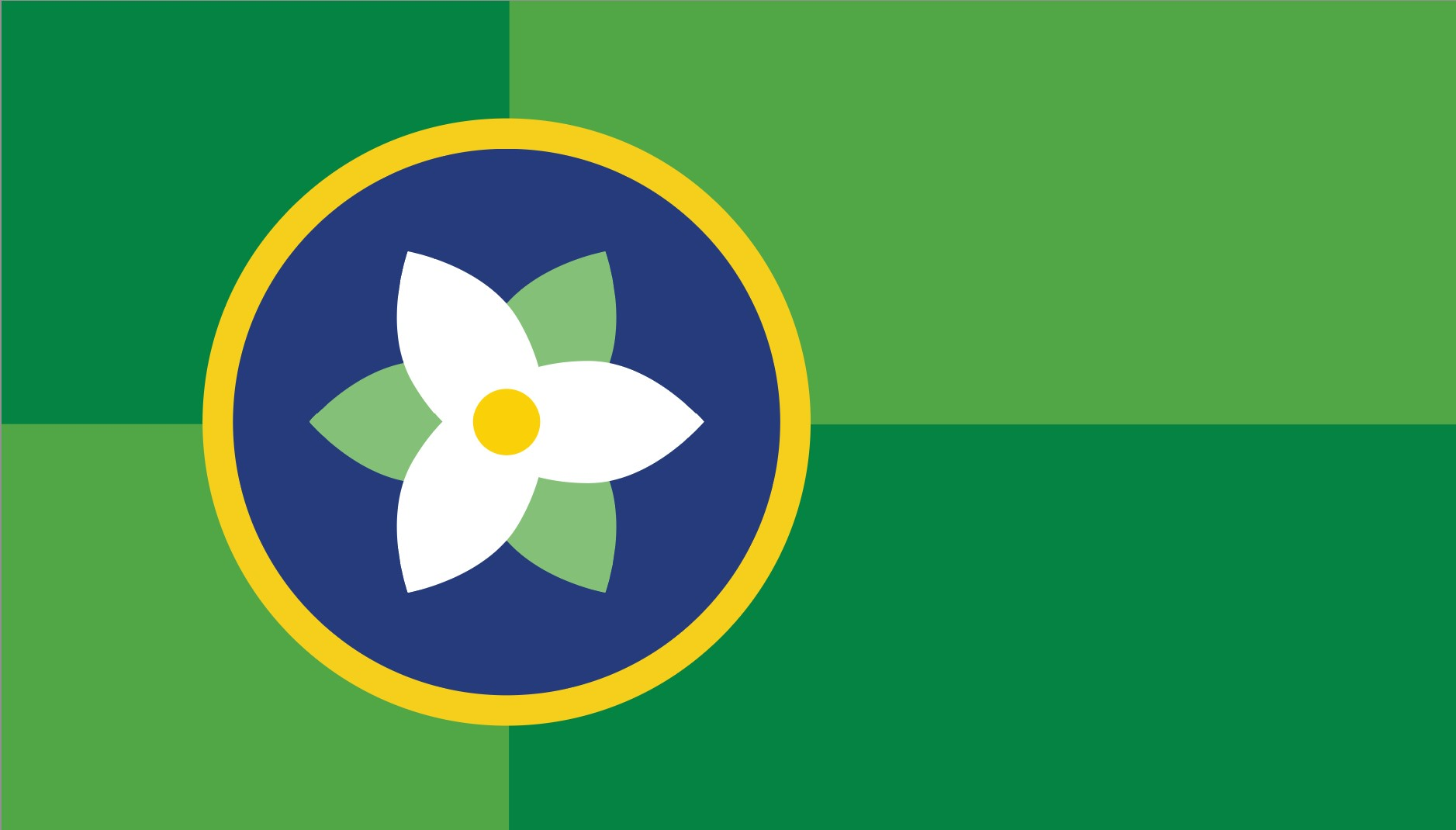
- Flag
- Nickname: The Hub City
- Location of Hillsboro in the state of Oregon
- Coordinates: 45°31′38″N 122°56′10″W
- Country: United States
- State: Oregon
- County: Washington
- Settled: 1841
- Laid Out: 1842
- Incorporated: October 19, 1876
- Named for: David Hill

Government
  - Type: Council–manager
  - Mayor: Beach Pace
  - City manager: Robby Hammond

Area
  - City: 25.85 sq mi (66.96 km^{2})
  - Land: 25.84 sq mi (66.93 km^{2})
  - Water: 0.012 sq mi (0.03 km^{2})
- Elevation: 148 ft (45 m)

Population (2020)
  - City: 106,490
  - Estimate (2025): 111,126
  - Rank: US: 298th OR: 5th
  - Density: 4,118.9/sq mi (1,590.33/km^{2})
  - Urban: 2,104,238 (US: 23rd)
  - Metro: 2,509,489 (US: 25th)
- Demonym: Hillsboroans
- Time zone: UTC–8 (Pacific (PST))
  - Summer (DST): UTC–7 (PDT)
- ZIP codes: 97003, 97006, 97123, 97124, 97129
- Area codes: 503 and 971
- FIPS code: 41-34100
- GNIS feature ID: 2410765
- Website: hillsboro-oregon.gov

Hillsboro (/ˈhɪlzbəroʊ/ HILZ-bər-oh) is a city in the U.S. state of Oregon and the county seat of Washington County. Situated in the Tualatin Valley on the west side of the Portland metropolitan area, the city hosts many high-technology companies, such as Intel, in an area locally known as the Silicon Forest. The population was 106,447 at the 2020 census, making Hillsboro the fifth-most populous city in Oregon.

Settlers founded a community here in 1842, later named after David Hill, an Oregon politician. Transportation by riverboat on the Tualatin River was part of Hillsboro's settler economy. A railroad reached the area in the early 1870s and an interurban electric railway about four decades later. These railways, as well as highways, aided the slow growth of the city to about 2,000 people by 1910 and about 5,000 by 1950, before the arrival of high-tech companies in the 1980s.

Hillsboro has a council-manager government consisting of a city manager and a city council headed by a mayor. In addition to the high-tech industry, other sectors important to Hillsboro's economy are health care, retail sales, and agriculture, including grapes and wineries. The city operates more than twenty parks and the mixed-use Hillsboro Stadium, and ten sites in the city are listed on the National Register of Historic Places (NRHP). Modes of transportation include private vehicles, public buses and light rail, and aircraft at the Hillsboro Airport. The city is home to Pacific University's Health Professions Campus.

== History ==
The European-American community was founded by David Hill, Isaiah Kelsey, and Richard Williams, who arrived in the Tualatin Valley in 1841, followed by six more pioneers in 1842. The locality went by two other names—East Tualatin Plains and Columbia—before it was named "Hillsborough" in February 1850 in honor of Hill, when he sold part of his land claim to the county. On February 5, 1850, commissioners chosen by the territorial legislature selected the community to be the seat of the county government. Hill was to be paid $200 for his land after plots had been sold for the town site, but he died before this occurred, and his widow Lucinda received the funds. The town's name was later simplified to Hillsboro. A log cabin was built in 1853 to serve as the community's first school, which opened in October 1854. Riverboats provided transportation to Hillsboro as early as 1867 when the side-wheel steamer Yamhill worked on the Tualatin River.

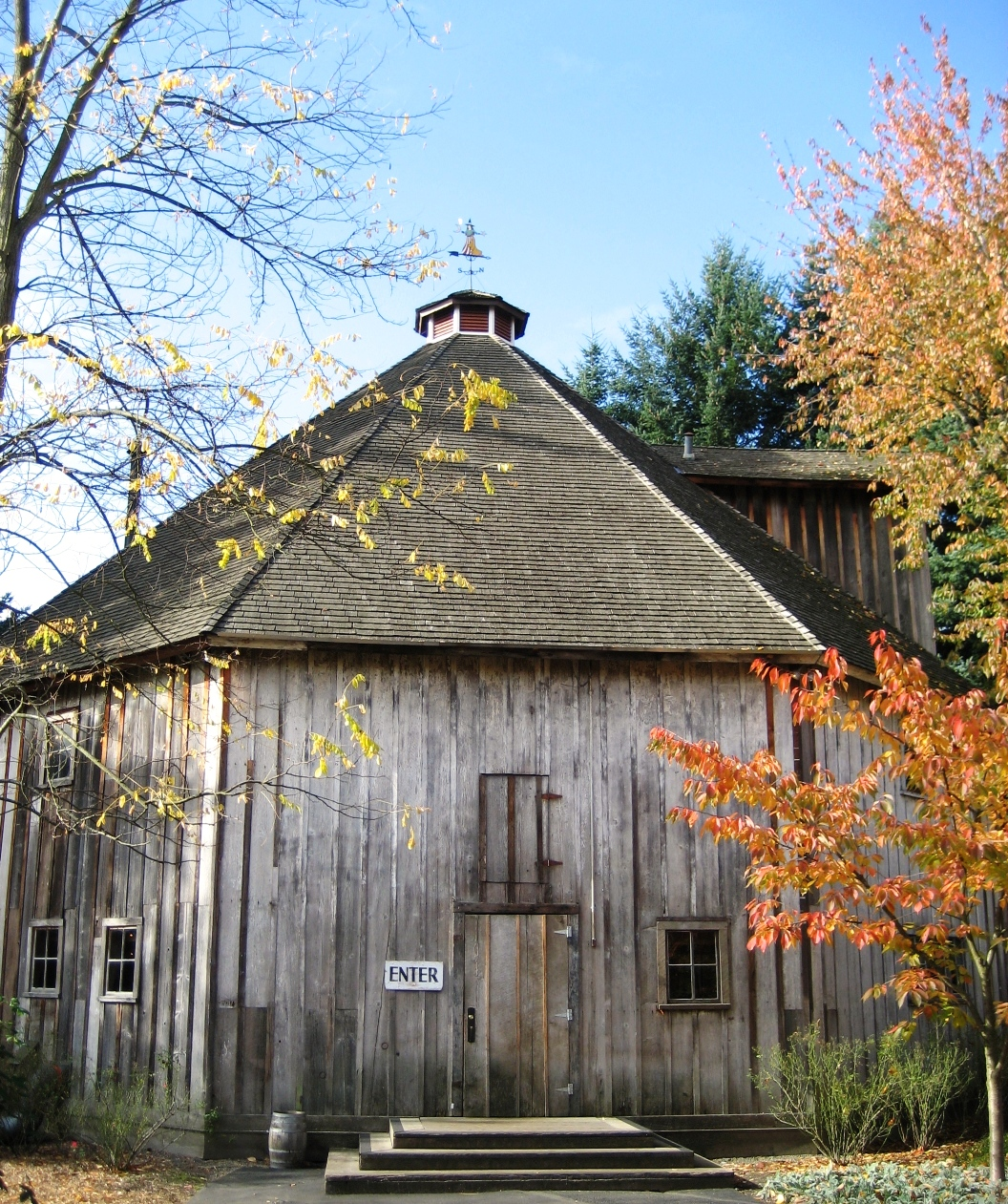
Octagonal barn at Imbrie Farm

In 1871, the Oregon and California Railroad line was extended to the area, but it ran just south of town because the city did not want to give the railroad land in exchange for the rail connection. Hillsboro was incorporated as the Town of Hillsboro on October 19, 1876, by the Oregon Legislature. The first mayor was A. Luelling, who took office on December 8, 1876, and served a one-year term. Notable later mayors included Congressman Thomas H. Tongue (1882 and 1886) and state senator William D. Hare (1885). In 1923, the city altered its charter and adopted a council-manager government with a six-person city council, a part-time mayor who determined major policies, and a city manager who ran day-to-day operations.

On September 30, 1908, 5,000 people gathered as the Oregon Electric Railway opened a connection between the city and Portland with an interurban electric rail line, the first to reach the community. In January 1914, the Southern Pacific Railroad introduced its own interurban service, known as the Red Electric, on a separate line and serving different communities between Hillsboro and Portland. SP discontinued its Hillsboro service on July 28, 1929, while the Oregon Electric Railway's passenger service to Hillsboro lasted until July 1932.

A brick building was constructed in 1852 to house the county government, followed by a brick courthouse in 1873. In 1891, the courthouse was remodeled and a clock tower was added, and the building was expanded with an annex in 1912. A new courthouse replaced the brick structure in 1928. The last major remodel of the 1928 structure occurred in 1972, when the Justice Services Building was built and incorporated into the existing building.

The city's first fire department was a hook and ladder company organized in 1880 by the board of trustees (now city council). A drinking water and electricity distribution system added in 1892–93 gave the town three fire hydrants and minimal street lighting. Hillsboro built its first sewer system in 1911, but sewage treatment was not added until 1936. In 1913, the city built its own water system, and the first library, Carnegie City Library, opened in December 1914. From 1921 to 1952, the world's second-tallest radio tower stood on the south side of the city, but in 1952, the wireless telegraph tower was demolished. During the 1950s and 1960s, the privately owned company Tualatin Valley Buses, Inc., provided transit service connecting Hillsboro with Beaverton and Portland. It was taken over by the publicly owned transit agency TriMet in 1970.

In 1972, the Hillsboro City Council passed a Green River ordinance banning door-to-door solicitation, but it was ruled unconstitutional by the Oregon Supreme Court in a 1988 decision. The court determined that the city ordinance was overly broad, in a case that was seen as a test case for many similar laws in the state. In 1979, Intel opened its first facility in Aloha, Oregon. The Aloha campus was followed by the Hawthorn Farms, then Jones Farm campus adjacent to the airport in 1982, and finally by the Ronler Acres campus in 1994. TriMet opened a Metropolitan Area Express (MAX) light rail line into the city in 1998. A cultural center was added in 2004, and a new city hall was completed in 2005. In 2008, SolarWorld opened a facility producing solar wafers, crystals, and cells, the largest plant of its kind in the Western Hemisphere. U.S. President Barack Obama visited the city and Intel's Ronler Acres campus in February 2011.

== Geography ==
The United States Census Bureau reports the city has a total area of 21.6 sq mi (55.9 km^{2}), all of which is land. In 2013, Hillsboro itself reported an area of 23.88 sq mi (61.8 km^{2}), equivalent to 15,283 acres (61.8 km^{2}). The city is located in the Tualatin Valley, and the Tualatin River forms part of the southern city limits. The city's terrain is fairly level, consistent with an agricultural past and the farms still in operation. Hillsboro is about 17 mi (27 km) west of Portland and immediately west of Beaverton, at an elevation of 194 ft (59 m) above sea level. In addition to the Tualatin River, streams include Dairy Creek, McKay Creek, Rock Creek, Dawson Creek, and Turner Creek. Neighboring communities in addition to Beaverton are Aloha, Cornelius, Glencoe, North Plains, Reedville, Scholls, and West Union.

Hillsboro's street system differs from many others in the county. Most parts of Washington County use a numbering system and cardinal direction orientation based on a grid that begins horizontally at the Willamette River in downtown Portland, and Vertically at the Willamette Baseline. For example, the street names in Beaverton generally include Southwest (SW) prefixes because Beaverton lies in the southwest quadrant of the Portland grid. Previously, some county road names and addresses in Hillsboro conformed to the Portland grid instead of Hillsboro's internal cardinal direction grid. In January 2015, the city began the process of making all addresses and streets within Hillsboro conform to the internal grid, through the Connecting Hillsboro Address Project.

The internal grid in Hillsboro centers on the downtown intersection of Main Street, which runs east–west, and First Avenue, which runs north–south. Most addresses within the city include a quadrant prefix: NW, NE, SW, or SE. Main Street is simply designated as East Main or West Main, and First Avenue is only North First or South First. Addresses on the streets' south side and the avenues' east side have even numbers, while odd numbers are on the opposite side. Hillsboro's street system contains 20 blocks per mile (12.5 blocks per kilometer).

North–south through roadways are called avenues, while east–west roadways are called streets. All cul-de-sacs are named courts. Private roadways are named ways or places. Roads that curve can be named drives. Alleys are named lanes. Non-city streets may not conform to these naming conventions.

=== Neighborhoods ===
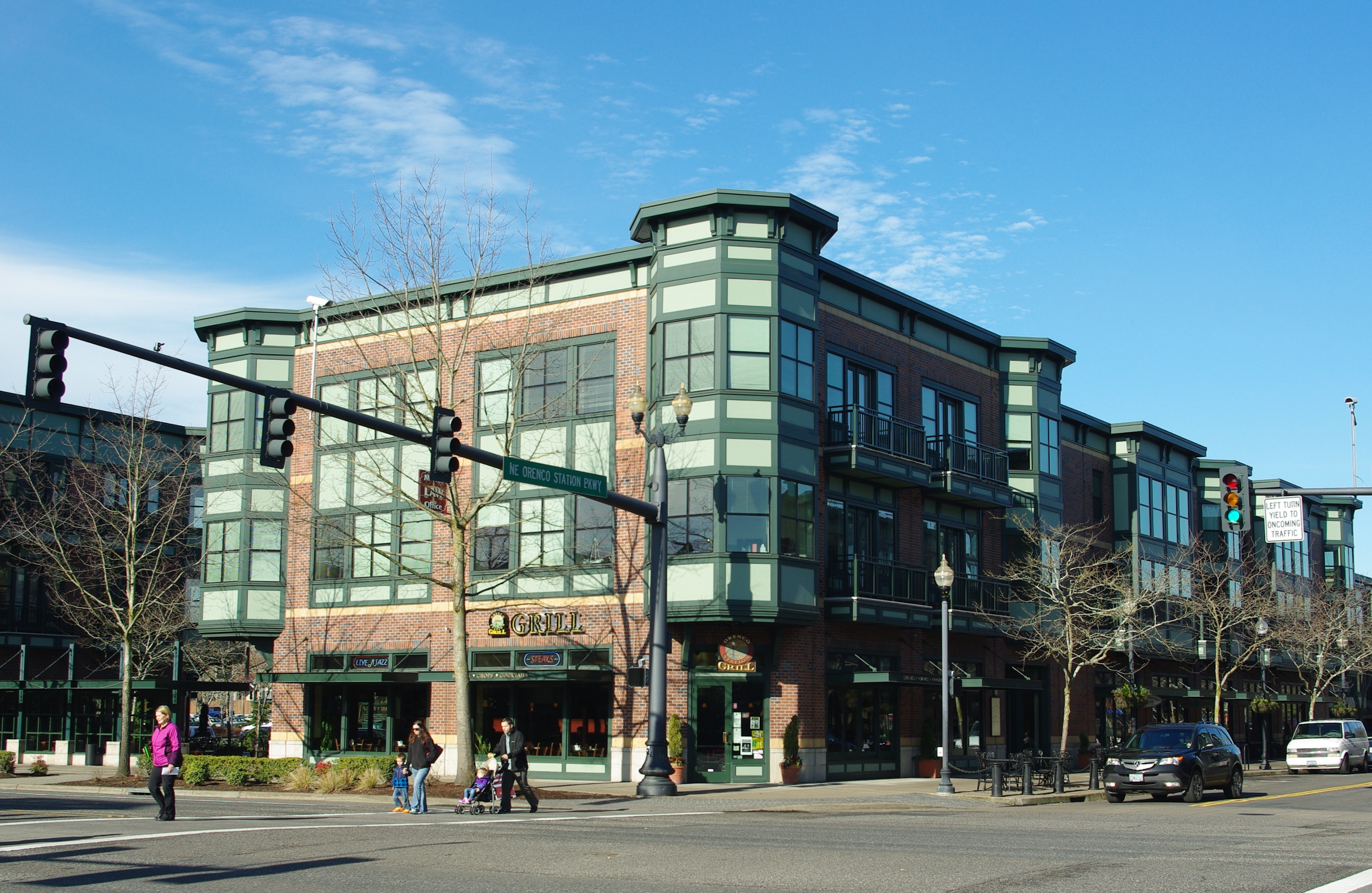
Mixed-use shops at the Orenco Station Town Center

The city's municipal code has designated several special plan areas, each of which follow area-specific plans and codes:

- Downtown encompasses the original city core and the area immediately surrounding it. Blocks in the downtown core are 400 ft (120 m) long on each side.
- Orenco consists of the Orenco Townsite Conservation zone (encompassing a former company town originally created by the Oregon Nursery Company) and the Orenco Station sub-area, which is described in the city code as a "compact, transit-supportive mixed-use neighborhood with reduced automobile reliance".
- The Hawthorn Farm / Fair Complex Plan District is centered on the Hawthorn Farm LRT station and the Washington County Fairgrounds (known since 2019 as the Westside Commons).
- Amberglen, located just south of the Tanasbourne neighborhood, is envisioned as "a vibrant, regional activity center enlivened with high-quality pedestrian and environmental amenities, taking advantage of the region’s light rail system". Located within the district is Oregon Health & Science University's West Campus.
- The South Hillsboro planning district encompasses the newly annexed South Hillsboro neighborhood, described in the city code as "a complete, connected and green community". The neighborhood, built on land once used as a hobby farm by William Ladd and Simeon Reed, is slated to become "a residential mixed-use community organized around a town center and complemented by a village center".
- The North Hillsboro Industrial Area Plan District lies within Hillsboro's Industrial District, where many of the Silicon Forest's manufacturing and technology businesses reside. Over half of the city's total employment is located within the Hillsboro Industrial District.
- The city's Comprehensive Plan outlines several other plan areas not defined in the city code: Quatama, Tanasbourne, NE 28th Ave/East Main Street Plan Area, and Witch Hazel Village.

=== Climate ===
Summers in Hillsboro are generally warm, but temperatures year-round are moderated by a marine influence from the Pacific Ocean. The Willamette Valley in which Hillsboro lies receives the majority of its precipitation during the winter months, with the wettest period from November through March. This occasionally includes snowfall. Hillsboro receives precipitation on 161 days per year, on average. The average yearly precipitation between 1930 and 1998 was 38 in (970 mm). August is the warmest month with an average high temperature of 81 °F (27 °C), while January is the coolest month with an average high of 46 °F (8 °C). The highest recorded temperature, 114 °F (46 °C), occurred on June 28, 2021, and the lowest, −14 °F (−26 °C), occurred in January 1930.

Like the rest of the Willamette Valley, Hillsboro lies in the Marine West Coast climate zone, with Mediterranean characteristics.

Climate data for Hillsboro, Oregon (1991–2020 normals, extremes 1929–present)
Month	Jan	Feb	Mar	Apr	May	Jun	Jul	Aug	Sep	Oct	Nov	Dec	Year
Record high °F (°C)	69 (21)	70 (21)	83 (28)	90 (32)	100 (38)	114 (46)	108 (42)	107 (42)	103 (39)	92 (33)	78 (26)	64 (18)	114 (46)
Mean maximum °F (°C)	57.2 (14.0)	60.6 (15.9)	69.5 (20.8)	78.3 (25.7)	86.6 (30.3)	91.4 (33.0)	96.9 (36.1)	97.3 (36.3)	92.4 (33.6)	77.9 (25.5)	63.5 (17.5)	56.9 (13.8)	99.9 (37.7)
Mean daily maximum °F (°C)	47.3 (8.5)	51.0 (10.6)	55.9 (13.3)	60.9 (16.1)	68.7 (20.4)	73.5 (23.1)	82.1 (27.8)	82.4 (28.0)	76.4 (24.7)	63.7 (17.6)	52.6 (11.4)	46.2 (7.9)	63.4 (17.4)
Daily mean °F (°C)	40.4 (4.7)	42.3 (5.7)	46.2 (7.9)	50.1 (10.1)	56.7 (13.7)	61.0 (16.1)	67.2 (19.6)	67.1 (19.5)	62.0 (16.7)	52.3 (11.3)	44.6 (7.0)	39.8 (4.3)	52.5 (11.4)
Mean daily minimum °F (°C)	33.6 (0.9)	33.5 (0.8)	36.5 (2.5)	39.2 (4.0)	44.7 (7.1)	48.6 (9.2)	52.2 (11.2)	51.8 (11.0)	47.5 (8.6)	40.9 (4.9)	36.5 (2.5)	33.3 (0.7)	41.5 (5.3)
Mean minimum °F (°C)	22.0 (−5.6)	23.9 (−4.5)	27.5 (−2.5)	31.2 (−0.4)	35.3 (1.8)	40.4 (4.7)	45.0 (7.2)	44.3 (6.8)	38.5 (3.6)	30.4 (−0.9)	25.0 (−3.9)	21.4 (−5.9)	16.8 (−8.4)
Record low °F (°C)	−14 (−26)	−9 (−23)	18 (−8)	20 (−7)	26 (−3)	30 (−1)	36 (2)	30 (−1)	29 (−2)	20 (−7)	8 (−13)	−2 (−19)	−14 (−26)
Average precipitation inches (mm)	5.27 (134)	3.97 (101)	3.70 (94)	2.57 (65)	2.02 (51)	1.31 (33)	0.37 (9.4)	0.48 (12)	1.38 (35)	3.37 (86)	5.44 (138)	6.05 (154)	35.93 (913)
Average precipitation days	19.3	16.1	18.4	16.0	12.0	8.7	2.9	3.5	7.6	14.9	19.4	19.9	158.7
Average relative humidity (%)	85	85	83	78	73	71	65	64	70	78	85	85	77
Mean daily sunshine hours	3.8	3.7	5.3	7.0	8.3	8.9	10.5	10.6	8.9	5.1	4.3	3.9	6.7
Mean daily daylight hours	9.2	10.4	12.0	13.6	14.9	15.6	15.3	14.0	12.5	10.9	9.5	8.8	12.2
Average ultraviolet index	2	2	3	3	4	5	6	4	4	3	2	2	3
Source 1: NOAA
Source 2: Weather Atlas (UV and humidity)

== Demographics ==
Historical population
Census	Pop.	Note	%±
1880	402		—
1890	1,246		210.0%
1900	980		−21.3%
1910	2,016		105.7%
1920	2,468		22.4%
1930	3,039		23.1%
1940	3,747		23.3%
1950	5,142		37.2%
1960	8,232		60.1%
1970	15,365		86.6%
1980	27,664		80.0%
1990	37,598		35.9%
2000	70,187		86.7%
2010	91,611		30.5%
2020	106,447		16.2%
2025 (est.)	111,126		4.4%
U.S. Decennial Census; 2020 Census

Hillsboro's population grew from 402 in 1880 to 2,016 by 1910, making it the county's most populated city, according to the 1910 census data. By 1970, it had increased to more than 15,000, although neighboring Beaverton had overtaken it as the county's most populous city. By 1990 there were more than 37,000 residents, and commuters raised this to 110,000 during daytime. At the 2010 Census, the population was 91,611, fifth in rank among the state's largest cities behind Portland, Eugene, Salem and Gresham and slightly ahead of Beaverton, which ranked sixth. This figure was a 30.5% increase from Hillsboro's 70,186 residents in 2000, which made Hillsboro the fourth fastest-growing city in the state during the 2000s (decade), and the fastest-growing city in the Willamette Valley over the same period. In 2007, there were 17,126 houses lived in by their owners, with an average home price in the city of $246,900. Bloomberg Businessweek listed the city as the fastest-growing in Oregon for the period between 1990 and 2010, for cities with populations over 10,000.

=== 2020 census ===
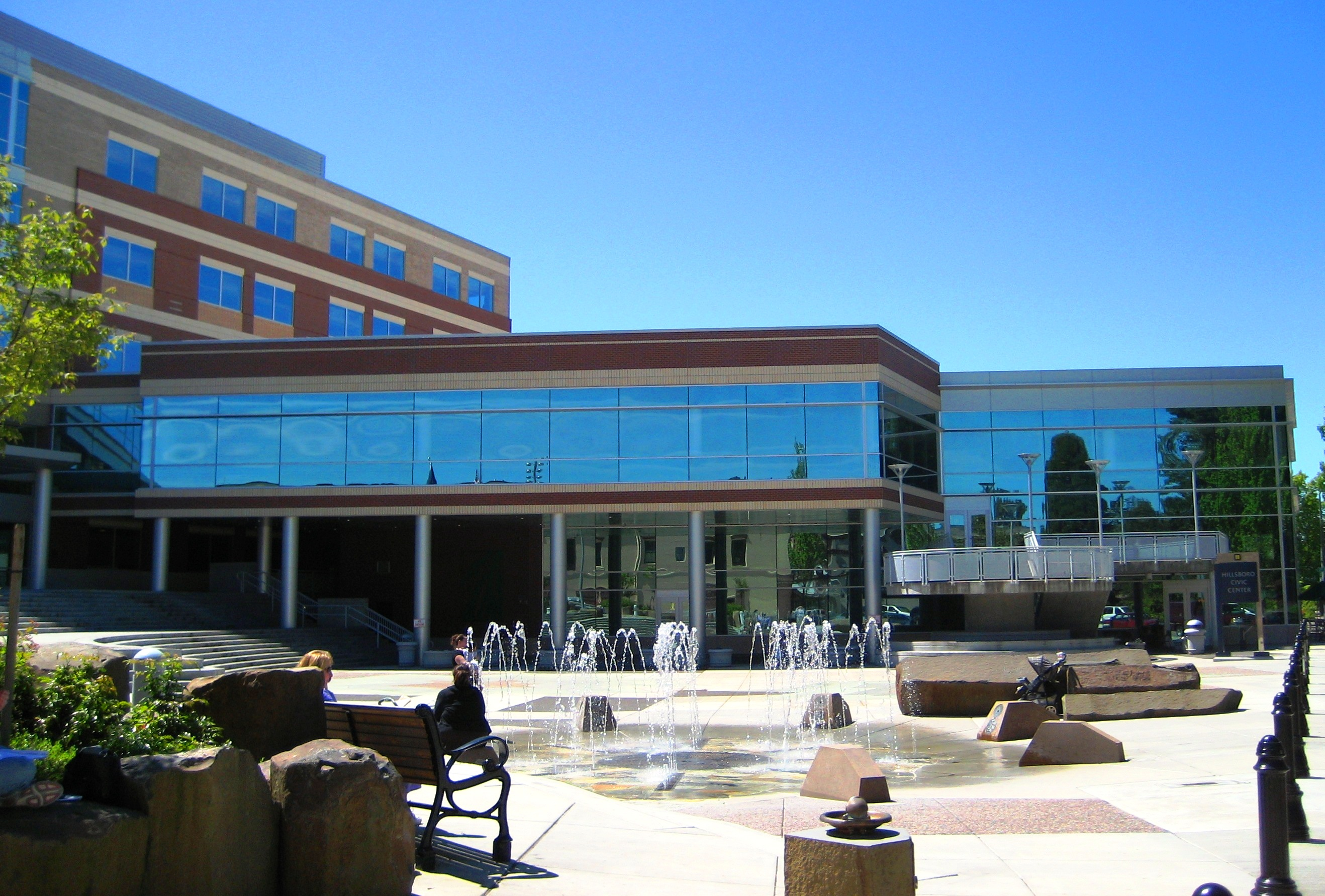
Hillsboro's Civic Center and City Hall

As of the 2020 census, there were 106,447 people and 40,328 households in Hillsboro.

100.0% of residents lived in urban areas, while <0.1% lived in rural areas.

There were 40,328 households in Hillsboro, of which 32.3% had children under the age of 18 living in them. Of all households, 47.6% were married-couple households, 19.8% were households with a male householder and no spouse or partner present, and 24.0% were households with a female householder and no spouse or partner present. About 25.0% of all households were made up of individuals and 7.1% had someone living alone who was 65 years of age or older.

There were 42,363 housing units, of which 4.8% were vacant. Among occupied housing units, 49.9% were owner-occupied and 50.1% were renter-occupied. The homeowner vacancy rate was 1.5% and the rental vacancy rate was 5.3%.

The median age was 34.3 years. 22.6% of residents were under the age of 18 and 11.1% of residents were 65 years of age or older. For every 100 females there were 101.5 males, and for every 100 females age 18 and over there were 99.9 males age 18 and over.

Racial composition as of the 2020 census
Race	Number	Percent
White	61,512	57.8%
Black or African American	3,122	2.9%
American Indian and Alaska Native	1,428	1.3%
Asian	13,411	12.6%
Native Hawaiian and Other Pacific Islander	568	0.5%
Some other race	13,300	12.5%
Two or more races	13,106	12.3%
Hispanic or Latino (of any race)	25,618	24.1%

== Economy ==
=== Top employers ===
According to the City's 2022 Comprehensive Annual Financial Report, the largest employers in the city are:

#	Employer	Type of Business	# of Employees	Percentage
1	Intel Corporation	Computer Electronics and Related Devices	20,000	30.60%
2	Hillsboro School District	Education	2,617	3.64%
3	Washington County	County Government	2,306	3.21%
4	Nike	Administrative Offices	1,832	2.55%
5	Tuality Healthcare and OHSU	Hospitals	1,300	1.81%
6	City of Hillsboro	Local Government	1,226	1.71%
7	Tokyo Electron America	Semiconductors and Related Devices	1,200	1.67%
8	Amazon	Retail Delivery	1,103	1.53%
9	Qorvo	Semiconductors and Related Devices	1,085	1.51%
10	Kaiser Permanente	Medical	1,064	1.48%
—	Total employers	—	35,733	49.69%

Manufacturing is the leading employment sector in Hillsboro, employing 24% of the workforce, followed by health care, education, and social services with a total of 15%. One example of a manufacturer headquartered in Hillsboro is Beaverton Foods, a family-owned condiment manufacturer since 1929, with 70+ employees and $25 million in annual sales; it moved to its current headquarters in 2001. Retail employment constitutes 12%, construction makes up 7%, and 13% of workers are employed in the administrative, scientific, professional, or waste management industries. 68% of workers commute alone to the workplace, and 8% use public transportation. The average one-way commute time is about 24 minutes.

Many technology companies operate in Hillsboro, making it the center of Oregon's Silicon Forest. In particular, Intel's largest site is in Hillsboro, and includes three large campuses: Ronler Acres, Jones Farm, and Hawthorn Farm, along with several smaller campuses that employ about 16,000 workers. Other high-tech companies operating facilities in Hillsboro include Synopsys, Epson, Salesforce, and Oracle's (formerly Sun Microsystems) High-End Operations. Hillsboro is the corporate headquarters for RadiSys and Planar Systems among others.

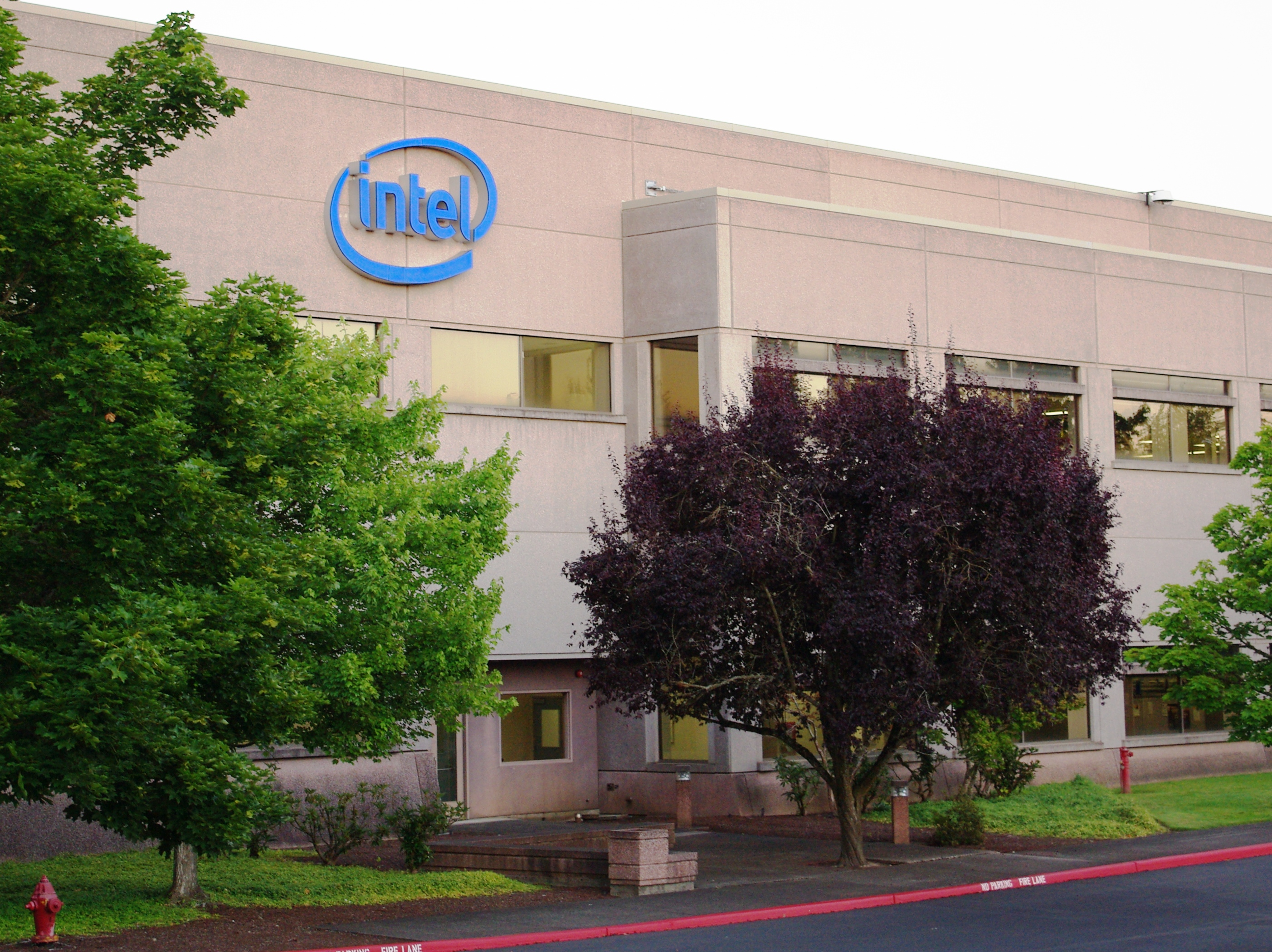
Hawthorn Farm Intel campus

In 2006, Genentech announced plans to locate a packaging and distribution facility on 100 acres (0.40 km^{2}) in Hillsboro. The $400 million facility opened in 2010, which Oregon officials hoped would eventually also be used for research and development for the biotechnology company. Other biotech or medical companies based in Hillsboro include FEI Company and Acumed.

The city is also a landing point on three fiber optic cable systems linking the United States across the Pacific Ocean: C2C, Southern Cross Cable, and VSNL Transpacific. These cable landings, lower energy costs, and tax breaks led to a boom of data centers being built starting about 2010. Data centers include those for Adobe, NetApp, Umpqua Bank, OHSU, and Fortune Data Centers.

Hillsboro serves as the corporate headquarters for Rodgers Instruments, Soloflex, Norm Thompson Outfitters, and Parr Lumber, among others. Fujitsu and NEC Corporation formerly had factories in Hillsboro. Hillsboro is also home to the Laika stop-motion animation studio, creator of the Oscar-nominated feature films Coraline (2009) and Paranorman (2012). In addition, Erickson Aero Tanker, an aviation company which operates McDonnell Douglas MD-87 jetliners converted for use as aerial firefighting air tankers, is based in Hillsboro.

The Hatfield Government Center in Hillsboro is the western terminus of the MAX Blue Line, part of the Portland metropolitan area's light-rail system. The presence of MAX prompted the development of the pedestrian-oriented community of Orenco Station within Hillsboro. (See also: Orenco, Oregon.)

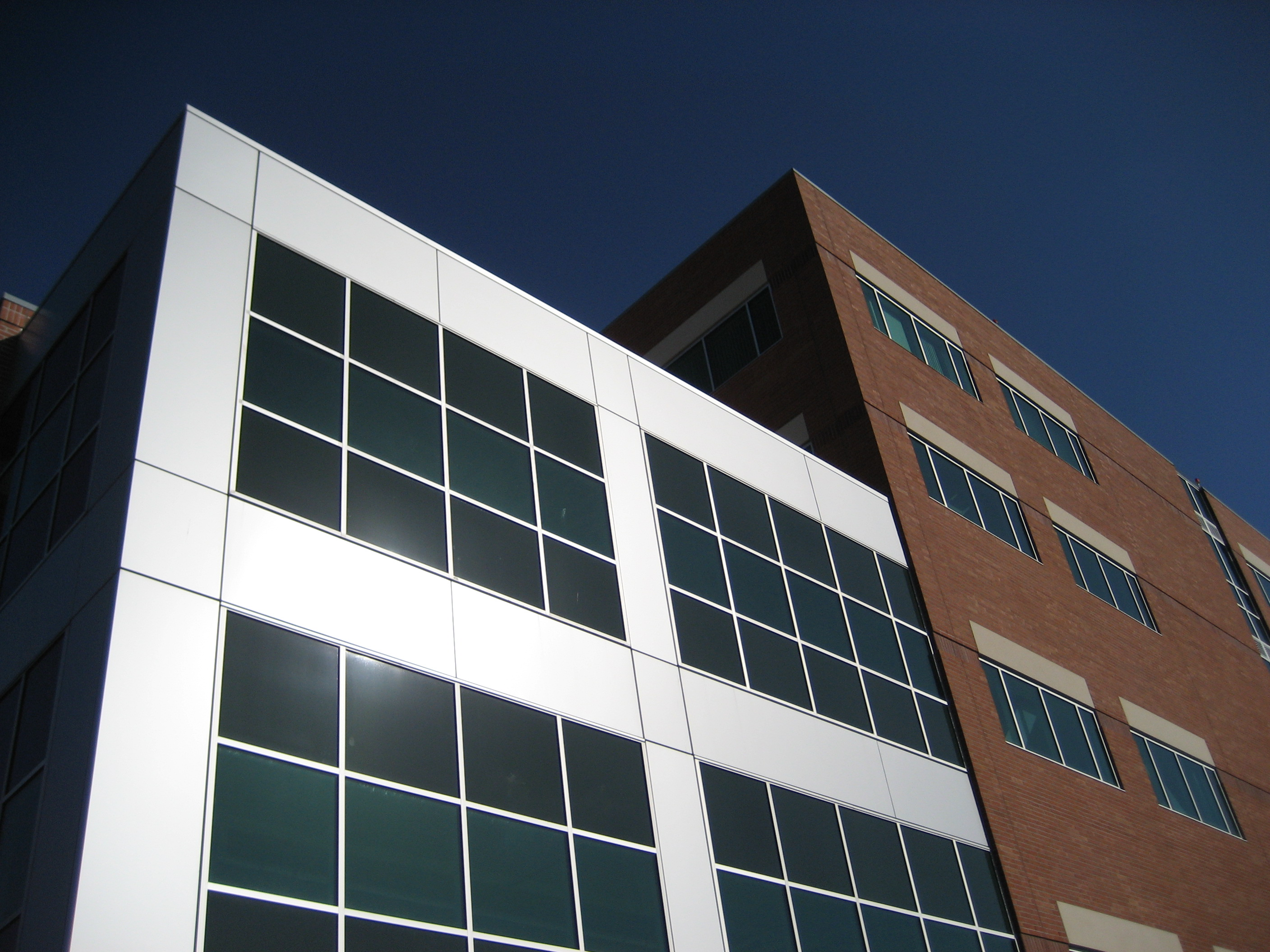
One of Tuality Healthcare's buildings in downtown

Hillsboro's primary commercial cores are concentrated along Tualatin Valley Highway and Cornell Road. Additionally, the Tanasbourne neighborhood is a regional shopping area on the eastern edge of the city. The neighborhood is home to the lifestyle shopping center The Streets of Tanasbourne. The $55 million outdoor complex with 368,000 sq ft (34,200 m^{2}) of retail space opened in 2004 with Meier & Frank (later Macy's) as the anchor tenant.

The other large shopping center in the city is The Sunset Esplanade, located along Tualatin Valley Highway. In November 2005, the world's largest Costco, a warehouse club store, opened in Hillsboro. The store, with 205,000 sq ft (19,000 m^{2}) of floor space, is about 60,000 sq ft (5,600 m^{2}) bigger than the average Costco.

== Arts and culture ==
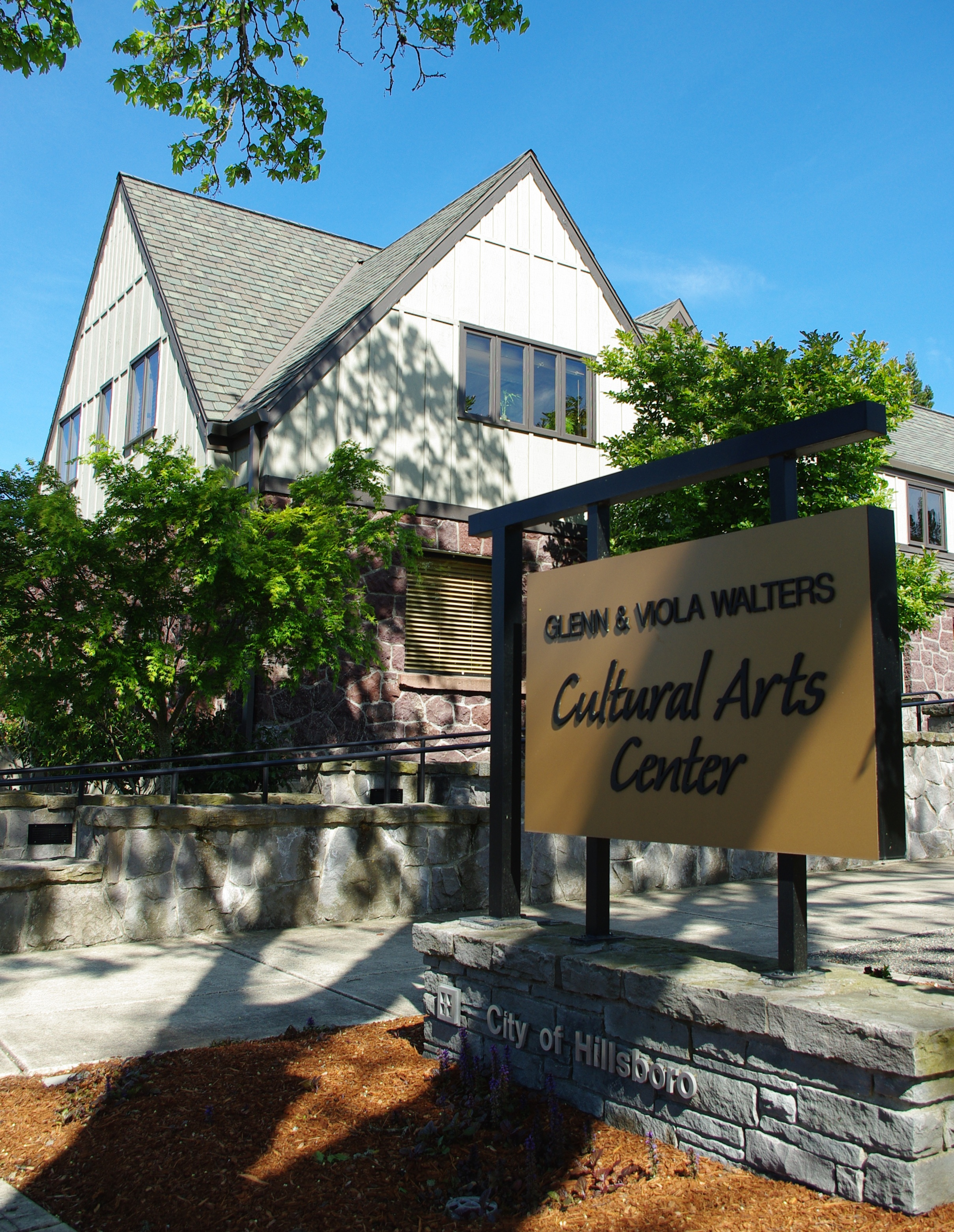
Glenn & Viola Walters Cultural Arts Center

Within the city are two commercial movie theaters with a total of 29 screens. Until its closure in 2017, one historic theater had also remained in operation: the Venetian Theatre, which had re-opened at the site of the old Town Theater in 2008. The Oregon Chorale (a 60-person symphonic choir), a men's barbershop chorus, the Hillsboro Symphony Orchestra, and the Hillsboro Artists' Regional Theatre are also located in Hillsboro. The orchestra was founded in 2001 under the direction of Stefan Minde. In 2004, the city opened the Glenn & Viola Walters Cultural Arts Center in a remodeled church in downtown. The center provides space for galleries and performances, as well as classrooms for art instruction. The Rice Northwest Museum of Rocks and Minerals is located on the northern edge of the city. The Five Oaks Museum (at the time Washington County Museum) was located in downtown Hillsboro from 2012 to 2017, and later moved back to its previous location, at the Rock Creek campus of Portland Community College, just northeast of Hillsboro.

Hillsboro's annual Fourth of July Parade is the second-largest Independence Day parade in Oregon. The Oregon International Air Show, Oregon's largest air show, is held each year during the summer at the Hillsboro Airport. Each summer the city offers a free concert series at Shute Park (Showtime at Shute), while the Washington County Fair is held annually at the Westside Commons (county fairgrounds) adjacent to the airport. The name Westside Commons is a 2019 renaming of the Washington County Fairgrounds (also known as Fair Complex). A new 89,000 ft^{2} (8,300 m^{2}) conference center and exhibition hall, known as the Wingspan Event & Conference Center, opened at the Commons in August 2020, replacing buildings demolished in 2018.

Hillsboro operates two library branches. Opened in 2007 after a smaller location was closed, the 38,000 sq ft (3,500 m^{2}) main branch is located in the north-central section of the city. The older, smaller second branch is in Shute Park in the southwest area of the city. The Hillsboro libraries are part of Washington County Cooperative Library Services, which allows residents to use other libraries in the county and includes interlibrary loans.

=== Registered Historic Places ===
Properties listed on the National Register of Historic Places (NRHP) in and around Hillsboro include the Old Scotch Church, completed in 1876 north of the city. Near the Orenco neighborhood is Imbrie Farm, which includes a house built in 1866 and the Frank Imbrie Barn, both of which McMenamins converted for use as a brewpub. Built in 1935, the Harold Wass Ray House is near Intel's Hawthorn Farm campus. Historic properties in downtown include the Zula Linklater House (completed 1923), Rice–Gates House (1890), Edward Schulmerich House (c. 1915), and Charles Shorey House (c. 1908). The Richard and Helen Rice House is adjacent to the Sunset Highway on the north side of the city and houses the Rice Northwest Museum of Rocks and Minerals. The Old Washington County Jail had been at the Washington County Fairgrounds (now known as the Westside Commons) in the city, but was restored and moved to the Five Oaks Museum outside the city in 2004, and was de-listed from the NRHP in 2008. In 2007, the Manning–Kamna Farm was added to the NRHP and includes 10 buildings, dating to as early as 1883. The Malcolm McDonald House in Orenco was added to the Registry in 2015.

=== Landmarks ===
Landmarks in Hillsboro include the Washington County Courthouse, the seat of county government. Along the western edge of the city is Hillsboro Pioneer Cemetery, established in 1870, which serves as the final resting place of city pioneers and politicians. Next to the airport is the Westside Commons (known as the Washington County Fairgrounds, or Fair Complex, until 2019), home to the annual county fair. Located at Shute Park was the 25 ft (7.6 m) tall wood sculpture Chief Kno-Tah, donated to Hillsboro and dedicated in 1987 as part of Peter Wolf Toth's Trail of the Whispering Giants. Due to storm damage, it was removed in 2017.

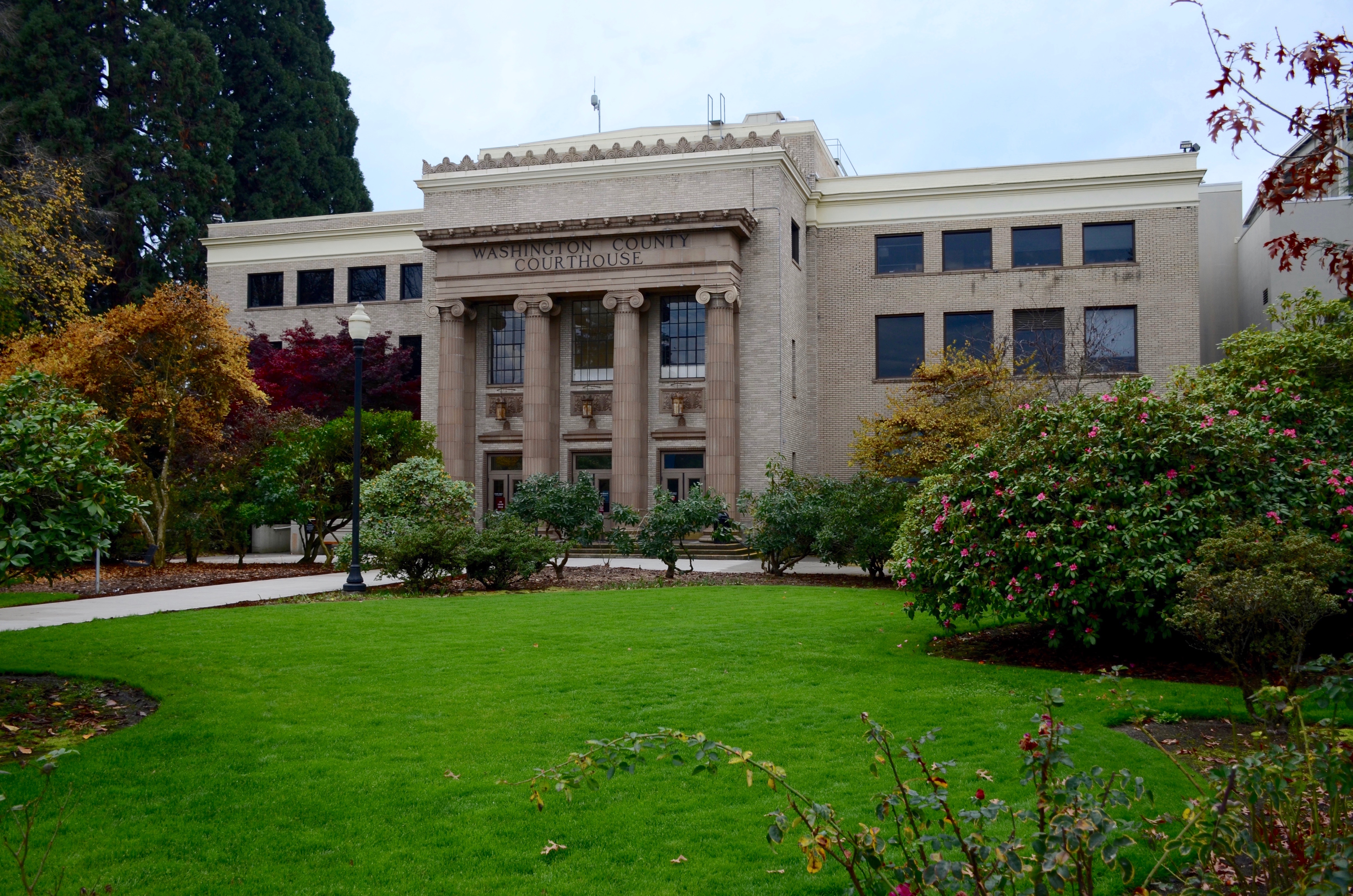
The Washington County Courthouse

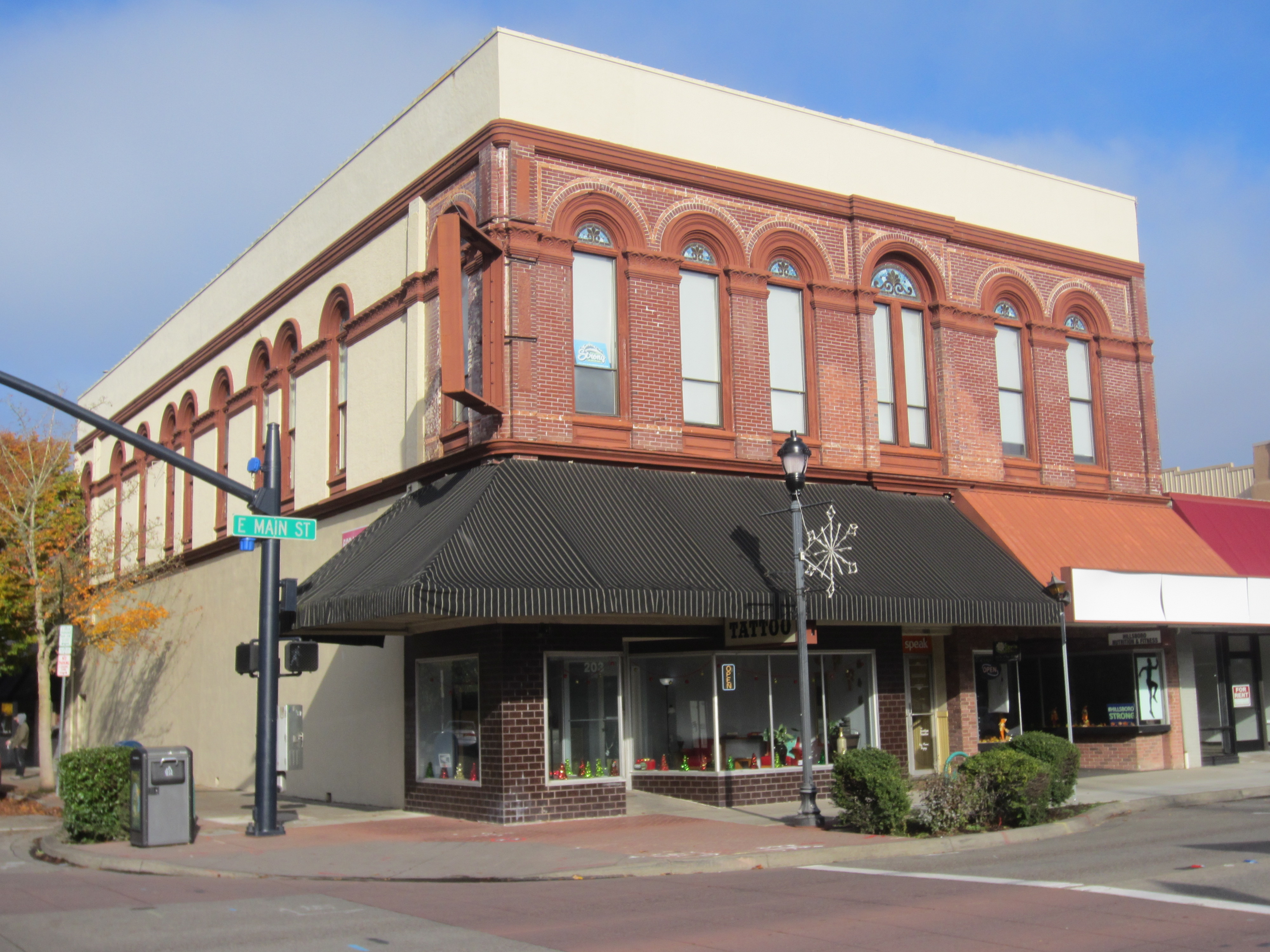
Morgan and Bailey Building

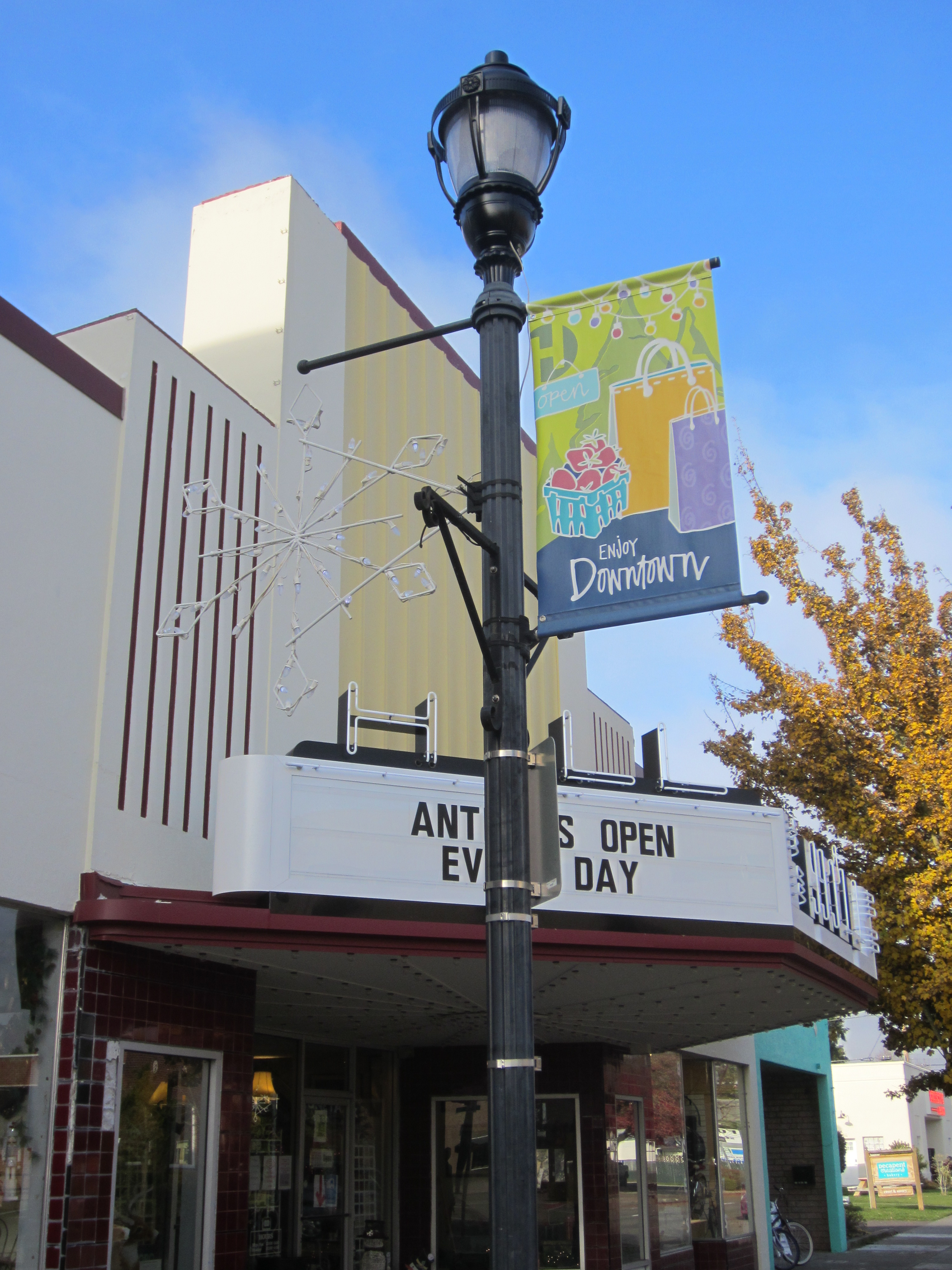
Hill Theatre, now an antique mall

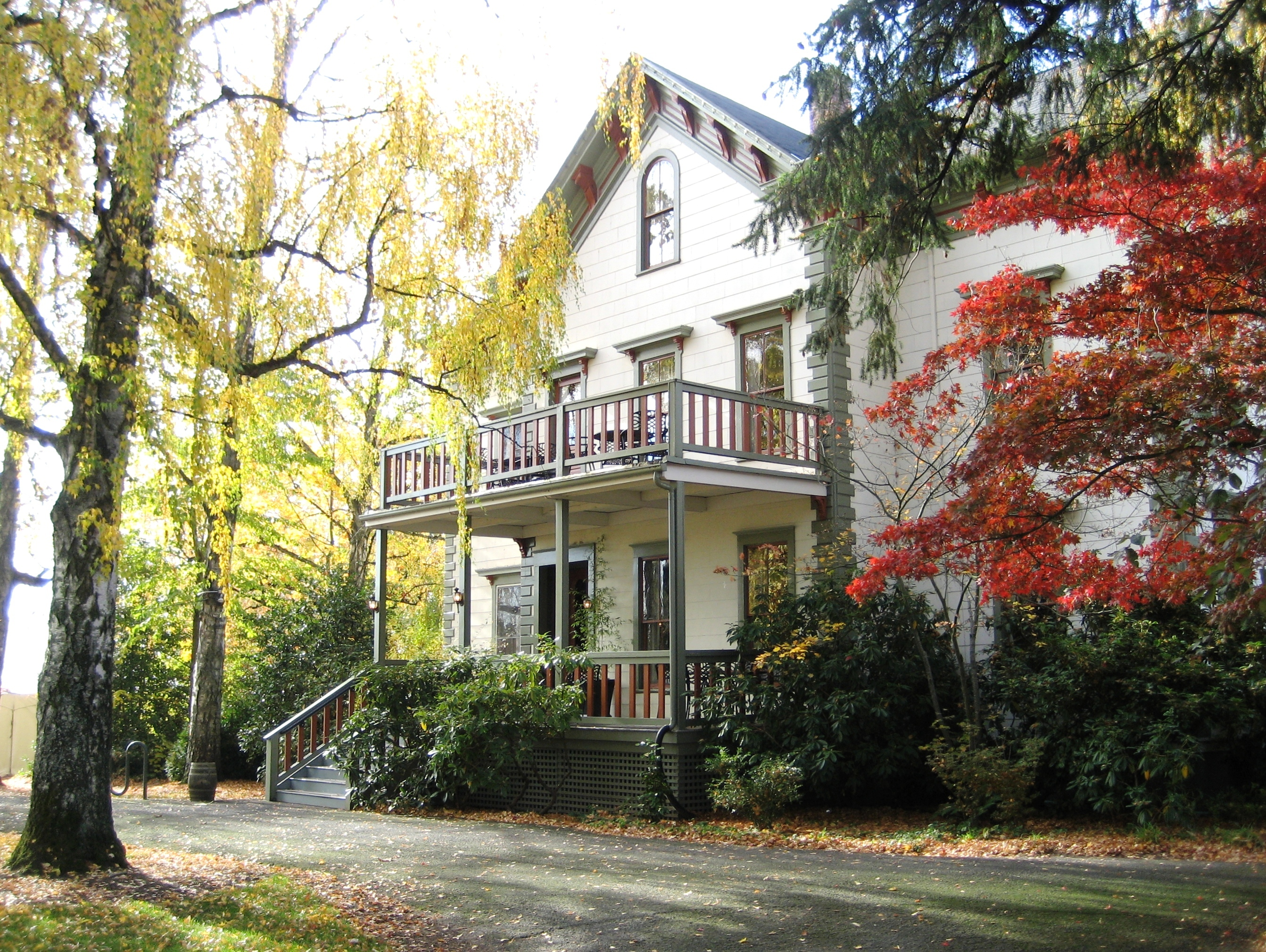
The Imbrie House

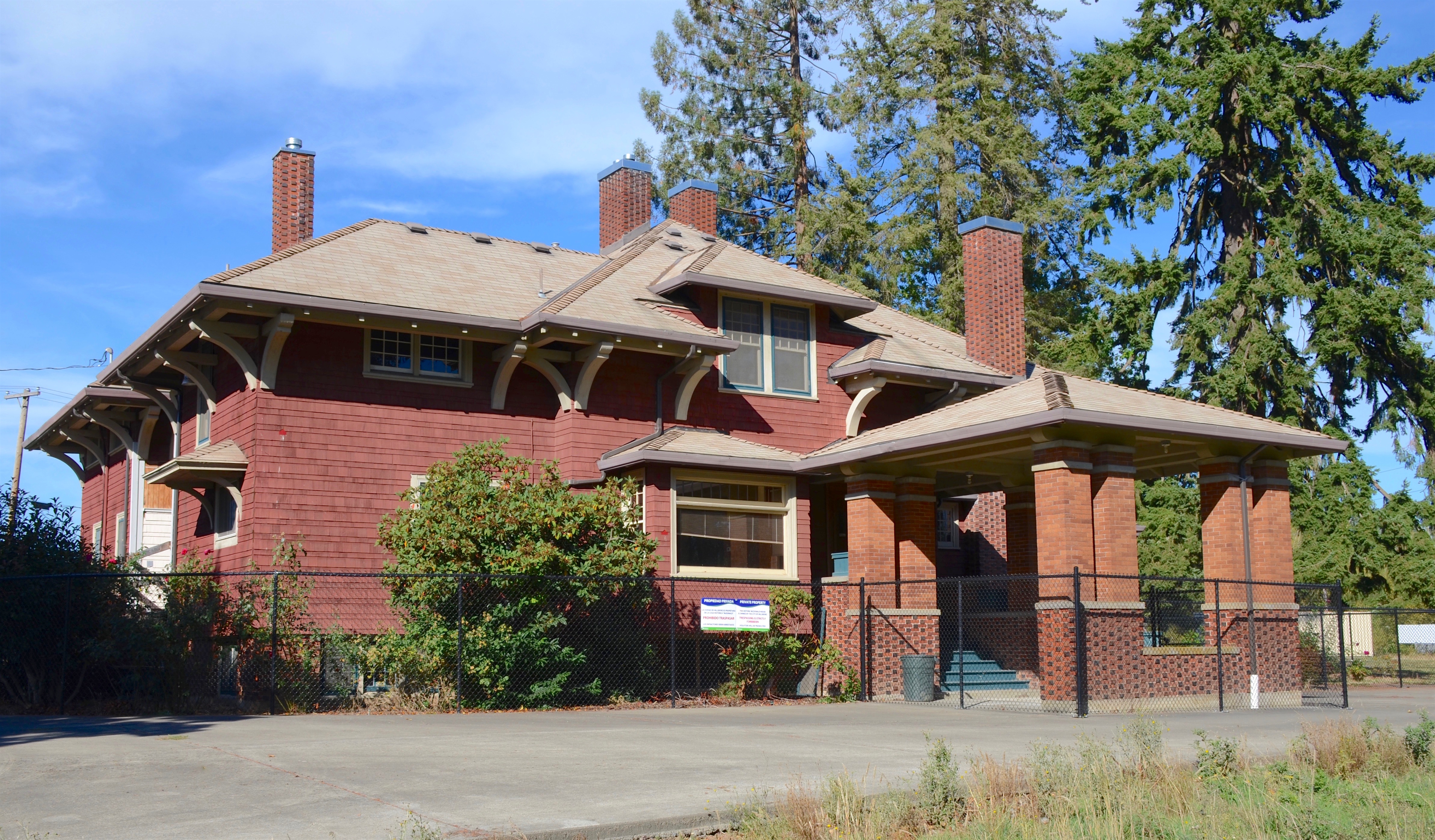
Malcolm McDonald House

== Sports ==
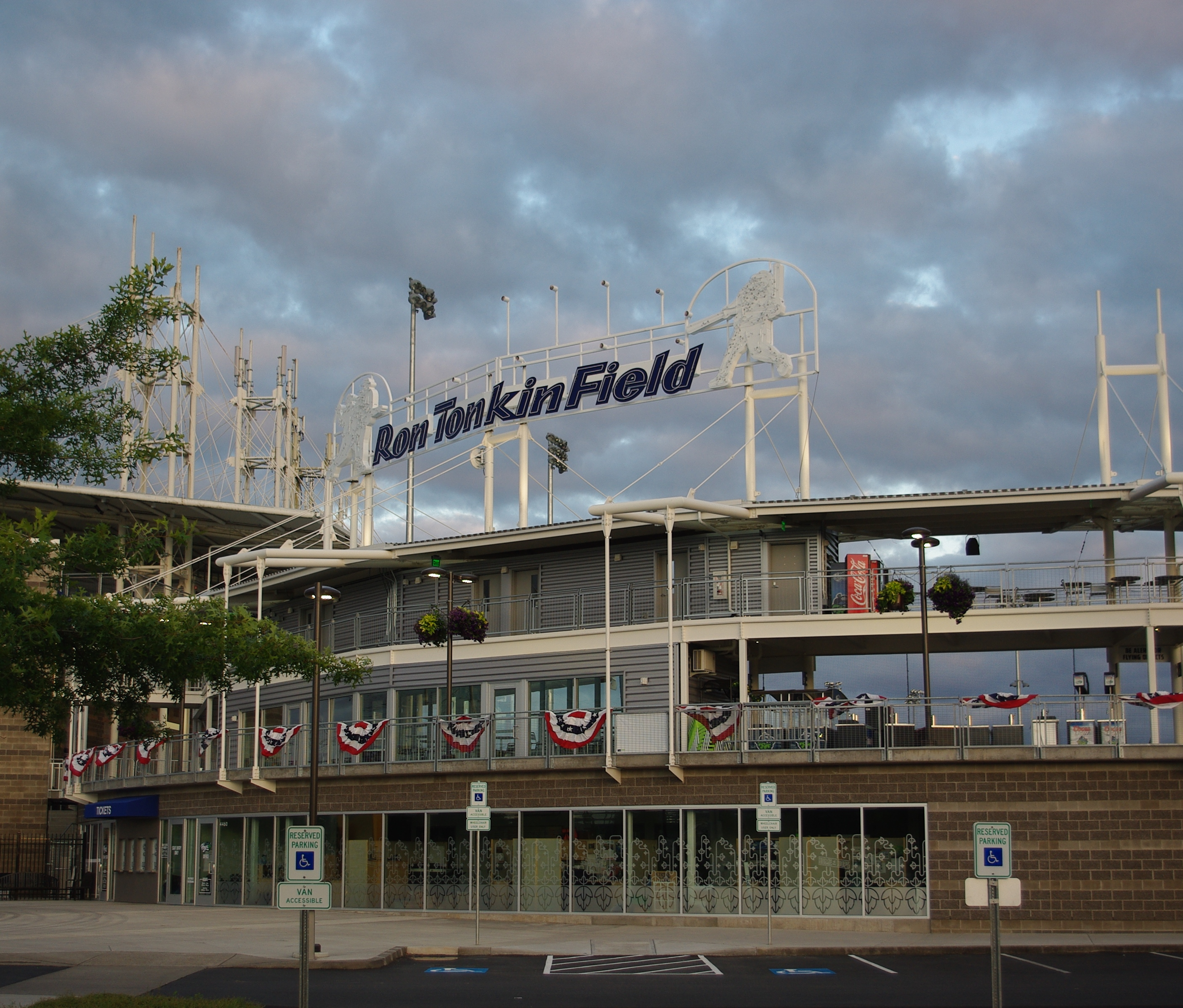
Hillsboro Ballpark (formerly Ron Tonkin Field)

The city has two professional sports teams, the Hillsboro Hops of the Northwest League, a Minor League Baseball club affiliated with the Arizona Diamondbacks, and the Portland Cascade of the Athletes Unlimited Softball League, who play at Hops former stadium, Hillsboro Ballpark. The baseball team relocated from Yakima, Washington, in 2012 and began play as the Hops on June 14, 2013, with its inaugural home game at the new Ron Tonkin Field on June 17, 2013. In 2026 the Hillsboro Hops moved into their new stadium, the Hillsboro Hops Ballpark, adjacent to the old one. The Portland Timbers 2 (T2) of MLS Next Pro played at Hillsboro Stadium from 2020 to 2022.

At the college level, the city's Gordon Faber Recreation Complex where Hillsboro Stadium, Hillsboro Ballpark, and Hillsboro Hops Ballpark are all located, has served as the home stadiums for Portland State University's football team, women's soccer, and softball teams. Oregon State University plays baseball games in Hillsboro as well against the Oregon Ducks and the Portland Pilots. Both the Ducks and the Beavers have previously held spring scrimmages at Hillsboro Stadium. That stadium is also the usual host for the OSAA high school football playoffs for the 6A and 5A classifications.

== Parks and recreation ==
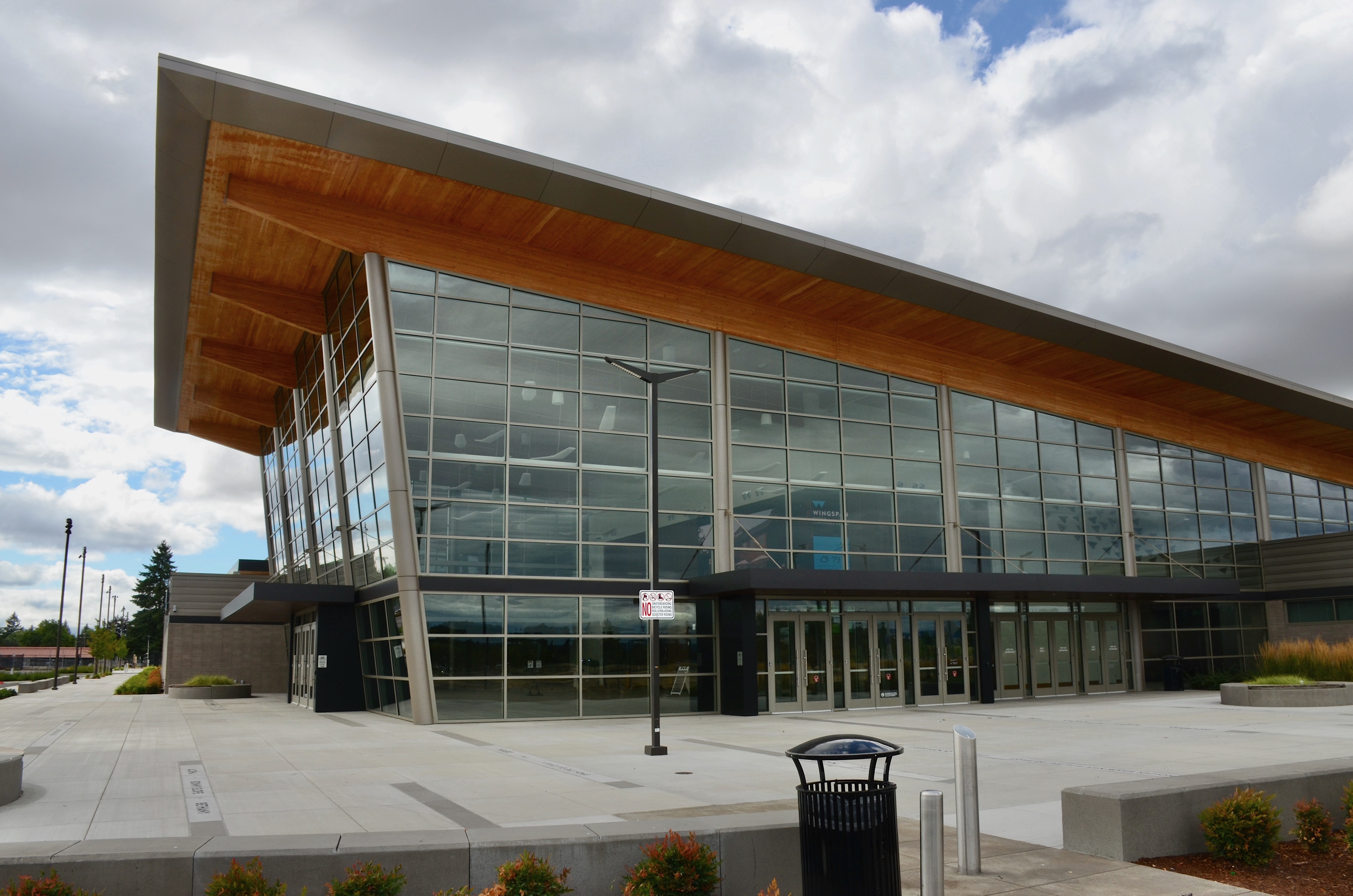
The Wingspan Event and Conference Center was completed in 2020 at the Westside Commons (formerly Washington County Fairgrounds) and hosts the annual county fair, among other events.

Hillsboro's Department of Parks and Recreation operates more than 20 facilities, including the Gordon Faber Recreation Complex, which includes Hillsboro Stadium, Hillsboro Ballpark (formerly Ron Tonkin Field), and the Hillsboro Hops Ballpark. There are 23 parks, two sports complexes, the Walters Cultural Arts Center, the Shute Park Aquatic & Recreation Center, and three other mixed-use facilities. The city also owns the Jackson Bottom Wetlands Preserve along the Tualatin River on the south side of the community.

== Government ==
Hillsboro operates under a council–manager form of city government. Voters elect six at-large councilors and a mayor, who each serve four-year terms, subject to a charter-imposed limitation of two consecutive terms. The mayor and council appoint a city manager to conduct the ordinary business of the city. Policy decisions are the responsibility of the council and mayor. Administrative functions are carried out by the manager and manager-appointed staff. Government functions are centered at the Hillsboro Civic Center, which houses the office of the city manager and is the location of the twice-monthly city council meetings. As of 2025, Beach Pace was the mayor; Olivia Alcaire, Kipperlyn Sinclair, Saba Anvery, Elizabeth Case, and Rob Harris were the city councilors. Robby Hammond serves as the city's manager.

At the federal level, Hillsboro lies in Oregon's 1st congressional district, represented by Suzanne Bonamici. In the State Senate, Hillsboro is in District 15, represented by Chuck Riley, District 13, represented by Kim Thatcher, and District 12 represented by Brian Boquist. In the House, Districts 24 (Ron Noble), 26 (Courtney Neron Misslin), 29 (Susan McClain) and 30 (Janeen Sollman) cover the city. Parts of county commissioner districts 1 (Nafisa Fai), 2 (Pam Treece), and 4 (Jerry Willey) overlap the city. In addition, Hillsboro lies within District 4 (Juan Carlos González) and District 3 (Gerritt Rosenthal) of the Metro regional government.

== Education ==
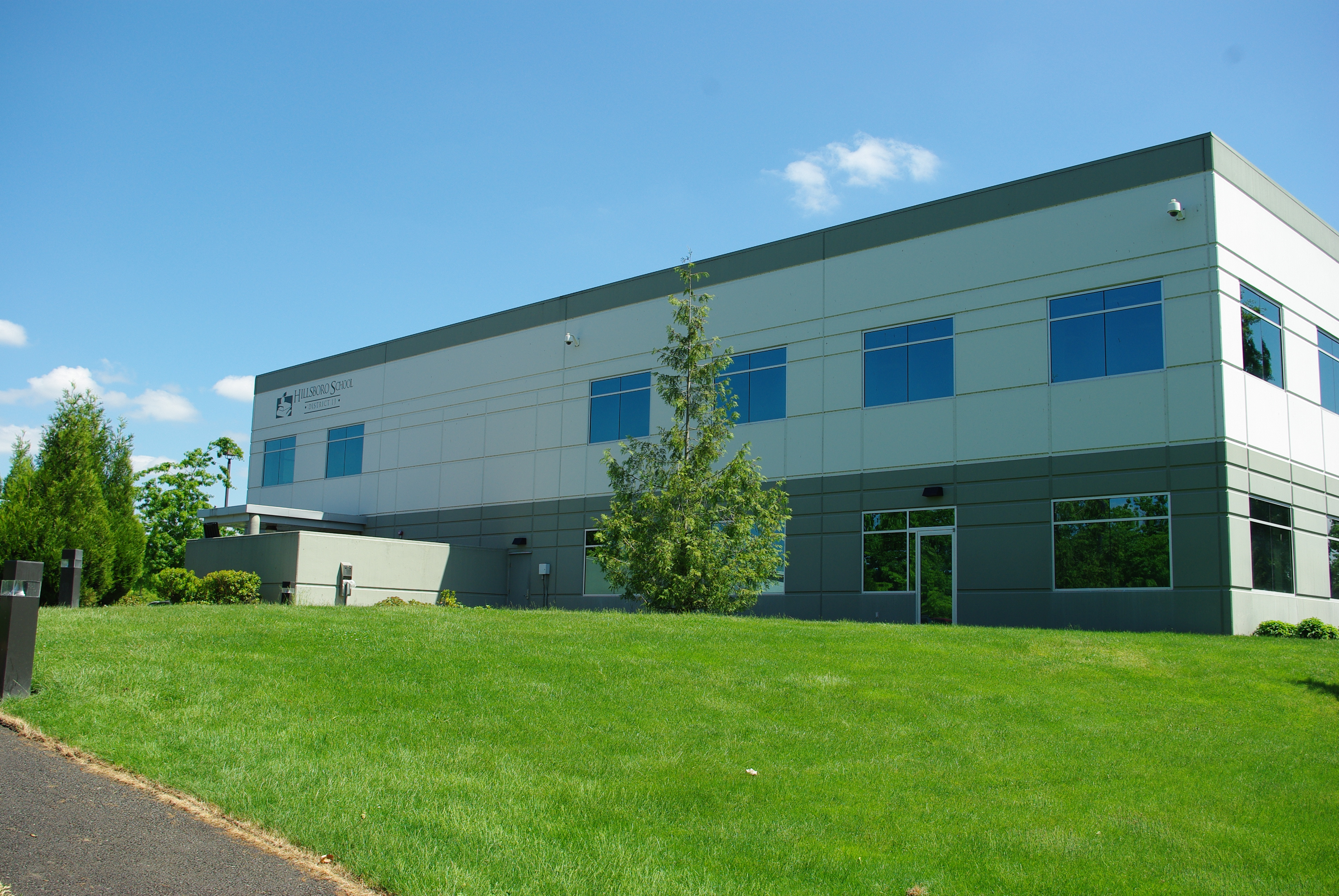
Hillsboro School District headquarters

Public schools in Hillsboro are operated by the Hillsboro School District (1J). The district is a unified school district with twenty-three elementary schools, four middle schools, and four high schools. The district also operates the Miller Education Center, an alternative school, the Hare Field athletic complex, and City View Charter School. The school district covers Hillsboro, Scholls, Reedville, North Plains, West Union, and other surrounding communities. Total enrollment as of the 2022–23 school year was 18,872 students, making it the fourth-largest district in the state (behind Portland, Salem-Keizer, and Beaverton). The four traditional public high schools are, in order of creation:

Name	Current campus	Enrollment (2022–23)	Nickname
Hillsboro High School	1969	1,322	Spartans
Glencoe High School	1980	1,452	Crimson Tide
Century High School	1997	1,533	Jaguars
Liberty High School	2003	1,483	Falcons

Post-secondary educational opportunities include the west campus of Oregon Health & Science University (OHSU) while Pacific University operates a satellite Health Professions Campus in downtown adjacent to Tuality Community Hospital. The OHSU site was formerly that of the Oregon Graduate Institute (later OGI School of Science and Engineering) and the Oregon National Primate Research Center portions of OHSU. Other educational opportunities are available at the Work Force Training Center (Portland Community College) and a branch of the University of Phoenix. Hillsboro is home to private primary and secondary schools including Faith Bible High School, St. Matthew Catholic School, Tualatin Valley Academy, and Renaissance Alternative School, among others.

== Media ==
The weekly Hillsboro Tribune, launched in 2012, was based in Hillsboro. It was replaced in 2019 by a Hillsboro edition of the News-Times, a weekly newspaper owned by the same company and based in nearby Forest Grove. Historically, the city's longtime newspaper of record was the weekly Hillsboro Argus newspaper (published twice-weekly from 1953 to 2015). It was published in Hillsboro for more than 120 years until its discontinuation in 2017.

The city is also served by Portland-based media outlets, including The Oregonian, Willamette Week, and all broadcast stations. Local FM radio station KQRZ-LP airing Oldies on 100.7 MHz is licensed by the FCC to Hillsboro and is simulcast on 96.7 MHz KICN-LP. AM radio station KUIK was based in Hillsboro until sold in 2018. KUIK was a 5,000-watt station broadcasting at the 1360 frequency.

== Infrastructure ==
=== Transportation ===
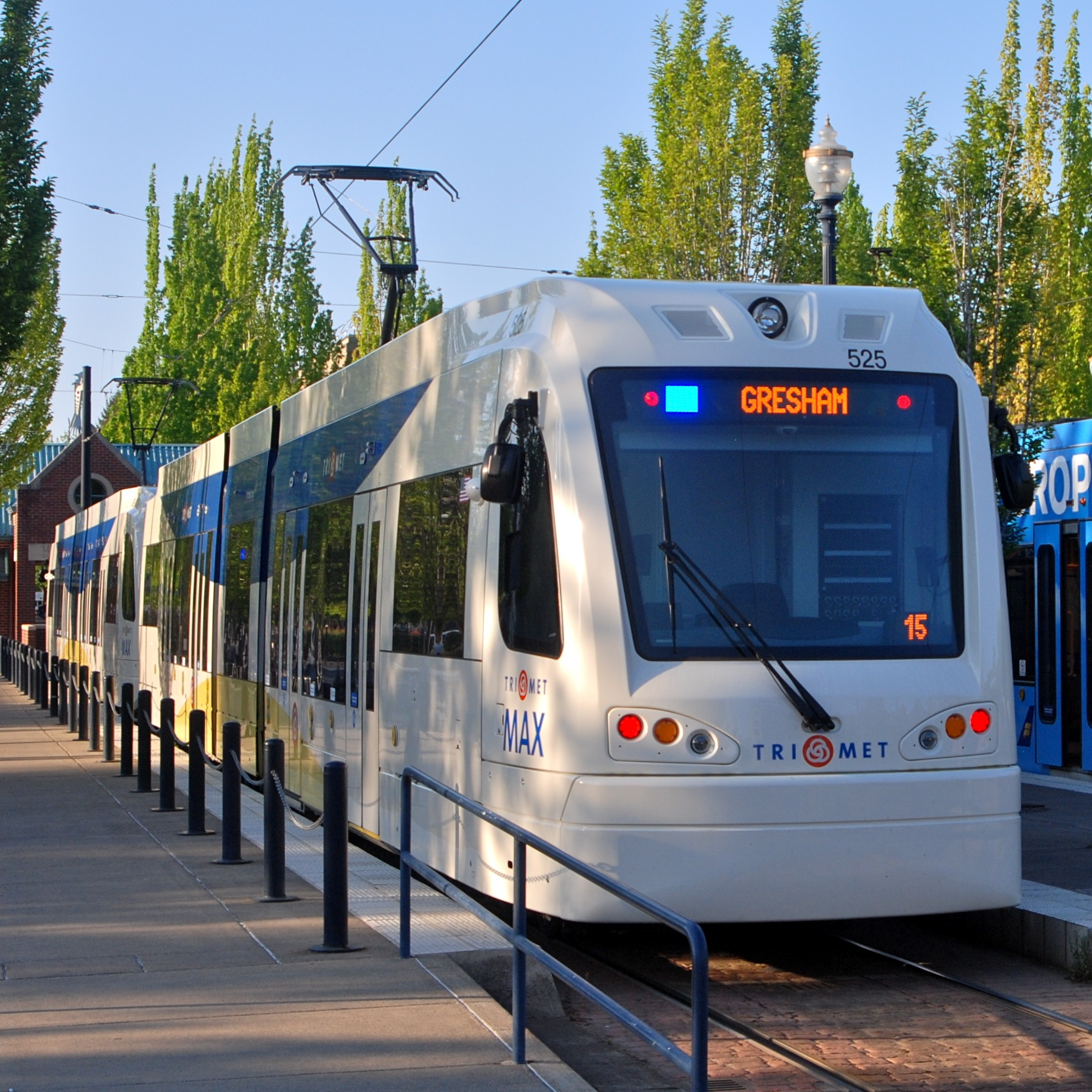
The western terminus of the MAX Blue Line at the Hatfield Government Center Station

Public transportation is available by bus and light rail, managed by regional transit agency TriMet. The first MAX Light Rail line, now known as the Blue Line, was extended to serve Hillsboro on September 12, 1998. The western terminus is located downtown. The Willow Creek and Hillsboro transit centers (TC) are the main hubs of the public transit system, although seven other MAX stations provide varying degrees of bus interconnection. MAX stations (west to east) are the Hatfield Government Center, Hillsboro Central TC, Hillsboro Health District, Washington/Southeast 12th Avenue, Hillsboro Airport/Fairgrounds, Hawthorn Farm, Orenco, Quatama, and Willow Creek TC. Located next to the Tuality Hospital station is the Hillsboro Intermodal Transit Facility, which opened in 2010 and was jointly paid for by the hospital, Pacific University, and the city. The facility is primarily a parking garage, but includes lockers and showers for bicyclists along with electric vehicle charging stations. The MAX Red Line was also extended in 2024 from Beaverton Transit Center to the Fairgrounds station.

Freight rail service from Portland and Western Railroad with interconnections to the BNSF Railway and the Union Pacific Railroad both serve Hillsboro. The city is not served by passenger rail service over a heavy-rail line. Air travel is available at the Hillsboro Airport in the center of the city and at Stark's Twin Oaks Airpark, a general aviation field south of the city. The Hillsboro Airport is a general aviation airport operated by the Port of Portland, and is the second-busiest airport in the state after Portland International Airport. The airport mainly serves private pilots and corporate flights, with no scheduled airline flights from its two runways, but does have an on-call customs service.

Oregon Route 8, known locally as the Tualatin Valley Highway (TV Highway), is the primary east–west highway. U.S. Route 26, also known as the Sunset Highway, bisects the northeast corner of the city. Other major east–west roads are Cornell Road and Main Street (formerly Baseline Road). Major north–south routes are Oregon Route 219 / 1st Avenue, 10th Avenue, Cornelius Pass Road, and Brookwood Parkway. The easternmost north–south route, 185th Avenue, borders Beaverton and runs between the Tanasbourne Town Center and the rest of Hillsboro. TV Highway connects to Cornelius and Forest Grove to the west and Beaverton to the east.

=== Services ===
Hillsboro operates its own library system, fire department, parks department, water system, police department, and municipal internet service. The Hillsboro Fire Department has six stations, and the Hillsboro Police Department operates two standard precincts and a mobile precinct. Wastewater treatment is provided through the county-wide Clean Water Services. The city's municipal internet service, HiLight, was initially launched in 2020 and expects to cover all households by 2027.

=== Health care ===
Hospital services in the city are provided by Hillsboro Medical Center (formerly Tuality Community Hospital) in the downtown area of the city. Opened in 1918 as the city's first hospital, the 167-bed facility is operated by Tuality Healthcare. Other significant medical facilities include Kaiser Permanente's Sunset Medical Office and Providence Health & Services' immediate care center, both in the Tanasbourne neighborhood. Kaiser Permanente also opened the Kaiser Westside Medical Center, a 126-bed hospital in 2013, next to its Sunset Medical Office. The Department of Veterans Affairs opened a medical clinic in the Tanasbourne area in 2008.

== Notable people ==
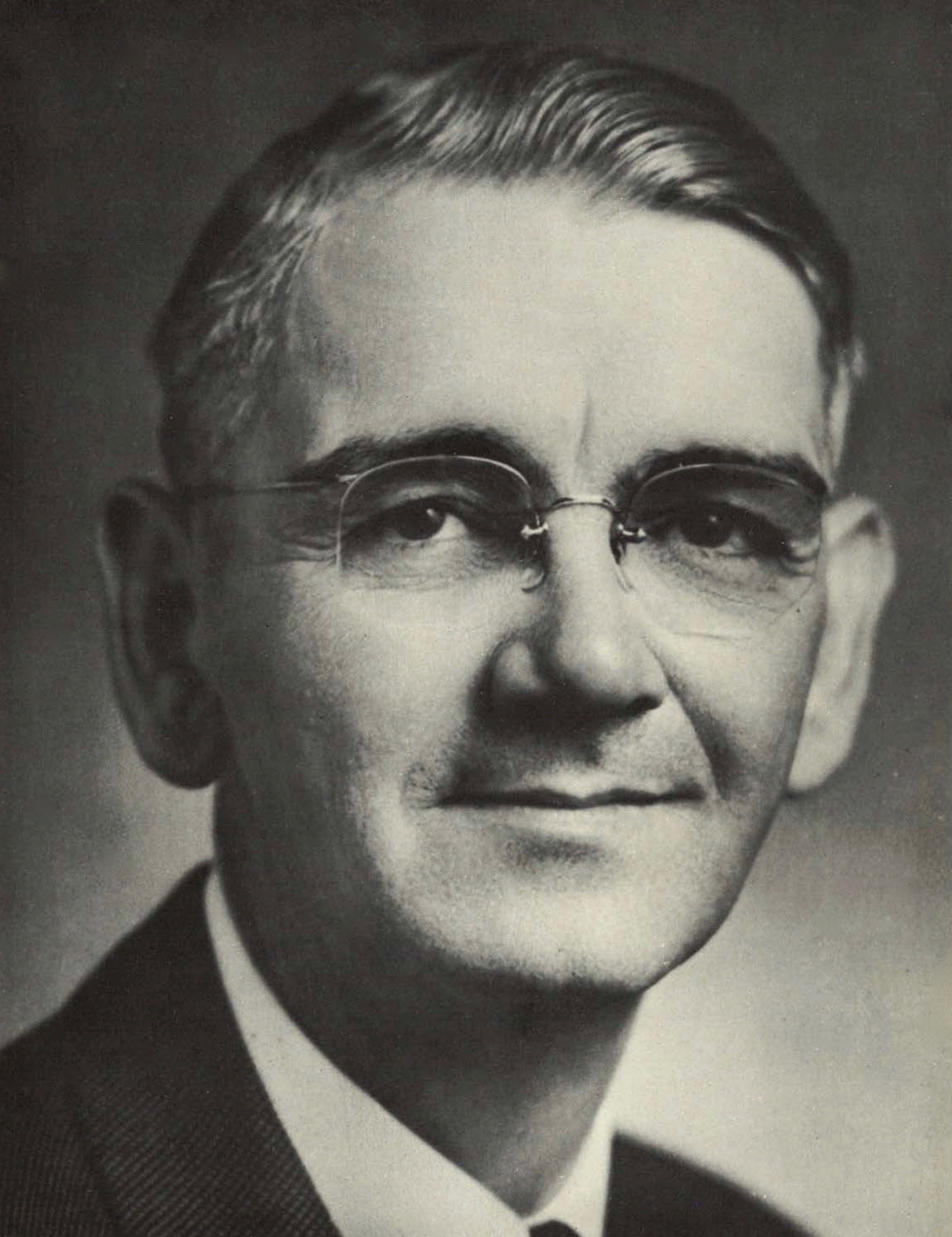
Governor Paul Patterson, namesake of an elementary school

For more than 150 years, the city has had residents as varied as David Hill, the city's founder, to Tiffeny Milbrett, an Olympic and World Cup champion soccer player. Sydney Collins is a player for the Canada national soccer team. Two governors of Oregon, James Withycombe and Paul L. Patterson, have called the city home. Other politicians included Congressmen Thomas H. Tongue and Samuel Thurston; mayors William N. Barrett, Benjamin P. Cornelius, and William D. Hare, patriarch of the Hare political family.

Athletes include Erik Ainge, Tiffeny Milbrett, Scott Brosius, Colt Lyerla, Bob Beall, Wes Schulmerich, and Olympic medalists Josh Inman, Thomas Garrigus, and Jean Saubert. Coaches have included Scott Rueck, Ad Rutschman, and Wally Backman. Hillsboro has also been home to Peggy Y. Fowler, the former chief executive officer of Portland General Electric, producer Bryce Zabel, the "Mother Queen of Oregon" Mary Ramsey Wood, businesswoman Judi Hofer, Tommy Overstreet, musician Esperanza Spalding and professional wrestler Roddy Piper. Serial killer Cesar Barone (convicted of four murders) also lived in the city when captured in 1993.

== Sister city ==
Hillsboro's only sister city relationship is with Fukuroi, a city of about 85,000 residents in the Shizuoka Prefecture in central Japan. The cities, which have similar economic bases in agriculture and high technology, began their relationship in November 1988. The relationship has included exchanges of students between schools in each city. In the late 2000s, Hillsboro unsuccessfully explored finding a sister city in Mexico and also neglected the relationship with Fukuroi. However, in 2008, a Fukuroi contingent of adults visited Hillsboro to celebrate the 20th anniversary of the Sister City agreement.
