= KXMG =

KXMG may refer to:

- KICN-LP, a low-power radio station (96.7 FM) licensed to serve Portland, Oregon, United States, which held the call sign KXMG-LP from 2017 to 2018
- KNOL (FM), a radio station (107.5 FM) licensed to serve Jean Lafitte, Louisiana, United States, which held the call sign KXMG from 2011 to 2015
- KXET (AM), a defunct radio station (1150 AM) formerly licensed to Portland, Oregon, which held the KXMG call sign from February 2005 to April 2009
- KNMF, a radio station (93.3 FM) licensed to Cedar Park, Texas, United States, which held the KXMG call sign from August 2001 to August 2003
- KMPC, a radio station (1540 AM) licensed to Los Angeles, California, United States, which held the KXMG call sign from March 1996 to December 1997
- KOHT, a radio station (98.3 FM) licensed to Marana, Arizona, United States, which held the KXMG call sign from October 1985 to June 1992
