= Charles Shorey House =

Historic house in Oregon, United States

- U.S. National Register of Historic Places
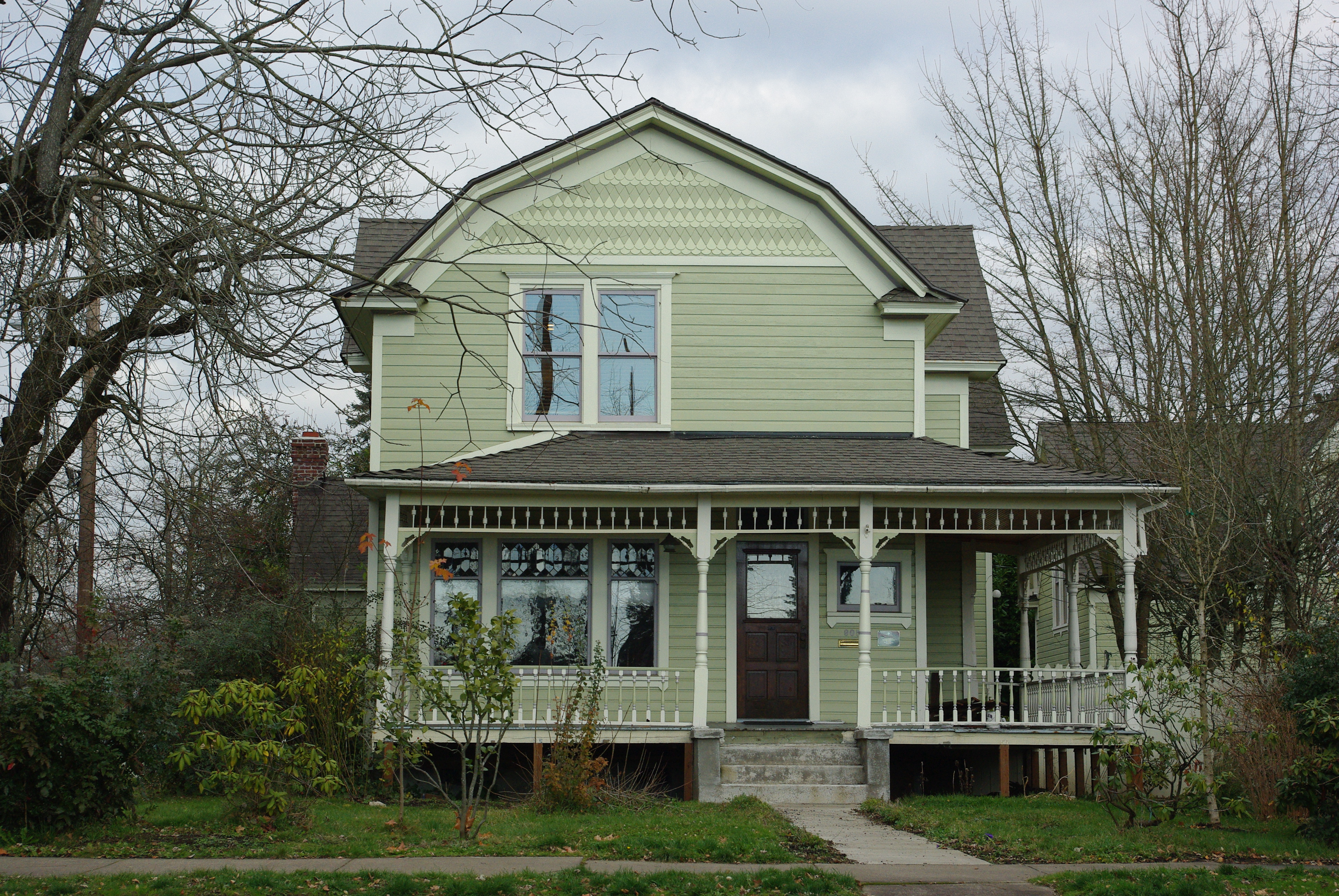
- Front of building in 2009

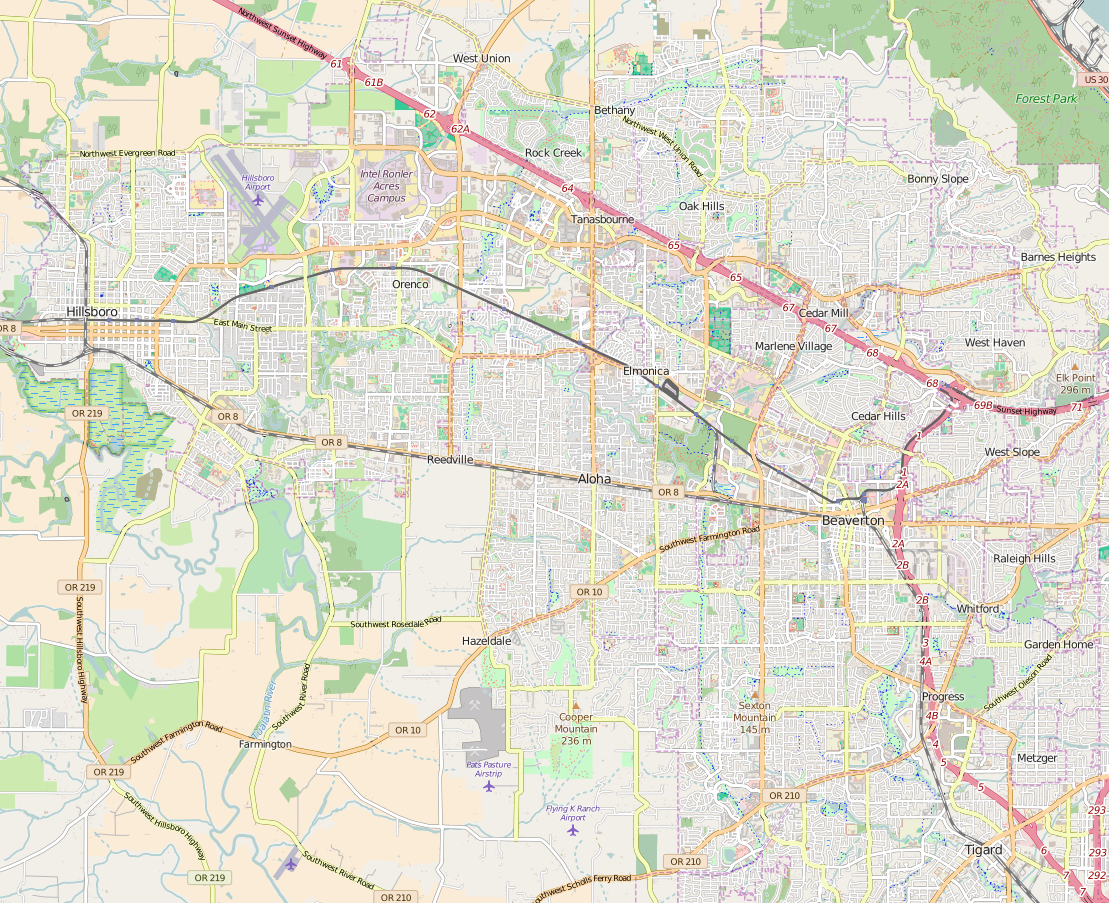
- Location within Hillsboro Beaverton OR Location within Oregon Location within the United States
- Location: Hillsboro, Oregon, USA
- Coordinates: 45°31′20″N 122°58′31″W
- Built: c. 1908
- Architectural style: Queen Anne
- NRHP reference No.: 89000518
- Added to NRHP: June 16, 1989

The Charles Shorey House is a two-story wood home on Main Street in downtown Hillsboro, Oregon, United States. Completed about 1908, the Queen Anne style structure was built by Charles Shorey. The building was added to the National Register of Historic Places in 1989.

== History ==
Charles Shorey was born in 1850 in Waterville, Maine, and moved to Washington County, Oregon, in 1878. Around 1908 he purchased 1.7 acres (6,900 m^{2}) on Main Street in Hillsboro from Wesley W. Boscow for $857. Formerly part of the Boscow Dairy Farm, Shorey used the land to build a home for his family. Once complete he moved the family from their homestead near Mountaindale on Dairy Creek. The family included his wife Sarah and daughter Eliza Jane.

A carpenter, Charles died in 1934 followed by Sarah in 1938. The home remained in the family with Eliza living there until she died in the 1950s. She preserved the home, and later owners renovated the house in 1987. By 1989 the Slansky family owned the property, and on June 16 of that year the house was added to the National Register of Historic Places as an example of a middle class home from turn of the century Hillsboro.

== Details ==
The home is a cross-shaped structure featuring the mixture of both a gambrel roof and a gable roof. Primarily Queen Anne in style, the two-story wood building also has features of the Colonial Revival style. The exterior contains horizontal board siding, some fish-scale shingles, a wraparound porch, and other decorative accents. These accents include jigsawn brackets and turned-posts on the porch.

Much of the exterior remains as it was with the original building materials still intact, including lead windows. The interior is also largely in original condition including the main stairway that has turned balusters. Fir wainscot is present throughout most of the home, which the interior design is of an Arts and Crafts style design.
