= Hillsboro wireless tower =

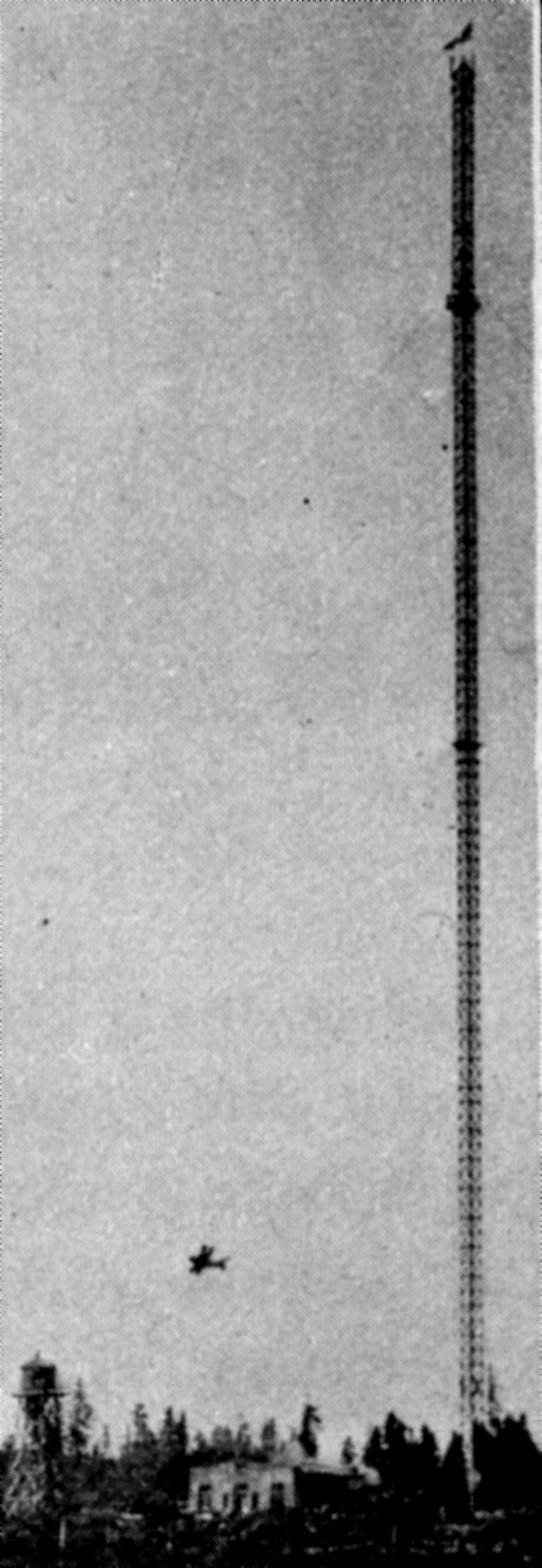
- The tower near Hillsboro with airplane showing scale
- Interactive map of the Hillsboro wireless tower area

General information
- Architectural style: steel tower
- Location: Hillsboro, Oregon, United States
- Coordinates: 45.485502°N 122.9527°W
- Construction started: 1920
- Completed: 1921
- Demolished: 1952
- Cost: $300,000
- Client: Federal Telegraph Company

Technical details
- Size: 626 feet tall

Design and construction
- Engineer: J.L. Miller

The Hillsboro wireless tower was a wireless telegraph station south of Hillsboro, Oregon, United States. Located adjacent to what is now Meriwether National Golf Club, at the time it was the second tallest steel tower in the world after France’s Eiffel Tower. The tower was constructed in 1921 and was torn down in 1952.

== History ==
Federal Telegraph Company purchased property south of Hillsboro on September 20, 1920, from the Fred Rood estate, with completion of the project coming in 1921. Federal paid $41,500 for the 331-acre (134 ha) site that was then three miles from Hillsboro. The tower was built to replace a tower the federal government owned in Lents that the government removed and sent to Siberia during World War I. The dedication of telegraph station KGH came on May 11, 1921, with a crowd of 500 and the Hillsboro mayor, A. C. Shute, in attendance. Built on 330 acres (1.3 km^{2}) the station had one large tower at a height of 626 feet (191 m) surrounded by eight shorter towers arranged in a circle around the main tower in the center. Once complete, it was the tallest structure on the Pacific Coast, and the only taller structures in the world were the Eiffel Tower in France and the Woolworth Building in New York City.

Workers dug out 14 feet (4.3 m) deep concrete bases to secure the towers under the guidance of the engineer J. L. Miller. Constructed of steel, the station cost $300,000 to build. KGH used synchronous rotary spark gap transmitters. A 3 kW set for close ships and a 5 kW transmitter for ships far out at sea. A receiving set was installed on top of "The Board of Trade" building in Portland, Oregon. Transmission lines were placed between the Hillsboro transmitter site and Federal's Portland offices.

In September 1927, KGH was purchased by Mackay Radio & Telegraph Company, a subsidiary of International Telephone & Telegraph Corporation. Mackay Radio shortly thereafter installed a shortwave transmitter and replaced one of the spark gap transmitters with the new arc and tube type. On December 31, 1928, Mackay Radio announced a new more powerful transmitter would be installed by February 1929, making KGH the most powerful Marine Radio station in the Northwest. In April of that year the new transmitter was put into use by Mackay.

In October 1935, a strike by employees of Mackay caused the transmitter to go dead. During World War II the United States government took over the operations of the station. It was then operated by the United States Coast Guard. In 1951, the station was abandoned and subsequently torn down in 1952.

== Details ==
The tower was operated remotely from Portland, Oregon and was capable of sending telegraph message as far away as Asia and Europe. The eight smaller towers were 1,500 feet (460 m) from the central tower. Utilizing short-wave radio signals, the station would transmit point-to-point to regional transmitters such as in San Francisco, California or directly to ships at sea. On site was also a large concrete building 60 feet (18 m) by 80 feet (24 m) and 20 feet (6.1 m) tall. In addition to this, on July 9, 1923, KEK began operation. The Marine receiving station was licensed to Hillsboro but was located in a building on Council Crest in Portland and the main office was in the Postal Building in downtown Portland. This downtown building is where all messages were received and relayed. The cables supporting the towers were one and one-quarter inch in diameter.

KEK had four long wave receivers. Two for ship work and two for shortwave reception. Three of four signals from Federal's San Francisco operating room (KFS transmitter in Palo Alto, California) were picked up simultaneously by KEK and passed down to the main office in Portland where the operating room was located. The signals came in on a long wavelength automatically and were received on a paper tape. Operators then transcribed the signals from the tape directly on telegraph blank cards, ready for delivery at a speed of 40 to 80 words per minute over KGH.

As reported in The Oregon Journal newspaper in 1923: "Portland is one of the very few cities in the world that has a complete ship to ship and point to point radio service. KEK receives news day and night of ships carrying loved ones, news of ships in trouble. Vessels 1,000 miles at sea report their positions nightly or might request medical aid."
