= VSNL Transpacific =

System of submarine telecommunications cables

TGN-Pacific (TGN-P, previously VSNL Transpacific) is a submarine telecommunications cable system transiting the Pacific Ocean.

The cable system is constructed with one cable from Emi, Japan, to Hillsboro, Oregon, United States; one from Toyohashi, Japan, to Hillsboro; one from Toyohashi, Japan, to Los Angeles, California, United States; and one from Toyohashi to Guam. The cables between Japan and Hillsboro are each constructed with 8 fibre pairs per cable. At construction the cable could support up to 96 10 Gbit/s waves in its 2001 configuration. In 2014 the cable was upgraded to 100G optical transport.

It has landing points in:

- Emi, Kamogawa City, Chiba Prefecture, Japan
- Toyohashi, Aichi Prefecture, Japan
- Piti, Guam
- Nedonna Beach, Tillamook County near Hillsboro, Washington County, Oregon, United States (two cable landing points)
- Hermosa Beach, Los Angeles County, California, United States

Tata Communications (formerly VSNL) acquired the cable from its builder Tyco in May, 2005.
