= City View Charter School =

Location
- 1920 NE Stucki Ave; Hillsboro, Washington County, Oregon 97006; United States

Information
- Type: Public charter
- Opened: 2004
- School district: Hillsboro School District
- Principal: Nicole Kopacz
- Teaching staff: 10.25 (FTE)
- Grades: K-8
- Enrollment: 300 (2023)
- Student to teacher ratio: 18.54
- Mascot: wolf
- Rival: none
- Website: cityviewcharter.org
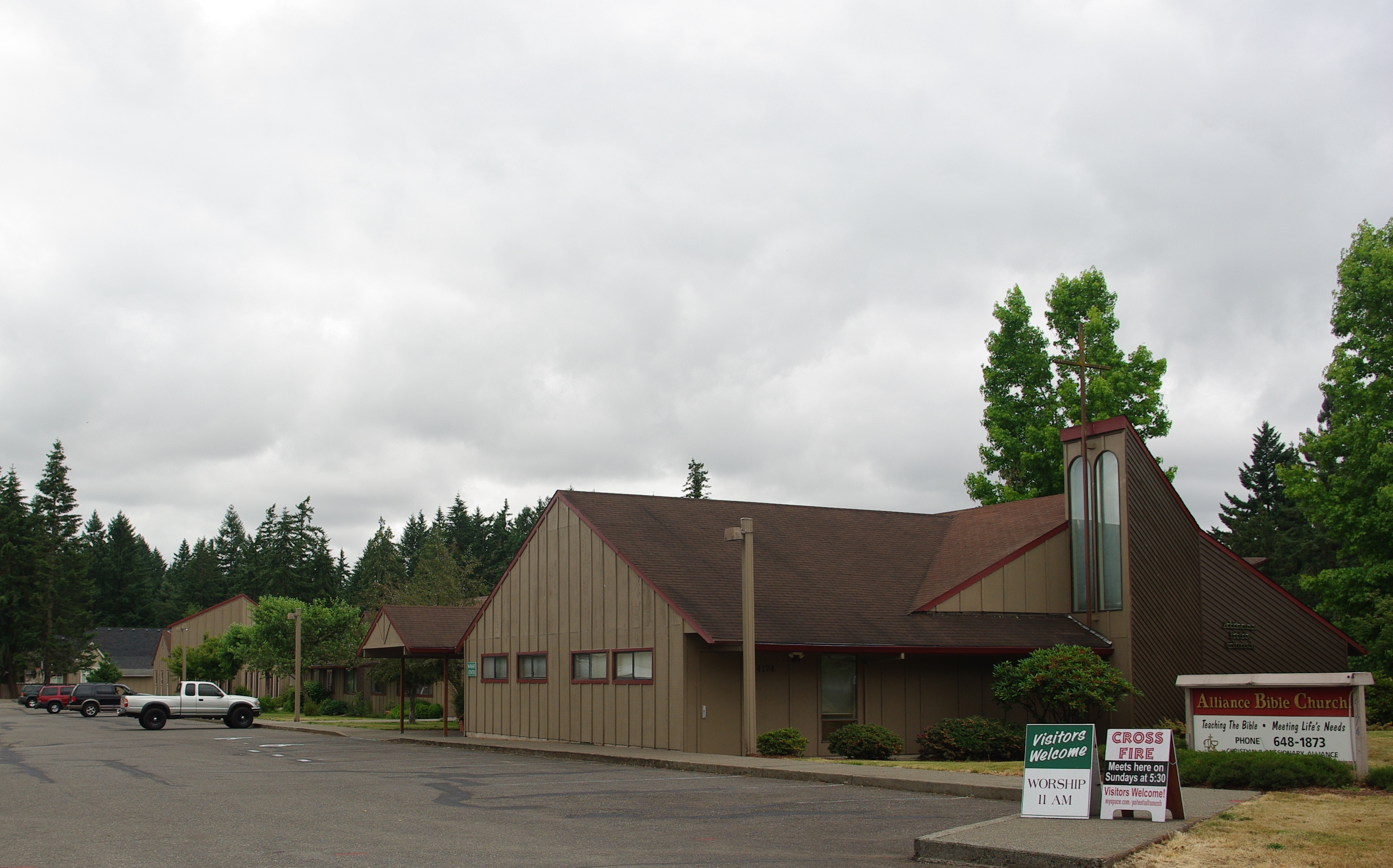
- Former location at the Alliance Bible Church

City View Charter School is a public charter school in Hillsboro, Oregon, United States. Opened in 2004, the school is authorized by the Hillsboro School District and offers kindergarten through eighth grades. Curriculum is based on the hands-on project based instruction model Expeditionary Learning developed by Outward Bound. City View is the first charter school in Hillsboro and has an approximate enrollment of 149 students.

== History ==
Tonie and Kristopher Gomez presented a plan to the Hillsboro School District in March 2003 to establish a charter school using programs created by Outward Bound. The couple hoped the project-based teaching would be successful for their son, and hoped the planned school would open in fall 2004 with 100 students. The plan called for the school to eventually serve grades one through eight, starting with one through five the first year. Sixth grade would be added in year two, and the two remaining grades the following year. Class sizes were to be limited to 20 students per class according to the charter school application. The original plan also called for the school to be located at the old Witch Hazel Elementary building, but the decision to demolish the building to make way for a new intersection prevented the site from being considered.

School backers planned to secure federal funds and raise other money from private sources to go along with the state funding. The State of Oregon funds charter schools at 80% of the per-pupil rate provided to traditional schools. In June 2003, the Hillsboro school board conditionally approved City View Charter School's application, and the next month the school was approved for $350,000 in federal grants. The first $50,000 was approved for disbursement to help start the conditionally approved school, with the remaining amounts becoming available once the school opened. The school was the first charter school approved in Hillsboro. The condition set by the Hillsboro School Board was that the school and the district agree on a contract by February 2004.

City View and the district agreed on a three-year contract in January 2004 on condition the school sign a lease for a building by July 1. The contract, signed in February, also called for class sizes of 22 students or less, and allowed the school to open in September 2004 or 2005. By June 2004, the school had around 50 students enrolled and had hired three teachers. That month the school signed a lease to use a former childcare center along Tualatin Valley Highway. The 6,000-square-foot (560 m^{2}) building required a permit to operate a school in a residential area and a waiver for the city's requirement that schools have 1-acre (4,000 m^{2}) per 75 students. After receiving approval from the city, the school opened as the first charter school in Hillsboro in September 2004. When it opened, the school had 60 students, with second and third grade combined, and fourth and fifth grade combined, all fit into two classrooms total.

In October 2004, the school was having difficulty meeting several requirements of the Hillsboro school district concerning enrollment numbers and tracking expenses. The City View School Board then voted to remove executive director Tonie Gomez, but the vote failed, with one board member then resigning. After another board member resigned, an issue with having enough state-licensed teachers, bills were not paid on-time, and with enrollment dropping to 49 students, the executive director resigned effective in February 2005. John Bloss was named as the interim director of City View in February. In these early days, parents of students assisted the school with its operations by working in the office, helping with recruitment, and cleaning the school. By November 2006 the school grew to 154 students at two locations, the original building and at Brookwood Baptist Church on Main Street. That month the Hillsboro school board unanimously approved a new three-year charter for the school.

In 2008, Michelle Lorraine Wheeler, the school's bookkeeper, was accused of stealing from the school. Wheeler was convicted of embezzling from a charity while bookkeeping for the school. City View was not notified of Wheeler's conviction. As a condition of her probation Wheeler was required to notify all current and future clients in writing of her conviction. She resigned from her position in December 2008.

The missing money led the Hillsboro school board to declare the school in breach of contract as they questioned the school's financial stability. Wheeler was later charged with embezzling $91,000 from the school in 2006, and pleaded guilty to the charges in June 2008. She was sentenced to just under four years in prison for the thefts that started in September 2006 and included stealing in order to pay restitution for the earlier crime against her charity client. In June 2008, the Hillsboro school board determined the school was financially viable and rescinded their breach of contract. At that time the school had 155 students and began moving to a new single location at the Alliance Bible Church on Bentley Street.

In January 2015, the school requested the Hillsboro School Board to increase funding to 90% of state allocations per student, which was denied and to be allowed to double the enrollment while requesting a ten-year extension on the charter, which was approved. The school had 192 students at that time and had received funding at 80% up to that point.

The school moved from the Bible Church to Stucki Ave in April 2024.

In late 2024, the school got into controversy after they had talks of red-flagging "challenging kids".

== Academics ==
Students from City View come primarily from the Hillsboro School District, but enrollment is open to non-residents as well, though priority is given to district residents. The district is responsible for oversight on administrative and fiscal matters at the school. Funding comes to the school from the district, with the school receiving 80 percent of what the state pays per student and the district retaining the remaining 20 percent. Oregon's charter school law determines this rate, with schools receiving 95 percent for students in grades nine through twelve.

Students are required to take standardized tests administered by the state and must comply with the No Child Left Behind law. The curriculum of City View was developed by Outward Bound and is called expeditionary learning. The program uses theme based learning with an emphasis on field work by students. It also encourages communications and teamwork between the students.

As of 2010, the K-8, 149 student school was above the state average in eleven categories, and below the state average in four standardized test categories for reading, writing, math, and science at different grade levels. The school had an overall state achievement index score of 86 and a satisfactory rating, while the federal government rated the school as repeatedly has met all targets. Seventy-seven percent of the teachers held master's degrees or above and had been teaching an average of 2.7 years, with a total of 8.5 full-time equivalent teachers.

The school is criticized for having declining and below-average scores, despite being populated by fewer poor students and fewer non-English students. As of 2010, 79 percent of students were White, 10.5 percent Hispanic, 3.7 percent Asian, and 2.1 percent Black. In addition, the administration and charter school board has had high turnover.
