= Oregon Chorale =

Background information
- Origin: Hillsboro, Oregon, United States
- Genre: Concert choir
- Years active: 1985–present
- Members: Director; Jason Sabino (2015–present)
- Past members: Director; Bernd R. Kuehn (1985–2015)
- Website: www.oregonchorale.org

The Oregon Chorale is an American concert choir based in Hillsboro in the U.S. state of Oregon. Founded in 1985 as the Washington County Chorale, the 60 person group performs in the Portland metropolitan area, as well as tours in Europe. The group presents music ranging from classical and opera music to folk and contemporary numbers.

== History ==
Bernd R. Kuehn founded the group as the Washington County Chorale in 1985 as a 50-member choir. A German immigrant, he also directed choirs at Pacific University, Hillsboro High School, and Gaston High School. Beginning in 1989 they presented a musical or comedy in the spring every few years. In September 2002, Anne Avery was hired as the executive director of the group. The group teamed with both a Scandinavian and a Polish dance group in March 2003. Held at Hillsboro High School, "Many Voices, One World" featured folk songs sung by the Oregon Chorale with the two dance groups performing traditional dances.

In April 2005, the group premiered a musical comedy written by Linda Needham entitled "The Great Lewis & Clark Extravaganza of 1905 or Paddle Your Own Canoe". The musical was set at the 1905 Lewis and Clark Centennial Exposition in Portland. The group’s Christmas concert in December 2005 featured songs in Czech, Polish, Russian, and Latvian in addition to English. To prepare for a tour in Europe, the Oregon Chorale performed folk songs from Ireland and Scotland for St. Patrick’s Day in 2007.

By 2008, the group grew in size to include 60 singers. The chorale’s spring concert revolved around William Shakespeare in a concert titled as "The 409th Annual Night at the Globe Awards". That June and July the group toured in Europe with concerts in Ireland, Scotland, and Northern Ireland, including a performance at the Belfast Maritime Festival. The tour was the fifth for the group in Europe. The group debuted Another Right-Down Rollicking Evening With Gilbert & Sullivan from a local writer in 2012.

== Details ==
The Hillsboro-based group is made up of 60 people from across the Portland metropolitan area. A symphonic choir, they require auditions in order to join. Most members reside on the west side of the metro area, specifically in Hillsboro, Tigard, and Beaverton. The Oregon Chorale presents a holiday concert each December. Music performed by the group ranges from classical music from Johann Sebastian Bach, Antonio Vivaldi, and George Frideric Handel, to folk and other varieties of music from around the world. They have also presented a vocalise concert where no words are sung, and instead singers use vowel sounds. Performances are held at a variety of venues including Pacific University in Forest Grove, St. Matthew Catholic Church in Hillsboro, United Methodist Church in Tigard, and Liberty High School, among other locations in the Portland metropolitan area.
