= KQRZ-LP =

Low-power FM radio station in Hillsboro, Oregon

- Tigard, Oregon; United States
- Frequency: 100.7 MHz

Programming
- Format: Oldies
- Affiliations: Western Oregon Radio Club, Inc.

Ownership
- Owner: Oregon Amateur Radio Club, Inc. (OARC)
- Sister stations: KICN-LP, KISN-LP

History
- First air date: July 22, 2012
- Call sign meaning: Amateur radio Q Code: "Who is calling me?"

Technical information
- Licensing authority: FCC
- Facility ID: 134266
- Class: L1
- ERP: 100 watts
- HAAT: 23 meters (75 ft)
- Transmitter coordinates: 45°24′49″N 122°47′4″W

Links
- Public license information: LMS
- Webcast: Listen live
- Website: kqrz.org

KQRZ-LP (100.7 FM) is a low-power radio station licensed to Tigard, Oregon, United States. The station is owned by the Oregon Amateur Radio Club, Inc. KQRZ-LP signed on the air July 22, 2012, on an initial frequency of 101.5 MHz. On July 11, 2013, at 8:00 PM, KQRZ-LP changed the transmit frequency to 100.7 MHz, although the license to cover that frequency was not issued by the Federal Communications Commission until September 4, 2013. The OARC implemented a city of license change relocating the transmitter site from Hillsboro (Cooper Mountain (Oregon)) to Tigard Oregon on July 3, 2024.

On July 22, 2012, KQRZ undertook an affiliation with the WORC Oldies Network, which syndicates broadcast material to other low-power radio stations interested in amateur radio. Programming includes amateur (ham) radio news, educational material, comedy, oldies, and adult standard music.

KICN-LP (96.7 FM) and KZUN-LP (95.1 Helvetia) is simulcasting KQRZ.

Veteran disc jockey (DJ) "The Vegetable Man", who was local to Pacific Northwest radio in the 1960s, is also broadcast by the network with periodic shows daily.

== Fictional ==
The call letters of KQRZ were used for a fictional TV station in Los Angeles, California, in the Adam-12 television episode entitled Pick Up.
