= KICN-LP =

Low-power FM radio station in Portland, Oregon

Portland, Oregon; United States
- Broadcast area: Portland, Oregon
- Frequency: 96.7 MHz

Programming
- Language: English
- Format: Oldies

Ownership
- Owner: Vector Communications

Technical information
- Licensing authority: FCC
- Facility ID: 196547
- Class: 244LP1
- ERP: 10 watts
- HAAT: 95 meters (312 ft)

Links
- Public license information: LMS

KICN-LP is a low-power FM radio station broadcasting at 96.7 FM in Portland, Oregon, United States. It is licensed by the FCC to Vector Communications, and broadcasts an oldies format, acting as a repeater for KQRZ-LP.
