= Willow Creek Transit Center =

Railway station in Hillsboro, Oregon, US

Willow Creek/ SW 185th Ave TC
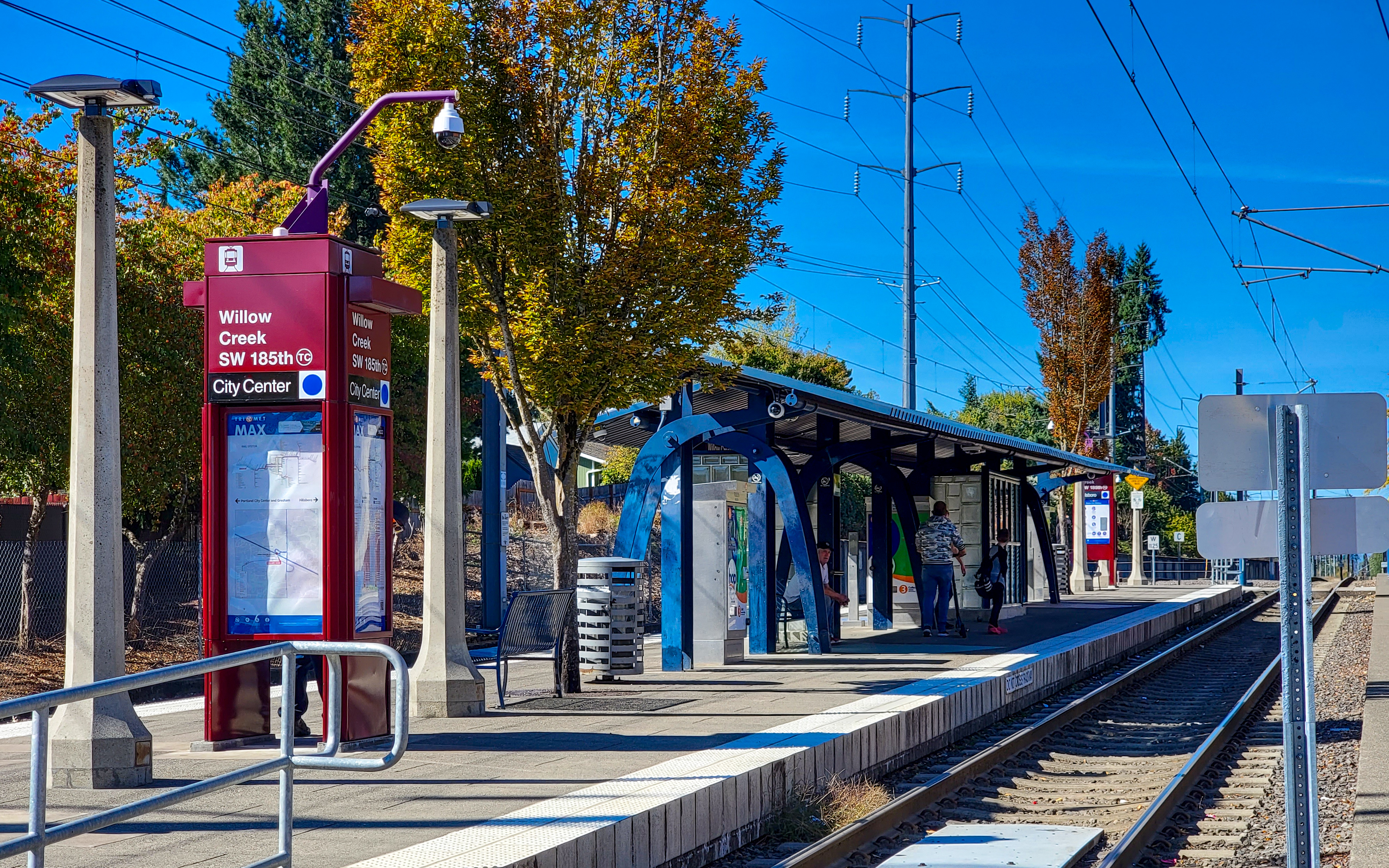
- The transit center's MAX platform in 2023, facing west

General information
- Location: 395 Southwest 185th Avenue; Hillsboro, Oregon, United States
- Coordinates: 45°31′02″N 122°52′13″W
- Owner: TriMet
- Platforms: 1 island platform
- Tracks: 2
- Bus routes: 4
- Connections: TriMet: 52, 59, 88; CC Rider

Construction
- Parking: 595 park-and-ride spaces
- Cycle facilities: Lockers and racks
- Accessible: yes

History
- Opened: September 12, 1998 (Park-and-ride lot and bus loop opened on March 3, 1997)

Passengers
- 2006–2007: 947,000

Services
Preceding station	TriMet	Following station
Quatama toward Hatfield Government Center	Blue Line	Elmonica/SW 170th Ave toward Cleveland Ave
Quatama toward Hillsboro Airport/Fairgrounds	Red Line	Elmonica/SW 170th Ave toward Portland Airport
Location

Willow Creek/SW 185th Ave Transit Center, commonly called Willow Creek Transit Center, is a multimodal transport hub in Hillsboro, Oregon, United States, served by bus and light rail. The TriMet transit center is the ninth station eastbound on the MAX Blue Line, the fifth station eastbound on the MAX Red Line, and a hub for bus routes mostly serving Washington County in the Portland metropolitan area. It is located near the intersection of Southwest Baseline Road and 185th Avenue.

Opened in 1998, the station was originally conceived as the western terminus of the Westside MAX, but the line was extended further west into Hillsboro due to population growth occurring at the time the line was being planned. Artwork at the stop represents a reading motif, as a library was planned for the station, but never built. Willow Creek is near the Oregon National Primate Research Center and the rest of the Oregon Health & Science University's West Campus in the Tanasbourne neighborhood.

== History ==
Planning for a light rail system on Portland's west side started in 1979, with a groundbreaking coming in 1993 on the Westside MAX project. The line originally was to terminate at Willow Creek/185th, but lobbying by Hillsboro mayor Shirley Huffman and others secured funding to extend the line to downtown. Even so, at the time that Westside MAX construction started, this station was planned to the line's outer terminus initially, opening in September 1997, with the 6-mile (10 km) section between 185th Avenue and Hillsboro opening later. However, construction of the 12-mile (19 km) Downtown Portland-to-185th Avenue section fell behind schedule, due to delays in constructing the Robertson Tunnel through the West Hills, and in 1995 TriMet postponed the opening by one year, to September 1998. Under the new schedule, Willow Creek Transit Center would no longer be the line's terminus, because the delay enabled the Hillsboro extension to "catch up" with the original segment and open at the same time.

Plans for the station originally called for the construction of a branch of the Hillsboro Public Library at the stop. Due to cost overruns when building the Robertson Tunnel, the library was canceled and a Books by Rail program was added to the Hillsboro Central station. TriMet also canceled plans for security cameras at the station. The park-and-ride lot opened on March 3, 1997, served by two bus lines (61 and 88), because it was ready for use. Having been built under the original project timeline that called for the station to open September 1997, Willow Creek park-and-ride ended up being completed far in advance of the start of MAX service and related bus-service expansion, after the latter were delayed to 1998.

On September 12, 1998, Willow Creek Transit Center opened along with the rest of the Westside MAX line. The park-and-ride lot was filled to 67% capacity on average within a few months of the MAX line's opening. In 1999, library officials proposed moving the Books by Rail program to the busier Willow Creek station, but the move did not occur and the program was later canceled due to reduced library funds and a failed library funding levy. By December 1999, Willow Creek was the second-busiest station in terms of boardings on the Hillsboro portion, averaging 2,313 per day. The park-and-ride lot was the fifth busiest on the MAX system by March 2000.

A woman at Willow Creek was hit by MAX train in November 2000. A nearly 400-unit apartment complex was built adjacent to the station in 2003. In 2005, a stabbing occurred at the stop, and in 2007 a rider forced off the MAX by TriMet then attempted to assault someone at the neighboring apartment complex.

Of the 16 MAX stations on the west side, Willow Creek had the third-highest number of boardings for the 2006–2007 fiscal year, with an estimated 947,000, and the most calls for police assistance with 971. In 2008, TriMet secured a grant from the Transportation Security Administration to allow the transit agency to add security cameras to the station. Portland Community College (PCC) began construction of a training center at the station in 2008, with the $25 million facility then opened in 2009. TriMet had planned to build a third track in 2009 at the station in order to allow the extension of the Red Line to Willow Creek using federal stimulus funds, but canceled the project due to projected costs.

== Facilities ==
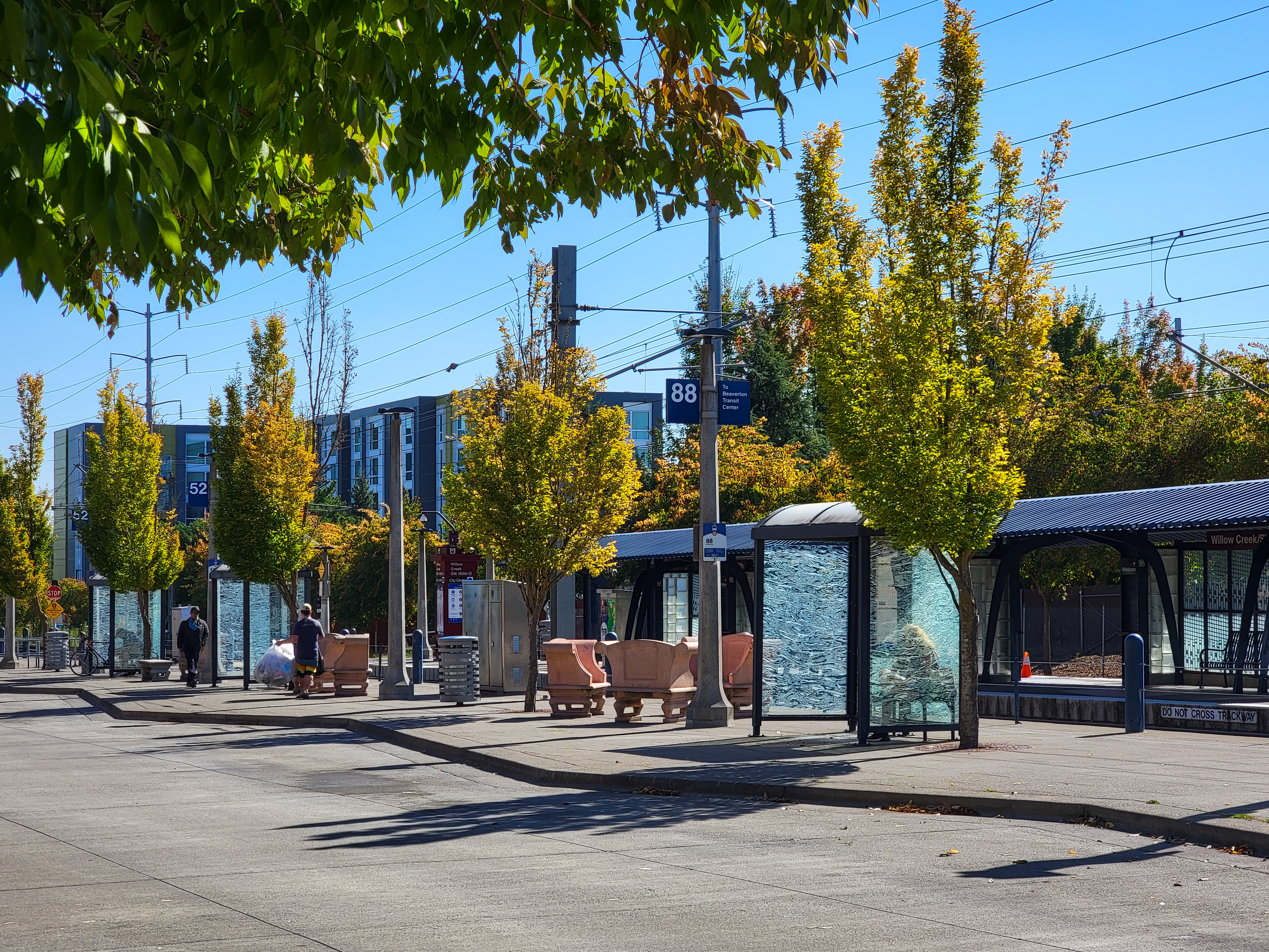
Bus area with platform in the background

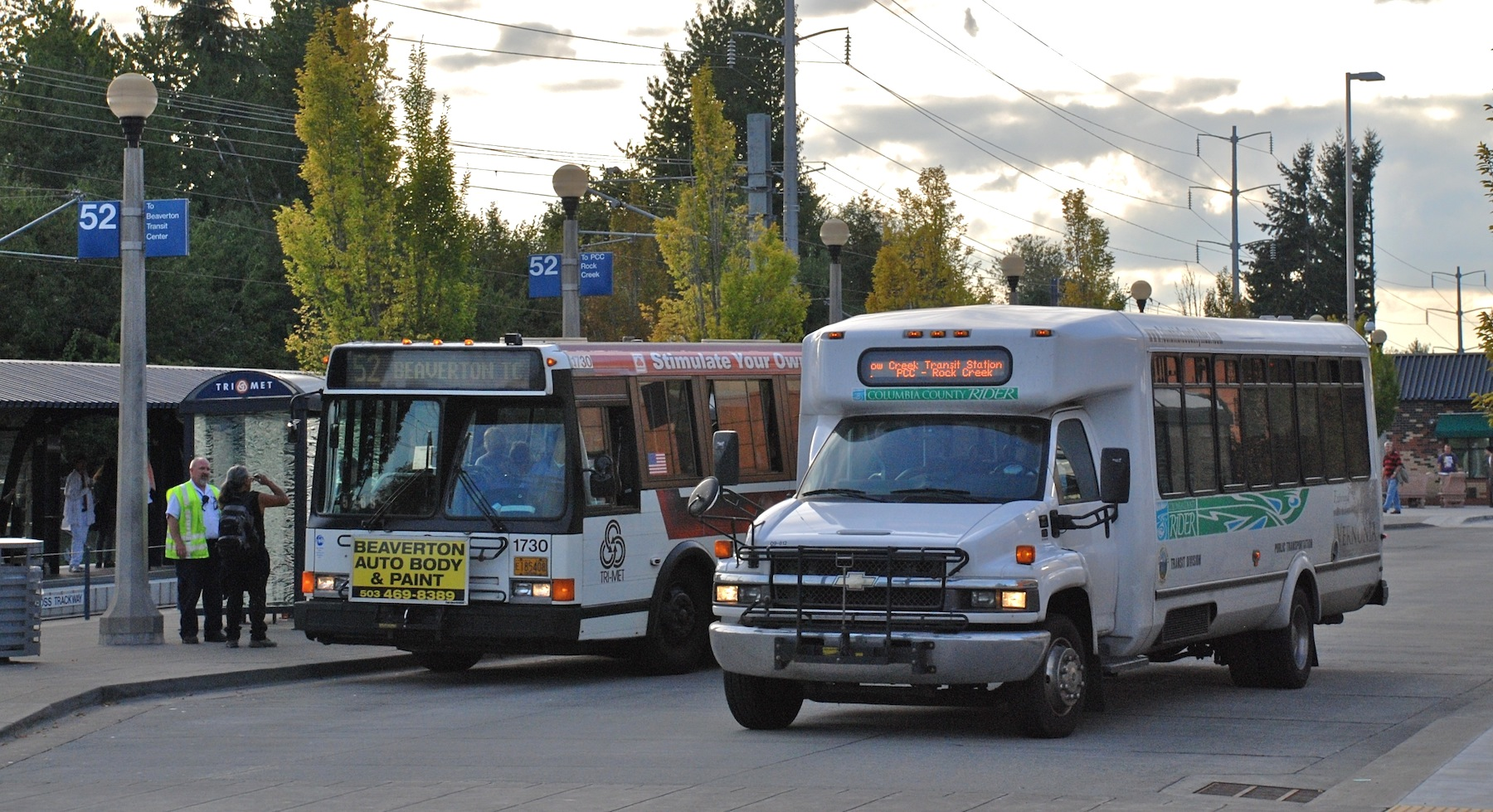
TriMet bus being passed by a CC Rider midibus at the station

Willow Creek Transit Center is located just northwest of the intersection of Baseline Road and Southwest 185th Avenue. The station includes a park-and-ride lot along with racks and lockers for bicycles. With 595 parking spaces, the parking lot is the second biggest park-and-ride on the MAX line after the Sunset Transit Center. As with all MAX stations, it is Americans with Disabilities Act (accessible) compliant and has ticket vending machines on the island-type platform. Willow Creek also has a concessions stand next to the bus plaza. The station serves the east Hillsboro and west Beaverton areas, and is located about 1 mile (1.6 km) north of Aloha. This includes Oregon Health & Science University's West Campus in the Tanasbourne neighborhood of Hillsboro, including the Oregon National Primate Research Center.

The transit center is served by TriMet bus lines 52, 59 and 88. Midibuses of Columbia County's CC Rider transit service also stop there on weekdays, providing direct service to Scappoose and St. Helens. Landscaping at the station included trees that bloom (cherry), which TriMet traditionally shuns in favor of non-blooming tree species due to higher maintenance costs of the blooming trees. These were replaced by non-blooming trees during construction of the PCC building in 2008. The station was designed by architectural firm OTAK of Lake Oswego.

=== Public art ===
Artwork at the transit center includes large, stone, Victorian themed chairs and tables that have literary names etched into them. These represent reading rooms that were to complement the originally planned library. The reading theme continues with embedded-tile word puzzles in the floor of the platform. These puzzles include names of authors and characters.

There are also various letters from different alphabets from around the globe in the concrete. Additionally, brick TriMet buildings at the station include an abstract pattern designed to mimic the falling cherry blossoms from the nearby trees. A work by artist Christopher Rauschenberg memorializes the landscape of the site prior to the construction of MAX, etching the work into the windows of the platform's wind break.

== See also ==
- List of TriMet transit centers
