= Sunset Transit Center =

Light rail station in Portland, Oregon, U.S.

Sunset TC
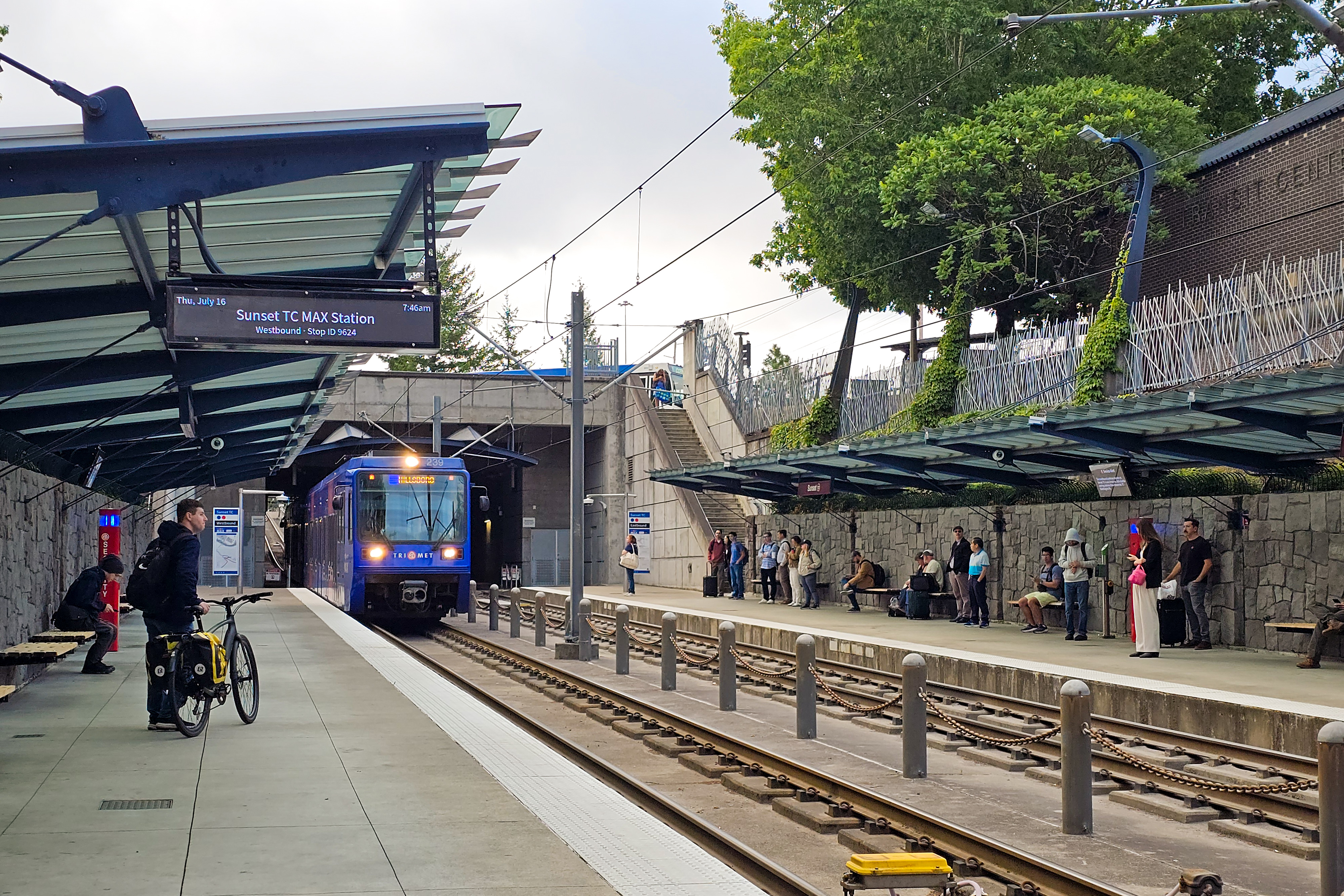
- A MAX train arriving at the transit center, 2026

General information
- Location: 10470 SW Barnes Rd; Portland, Oregon, U.S.
- Coordinates: 45°30′37″N 122°46′52″W
- Owner: TriMet
- Platforms: 2 side platforms
- Tracks: 2

Construction
- Parking: 630 spaces
- Cycle facilities: 74-space secure area
- Accessible: Yes

History
- Opened: September 12, 1998; Parking garage and one bus line: March 3, 1997

Passengers
- Fall 2025: 3,015 (average weekday)
- Rank: 8 of 94

Services
Preceding station	TriMet	Following station
Beaverton Transit Center toward Hatfield Government Center	Blue Line	Washington Park toward Cleveland Ave
Beaverton Transit Center toward Hillsboro Airport/Fairgrounds	Red Line	Washington Park toward Portland Airport
Location

Sunset Transit Center is a TriMet bus transit center and light rail station on the MAX Blue and Red lines in Beaverton, Oregon. It opened for MAX in 1998 and is the 5th stop westbound on the Westside MAX. This is the first stop after the Robertson Tunnel under Portland's West Hills. Sunset TC is the second-busiest station on the Westside MAX line, with a weekday average of almost 6,000 daily riders in 2012. Though the station has a Portland address, it primarily serves residents of the communities of Cedar Hills, Cedar Mill, and Beaverton.

Named for the adjacent Sunset Highway (part of U.S. 26), the transit center also has a pedestrian bridge over that freeway, to connect to the Cedar Hills Shopping Center and Cedar Hills neighborhood. Several bus routes serve the center.

The transit center's MAX platforms are below street level, set in an open cut, immediately west of an unnamed 600-foot-long tunnel to the shoulder of Oregon Route 217. Multiple bus stops are located around the top of the station pit, and at the station's west end is a two-story park-and-ride garage with 622 parking spaces on three levels (the top level is open). The garage includes a 74-space secured parking area for bicycles, opened in 2010. The park-and-ride is the busiest park-and-ride in TriMet's system.

== History ==
Under land development terms set by Washington County, J. Peterkort Co., which had owned the site of Sunset Transit Center, was required to include a transit center in the development of its 252-acre (102 ha) property north of the U.S. Route 26 (US 26) and Oregon Route 217 (OR 217) junction. On December 31, 1986, Peterkort sold 3.4 acres (1.4 ha) of the land to TriMet for $962,000.

The parking garage opened on March 3, 1997, served by a single bus line (89) whose route was altered for the purpose, because its construction was completed well ahead of the opening of the Westside MAX line. Route 89 provided service between downtown Portland and Rock Creek at that time.

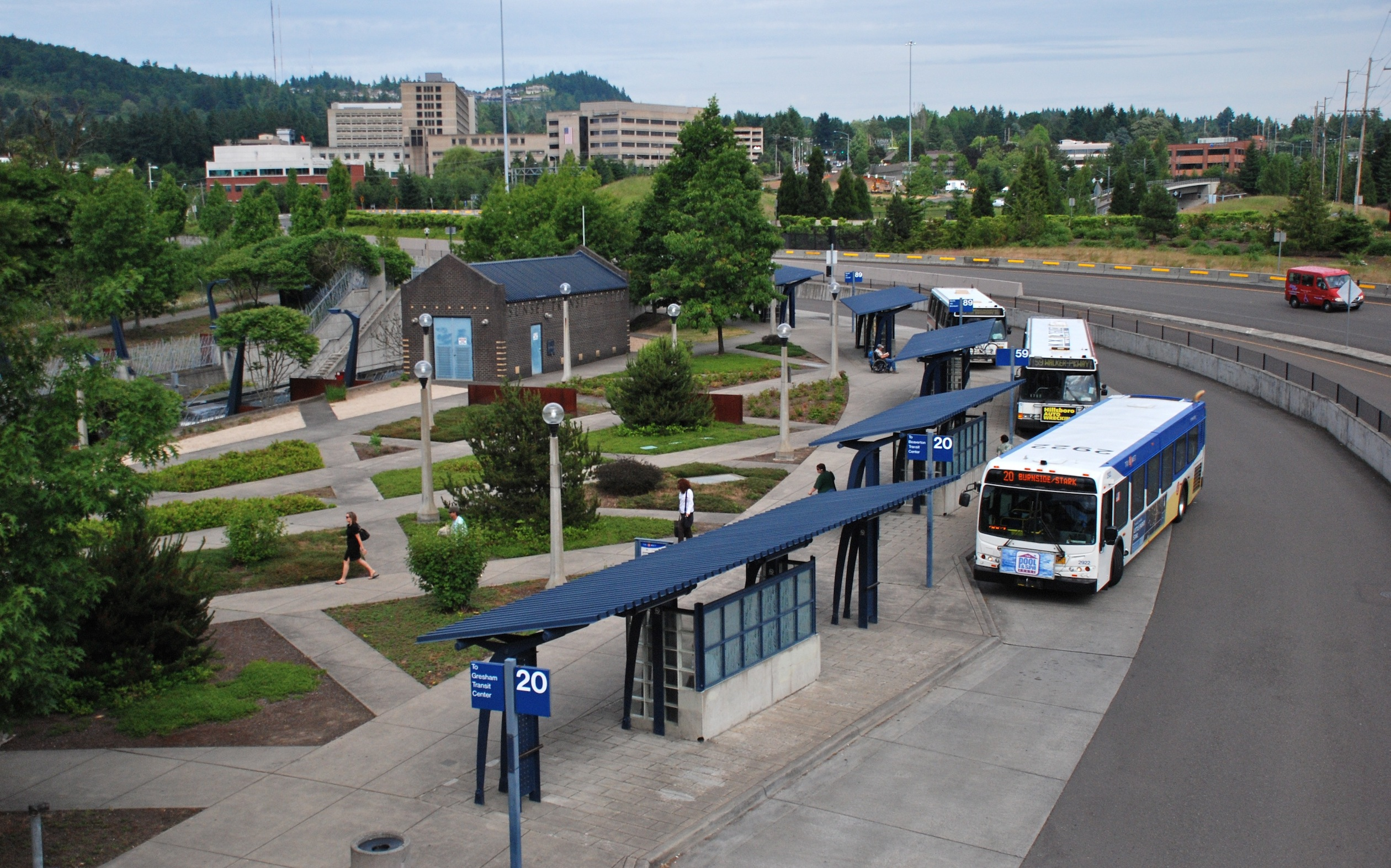
The transit center's bus bays in 2011

The transit center effectively opened on September 12, 1998, with the start of MAX service and the addition of several more bus routes, the latter altered to serve Sunset TC in place of the 1979-opened Cedar Hills Transit Center, located on the other side of the freeway (and closed permanently on this date).

Sunset TC is the second-busiest MAX station on Portland's west side, with a weekday average of almost 6,000 daily riders in 2012.

In 2010, TriMet converted eight automobile parking spaces to a secure bicycle parking area, opening in July of that year. The bicycle parking cage was built at a cost of $275,000, using federal economic-stimulus funding, and has a capacity of 74 bicycles. As of April 2011, its usage was averaging 1.2 bicycles per day, with an observed maximum of seven bicycles. TriMet closed the MAX station platforms on September 3, 2014 in order to replace the platforms, with trains passing through but not stopping during the closure period. The station reopened on September 17, two days ahead of schedule.

On October 24, 2016, POINT began serving the transit center with its Portland–Astoria service, four times a day (twice a day in each direction).

== Station details ==
Sunset Transit Center is located at Southwest Barnes Road near the junction of US 26 and OR 217.

== Service ==
=== Bus ===
This station by Sunset Highway (U.S. 26) is served by the following bus lines:

- 20 - Burnside/Stark
- 48 - Cornell
- 59 - Walker/Park Way
- 62 - Murray Blvd
- 76 - Hall/Greenburg
- POINT service to Astoria, on the Oregon Coast
- Tillamook County Transportation District (TCTD) service to Tillamook, on the Oregon Coast
- Forest Heights Shuttle
- Ride Connection BethanyLink

== See also ==
- List of TriMet transit centers
