= Martini glass sign =

Sign in Portland, Oregon, U.S.

- Location within Oregon
- Coordinates: 45.50606°N 122.68650°W

A large sign of a martini glass has been displayed seasonally in Portland, Oregon since the 1970s. The lighted display is located at a private residence in the Tualatin Mountains, sometimes called the Martini House.

== Description and history ==
=== 1970s–2012 ===
In 1976 or 1977, high school student Monty Meadows created the original "ramshackle" martini glass sign for his family's house on Southwest Buckingham Court in the Tualatin Mountains (also known as the Southwest Hills or West Hills). Copying a smaller version in the neighborhood, he used two-by-fours from a construction site and Christmas lights. The display was knocked over by wind. After his second, stronger sign also failed, he received assistance from his father Merritt "Bud" Meadows. The two continued to reinforce the display each year, adding additional lights and stronger aluminum piping, sometimes with help from other family members and friends. The sign was made of glass, metal and lights. In 2007, The Oregonian's Anna Griffin wrote, "Up close, the display seems surprisingly fragile: the martini glass is just a thin piece of tubing dotted with white bulbs. Four bigger bulbs—three green, one white—create the olive. The whole display stretches maybe 20 feet from top to bottom, nearly the same height as the unassuming—at least for this neighborhood—house it hangs on."

When Monty's parents divorced in 1982, the sign was moved to a friend's house. However, the dentist who purchased the family's home requested the sign be returned. Gary Cooke made the sign taller and more visible by grouping lights closer and more consistent. He also added fog lights to improve the definition of the martini's olive. Cooke also constructed a red slash, which appears across the martini glass near closing time, as requested by Mothers Against Drunk Driving.

=== 2015–present ===
Architect Aaron Hall began displaying the sign after a hiatus which began in 2012. In 2015, Betsy Hammond of The Oregonian said Hall "updated the styles and materials to today's technology and aesthetic. He not only switched it to LED, he also upgraded the glass's design, creating a deeper and wider bowl to better match the proportion of the stem. It looks sleeker and more professional than its predecessor. And it is anchored more solidly to the home's three decks, along the entire back rather than at one corner." The approximately 30 feet (9.1 m) tall, 30 feet (9.1 m) wide sign displays a martini glass with an olive.

== Reception ==
In 2007, Anna Griffin of The Oregonian wrote: "Over the years, various people have read various meanings into the oversized and ornately lit martini glass that beams down over Portland each holiday season. To some, the West Hills fixture is a familiar symbol of Christmas cheer. To others, it's an homage to Portland's anti-establishment ethos. To a few, it's unfortunate encouragement to party too hard this time of year."

The Meadows family is proud of their work, but Monty's brother Marshall said the red slash "ruined" the sign. He said, "Nothing about those lights encouraged drunk driving. Some people take everything too seriously." Monty, who was sober for over a decade as of 2007, has said he appreciates the red slash.

In 2017, Atlas Obscura's Cara Giaimo called the sign a "beloved landmark" and wrote, "The giant libation had been a fixture of the holiday landscape for decades, but went dark in 2012 after the property was sold to an architect, who tore it down along with the rest of the house. Portlanders have mourned the skyline's sobriety ever since, and the sign's return last week was heartily toasted."
