= Washington Park station (TriMet) =

Light rail station in Portland, Oregon, US

Washington Park
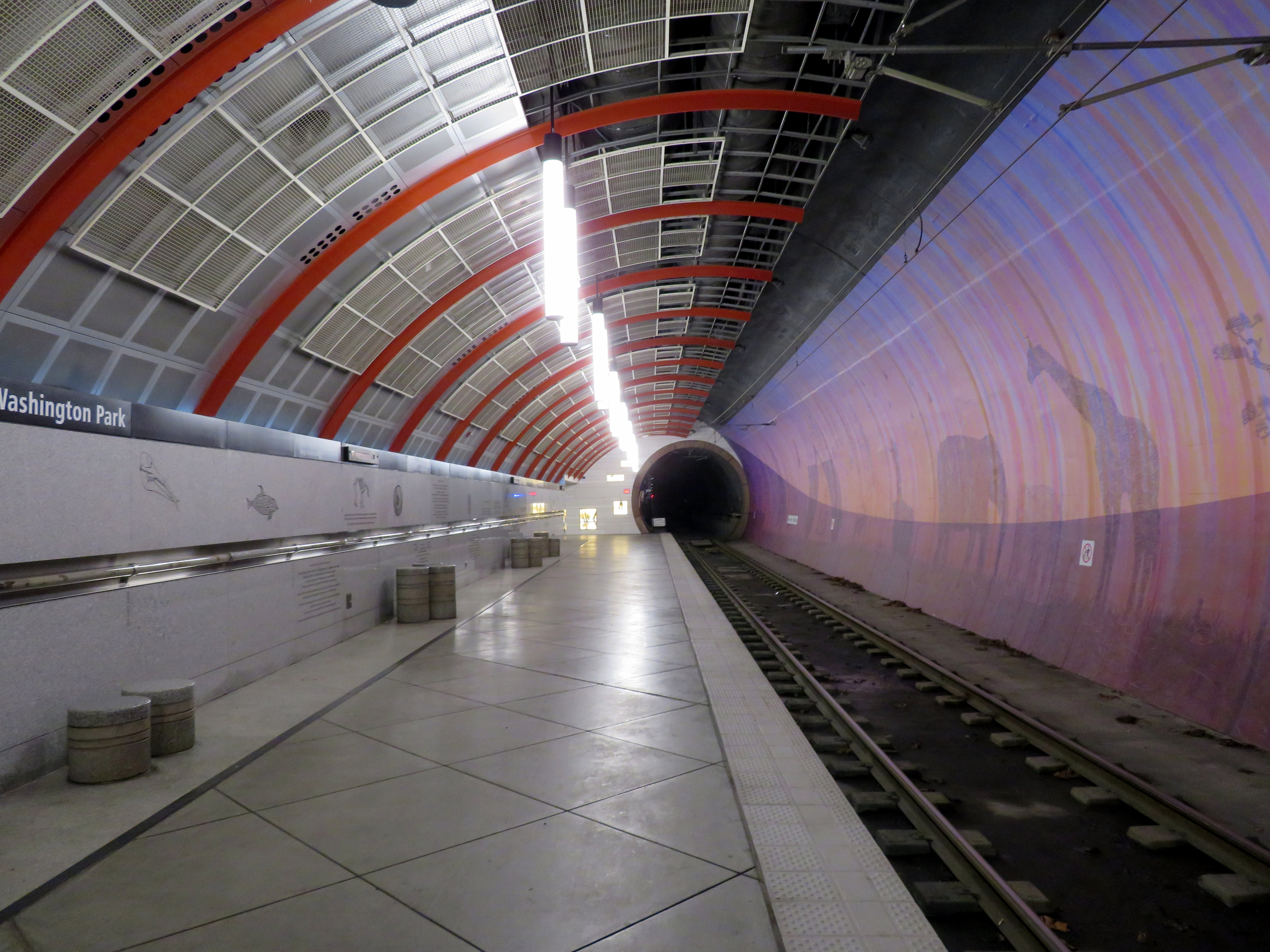
- Westbound platform in 2018, facing west

General information
- Location: Washington Park near the Oregon Zoo entrance on SW Zoo Road; Portland, Oregon, U.S.
- Coordinates: 45°30′38″N 122°43′01″W
- Owner: TriMet
- Platforms: 1 island platform
- Tracks: 2

Construction
- Structure type: Underground
- Depth: 260 ft (79.25 m)
- Platform levels: 1
- Accessible: yes

History
- Opened: September 12, 1998

Services
Preceding station	TriMet	Following station
Sunset Transit Center toward Hatfield Government Center	Blue Line	Goose Hollow/SW Jefferson St toward Cleveland Ave
Sunset Transit Center toward Hillsboro Airport/Fairgrounds	Red Line	Goose Hollow/SW Jefferson St toward Portland Airport
Location

Washington Park is a light rail station in Portland, Oregon, United States, served by TriMet as part of MAX Light Rail. Situated between Sunset Transit Center and Goose Hollow/SW Jefferson St station, it is the 17th and 13th station eastbound on the Blue Line and the Red Line, respectively. The island platform station occupies a section of the Robertson Tunnel beneath Portland's West Hills. It is the only completely underground MAX station and at 260 feet (79 m) below ground, it is the deepest transit station in North America.

Washington Park station opened in September 1998 as part of the Westside MAX extension to Beaverton and Hillsboro. It serves its namesake park with head houses located in a plaza surrounded by the Hoyt Arboretum, Oregon Vietnam Veterans Memorial, Oregon Zoo, and World Forestry Center. Various hiking trails, some a part of Portland's 40-Mile Loop, connect the station to other parts of Washington Park, including the International Rose Test Garden and the Portland Japanese Garden.

== History ==
Plans to build a light rail line to serve Portland's western suburbs in Washington County emerged in 1979 with a proposal from regional government Metro to extend what would become the Metropolitan Area Express (MAX) from its inaugural terminus in downtown Portland farther west to the cities of Beaverton and Hillsboro. During early planning, several alternative alignments through the West Hills were determined, including routes along the Sunset Highway, Beaverton–Hillsdale Highway, and Multnomah Boulevard. A majority of jurisdictions had selected a Sunset Highway light rail alternative by June 1982, with the Portland City Council the last to adopt a resolution supporting this route in July 1983. Metro subsequently moved forward with this alternative, and the Urban Mass Transportation Administration (UMTA) authorized $1.3 million in funds to begin a preliminary engineering study. Soon afterwards, TriMet suspended the project to focus on the completion of the Banfield Light Rail Project.

Planning for the westside extension resumed in January 1988. Prior to the start of preliminary engineering efforts, the Portland City Council asked TriMet to consider building a rail tunnel through the West Hills instead of following the Sunset Highway alternative's proposal to run tracks on the surface alongside Canyon Road. TriMet's engineers noted that this surface option would carry a steep six- to seven-percent grade as opposed to only two percent in a tunnel. That May, TriMet awarded a $230,000 contract to surveying firm Spencer B. Gross of Portland to map out the proposed area and another $200,000 contract to a partnership between Cornforth Consultants of Tigard and tunneling firm Law/Geoconsult International International of Atlanta to determine alternative tunnel routes. After several months of soil testing, TriMet announced that a tunnel would be feasible. In October, the agency released a report that identified three tunnel options: a 3-mile (4.8 km) "long tunnel" with a station serving the Oregon Zoo, the same long tunnel without a station, and a .5-mile (0.80 km) "short tunnel". Both long tunnels featured a western portal west of Sylvan while the short tunnel featured one on Canyon Road, and all three had an eastern portal near Jefferson Street in Portland's Goose Hollow neighborhood. These proposals were immediately met with opposition from West Hills residents who feared that tunneling activity would trigger landslides.

The station was designed by the Zimmer Gunsul Frasca Partnership (ZGF) architecture firm and built by Hoffman Construction Company, with engineering by Parsons Brinckerhoff. It opened in 1998 along with the rest of the westside MAX Line. Building Design & Construction named the station as its top public works project in 1999 in its Building Team Project of the Year competition.

In 2018, TriMet completed a $2.1 million renovation of the station's platform level. The agency partnered with ZGF for the renovation, which included mounting energy-efficient LED lighting and installing patterned tiles along the platform-side and elevator lobby walls. Artists from Mayer/Reed painted large-scale murals over the 300-foot-long (91 m) walls across the tracks from the platform.

== Station details ==
=== Surface ===
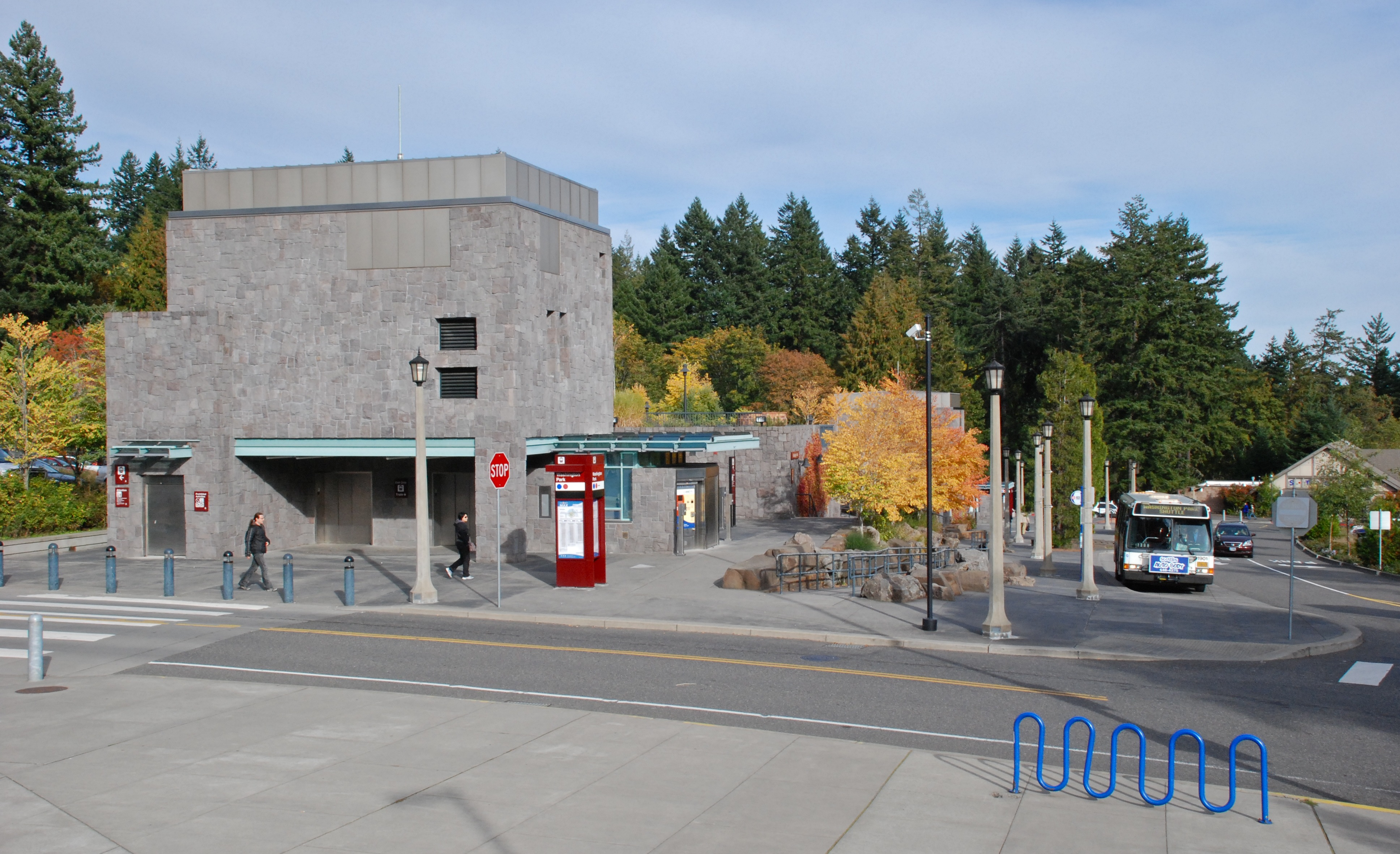
West head house and bus stop

The surface portion includes a public plaza named in honor of Les AuCoin, a former member of the U.S. House of Representatives who supported the project. The entrance to the zoo is located just across a parking-lot road from the station plaza, having been moved north from its previous location the weekend after the station opened. Two high-speed elevators are located at either end of the underground station; visitors to the Oregon Zoo are directed to the east elevators while people going to the World Forestry Center are pointed to the west.

=== Underground ===
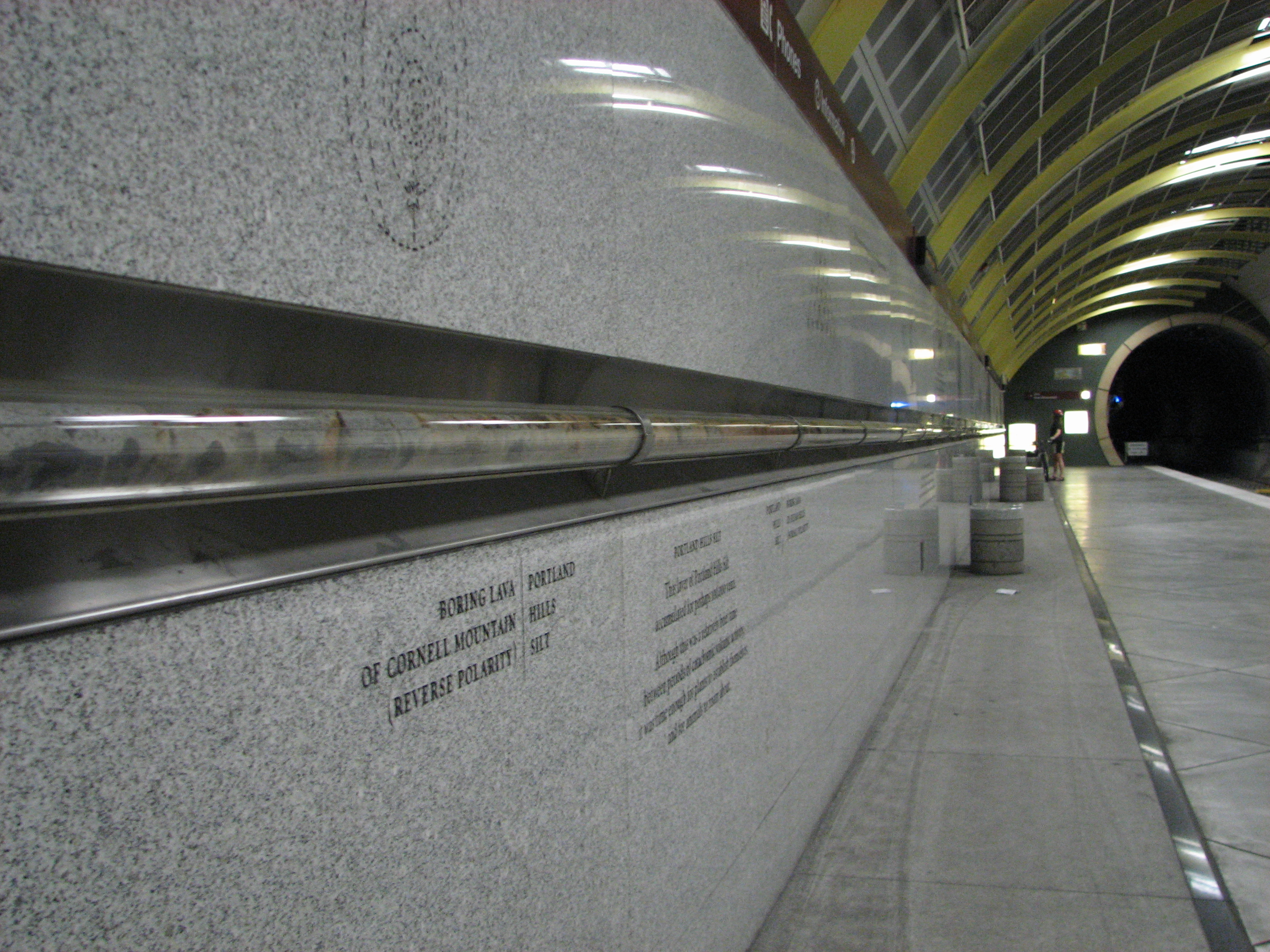
Core sample and geologic time displayed on the south (eastbound) platform

The Robertson Tunnel consists of two single-track tubes, one for each direction of travel. The 200-foot (61 m) station platform is between the rails, accessed from the left side of trains. A geological timeline—created from a drilling core sample—runs along the platform walls. The eastbound platform is marked by yellow roof girders, symbolizing the sunrise; the westbound platform has orange roof girders, symbolizing the sunset. The platforms were nicknamed Sunrise and Sunset, respectively, by TriMet.

Trains entering the tunnel more than a mile away can be heard from the platforms. They move at up to 55 mph (89 km/h) and push a stream of constant-temperature air into the station. This, coupled with the surrounding rock, keeps the platform at a natural average temperature of 50 °F (10 °C) year round.

A memorial to the only worker killed during the construction of the Robertson Tunnel is located on the wall next to the tunnel portal at the east end of the "Sunset" (westbound) platform.

=== Elevators ===
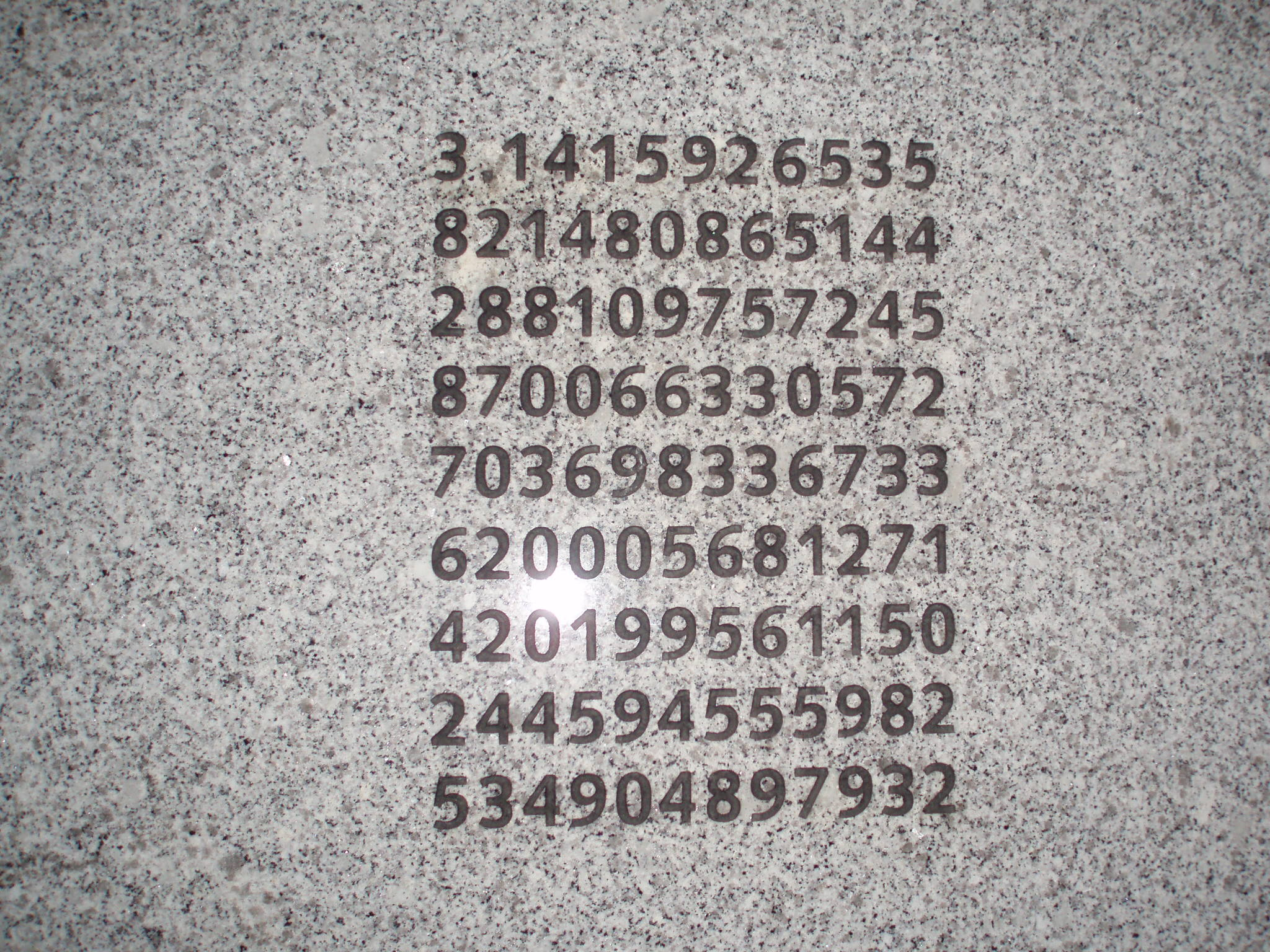
The value of pi is carved into the wall of the eastbound platform. However, only the first 11 decimal places are correct. It has been determined that the digits displayed are digits 1..10, 101..110, 201..210 etc.

The elevators stop at only two levels, surface (S) and tunnel (T) level. As a part of the station's geological theme, the floor indicators outside the elevators refer to these two levels not by conventional floor numbers but by "the present" and "16 million years ago"—for the surface level and tunnel level, respectively. During ascent and descent, a moving indicator display inside each elevator shows the current position expressed as elevation above sea level in feet. The 26-story (28 for the west elevators) equivalent ride takes about 25 seconds. Due to the hillside surface slope, the west elevators are 20 feet (6.1 m) taller than the east elevators.

== Bus line connections ==
This underground MAX station is served by one bus line, the Washington Park Free Shuttle, which now runs year-round (since May 2019), after having been seasonal in the past. Previously, TriMet line 63–Washington Park/Arlington Heights also served the station, but ceased to do so in May 2022.
