= Hawthorn Farm station =

Light rail station in Hillsboro, Oregon, U.S.

Hawthorn Farm
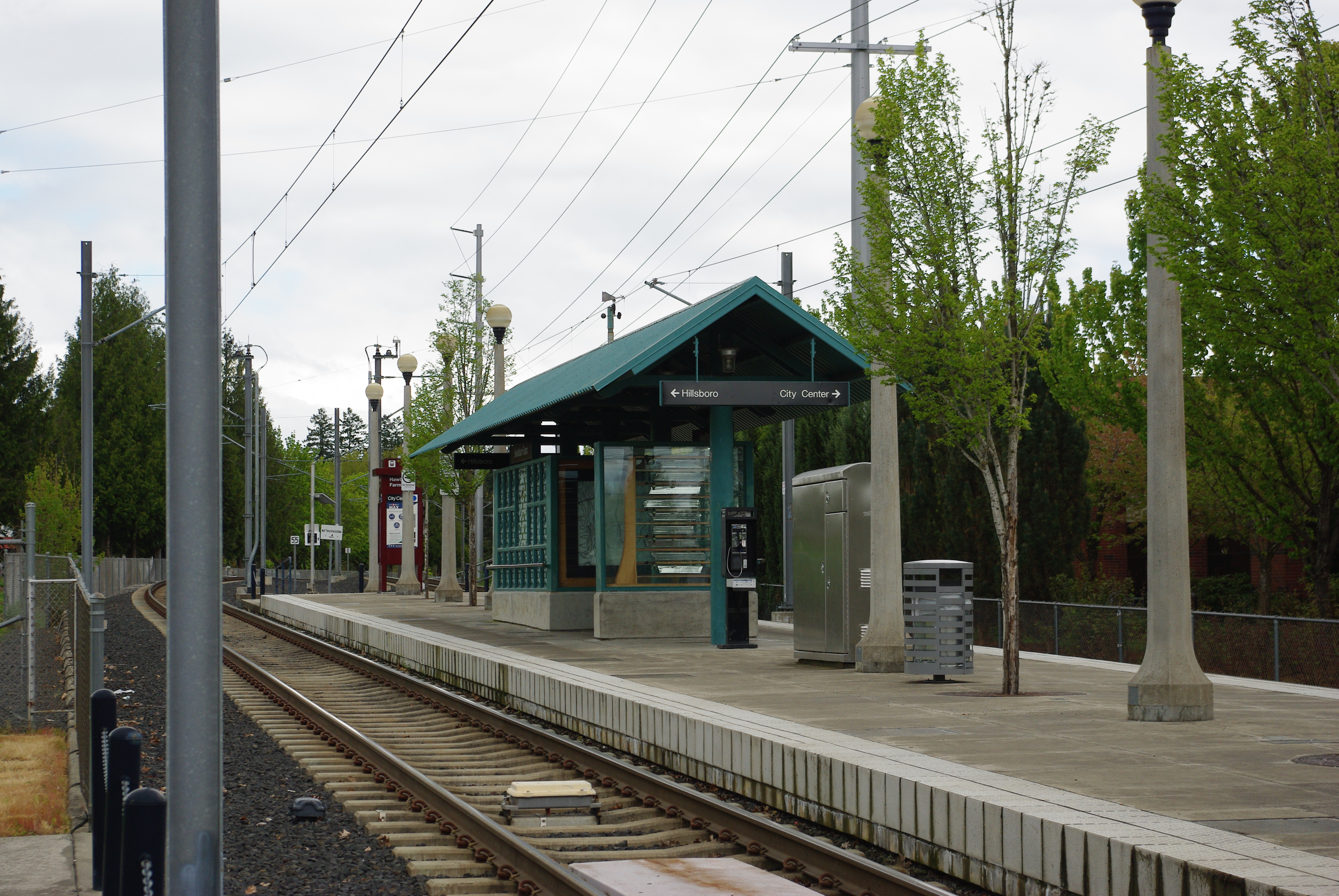

General information
- Location: NE Elam Young Parkway south of Cornell Road; Hillsboro, Oregon; USA
- Coordinates: 45°31′48″N 122°55′51″W
- Owner: TriMet
- Platforms: 1 island platform
- Tracks: 2

Construction
- Parking: None
- Accessible: yes

History
- Opened: September 12, 1998

Services
Preceding station	TriMet	Following station
Hillsboro Airport/Fairgrounds toward Hatfield Government Center	Blue Line	Orenco toward Cleveland Ave
Hillsboro Airport/Fairgrounds Terminus	Red Line	Orenco toward Portland Airport
Location

Hawthorn Farm is a light rail station on the MAX Blue and Red lines in Hillsboro, Oregon, United States. Opened in 1998, it is the 15th stop westbound on the Westside MAX. The TriMet owned station does not have a parking lot nor bus connections. Artwork at the station utilizes electronics to provide waiting passengers with indicators of approaching trains, the wind's direction, and sounds from a neighboring wetlands area. The name of the station comes from the name of the family who once owned a farm and a historic home on the land, and is shared with a business park and an Intel campus.

== History ==
Planning for the light rail system on Portland's west side began in 1979, with groundbreaking coming in 1993 on the Westside MAX project. During planning, the stop was part of the planning area that included the Fair Complex/Hillsboro Airport station. On September 12, 1998, Hawthorn Farm station opened along with the rest of the Westside MAX line.

In March 2000, an escaped rapist was chased from the station and caught by citizens nearby. Bus Line 41s connected to the station until canceled in 2002 due to low use. In July 2006, a rider was chased off the train at the station and beaten by two teenagers. Hawthorn Farm had an estimated 110,000 boardings for the 2006 to 2007 fiscal year, and 34 calls for police assistance. In March 2011, TriMet received a federal grant to pay for the installation of security cameras at the station.

== Amenities ==
Located on Elam Young Parkway, the station is on the Blue and Red Lines. It was in TriMet’s Zone 3 fare area before TriMet eliminated fare zoning system in 2012. The station is directly south of Intel’s Hawthorn Farm Campus south of Cornell Road in the middle of Hillsboro. Hawthorn Farm Station does not have a park and ride lot nor does it have any bus connections. The station does have bicycle lockers and racks, and is compliant with ADA standards for accessibility. Designed by architectural firm OTAK, the station has an island style platform located between the two sets of rails.

=== Artwork ===
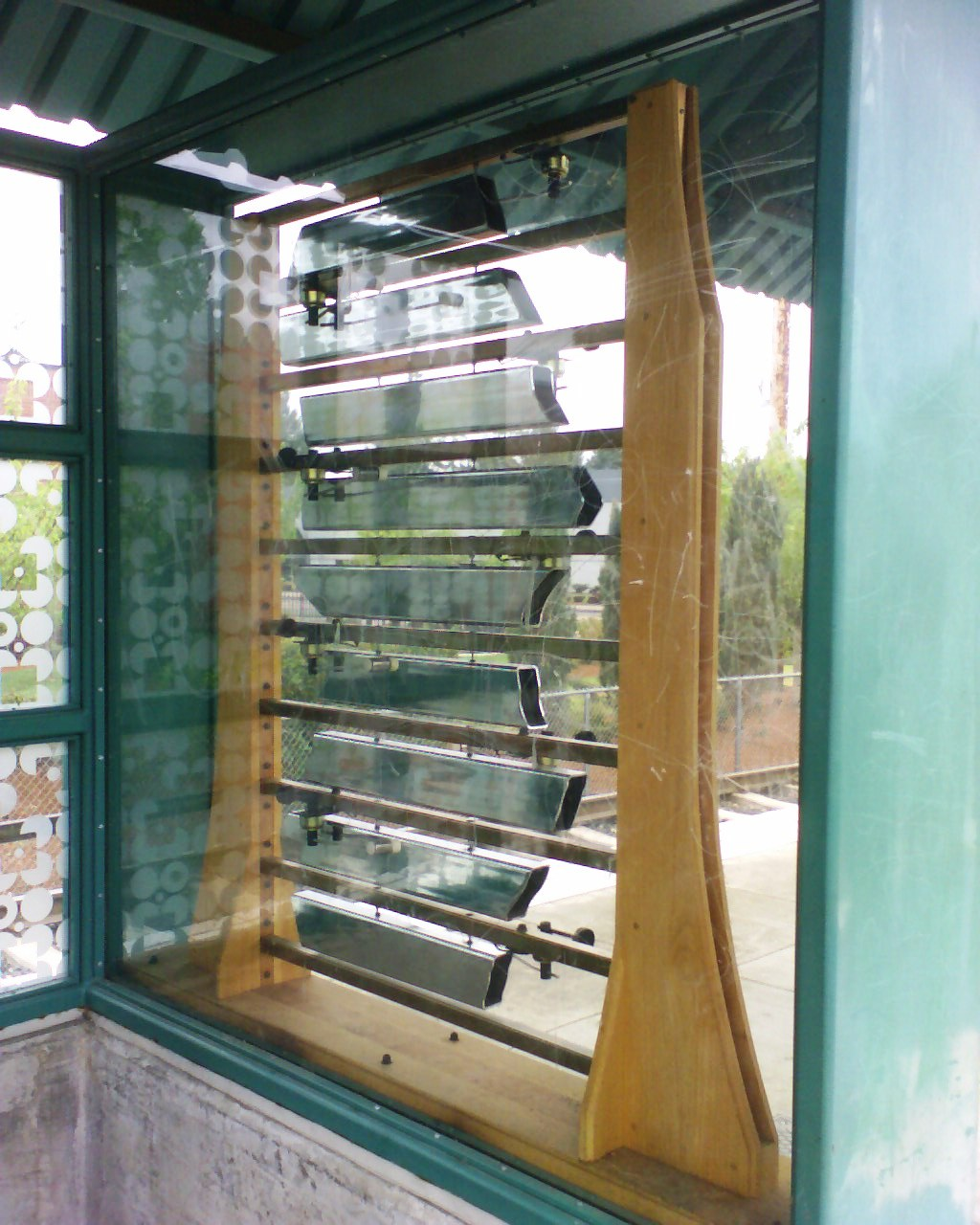
Subsystem I windchime

Art at the station was designed by Patrick Zentz and includes a weathervane with technical assistance provided by Intel employees. The weathervane sets off a system that has sounds and lights on the platform and informs waiting passengers of the wind’s direction. This system is also activated when trains approach the station. Additionally, sounds from the adjacent wetlands are piped to the station. The glass of the windbreak on the platform includes a diagram concerning the artwork at the station The three pieces of work are known as Subsystem I, II, and III, and are considered the most technically advanced pieces of art on the MAX line. Subsystem I has tone bars made of chrome that sound as trains approach, and Subsystem II uses lights and sound to indicate the wind direction. The third piece plays the sounds of the wetlands.
