= Quatama station =

Light rail station in Hillsboro, Oregon, United States

Quatama
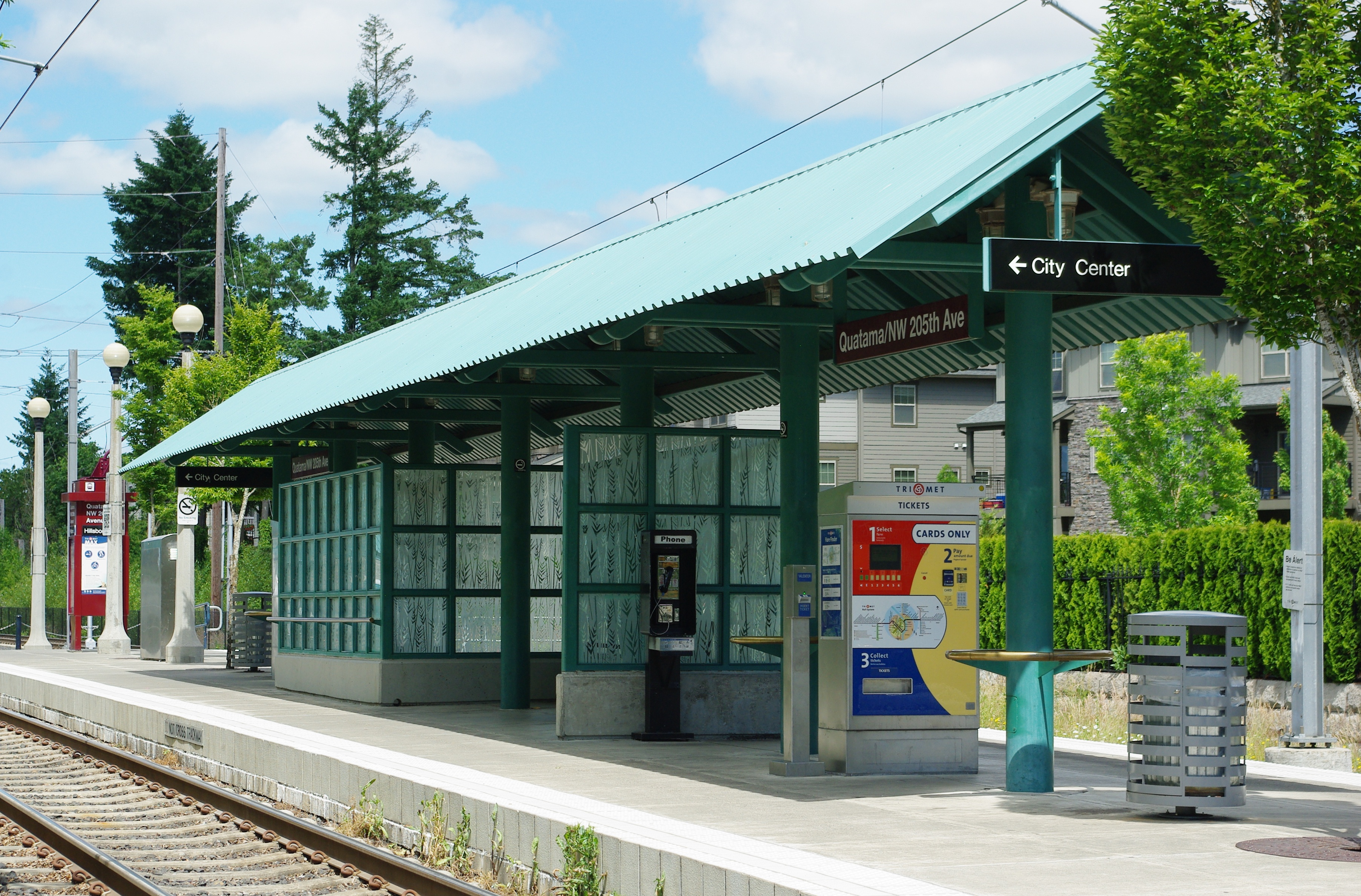

General information
- Coordinates: 45°31′23″N 122°53′19″W
- Owner: TriMet
- Platforms: 1 island platform
- Tracks: 2

Construction
- Parking: 310 park and ride spaces
- Cycle facilities: Lockers and racks
- Accessible: yes

History
- Opened: September 12, 1998
- Former names: Quatama/Northwest 205th Avenue (1998–2017)

Services
Preceding station	TriMet	Following station
Orenco toward Hatfield Government Center	Blue Line	Willow Creek/Southwest 185th Avenue Transit Center toward Cleveland Ave
Orenco toward Hillsboro Airport/Fairgrounds	Red Line	Willow Creek/Southwest 185th Avenue Transit Center toward Portland Airport
Location

Quatama station, formerly Quatama/NW 205th Ave station, is a light rail station in Hillsboro, Oregon, United States, served by TriMet as part of MAX Light Rail. Situated between Orenco station and Willow Creek Transit Center, it is the eighth station eastbound on the Blue Line and the fourth station eastbound on the Red Line. The two-track, island platform station includes a park-and-ride lot.

Quatama Station is named after the area which includes Quatama Street to the south of the station. Opened in 1998, the stop is near high-tech industries and the Amberglen business park, which includes Oregon Health & Science University's West Campus and the Oregon National Primate Research Center. With the renaming of Northwest 205th Avenue to Northeast John Olsen Avenue by the city of Hillsboro in 2017, TriMet changed the station's name from its original, longer name.

== History ==
During the planning stages of a westside light rail line, Hillsboro rezoned much of the area around the station to increase building densities. Initial planning began in 1979, with groundbreaking on the Westside MAX project coming in 1993. On September 12, 1998, the Quatama station opened along with the Westside MAX line. The area around the station was named Quatama after the former station on the Oregon Electric Railway. That train stop was near the current one and was on property owned by the Oregon Nursery Company and settled in part by Hungarians.

In 1998, and again in 2004, the weather vane at the station was vandalized. Within several months of opening, the park-and-ride lot was at 92% capacity and by July 1999, the lot was filled during the peak travel times on the MAX line. A fight injured a 17-year-old at the station in October 2000. Hillsboro planned to improve street connections to the station as part of the planned redevelopment in the south Tanasbourne area announced in 2006.

The station's platform was vandalized in a graffiti spree in June 2007 along with several surrounding developments. In October of that year, a 12-year-old was attacked with a hammer at the station. In 2008, TriMet secured a grant from the Transportation Security Administration to allow the transit agency to add security cameras to the station.

In September 2017, the station was renamed from Quatama/Northwest 205th Avenue station to Quatama station, in connection with street-name changes approved by the Hillsboro city council in October 2016. The changes included the renaming of NW 205th Avenue within Hillsboro as NE John Olsen Avenue, scheduled for October 2017.

== Details ==
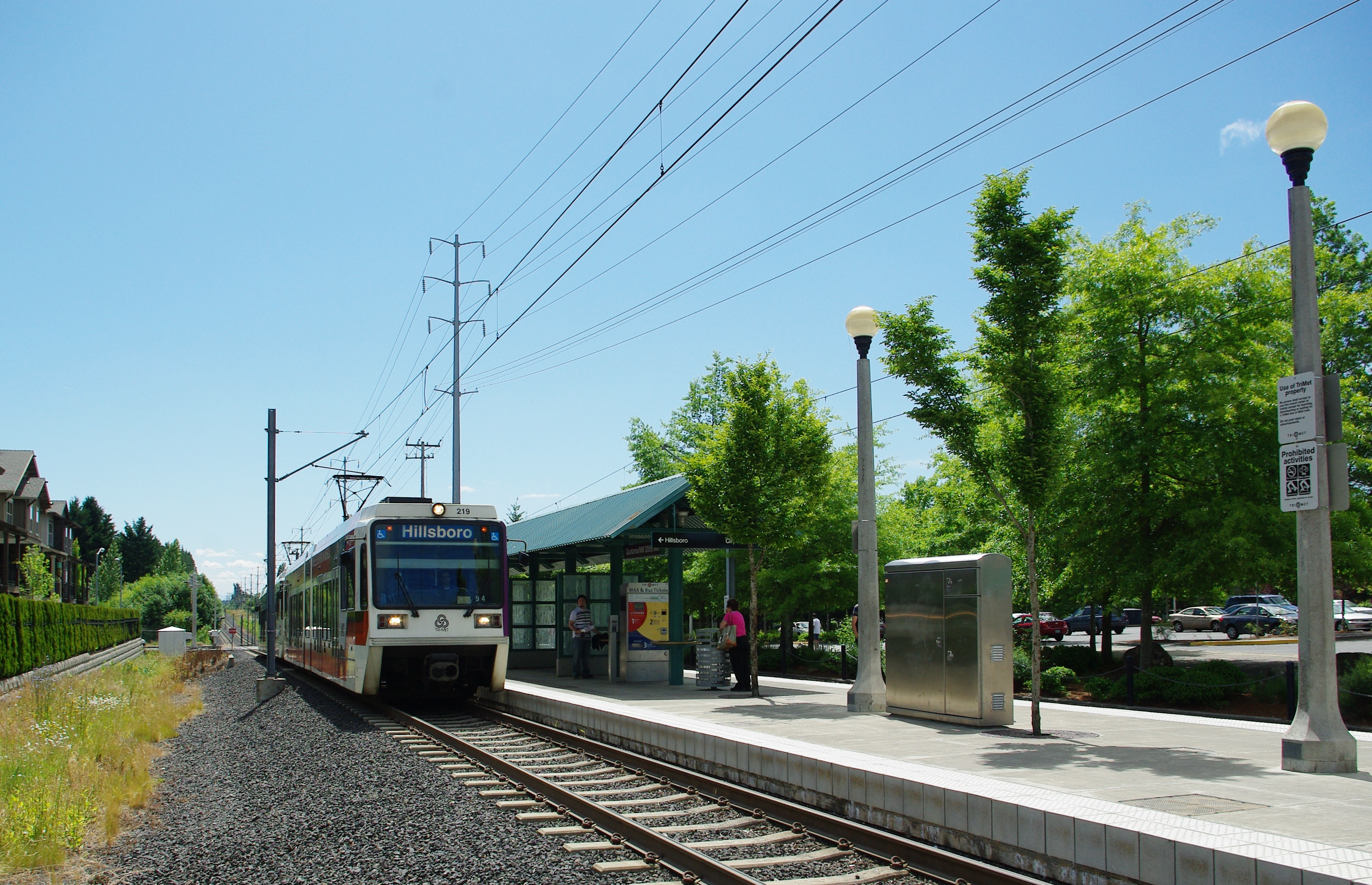
A westbound train at the station

Designed by the architectural group OTAK Inc., the station features a single island platform between the two tracks. Located on northwest Quatama Road at northwest 205th Avenue in Hillsboro, the station is served by the MAX Blue Line. The station includes a park-and-ride lot, bike lockers, bike racks, has a variety of public artwork, and is compliant with the Americans with Disabilities Act. It was situated in fare zone 3 until TriMet discontinued all use of fare zones, in September 2012. The station sits on 3.35 acres (13,600 m^{2}) on the south side of the rail line. The construction of townhomes and condominiums in the area was a result of the station.

=== Public art ===
Artwork at the station has a theme of understanding nature. One piece of art reflecting that theme at the stop is a weather vane designed by Michael Oppenheimer. The weather vane is titled “Cattail Tunes” and is based on the plant that grows in nearby wetlands. Constructed of stainless steel rods, the piece is composed of five rods standing 24 feet (7.3 m) tall and six feet apart. The rods are topped with metal cattail heads, each a different height so that they sway differently from each other.

Continuing with the natural elements theme, the platform has animal tracks etched into the concrete while the windscreen in the passenger shelter includes a map of the watershed for the Tualatin River etched into the glass. Across from the platform is a plaza entitled “Flow” which features a simulated creek in the concrete. Along the creek are boulders that have scientific images engraved into them, along with a water basin that illustrates how water run-off occurs. The inspiration for this artwork comes from an arrangement made by a Japanese macaque at the Oregon National Primate Research Center across the street from the station. Designers for the artwork at Quatama Station were Jerry Mayer, Valerie Otani, Bill Will, and Fernanda D'Agostino.

== Former bus service ==
Quatama station was served by one TriMet bus line, 49s-Quatama, from September 1999 to February 2004. Line 49s ("s" for shuttle) connected the station with areas to the north, including the former Oregon Graduate Institute. Low ridership was the reason for its elimination in 2004.
