= Columbia County Rider =

Transit service in Columbia County, Oregon, US

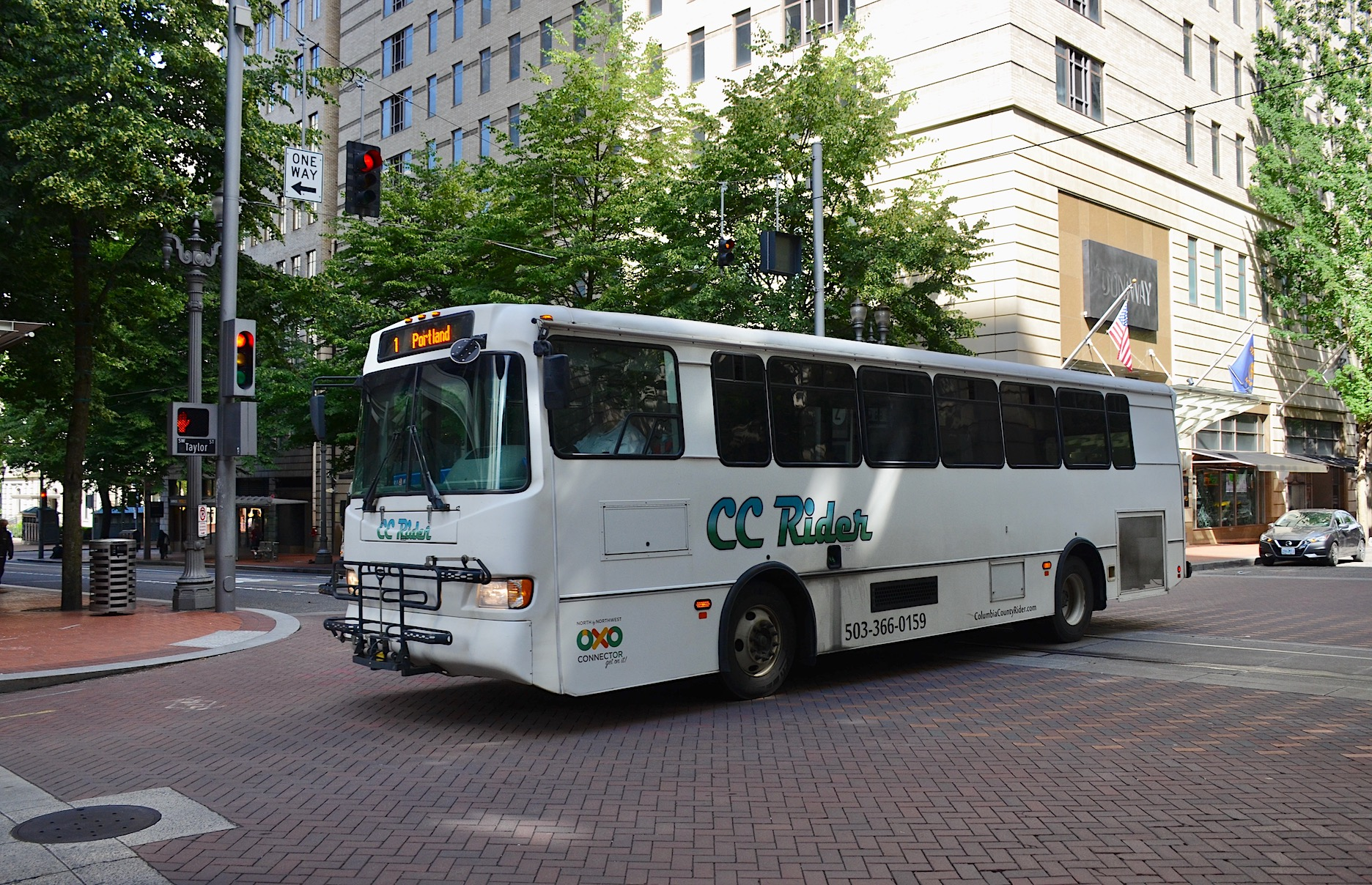
A CC Rider bus in downtown Portland in 2021, departing for St. Helens

Columbia County Rider (CC Rider) is a transit service in Columbia County, Oregon, that is managed by the Columbia County Transit Division. It is a part of NW Connector, an alliance of small bus networks in Northwest Oregon. As Of July 2025, CC Rider comprises Two bus routes. Line 1 connecting St. Helens and Scappoose to Portland. And a new bus route connecting St. Helens to Rainier connecting with RiverCities Transit for service to Longview WA.

As of 2016, buses were operated by contract drivers supplied by MTR Western, a charter motor coach operator, but the county chose not to renew its contract with MTR when it expired in June 2022, and since July 1, 2022, the county has operated the service directly.

== Funding ==
The transit service is largely funded by grants from the Oregon Department of Transportation and the federal government. Attempts at making CC Rider a separate transit district and to introduce new taxes to fund it have repeatedly failed since 2015. Columbia County and nearby Clatsop County are currently studying options on consolidating the two county's transit services.

Single-ride fares range from $2 to $6 per ride, depending on number of zones traveled. A ride to Astoria using sister network Sunset Empire Transportation District costs up to $10 per ride each way.

Former lines 4 and 7 provided connections to Clatskanie and Astoria respectively and were cut from the network due to lack of funds. These connections can still be accessed using Sunset Empire's Lower Columbia Connector line.

== COVID-19 impact ==
In April 2020, CC Rider announced on Facebook that they would be suspending line 2 indefinitely as PCC campuses would be closing. They stated that most of the riders of that line were commuters to this college.

In June 2021, the Oregon House of Representatives proposed an infrastructure bill due to losses seen during the pandemic and wildfires, of which included additional funding to the service.

On June 16, 2021, the County Board of Commissioners decided to suspend lines 3, 5, and 6, and reduced the number of runs of line 1 starting in July 2021 due to the loss of ridership and financial resources.

=== Suspended lines ===
- Line 2, connects Willow Creek transit center and PCC Rock Creek campus to Scappoose and St. Helens
- Line 3, flex route in St. Helens
- Line 5, connects Longview and Rainier to St. Helens
- Line 6, connects Willow Creek transit center to Banks and Vernonia
