= Harold Wass Ray House =

Historic house in Oregon, United States

- U.S. National Register of Historic Places
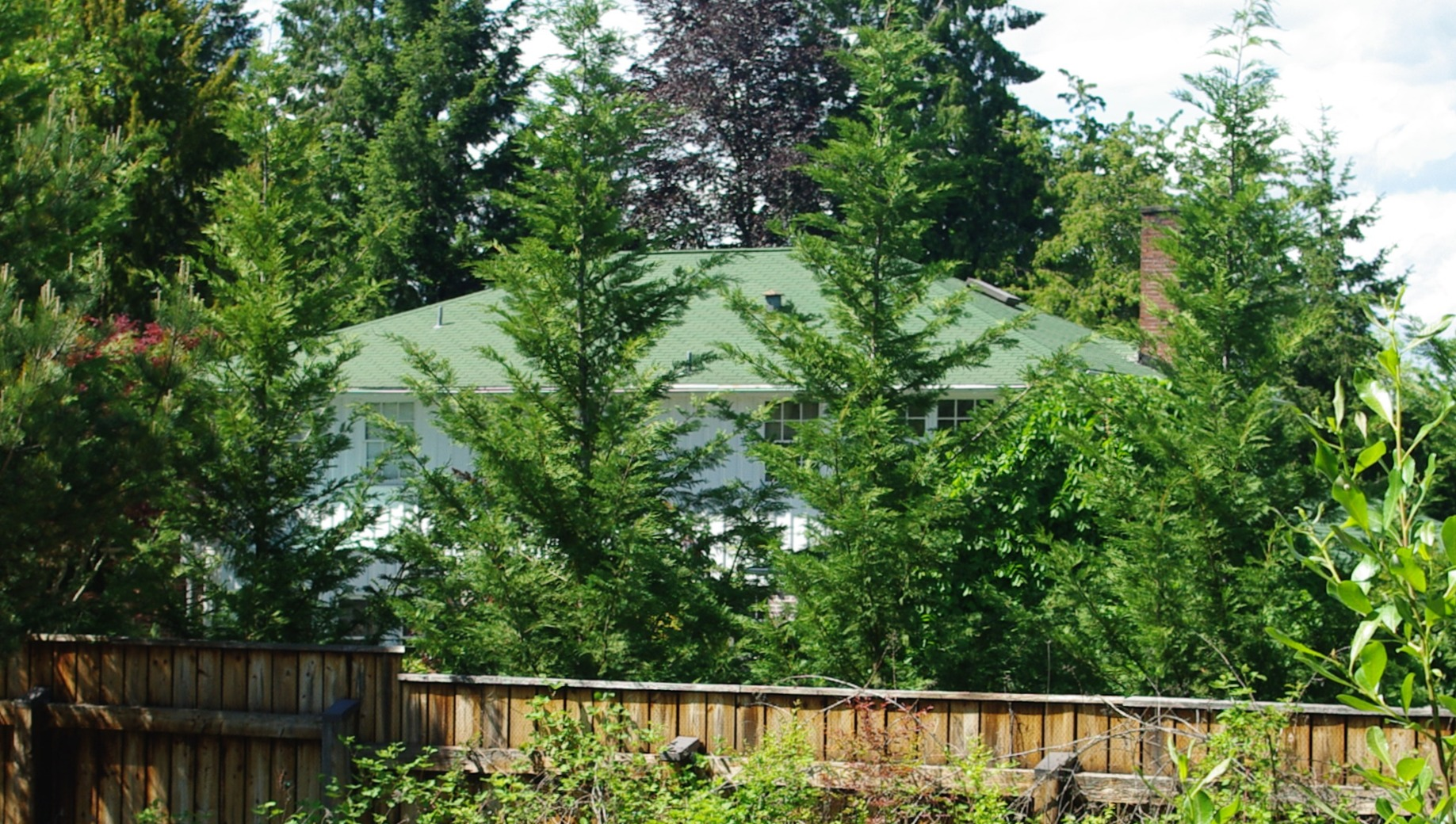
- Rear facade of home

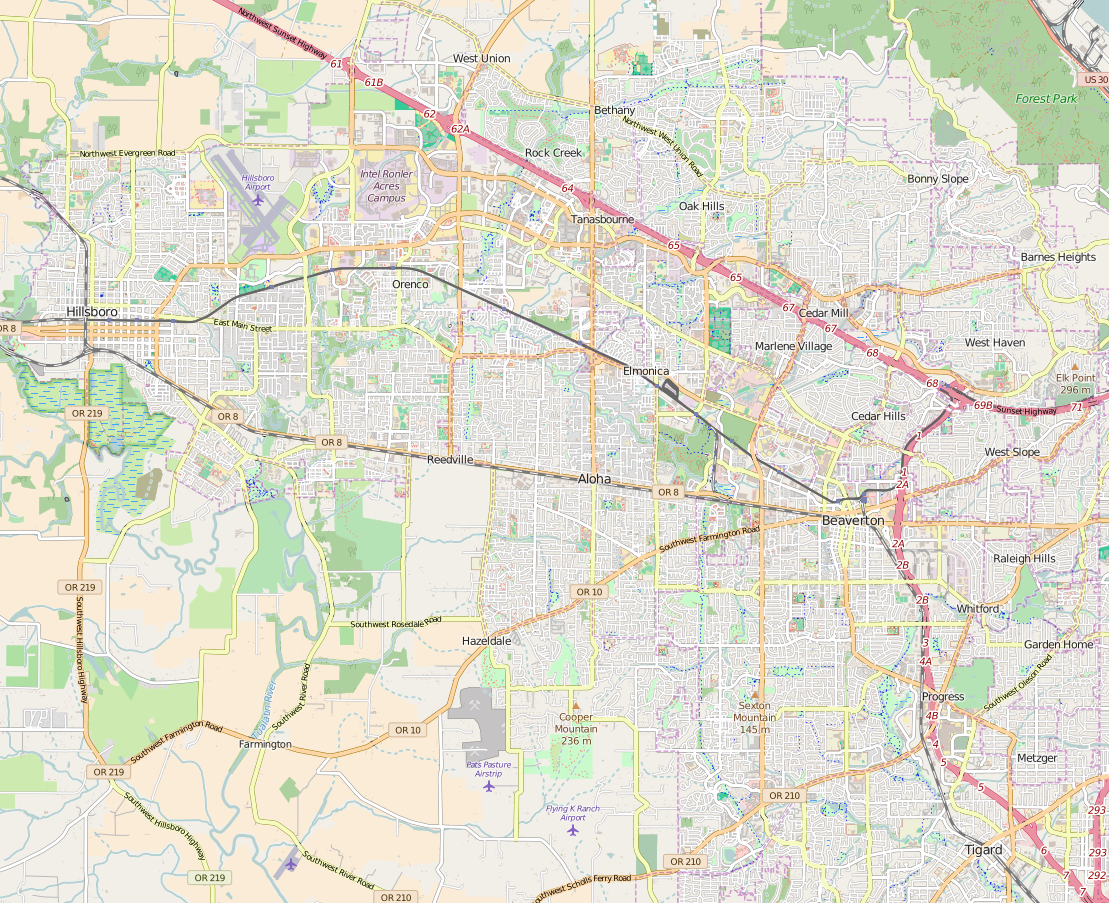
- Location within Hillsboro Beaverton OR
- Location: 5611 NE Elam Young Parkway, Hillsboro, Oregon 97124
- Coordinates: 45°31′50″N 122°55′15″W
- Built: 1935
- Architect: Charles W. Ertz
- Architectural style: Prairie School, Bungalow/craftsman
- NRHP reference No.: 93001504
- Added to NRHP: January 21, 1994

The Harold Wass Ray House is a historic home in Hillsboro in the U.S. state of Oregon. Built in 1935 for businessman Harold Wass Ray (1884–1969), it was listed on the National Register of Historic Places in 1994. The two-story structure is of a Prairie School and Craftsman in architectural style.

== History ==
In 1920, Ray and his father Albert started what became the Ray-Mailing Cannery, which later became part of Birdseye Frozen Foods. The younger Ray bought the Hawthorn Farm from Rachel Hawthorn in 1933. The farm, then east of Hillsboro, was around 400 acres (160 ha) and grew over the years with Ray adding more parcels of land to his holdings later totaling about 410 acres (170 ha). Ray made his money from food processing and growing hops, and also raised thoroughbred horses. He had a race track on his farm and was instrumental in the creation of Portland Meadows race track.

Ray had a two-story home built on the property in 1935, which was designed by Portland, Oregon, architect Charles Ertz. He sold his farm to the Hawthorn Farm Company and other investors after 1960. Intel's Quadrant Corporation purchased the property in 1978 and created its Hawthorn Farm Campus. An exterior swimming pool was built on the property in 1979. A small portion of the property remained as Ray's and his estate later was awarded condemnation proceeds from TriMet in 1999 due to the construction of the MAX Blue Line. Val Cady bought the 4.85-acre (1.96 ha) home site with the historic building in 1993, which the home was added to the NRHP in 1994. Cady operated a bed and breakfast at the house until 1995, and put the house on the market in 2006. The property with the home was purchased in 2007 by Beardsley Building Development in an effort to restore the house to its original condition.

== House ==
The Ray House was designed by Charles Ertz, who also designed the Laurelhurst Theater in Portland as well as his own home, the Charles W. Ertz House, that was once listed on the NRHP. Of blended architectural styles, the 4,100 square feet (380 m^{2}) two-story structure mixes prairie style and traditional farmhouse elements. Located along Elam Young Parkway at Orenco Creek, the walls are of brick and board and batten siding. The concrete foundation encloses a full basement. The interior contains an oak hardwood floor and is decorated with Spanish Colonial arts and crafts furniture.

== See also ==
- Registered Historic Places in Hillsboro, Oregon
