= World Forestry Center =

Educational institution in Oregon, U.S.

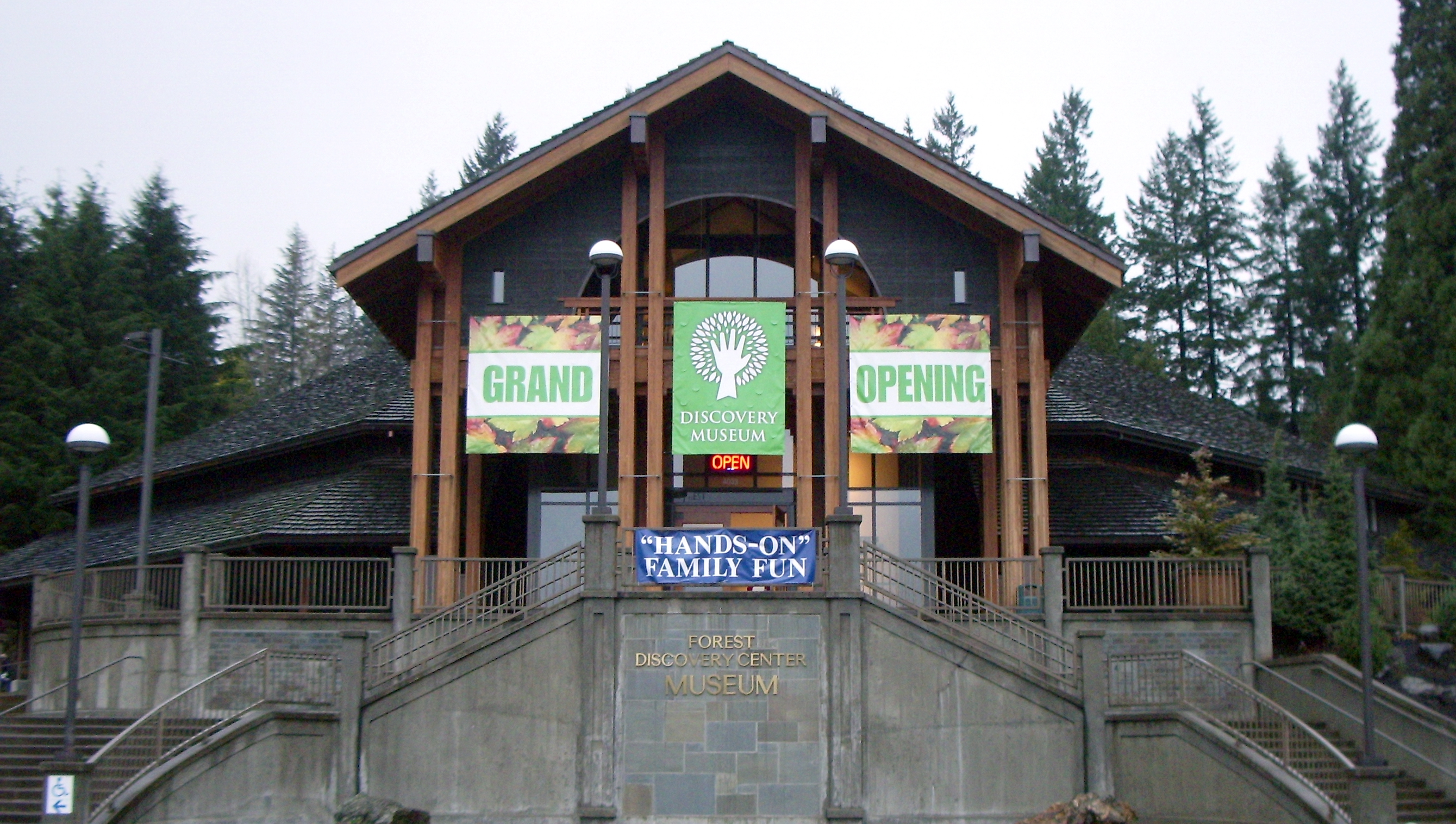
- Forestry Center Main building

- Location within Portland, Oregon
- Established: 1964; 62 years ago (organization); 1971; 55 years ago (facility)
- Location: Portland, Oregon, U.S.
- Coordinates: 45.510635°N 122.717895°W
- Type: Private: forestry
- Public transit access: Washington Park
- Website: worldforestry.org

The World Forestry Center is a nonprofit educational institution in Portland in the U.S. state of Oregon. Located near the Oregon Zoo in Washington Park, the organization was established in 1964 as the Western Forestry Center, with the actual building opening in 1971.

== History ==
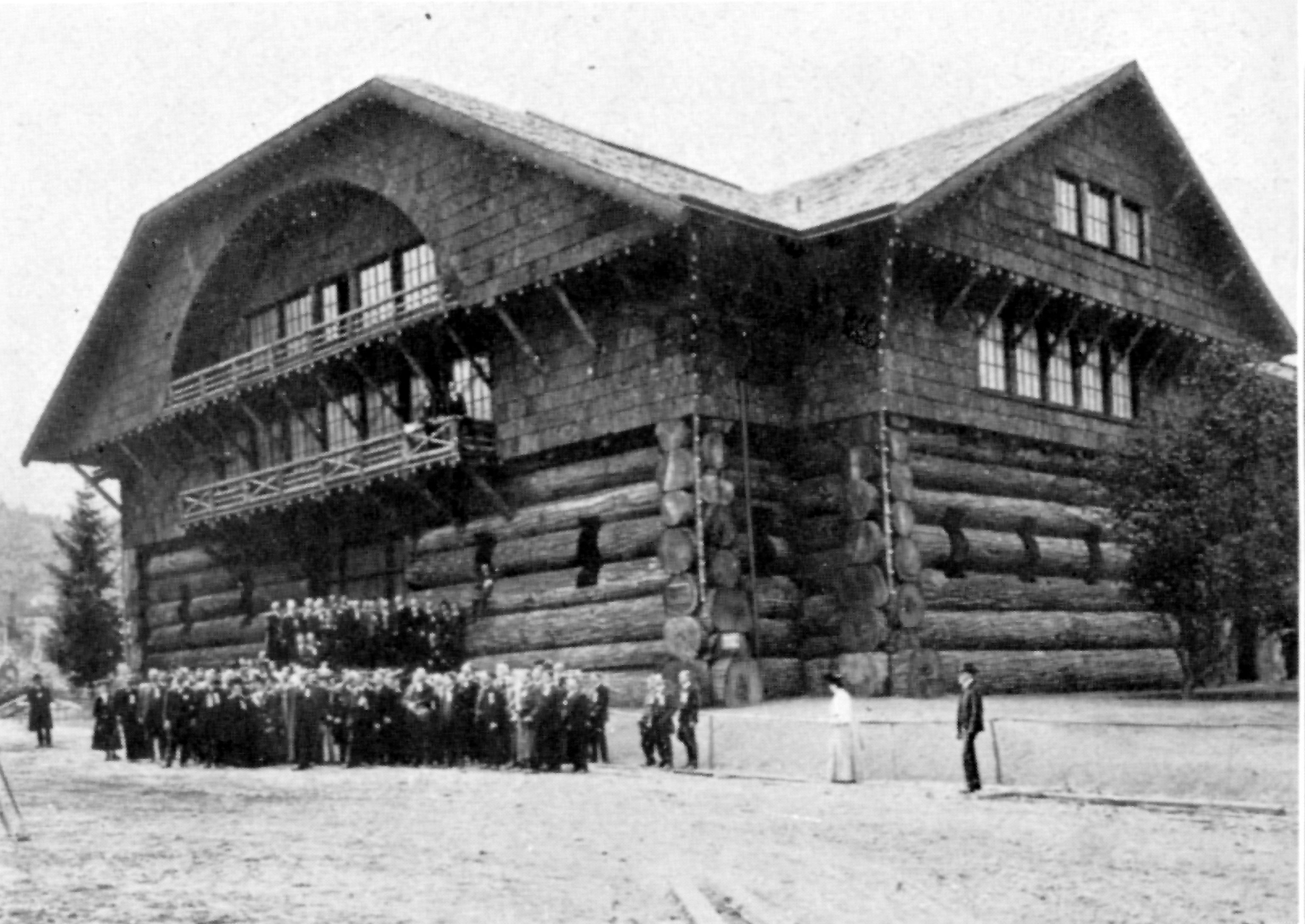
Forestry Building in about 1905

The World Forestry Center has its roots in the 1905 Lewis and Clark Centennial American Pacific Exposition and Oriental Fair for which an enormous log cabin was built of huge native trees and advertised as the world's largest. Public interest in the Forestry Building, which was turned over to the State of Oregon, lasted long after the exposition ended, right up until it was destroyed by fire on August 17, 1964.

Soon after the fire, a group of civic and industry leaders conceived The Western Forestry Center. A new, more fire-resistant forestry building designed by Oregon architect John Storrs was built in Washington Park. It opened to the public on June 5, 1971. On June 30, 2005, after a $7 million (~$10.8 million in 2024), 6-month renovation, the 20,000-square-foot (1,900 m^{2}) museum reopened with new interactive exhibits about the sustainability of forests and trees of the Pacific Northwest and the world.

== Programs ==
The World Forestry Center's mission is to "educate and inform people about the world's forests and trees, and their importance to all life, in order to promote a balanced and sustainable future".

The center achieves its mission with three programs: the Discovery Museum, two donated working forests—the Magness Memorial Tree Farm and the Johnson-Swanson Tree Farm—and the World Forest Institute which was established in 1989. The primary program is the International Fellowship Program.

In 1989, the World Forestry Center established the World Forest Institute to meet a growing demand for forestry information. As the forestry sector becomes increasingly complex, there is a greater need for international collaboration and exchange of information on forest trade, regulation, management, and forest resources. The World Forest Institute was created through the vision and support of Harry A. Merlo, a pioneer of the forest products industry, and an early visionary of the globalization of the forestry sector.

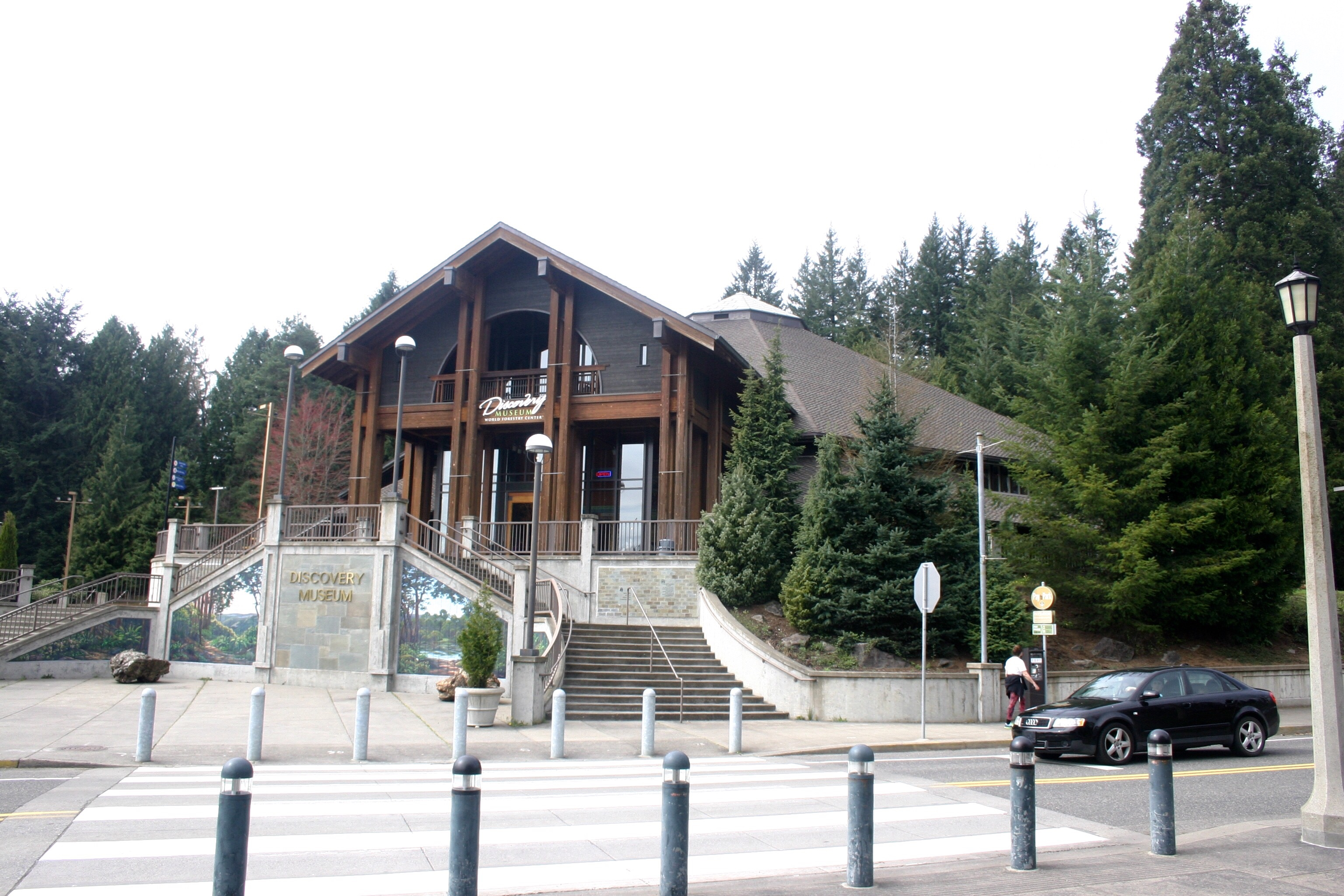
The forestry center in 2016

The fellowship program brings young forestry and forest products professionals from around the world to work at the World Forest Institute for 6 to 12 months. Fellows are commonly sponsored by their employer, government institutions, the forest industry, or an NGO, and carry out applied research projects of interest to their sponsors. In addition to completing a practical research project, the program works to get Fellows a broad exposure to natural resource management in the U.S. so that when they return to their home countries they have a basic understanding of the owners and managers of land and natural resources throughout the country.

The institute won the 2012 Portland Mayor's International Business Award from the Oregon Consular Corps. This award recognizes businesses that contribute to a global environment in Oregon.

The World Forestry Center campus also accommodates three other buildings: Julian N. Cheatham Hall, Harold A. Miller Hall and Harry A. Merlo Hall, which houses the administrative offices and the World Forest Institute.

=== The Leadership Hall of Fame ===
The Leadership Hall of Fame commemorates people who have made important contributions to forestry. The photographs and biographies of nearly 200 forestry leaders are displayed in three chests constructed of select Black Walnut from the Eastern United States

=== Logging locomotive on display ===
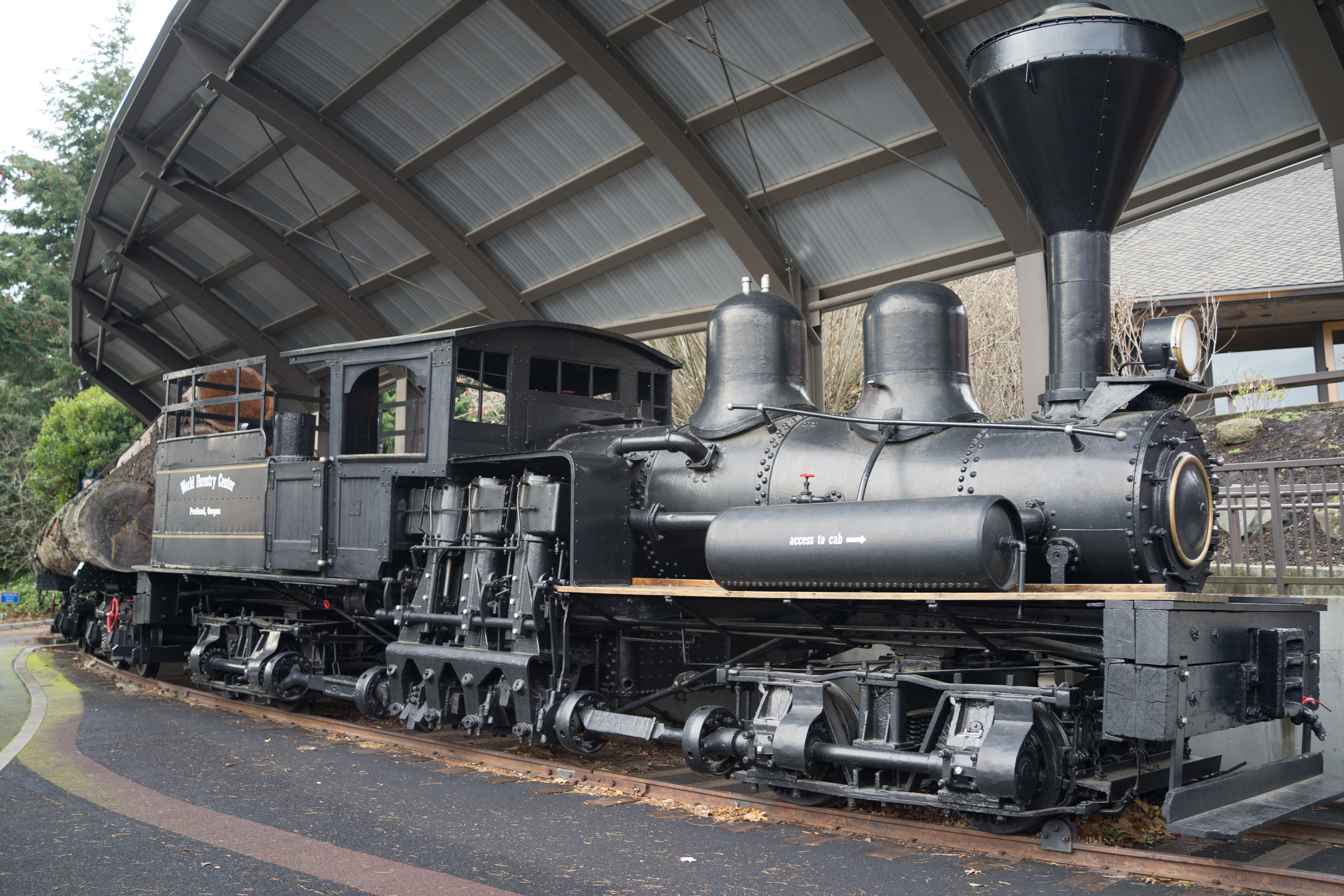
The steam locomotive on permanent display in front of the center

On display on the World Forestry Center's grounds is a steam locomotive nicknamed "Peggy" and a log on railroad disconnect trucks. This locomotive is a Class B-42 Shay locomotive used as a logging workhorse in the forests of the Pacific Northwest. Built in 1909 by Lima Locomotive Works in Lima, Ohio, she was shipped to a distributor in Seattle and was a few years later purchased by the Stimson Lumber Company as their locomotive No. 1. "Peggy" worked in the forests of Belfair, Washington, and then in Gaston, Oregon. The locomotive survived the fires of the Tillamook Burn and was retired from active service in 1950. "Peggy" was donated to the City of Portland in 1955 and was first displayed at the original Forestry Building, which was built in 1905 for the Lewis and Clark Centennial Exposition. She was damaged in the 1964 fire that destroyed that original Forestry Building and was then moved to "Oaks Pioneer Park" in southeast Portland for storage, the site of other locomotives owned by the City of Portland. The Pacific Northwest Chapter of the National Railway Historical Society rebuilt the cab and wood sills between 1969 and 1971, in preparation for the locomotive's 1972 relocation to the World Forestry Center in Washington Park. "Peggy" was placed under a roof there in 2003.

== Public access ==
Parking at the World Forestry Center costs $2.40 per hour, to a maximum of $9.60 per day. The Washington Park light rail station provides regional public transit access to the World Forestry Center.

== See also ==
- Culture of Portland, Oregon
- Montgomery Park (Portland, Oregon), a building sited next to the original Forestry Building
- Vaughn Street Park, a baseball stadium that also neighbored the original Forestry Building
