= Tualatin Mountains =

Mountain range in Oregon, United States

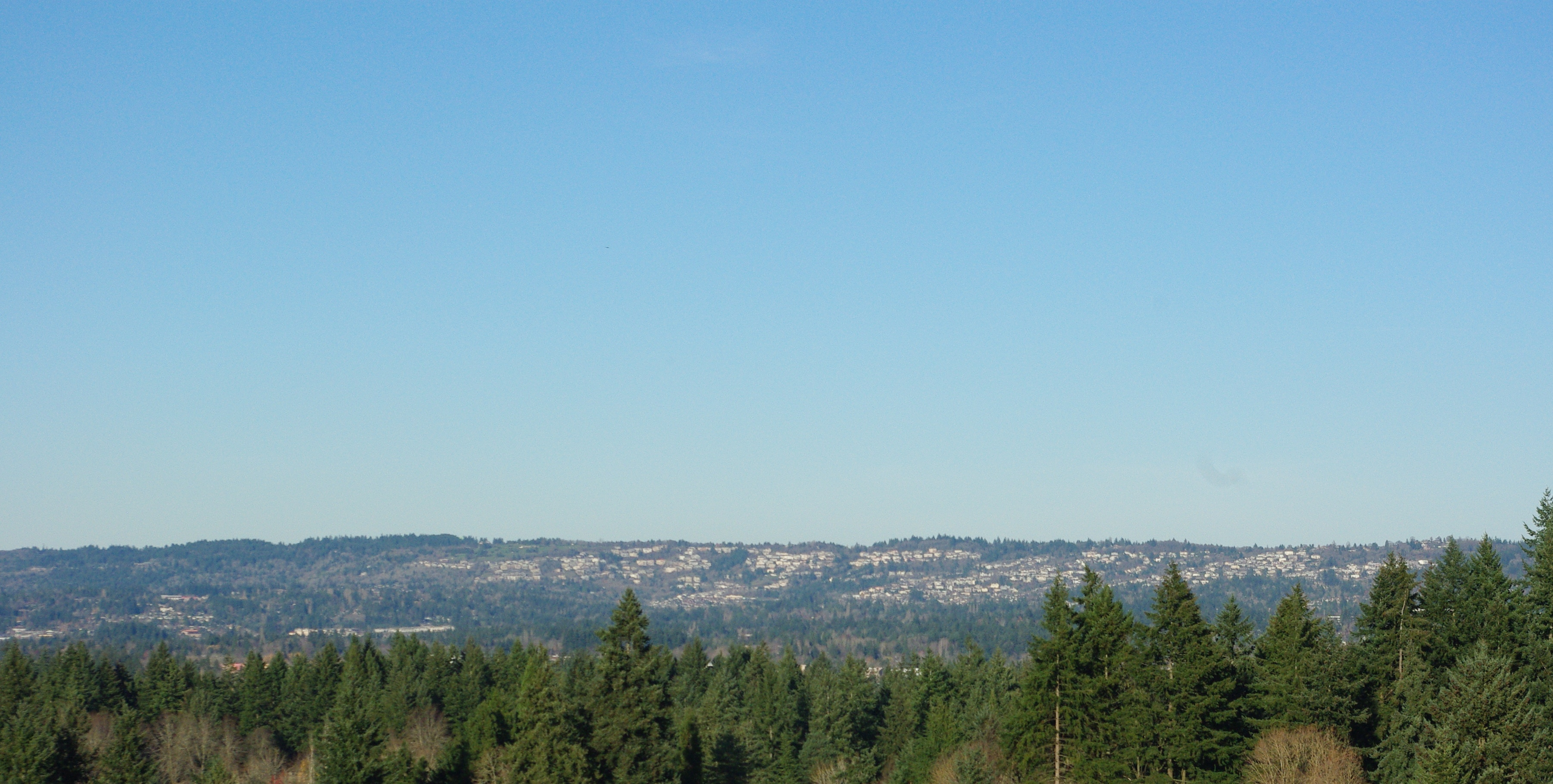
- West slope of the mountains from Beaverton looking north

Highest point
- Peak: Dixie Mountain
- Elevation: 1,609 ft (490 m)
- Coordinates: 45°31′35″N 122°45′11″W

Geography
- Location within Oregon
- Country: United States
- State: Oregon
- District: Multnomah County
- Range coordinates: 45°34′50″N 122°47′45″W
- Topo map: USGS Linnton

Geology
- Mountain type: Lava flows
- Volcanic field: Boring Lava Field, Columbia River Basalt Group
- Last eruption: 7 million years ago

The Tualatin Mountains (also known as the West Hills or Southwest Hills of Portland) are a range on the western border of Multnomah County, Oregon, United States. A spur of the Northern Oregon Coast Range, they separate the Tualatin Basin of Washington County, Oregon, from the Portland Basin of western Multnomah County and Clark County, Washington.

The highest peak in the range is Dixie Mountain at 1,609 feet (490 m). Other notable peaks include Cornell Mountain at 1,270 feet (390m), Council Crest at 1,073 feet (327 m), and Pittock Hill, location of the Pittock Mansion.

Despite steep slopes, periodic landslides, and multiple earthquake faults, many residences have been built in the Tualatin Mountains, though much of the northern portion is undeveloped land within the 5,000-acre (20 km^{2}) Forest Park. The landscape, inside and outside the park, is predominantly forested.

== History ==
The hills date from the late Cenozoic era, and range up to over 1,000 feet (300 m). Composed mainly of basalt, the mountains were formed by several flows of the Grande Ronde basalt flows that were part of the larger Columbia River basalts. Human settlement goes back 10,000 years to the area's earliest known residents, the Chinook people.

U.S. Route 26 (the Sunset Highway) is the principal transportation link through the hills, traveling through the Vista Ridge Tunnels, Tanner Creek Canyon, and over the crest of Sylvan Hill. This route through the hills connecting the agricultural Tualatin Basin to the navigable Willamette River was developed as a plank road in the 19th century. The Great Plank Road (Canyon/Jefferson Road) was a major factor in the early growth of the city of Portland.

Since 1998, the west side MAX Light Rail has run roughly parallel to US 26 through the hills, including a section tunneled deep underground.

== Radio broadcasters ==
The Tualatin Mountains are home to the transmitter for iHeartMedia's KLTH.

== See also ==
- List of Oregon mountain ranges
- Southwest Hills, Portland, Oregon
