= Sonrise Church =

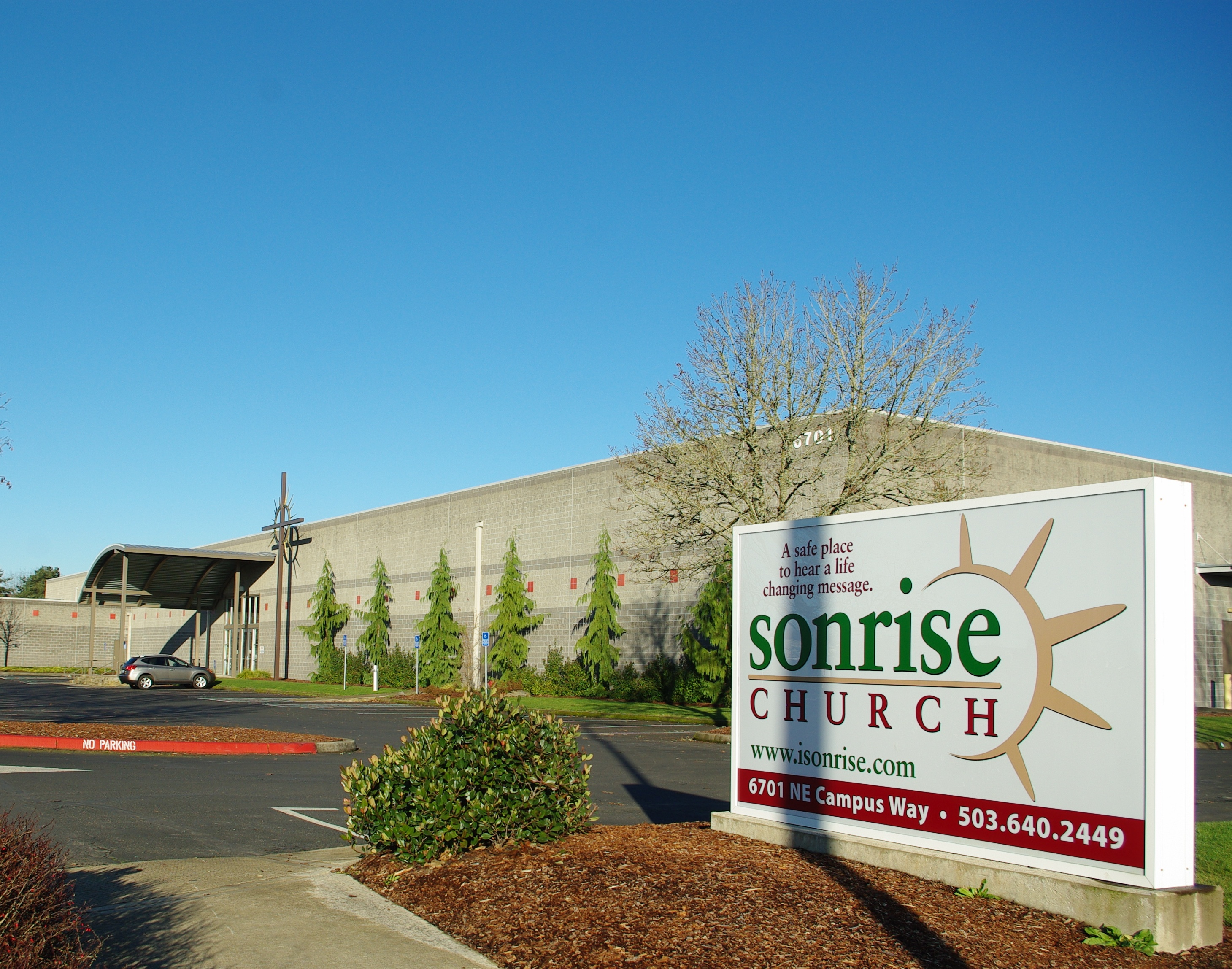
- Main entrance
- Sonrise Church
- 45.5334°N 122.9107°W
- Location: Hillsboro, Oregon
- Country: United States
- Denomination: Conservative Baptist
- Website: isonrise.com

History
- Former name: Sonrise Baptist Church
- Founded: 1980

Architecture
- Functional status: Active
- Architectural type: Industrial

Clergy
- Pastor: Paul Crandell
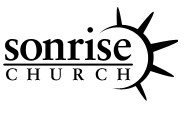

Sonrise Church is a Conservative Baptist church in Hillsboro in the U.S. state of Oregon. Founded in 1980 as Sonrise Baptist Church, the church is located in the Orenco neighborhood and has about 1,200 worshipers at its main campus, a former industrial building.

== History ==
Sonrise Baptist Church was started in 1980 in Hillsboro, Oregon, by families including T. Bronleewe, G. Robert and Loretta Schwarz, with Larry E. Allen as pastor. In October 1981, it received approval from the city to build a 10,600-square-foot (980 m^{2}) structure at the then location near Jackson School and Northeast Ninth Avenue. The new building was to be used as the church’s sanctuary. Sonrise Baptist built a new building at the original church location on NE Rogahn Street in 2000. In 1998, Americans United for Separation of Church and State alleged that Sonrise was one of nine churches in the country that violated federal tax law by distributing voter guides seen as pro-Republican.

In 2006, Sonrise started Washington County Project Homeless Connect, a one-day, annual event that provides a variety of services to the homeless, including pet care, medical care, counseling, and legal services. Other partners in the program as of 2012 included Pacific University, Vision Action Network, and Hands On Greater Portland, among others. The 2009 event had visits by about 500 homeless people served by approximately 450 volunteers.

The church offered to buy about 9.7 acres (3.9 ha) that included a 54,000-square-foot (5,000 m^{2}) industrial building owned by Toshiba Ceramics America for $4.5 million in October 2006. Sonrise’s offer was for only half of the site, which had been the proposed location for a hospital by Providence Health System in 2003. At the time of the purchase, Sonrise had grown to 700 in its congregation. Toshiba Ceramics had opened its factory on the site in 1989 and closed it in April 2002.

Sonrise moved into the former Toshiba facility near Cornell Road and Northwest 231st Avenue (now Century Blvd.) in 2007. The nearly 10-acre (4.0 ha) campus in the Orenco neighborhood is next to Quatama Elementary School. The church added a community garden in 2009 in partnership with the Hillsboro Parks & Recreation Department, with a second phases with more plots added the following year. Later in 2009, Heritage Christian School closed, and Carden Cascade Academy moved into the classroom space at the church in September.

Sonrise opened a homeless shelter at the church in December 2008 that opened during cold weather. The next year it opened in December for a 90-day run, staffed by volunteers from nine area churches, calling it the Shelter at Orenco Station. The church also serves as a cooling center during extreme heat in the summer.

Sonrise opened a second church in April 2012 in Forest Grove. At the time, Sonrise had grown to about 1,500 people. The new location opened in an 8,000-square-foot (740 m^{2}) former retail space belonging to Tupper’s Home Furnishings, and was to be led by Rudy Tinoco. The church faced controversy in November 2012 when parents in the area brought their complaints to local media about meetings held at the church for convicted felons. Participants at the meetings included registered sex offenders, and parents raised the concern that Quatama Elementary was adjacent to the church. The church said it would consider moving the meetings if a suitable location could be found.

== Facilities ==
The church has three locations on the Westside of the Portland metropolitan area: the main campus in Hillsboro, one in Forest Grove, and one in Cornelius. The main campus in Hillsboro is near the Orenco Station light rail stop along Cornell Road. The building is 54,000 square feet (5,000 m^{2}) in size and sits on 9.77 acres (3.95 ha). In addition to the sanctuary, the grounds house classrooms, a seasonal 45-bed homeless shelter, and a community garden operated through the city’s parks department.
