= Orenco =

Orenco may refer to:

- Orenco Station, Hillsboro, Oregon, a planned community in Hillsboro, Oregon, United States
- Orenco, Oregon, a former town and current neighborhood in Hillsboro, Oregon, United States
- Oregon Nursery Company, a former company whose name was combined to make the term Orenco
- Orenco station (TriMet), a light rail train stop in Hillsboro, Oregon, United States
- Orenco (aircraft manufacturer), a defunct American aircraft manufacturer
