= Orenco, Oregon =

- Neighborhood
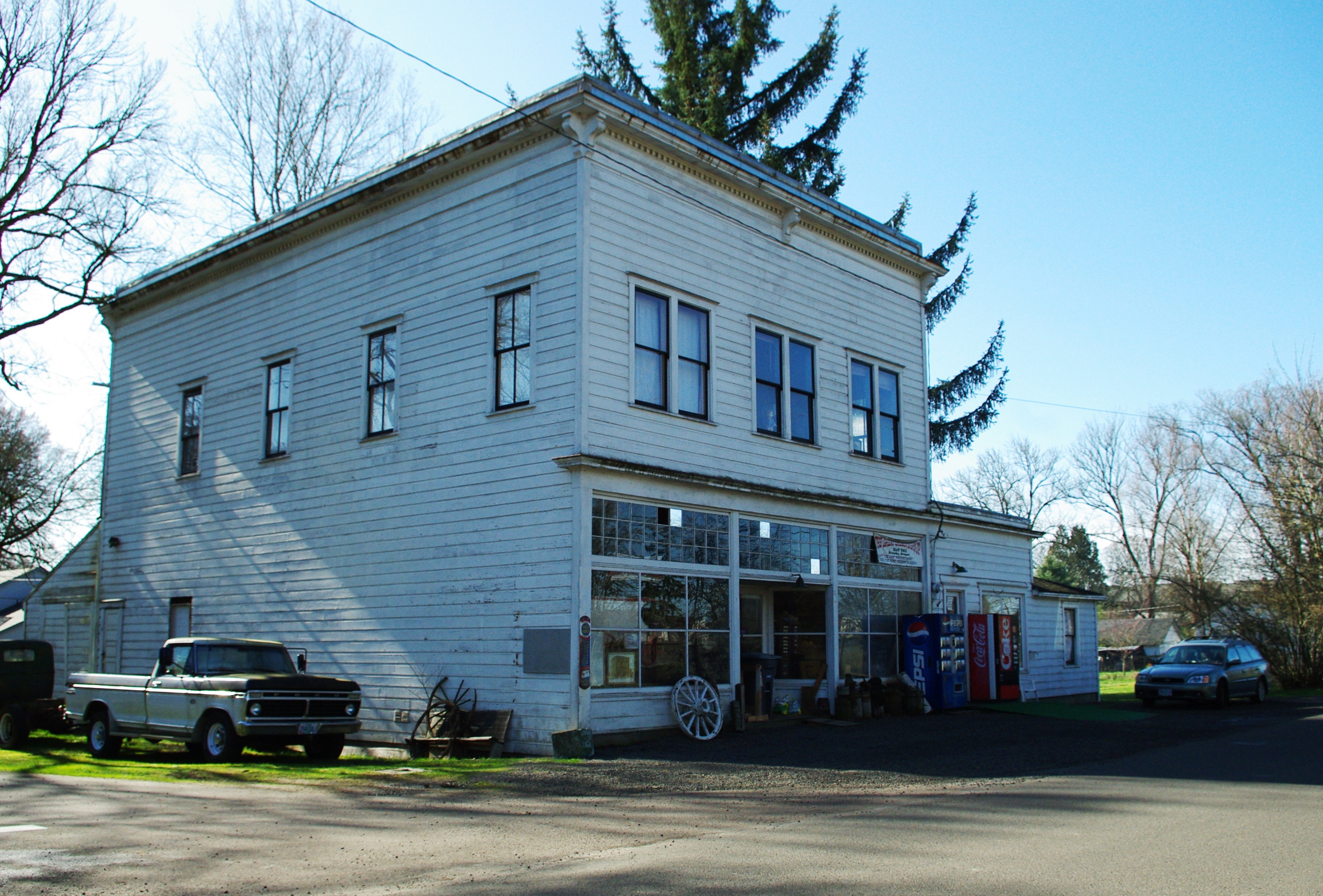
- Former store in the older section of Orenco
- Etymology: OREgon Nursery COmpany
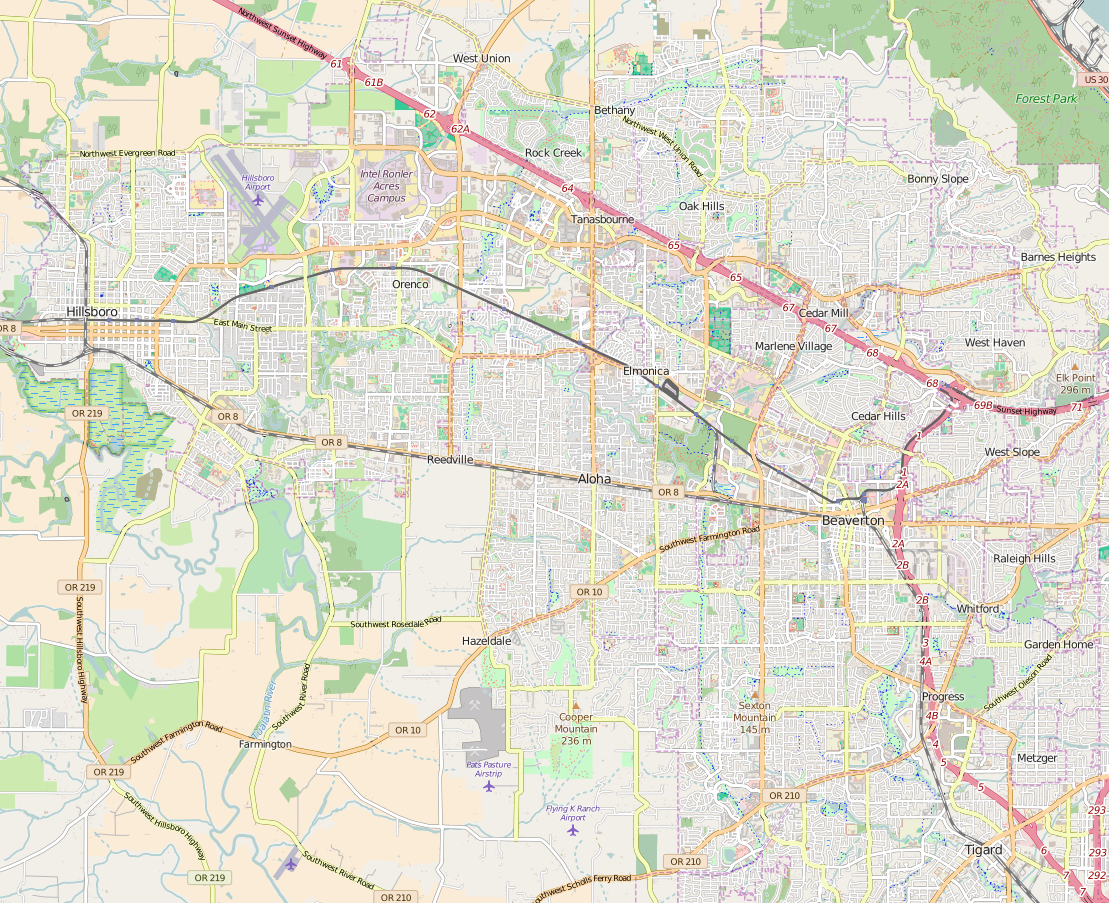
- Location within the Hillsboro area Orenco, Oregon (Oregon) Orenco, Oregon (the United States)
- Coordinates: 45°31′43″N 122°54′40″W
- Country: United States
- State: Oregon
- County: Washington County
- City: Hillsboro
- Elevation: 190 ft (58 m)
- Time zone: Pacific
- ZIP code: 97124
- Area codes: 503 and 971

Orenco (/ɒrˈrɛnkoʊ/, orr-REN-koh) is a former company town in Washington County, Oregon, United States, located between Hillsboro and Aloha. The former community of Orenco now forms the Orenco neighborhood in Hillsboro, which is the site of the Orenco Station housing development.

The community was established in 1905 as a company town by the Oregon Nursery Company, within a 1200-acre (4.9 km^{2}) area owned by the company. The name Orenco is a composite of the company's initials. The Oregon Electric Railway established Orenco Station in 1908, and Orenco post office operated from 1909 to 1963. The Oregon Nursery Company shut down during the depression. Orenco later became part of Hillsboro. The company was responsible for introducing the Orenco Apple, a dessert apple, in the early 20th century.

== Geography ==
Orenco is located in the Tualatin Valley, with Rock Creek and other smaller streams running through the area. Major roads in the area include U.S. Route 26, Cornelius Pass Road, Cornell Road, NW 231st Avenue, and Baseline Road.

Orenco's approximate location is northeast Hillsboro, north of Baseline Road, south of Cornell Road, west of Cornelius Pass Road, and east of Shute Road. Unlike the town of Orenco, the present-day neighborhood of the same name extends north of Cornell Road, with the Orenco Station area.

== History ==
Historical population
Census	Pop.	Note	%±
1910	75		—
1920	335		346.7%
1950	313		—
1960	400		27.8%
1970	200		−50.0%
1980	450		125.0%
1990	450		0.0%

European American pioneers first arrived in the Orenco area in the mid-1850s, after the Donation Land Claim Act of 1850 encouraged settlers to travel to Oregon. The Orenco area was cleared by Chinese laborers employed by a number of local farmers.

At the turn of the century Archibald McGill and Malcolm McDonald formed the Oregon Nursery Company. In May 1906, the Oregon Nursery Company purchased 170 acres (0.69 km^{2}) in Washington County, Oregon where they would begin building a large nursery operation. In 1908, the town of Orenco was founded with the suggestion of the name coming from Anna Lisky McNew. The townsite was largely on the Donation Land Claim of William H. Bennett. Also in 1908, the Oregon Electric Railway began interurban service on its line between Forest Grove and Portland. The Orenco school district was formed on December 21, split from the Shute school district. Many of the first families in the town were Hungarians the company recruited and relocated from the Eastern European country. In 1909, the Orenco Presbyterian Church was founded in June. By 1910 the town had grown to over 500 residents and on December 6 the community organized a volunteer fire department.

H. V. Meade began printing the town's paper, the Orenco Herald in 1914. The next year Orenco built its city hall that contained both the fire department and a jail. Enrollment at the school district reached 169 students by 1913. On January 6, 1913, the residents voted to incorporate the community. At this time the city consisted of a dry goods store, a hotel, two grocery stores, a blacksmith shop, a hardware store, a lumber yard, ice cream parlor, and a printing shop. Services in the town were water, sewer, telephones, electricity, street lighting, and a third-class post office.

In 1924, the city was the setting for a movie about the North-West Mounted Police by a Beaverton film studio. The Oregon Electric Railway (OE) closed its freight depot at Orenco in August 1928. Then in 1929, the Great Depression helped lead to the dissolution of the Oregon Nursery Company. With this development, many other businesses shut down and many residents moved away. In 1932, OE discontinued its interurban (passenger) service to Orenco, when the railroad company closed its Forest Grove line, with only freight trains continuing to use the rail line thereafter (until the line's abandonment in 1977). In 1938, residents voted to dissolve the municipal corporation.

Oregon Nursery Company founder Malcolm McDonald's home, listed on the National Register of Historic Places, is still located on the north end of the property that was formerly The Orenco Woods Golf Course. The golf course opened in 1953 and was owned and operated by the Hillsboro Elks Lodge until it was sold to developers and closed in 2006. Due to the Great Recession, the land was not developed, and in 2013 it became the Orenco Woods Nature Park.

== Points of interest ==
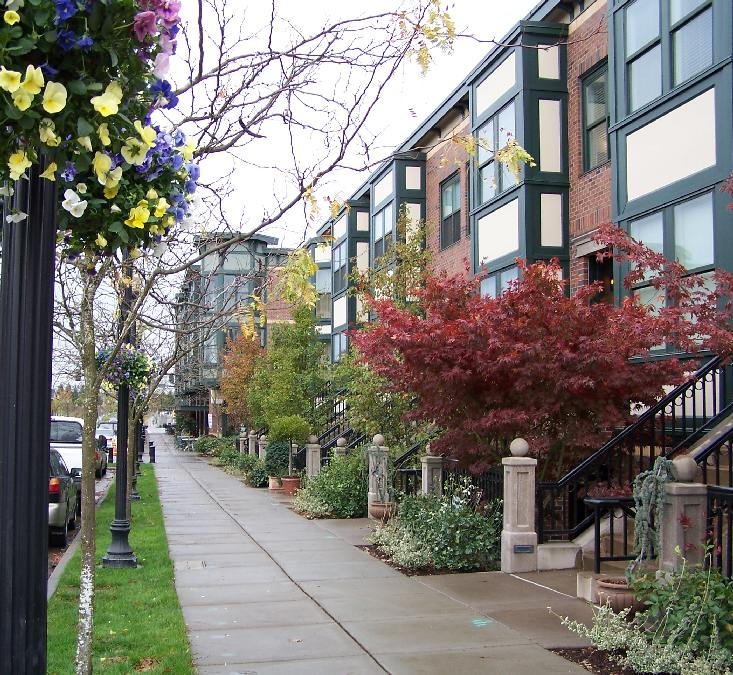
Orenco Station community

- Orenco Station is a smart growth community in Hillsboro that takes its name from the former community of Orenco.
- The Orenco MAX station on the MAX Blue Line is named after the community.
- East–west-running streets in the former community are all named after trees, and are in alphabetical order starting with Alder and ending with Fir.
- Imbrie Farm from the National Register of Historic Places is located just north of Orenco.
- The neighborhood contains two elementary schools of the Hillsboro School District: Orenco Elementary, in the historical part of Orenco, and Quatama Elementary, in the newer Orenco Station area.
- The Hillsboro Elks Lodge is located in Orenco.
- In the vicinity are Intel's Ronler Acres and Hawthorn Farm facilities. Hillsboro Stadium is also near by.
