= Orenco station =

Orenco station may refer to:

- Orenco Station, Hillsboro, Oregon, a neighborhood of the city of Hillsboro
- Orenco station (TriMet), a light rail station on the MAX Light Rail system
- Orenco station, a station on the former Oregon Electric Railway passenger service between 1908 and 1928
