= Malcolm McDonald House =

United States historic place

- U.S. National Register of Historic Places
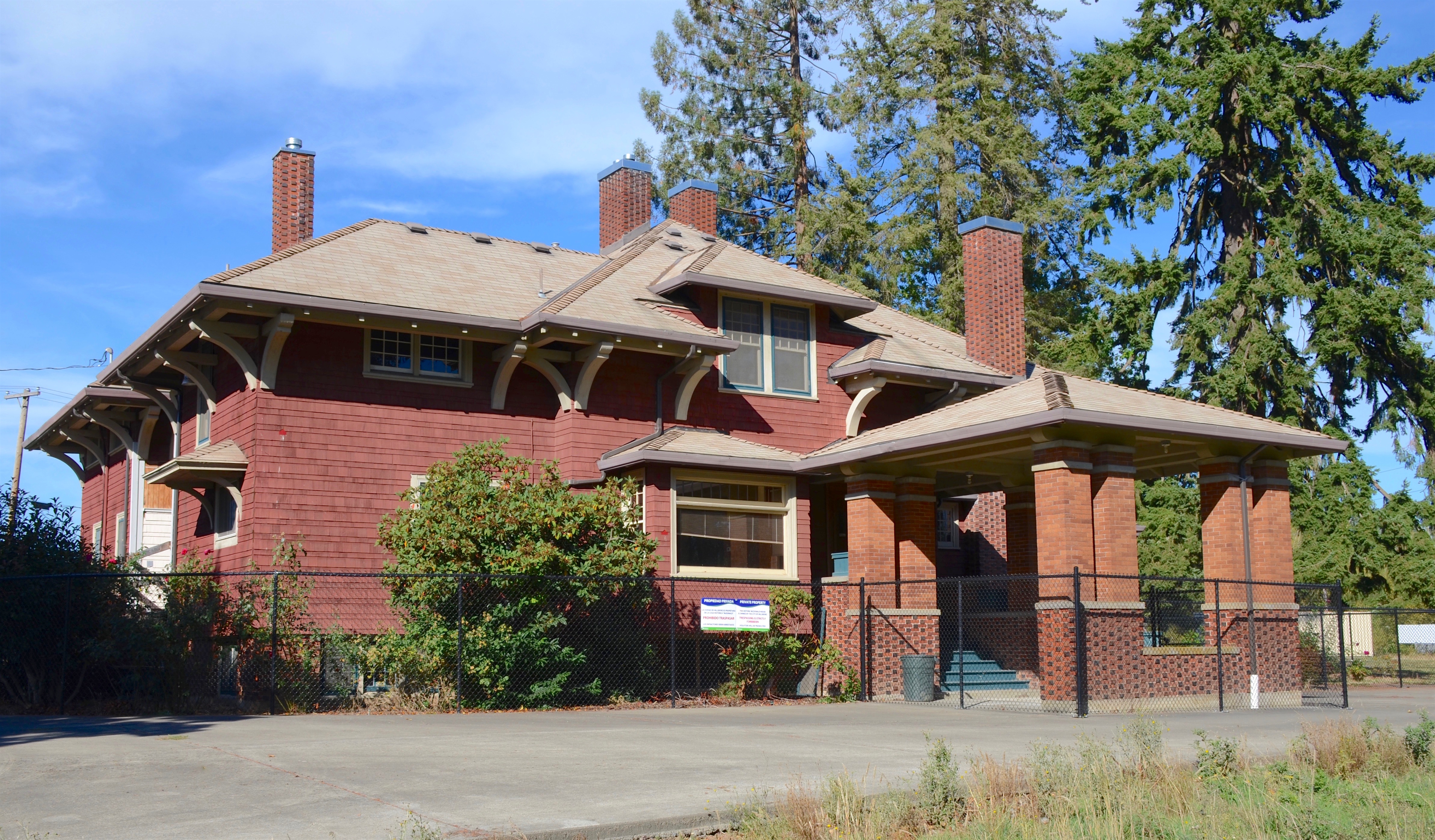
- The McDonald House in 2017

- Location within Oregon Location within the United States
- Location: 7250 Northeast Birch Street, Hillsboro, Oregon
- Coordinates: 45°31′39″N 122°54′17″W
- Built: 1912
- Architectural style: Craftsman architecture
- NRHP reference No.: 14001160
- Added to NRHP: 2015

Malcolm McDonald House is a dwelling located in the Orenco Woods Nature Park, in Hillsboro, Oregon. It was listed on the National Register of Historic Places in June 2015.

== History ==
The 5,553 sq ft (515.9 m^{2}) house was originally built for Oregon Nursery Company's founder Malcolm McDonald in 1912. It is situated on the 1,200 acres (490 ha) Orenco landholding (east of Hillsboro), which was purchased by the McDonald in the early 1900s. Currently, the land is planted with apple trees and is part Orenco Woods Nature Park.

The design of the house follows Craftsman-style architecture which includes "deep open eaves with curved brackets" and "purlins". It also includes a broad entry porch, a variety of window types and wall surfaces with multiple chimneys.

It is sometimes called the McDonald-Russell House after McDonald, its first owner, and Eugene Russell who lived in the house while operating the Golf Course in the 1960s.

In 2014, the Hillsboro City Council initiated repairs and restoration works. As on 2017, the house is owned by the City of Hillsboro and is not currently open for public visits.
