= Washington County Fair (Oregon) =

Annual event in Hillsboro, Oregon

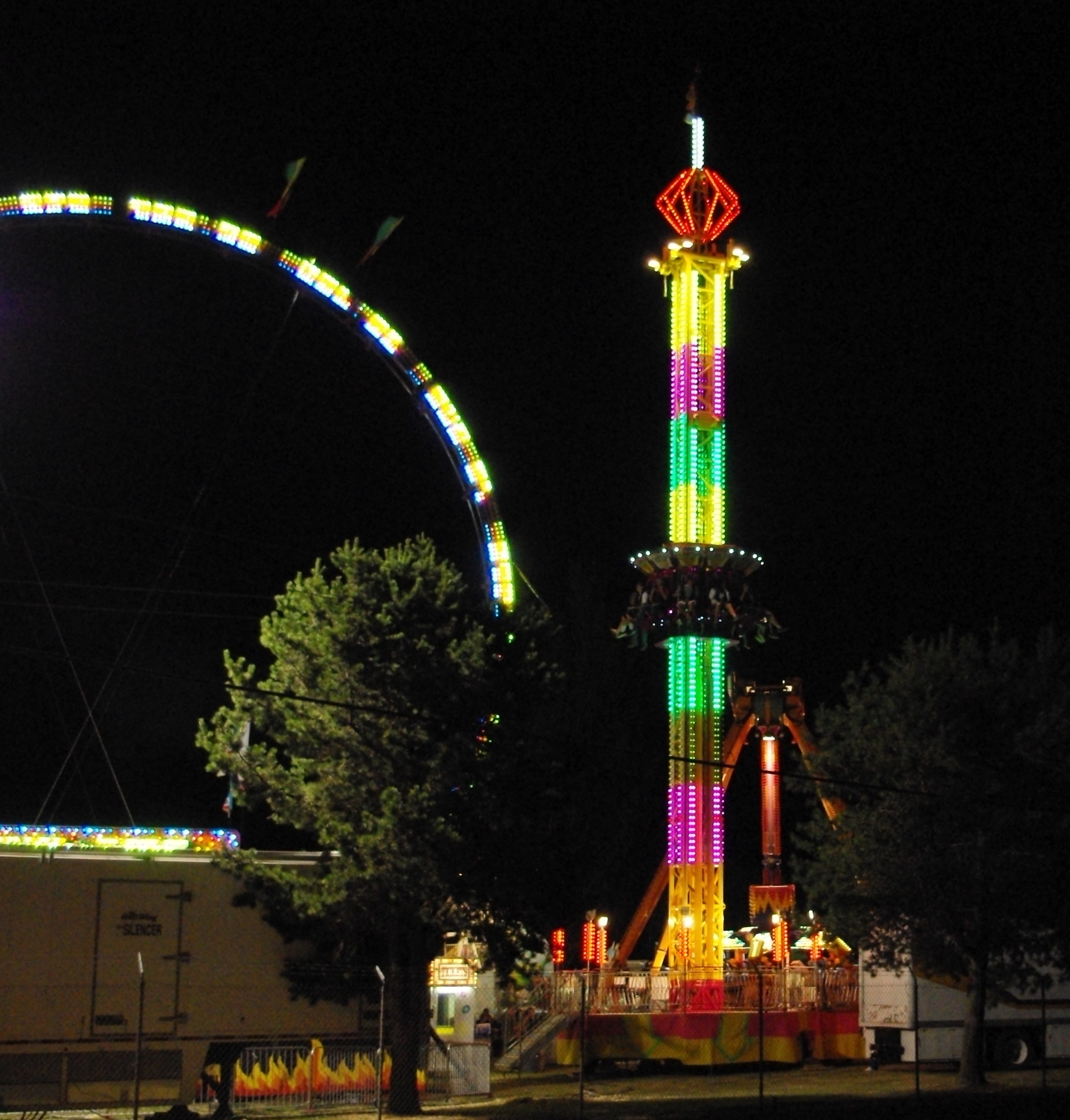
- Ride at the 2011 fair
- Genre: County fair
- Date: July
- Frequency: annual
- Location: Hillsboro, Oregon
- Attendance: 109,606 (2012)
- Website: bigfairfun.com

The Washington County Fair is an annual event held at the Westside Commons in Hillsboro, Oregon, United States. The fair includes amusement rides, live entertainment, livestock exhibits, and other exhibits held the last week of July.

== History ==
Pop singer Britney Spears performed at the fair in 1999. In 2012, singer/actress Miranda Cosgrove headlined the entertainment. Due to the planned attendance of the Blue Angels at the Oregon International Air Show, the fair overlapped with the air show in 2013 creating traffic issues with the air show held across Cornell Road at the Hillsboro Airport. The 2015 fair featured hip-hop artist Flo Rida as the main performer. During the 2016 fair, several people reported contracting E. coli, which led to the fair not allowing visitors to pet animals at the 2017 fair.

With 2020's cancellation as the result of COVID-19 pandemic, the event was deferred to 2021.

== Exhibits ==
The Washington County Fair hosts exhibits of farm animals, food, and flowers along with other type of specialty displays. Youth members of 4-H and Future Farmers of America participate by showing their animals and specialty collections. The fair also has an open class for individuals who want to show their livestock, cooking skills, or creative hobbies, but do not belong to an exhibiting organization. Awards are sponsored by local businesses, civic and service organizations, and individual donors.
