= Oregon Nursery Company =

Defunct plant nursery in Orenco, Oregon

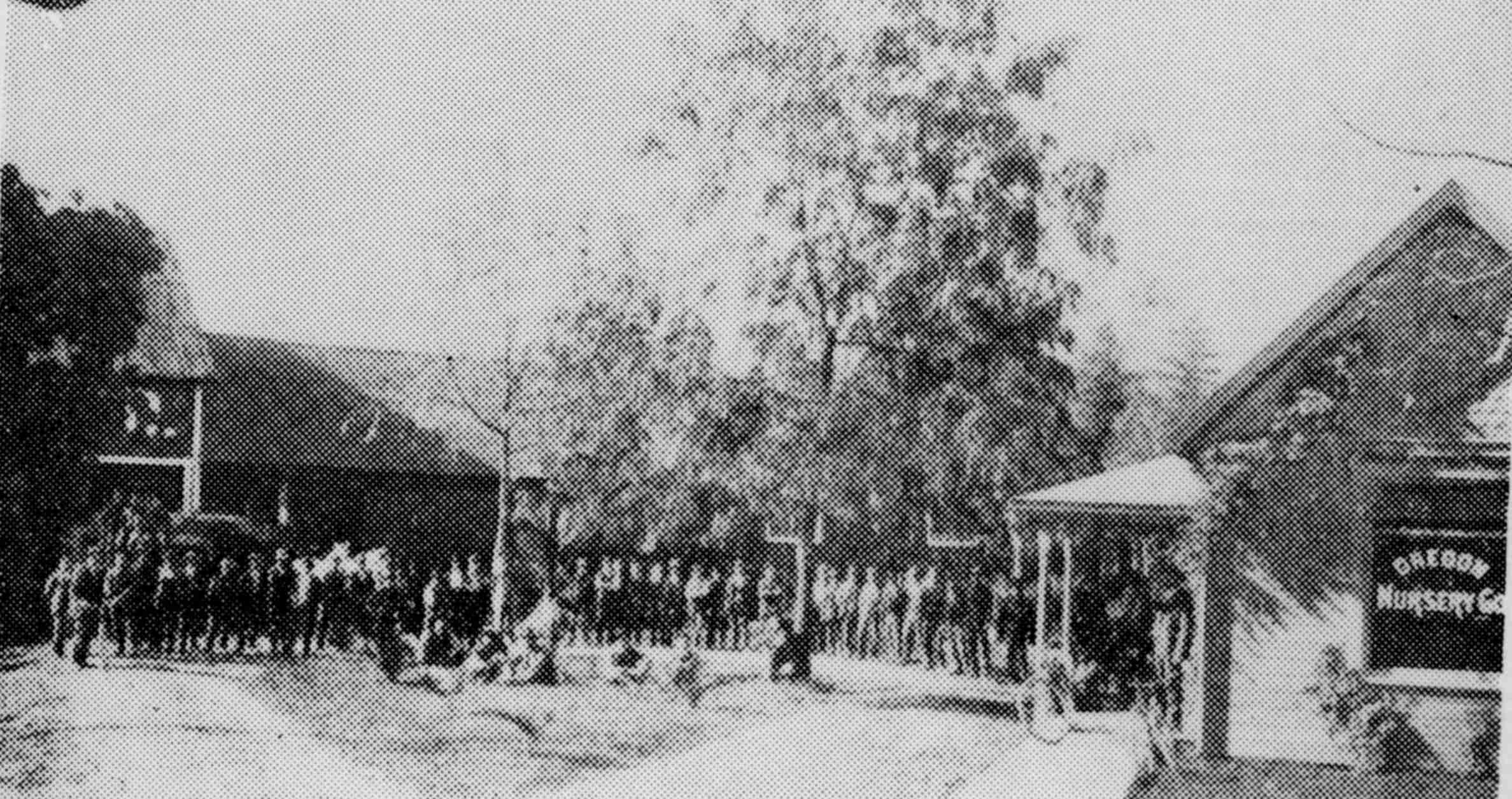
- Industry: Plant nursery
- Founded: 1867
- Defunct: 1927
- Fate: Bankrupt
- Headquarters: Orenco, Oregon, U.S.A.
- Key people: Malcolm McDonald; Archibald McGill
- Products: Fruits, nuts, berries, and nursery stock
- Number of employees: 150

The Oregon Nursery Company (also known as Orenco) was a nursery company founded and originally operated in Salem, Oregon, United States. The company later expanded to a site in Washington County, Oregon west of Portland. The entire operation was eventually moved to Washington County, where the company founded the town of Orenco. The company went bankrupt in 1927. Its legacy is the Orenco place name that is still widely used in the Hillsboro area.

== History ==
The Capital City Nursery company was founded by 1867. It originally operated from a site in Salem just east of the Willamette University campus, along State Street. The company changed its name to the Oregon Nursery Company in 1896 to reflect its expanding business. By 1904, the company was one of the largest nursery companies in the country, shipping nursery stock throughout the United States, Canada, and Mexico. It was well known enough that Luther Burbank chose the company to propagate his Maynard plum and introduce it into the market.

By the early 1890s the Oregon Nursery Company was being run by two Canadian Scots, Malcolm McDonald and Archibald McGill. In 1896, the partners decided to expand their operation into the Portland area. They purchased 640 acres (2.6 km^{2}) of farm land in rural Washington County 17 miles (27 km) west of Portland, in what is now Hillsboro. When a fire destroyed the company's packing plant in Salem in 1905, the entire business was moved to Washington County.

The first building to be built at the Washington County site was a 2-acre (8,100 m^{2}) packing shed, the largest building of its kind in the country. Because of its size the building was the home of the Washington County Fair for many years. Over the next several years, McDonald and McGill purchased additional farm land adjacent to their nursery, expanding the company's property to 1,200 acres (4.9 km^{2}). Most of the land was quickly planted with fruit trees, nut trees, shade trees, berries, and other nursery stock. In 1909, the company built a new office next to the packing shed. That same year, the Oregon Electric Railway opened a line to the Oregon Nursery Company site, offering the opportunity to further expand the company's business.

During that time, the company began sponsoring Hungarian immigrant families into the area to add to its workforce. To accommodate its workers, the company built residential homes, utilities, a school, and a church. It also encouraged small businesses to locate in the area. As a result, the town of Orenco was founded in 1908. The town name was an acronym for ORE-gon N-ursery CO-mpany. By 1910, the town population had reached 500, and a fire department was organized. The Orenco city hall was finished in 1912. The city of Orenco was officially incorporated on 6 January 1913, and Malcolm McDonald was elected the city's first mayor.

In 1913, the Oregon Nursery Company was at its peak of production and sales. Its 1,200 acres (4.9 km^{2}) were covered with millions of trees and shrubs, and its nursery stock was in great demand. On 21 June 1913, the company hosted a national horticultural event that brought three hundred nurserymen from around the country to visit the Orenco operation. A special train carried the attended from Portland to Orenco. A grand banquet was served in the packing shed, to impress the guests with the size of the building and show off company's modern processing and distribution facilities.

Before 1916, the company had expanded production significantly, anticipating a move into the European agriculture market. The company planted more than a million apple trees specifically for that purpose. However, the outbreak of World War I ended any hope of selling nursery stock in Europe for many years. As a result of slow moving inventory that cost money to maintain and increasing competition from other nurseries, the company began losing money. It filed for bankruptcy and was dissolved in 1927.

When the company closed, the city of Orenco lost its only large employer. Some families started small nurseries of their own, but most moved away looking for work elsewhere. In 1938, eight Orenco residents, representing the community's remaining families, voted to dissolve the city government.

== Products ==
The Oregon Nursery Company had numerous nursery products. Over the years, the company introduced and marketed a number of new varieties of fruits, nuts, and berries. The company sold millions of plants. During one week in 1909, a single Orenco salesman sold over 17,000 prune trees to farmers around in the central Willamette Valley community of Dallas, Oregon.

- The Orenco apple is probably the company's most famous product. The Orenco apple is a red apple, plump, crisp, and juicy with a small core. According to the company's 1913 Descriptive Catalogue of Fruit and Ornamental Trees, the Orenco apple is "the ideal dessert apple." The catalog claimed the Orenco was better than the McIntosh Red apple or Spitzenberg apple, two apples that were known for their quality. Today, the Orenco apple can still be found in some Pacific Northwest orchards and nurseries that specialize in classic apple varieties.
- The Oregon Nursery Company was also selected by Luther Burbank to propagate and market his Maynard plum. The Maynard plum variety became well known for its large size and hardiness during storage and shipping.
- The Greengage plum was once the most popular plum in America. It is a very flavorful plum, but is too fragile for shipping over long distances. Today, the original Greengage variety is extremely hard to find. Almost all the remaining trees can be traced back to Oregon Nursery Company stock.
- Walnuts were an imports product as well. The Oregon Nursery Company marketed at least seven different varieties including Vrooman Franquette, Mayette, Mayette Rougue, Parisienne, Praeparturien, Chaberte, and Cluster walnuts.

== Legacy ==
Today, the Orenco town site along with the rest of the Oregon Nursery Company property is part of Hillsboro, a suburb west of Portland. The house Malcolm McDonald built is a local landmark. It is sometimes called the McDonald-Russell House after McDonald, its first owner, and Eugene Russell who lived in the house while operating the Orenco Woods Golf Course in the 1960s. The house is now the House of Ruth, a home for single mothers. Archibald McGill's house, often called the McGill-Pitman House, still exists. It is also well known in the area.

Today, the Orenco place name is widely used in the Hillsboro area. A major development on the old nursery land is called Orenco Station. One of the Hillsboro stops on the MAX Blue Line light-rail is Orenco/Northwest 231st Avenue. According to the Hillsboro Chamber of Commerce and the Orenco Station Business Owners Association, many Hillsboro businesses still use the Orenco name including retail stores, apartments complexes, at least four restaurants, three banks, a number of professional offices, and a real estate company. In addition, the former Orenco Woods Golf Course is built on land once owned by the Oregon Nursery Company. There is also an Orenco Elementary School in the Hillsboro School District.
