= Imbrie Farm =

Historic house in Oregon, United States

- U.S. National Register of Historic Places
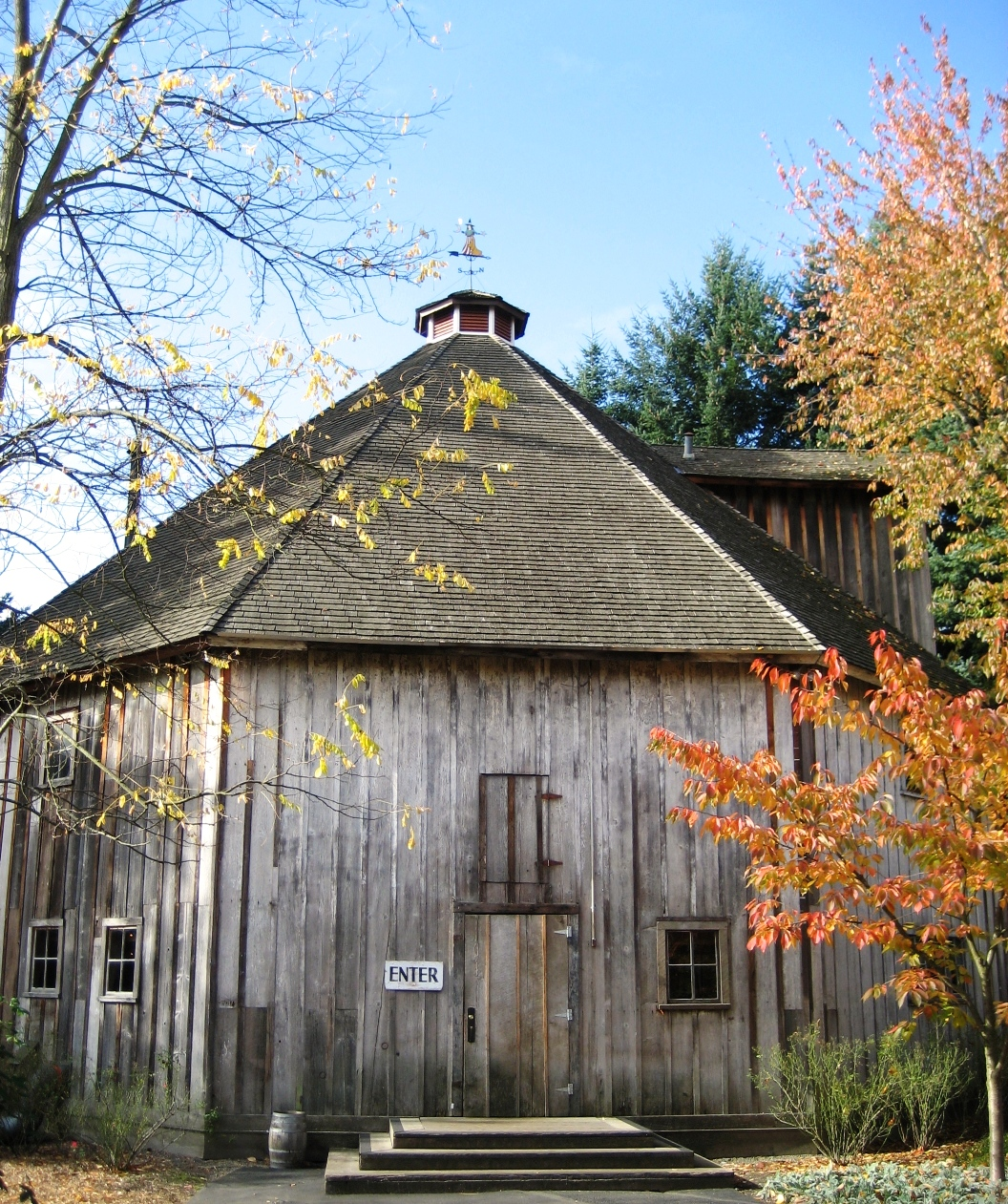
- Octagonal Barn at Imbrie Farm

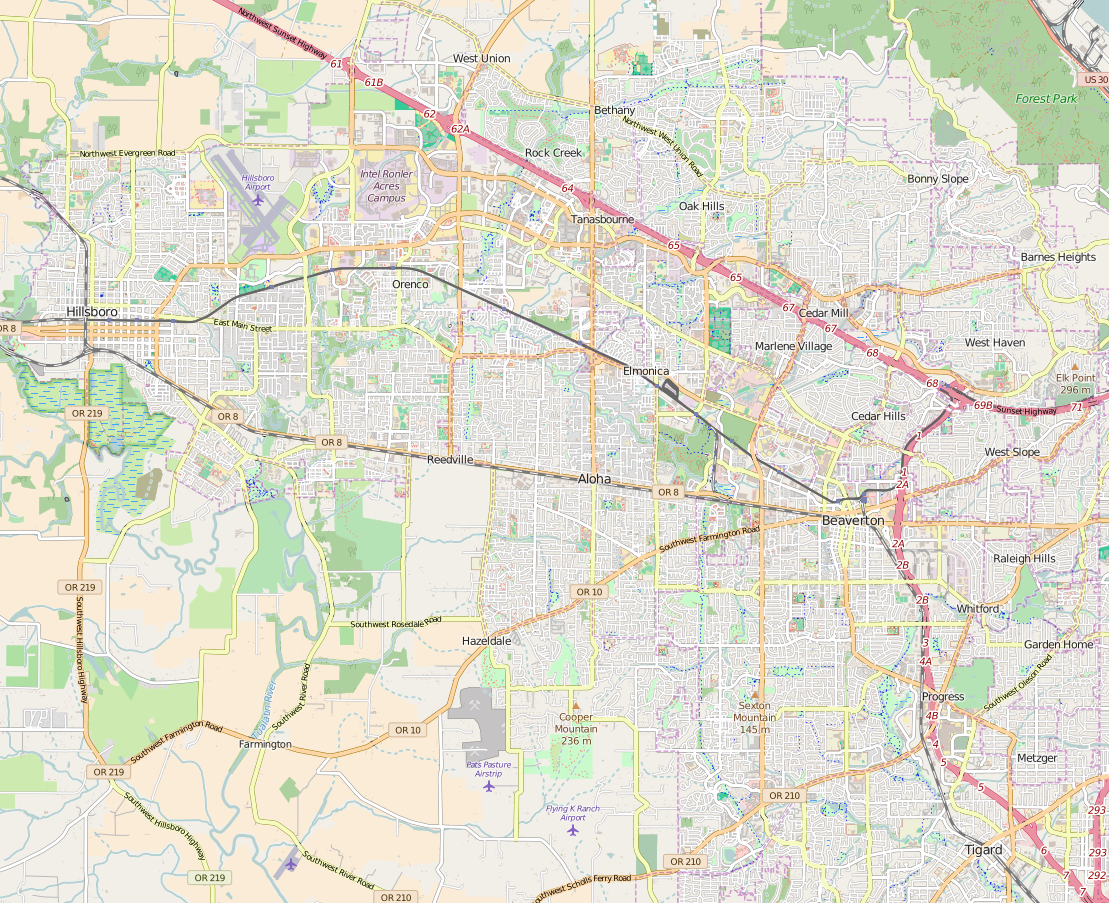
- Location within Hillsboro Beaverton OR
- Location: 4045 NW Cornelius Pass Road, Hillsboro, Oregon 97124
- Coordinates: 45.549475°N 122.901362°W
- Area: 3 acres (1.2 ha)
- Built: 1855
- Architect: Frank Imbrie
- Architectural style: Italian Villa
- NRHP reference No.: 77001117
- Added to NRHP: February 15, 1977

Imbrie Farm is an Italian Villa style home in Hillsboro, Oregon. It was built by Robert Imbrie and was a working farm for over a century. It was added to the National Register of Historic Places in 1977.

Located just south of U.S. Route 26 on Cornelius Pass Road, the estate, as of late 1970s is home to a McMenamins brewpub, the Cornelius Pass Roadhouse. Original structures on the farm include the home, a unique eight-sided barn, and a shed.

== Currently ==
The old farmstead is a brewpub operated by Portland, Oregon based McMenamins. The property contains English chestnut and black walnut trees that have been there for more than 130 years.

== History ==
The Imbrie family arrived in the mid-1840s as part of Oregon's first flood of white settlers. The Imbries came to Oregon from the Midwest, but the family's patriarch, James Imbrie, Jr., was born and raised in the Kingdom of Fife on the southeast coast of Scotland. James' sons, James III and Robert, each developed farms in Washington County. James' area was in North Plains, while brother Robert took over and expanded a neighboring farm (Lenox Farm), where the current buildings are located. Robert immigrated to Oregon via ship around Cape Horn. Robert built a granary in the mid-1850s, then a decade later built the three-story, Italian Villa-style home that still stands today. It took three years beginning in 1866 to complete construction on the home, which they named the Gables. At this point, the family included 12 children and Robert's mother. During this time the family raised Morgans as draft animals to sell to other farmers. Once Robert's son Frank (d. 1945) took over, he turned the farm into a dairy and added the unique eight sided barn around 1900. Later generations of the family lived in the home, adding electricity and indoor plumbing in the 1930s. James Hay, Frank's son, transitioned the farm into grain and hay production, including barley that was used in Blitz-Weinhard beer in the mid-1900s. By the 1970s the family had stopped the agrarian activities, and in 1977 Gary (James, Jr.'s great great grandson) opened the Imbrie Farmstead Restaurant at the old home.

In 1984 the property was purchased by Donald and Billie Jean Herman who continued to operate the restaurant until they leased the operations to McMenamins.

In 1986 current owner McMenamins took over operations (eventually purchasing and restoring the buildings) and turned the property into the Cornelius Pass Roadhouse, a brewpub. McMenamins's Cornelius Pass Roadhouse is located at 4045 NW Cornelius Pass Rd in Hillsboro, OR 97124. The property features a brewery, distillery, outdoor meadows and groves, the historic Octagonal Barn, Imbrie Hall, and the 1866 Italianate Roadhouse. The Roadhouse features original artwork and Victorian-era furnishings, and is often used for large special events.

== Key dates ==
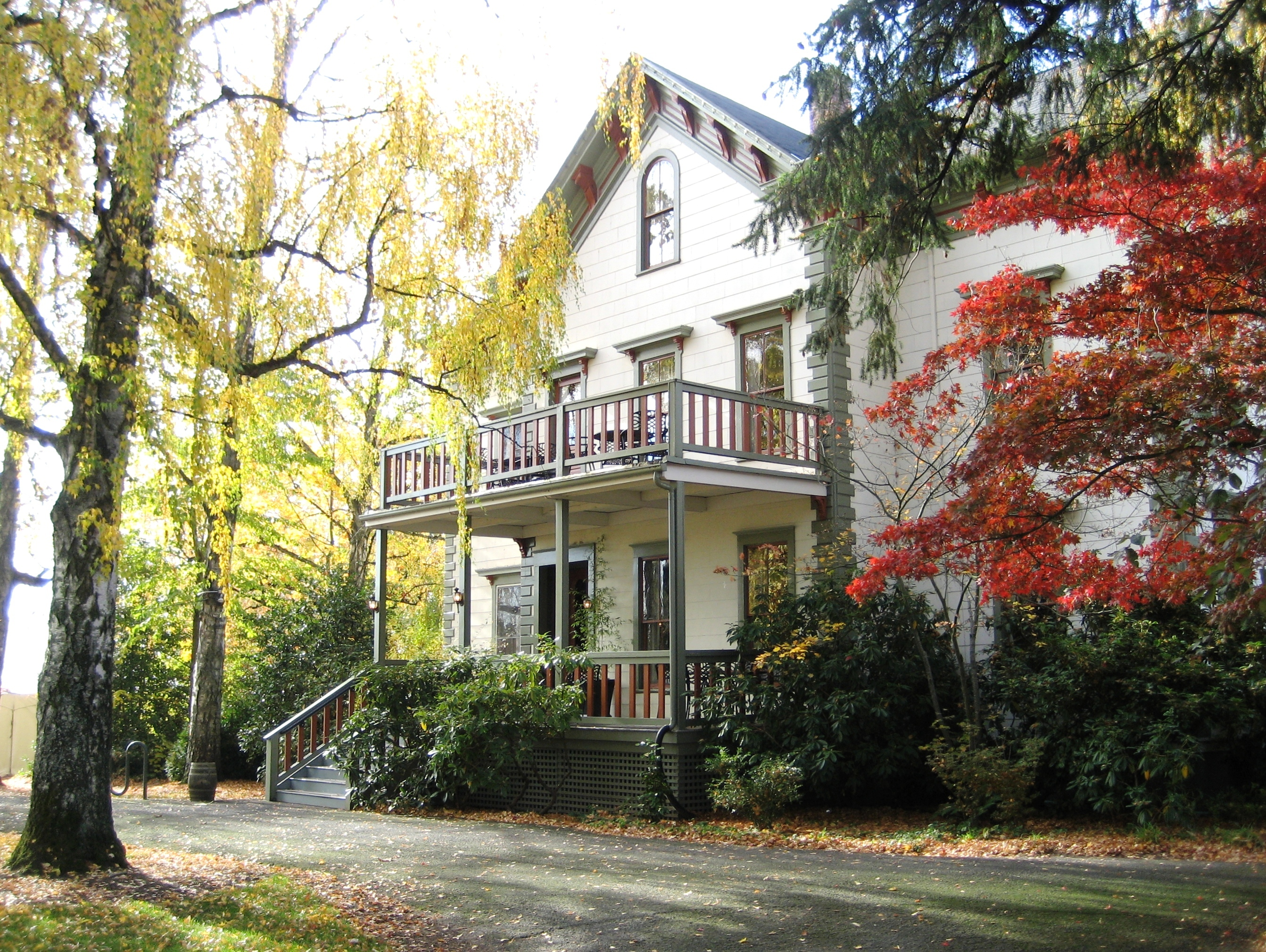
The farmhouse

- 1843: 18-year-old Edward Henry Lenox (from Kentucky) travels over the Oregon Trail and stakes a claim to the present farm site.
- 1850-59: Robert Imbrie acquires the Lenox farm and builds the current granary.
- 1863-66: Robert has the three-story, gabled farm home built.
- 1897: Robert dies.
- 1933: Imbries begin selling barley to Blitz-Weinhard.
- 1945: Frank Imbrie dies.
- 1962: James Hay Imbrie shuts down the family's centennial farm.
- 1968: James Hay dies.
- 1969: James Hay's son, Frank, moves his family onto the old homestead. His children are the sixth and final generation of Imbries to live there.
