= Cornelius Pass Road =

Arterial road in the metro area of Portland, Oregon, United States

Route information
- Maintained by Washington County, ODOT
- Length: 13 mi (21 km)
- Component highways: OR 127 between US 26 and US 30

Major junctions
- South end: SE Deline Street in Hillsboro
- OR 8 in Hillsboro; US 26 in Hillsboro
- North end: US 30 near Portland

Location
- Country: United States
- State: Oregon
- Counties: Washington, Multnomah

Highway system
- Oregon Highways; Interstate; US; State; Named; Scenic
| ← OR 126 | → OR 130 |

Cornelius Pass Road is an arterial road in the Portland metropolitan area of Oregon, United States. The north–south road serves as an arterial connection between U.S. Route 30 (US 30) in Burlington and Southeast Deline Street in Hillsboro. It intersects with several main roads and highways throughout its route, including Oregon Route 10, Oregon Route 8, Cornell Road, and U.S. Route 26 (US 26). Between US 30 and US 26, the road is signed as Oregon Route 127 (OR 127) and named the Cornelius Pass Highway No. 127 (see Oregon highways and routes).

The steeper, hilly northern portion of the road included in OR 127 was built at the end of the 19th century and had its elevation reduced multiple times. Due to development along the southern portion starting in the late 20th century, the road has been subject to several extensions, including in 1996, when it superseded 216th and 219th Avenues in a realignment. Cornelius Pass Road terminated at OR 8/Tualatin Valley Highway until 2016, when the first of several extensions opened due to the development of South Hillsboro.

== Route description ==
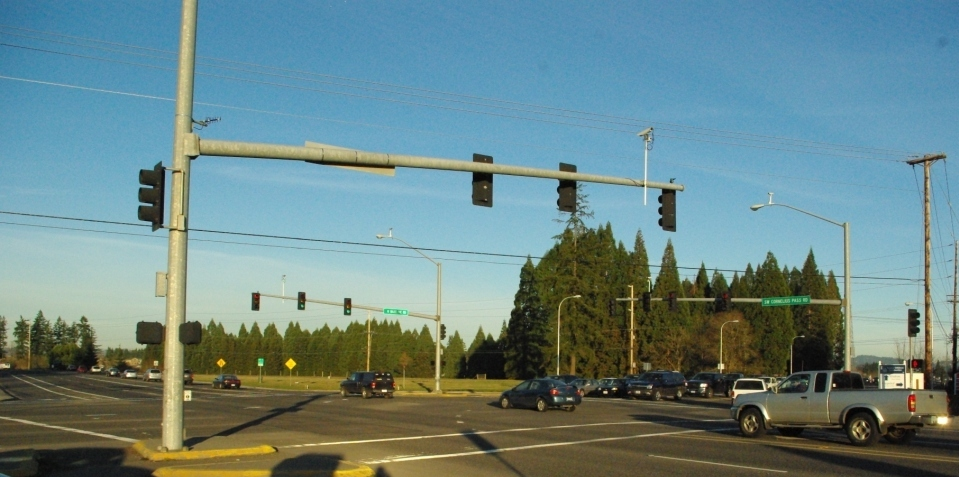
Cornelius Pass at Baseline Road in 2009

Cornelius Pass Road begins at a three-way intersection with Southeast Deline Street in southern Hillsboro. It travels north across the bridge over Butternut Creek and Reed's Crossing towards a set of railroad tracks that are owned by Portland and Western Railroad and intersects OR 8 (concurrent with Tualatin Valley Highway) before continuing into Hillsboro's suburban neighborhoods. The street passes under a viaduct carrying light rail trains on the MAX Blue and Red Lines near Quatama station and the Orenco Woods Nature Park.

From the undercrossing, the highway travels through several business parks on the east side of Intel's Ronler Acres factory, connected by the intersecting Cornell Road and Evergreen Parkway. Cornelius Pass Road then reaches an interchange with U.S. Route 26 (the Sunset Highway) and turns northeast as it leaves Hillsboro. The highway winds its way around farms and forestland as it ascends into the Tualatin Mountains, reaching its highest point at Cornelius Pass, elevation 581 feet (177 m). The narrow road then descends from the mountains along McCarthy Creek and approaches the Multnomah Channel of the Columbia River, terminating at an intersection with U.S. Route 30 northwest of Portland.

Traffic volume on Cornelius Pass Road in Washington County
| Location | Volume | | | |
| Location | 2010 | 2014 | 2018 | 2023 |
|---|---|---|---|---|
| Near TV Highway | 16,294 | 15,347 | 17,000 | 14,573 |
| Near Baseline Road | 18,208 | 25,674 | 28,435 | 24,478 |
| Near Quatama Road | 24,338 | 25,674 | 31,910 | 28,760 |
| Near Cornell Road | 26,542 | 28,761 | 38,762 | 33,579 |
| Near Imbrie Drive | 38,860 | 43,346 | no data | 46,448 |
| Near West Union Road | 17,947 | 20,417 | 26,156 | 22,112 |
| Near Germantown Road | 8,103 | 9,777 | 16,431 | 8,553 |
Volume: Daily traffic (Tuesday, Wednesday, or Thursday); Source: 2010 2014 2018 2023

Cornelius Pass is one of only two main north–south connecting roads in Hillsboro. By 2006, the former country road handled 11,000 drivers each day, though it was designed for 10,000, because it is an arterial route from the Tualatin Valley between Hillsboro to the Columbia River north of Portland; 1,500 of the 11,000 vehicles were tractor-trailers.

The section between US 26 and US 30 is signed as Oregon Route 127 (OR 127) and maintained by the Oregon Department of Transportation (ODOT). A portion of the road, from US 26 to Cornell, is part of the National Highway System.

== History ==
The eastbound exit for Cornelius Pass Road on the Sunset Highway (US 26)

Cornelius Pass Road was originally built by Thomas R. Cornelius around 1870.This version of the road began on Germantown Road, while Germantown Road continued westward to Helvetia Road. The road was straightened and reduced in elevation in 1916. In 1928, the road was reconstructed and had its elevation reduced further in a joint project between Multnomah and Washington counties. (Note: Washington County's share of the project was estimated to be approximately $50,000, while Multnomah County's was estimated to be less than $9,000.) The next year, a petition started by the Linnton Community Club resulted in an extension of the road to US 30 to connect with the then-new St. Johns Bridge.

In 1948, 1951, and 1956, mudslides caused by rainy weather resulted in multiple obstructions of the road and temporary one-way traffic being put into effect. In 1976, another obstruction caused by winter weather blocked the road near its interchange with US 30.

The interchange with the Sunset Highway (US 26) was rebuilt and widened in 1989, and the road was widened to five lanes from the freeway to Cornell Road the following year. In 1996, the road was finally extended southward when 216th and 219th Avenues were renamed and became the southern section of the road, terminating at Tualatin Valley Highway, discussions for which started as early as 1969. At that time, the intersection with Baseline Road was re-aligned. Also in 1996, Intel opened its Ronler Acres plant on land near Cornelius Pass Road; Intel has since funded road improvements in the area, including a road connecting Cornelius Pass Road to the Ronler Acres campus.

The intersection with US 26 was altered in 2005 with new on- and off-ramps extending from Cornelius Pass to the east, where a railroad overpass had previously been located; Intel contributed funding for this project. In 2008, the entire Multnomah County section was changed to a no-passing zone on the winding road over the Tualatin Mountains.

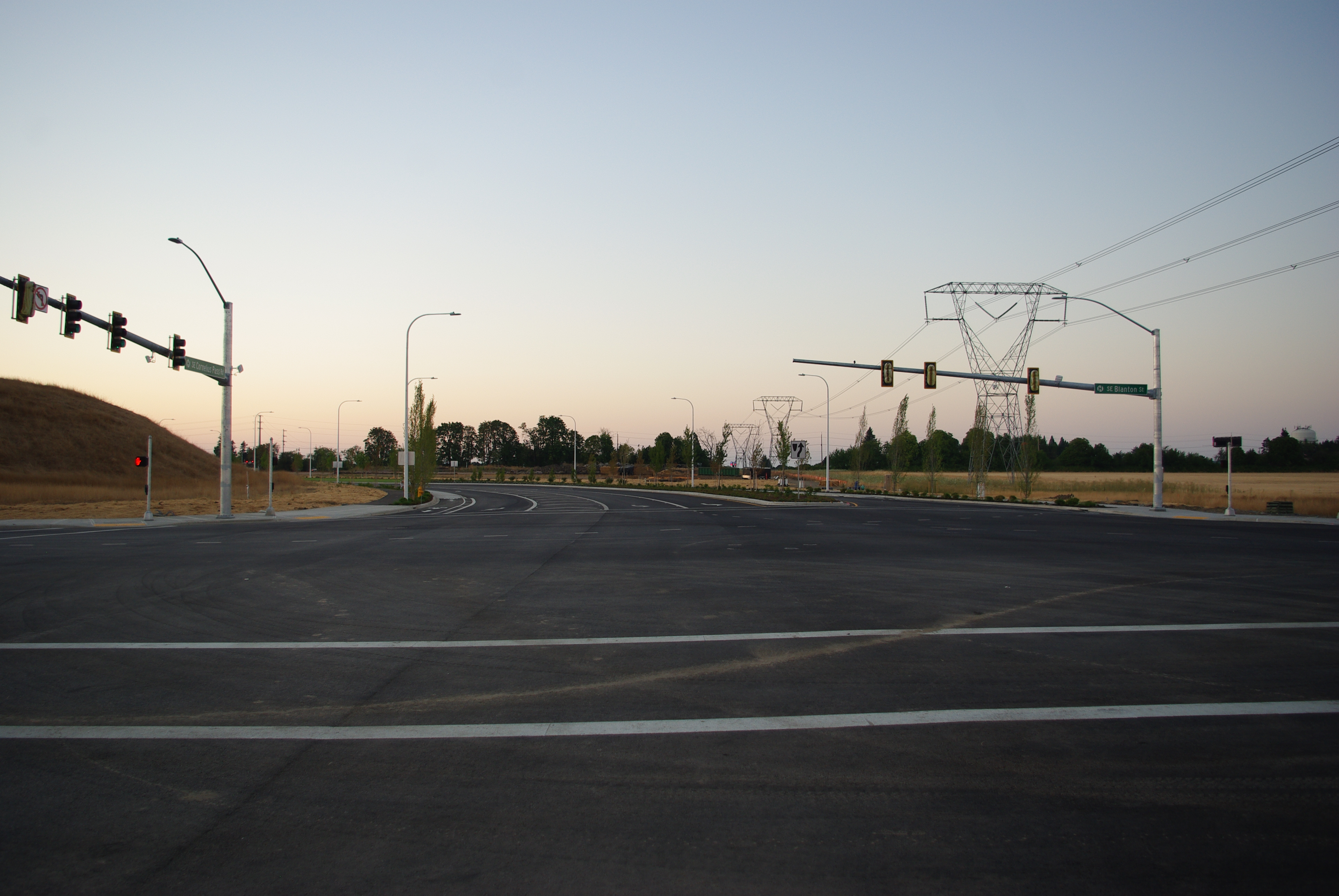
Looking north on Cornelius Pass Road from Blanton Street, July 2018

A one-mile section from Lois to Wilkins streets closed for eight months in 2010 in order to widen the road in that area to five lanes as well as add bike lanes and sidewalks. The $12 million project included a new 182-foot (55 m) bridge over Beaverton Creek. Washington County hoped to widen the remaining portion of the road to five lanes between Walbridge/Aloclek and Wilkins. Announced in 2011, the expected cost was $10.1 million and would include a new bridge over Rock Creek. Construction closed the section for six months, with the new bridge opening on December 31, 2012; at that time, the remaining widening was expected to continue until the middle of 2013.

Hillsboro also began preliminary work in 2011 to extend Cornelius Pass south of Tualatin Valley Highway to prepare for the development of South Hillsboro. The Oregon Legislature approved $9.5 million in 2012 to fund safety improvements such as guardrails. Hillsboro also announced plans in 2012 to widen the road to seven lanes between Cornell and US 26. The widening project was completed in March 2017 at a total cost of $18.3 million.

Construction began in 2016 on the extension of Cornelius Pass Road south of Tualatin Valley Highway. The extension, approximately one-third mile (540 m) long, was opened to traffic in July 2018. The new section crosses Portland & Western Railroad tracks and takes Cornelius Pass Road into the under-construction South Hillsboro area.

As of July 2017, NW and SW Cornelius Pass Roads were renamed to NE and SE Cornelius Pass Roads between TV Highway and NW West Union Road.

In July 2019, a five-mile (8.0 km) stretch of Cornelius Pass Road between US 30 and NW Germantown Road began an 11-week closure. This stretch of road had experienced a high rate of crashes in preceding years, and Multnomah County closed the road so that safety improvements could be carried out, including curve realignment and widening of shoulders.

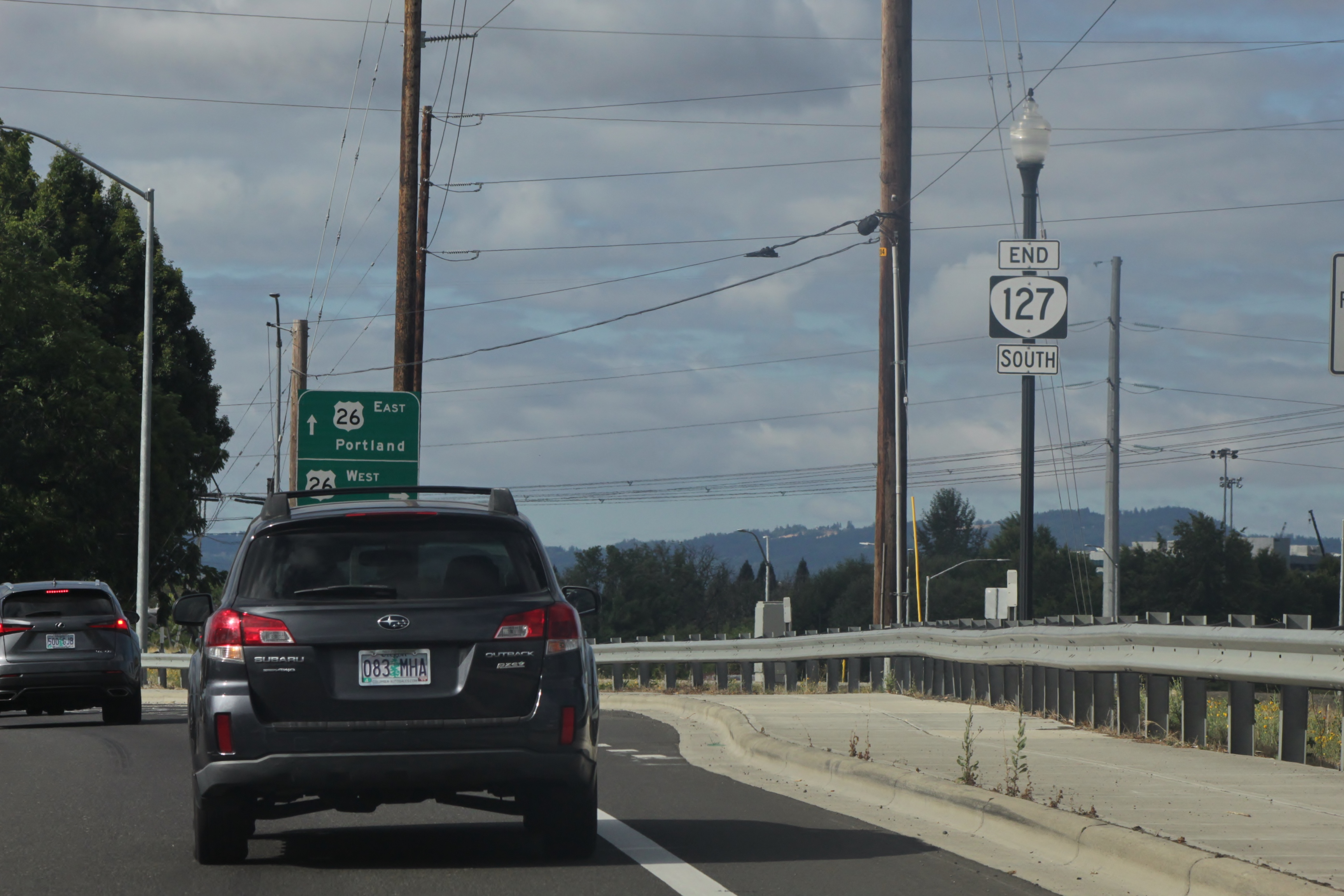
Southern terminus of OR 127, as seen in 2021

On February 16, 2021, the Washington County Board of Commissioners approved the reallocation of $8 million, previously reserved for a bridge replacement project on nearby Century Boulevard, to partially fund the construction of a 5-lane bridge carrying Cornelius Pass over Butternut Creek. This $14.1 million project further extends the road south from its current terminus and allows further extensions southward toward Farmington Road to proceed. Construction on the single-span concrete bridge commenced in April 2023 and was completed in September 2024. A pedestrian bridge is to be suspended underneath. Work continued on an extension of the road to a newly built intersection with Kinnaman Road through 2021.

The section of the road between US 26 and US 30 was transferred to the Oregon Department of Transportation on March 1, 2021, becoming Oregon Route 127. The transfer had been approved by the state legislature in 2017 as part of House Bill 2017 but was delayed due to an upgrade of the road to state highway standards.

A $29.5 million project, started in March 2022 and completed in 2023, widened the road from three to five lanes between Frances Street and Tualatin Valley Highway, alongside installing a 45-inch drinking water pipeline beneath the road.

== Major intersections ==
| County | Location | mi | km | Destinations | Notes |
|---|---|---|---|---|---|
| Washington | Hillsboro | 0.0 | 0.0 | Southeast Deline Street | |
| Washington | Hillsboro | 0.7 | 1.1 | Southeast Kinnaman Street | |
| Washington | Hillsboro | 1.4 | 2.3 | OR 8 (TV Highway) – Forest Grove, Beaverton | |
| Washington | Hillsboro | 2.9 | 4.7 | Cornell Road | |
| Washington | Hillsboro | 4.0 | 6.4 | US 26 – Seaside, Portland | Interchange; southern terminus of OR 127 |
| Multnomah | | 13.0 | 20.9 | US 30 (St. Helens Road) – Scappoose, St. Helens, Portland | Northern terminus of OR 127 |
1.000 mi = 1.609 km; 1.000 km = 0.621 mi

== See also ==
- Imbrie Farm
