= Orenco Woods Nature Park =

Park in Hillsboro

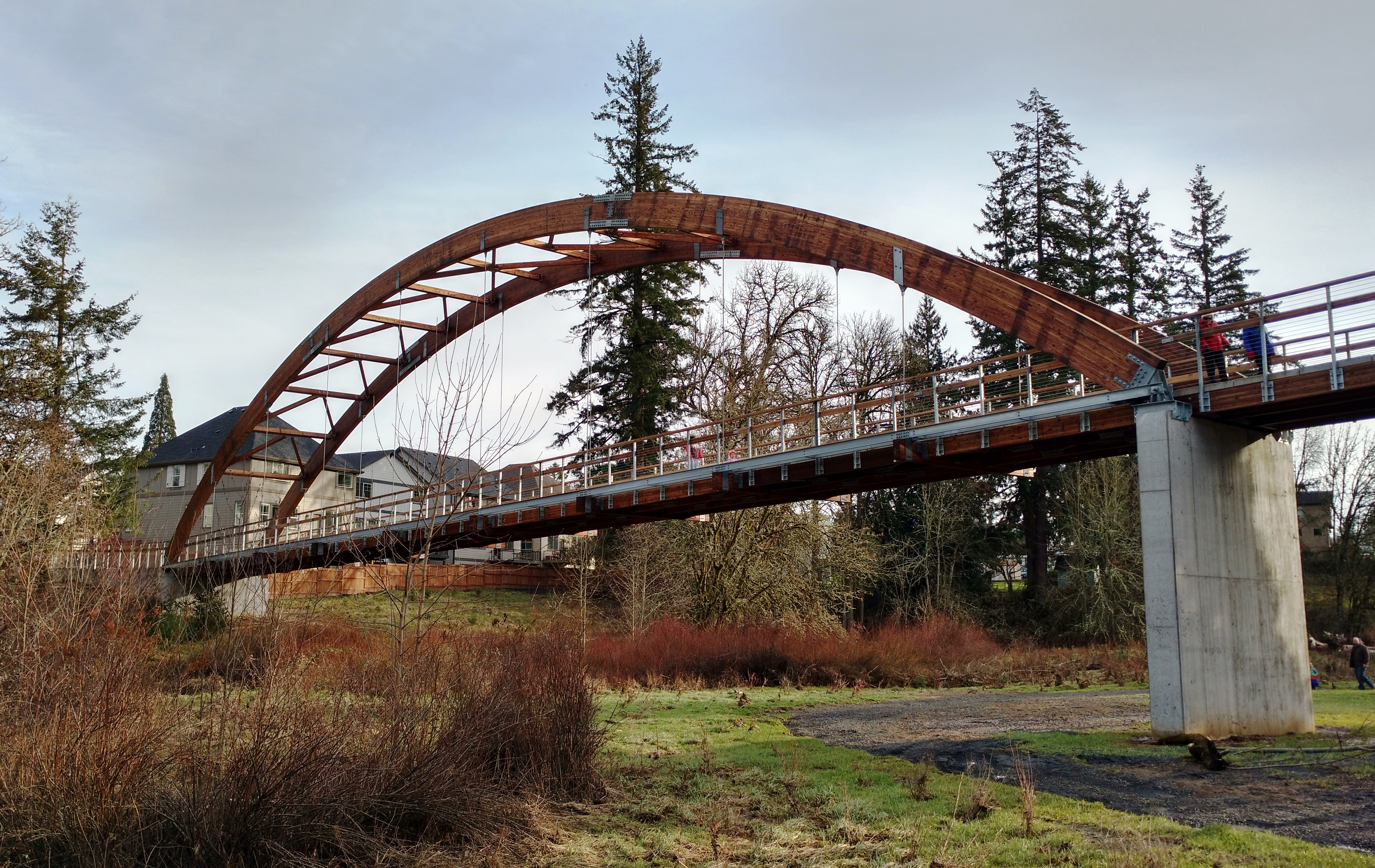
- Arch bridge over Rock Creek, 2017
- Interactive map of Orenco Woods Nature Park
- Type: Public, city
- Location: Hillsboro, Oregon, United States
- Coordinates: 45.526°N 122.9024°W
- Area: 42 acres (17 ha)
- Opened: February 4, 2017; 9 years ago
- Operator: Hillsboro Parks & Recreation Department
- Status: Open
- Website: www.hillsboro-oregon.gov/Home/Components/FacilityDirectory/FacilityDirectory/92/3979

Orenco Woods Nature Park is a park located in Hillsboro, Oregon, United States. The site was formerly nine-hole Orenco Woods Golf Course in the Orenco neighborhood owned by the Hillsboro Elks. The eastern edge is bounded by Cornelius Pass Road and the tracks for the MAX Blue Line form the northern boundary. Rock Creek flows through the 42-acre (17 ha) site between Orchard Park upstream and Noble Woods Park downstream, with the Rock Creek Trail planned to connect all three parks.

== History ==
The nine-hole Orenco Woods Golf Course was purchased by Venture Properties in 2007. The company planned to build more than 280 homes on the 40-acre site, but the project never came to fruition due to the Great Recession and the efforts of local residents. The city had designated Orenco Woods as "open space," but Hillsboro leaders re-zoned the land for development of 252 single-family homes at the request of developer Venture Properties in 2005.

Some Orenco neighborhood residents unsuccessfully protested the change, Hillsboro resident Jim Lubischer is credited with spearheading the effort to ensure a public park was included. Noting a rapidly diminishing supply of suitable land and Hillsboro's own Parks & Trails Master Plan including targets not being met, Lubischer took the appeal to include park space to court in repeated failed attempts, including to the Oregon Supreme Court. During these appeals, the downturned economy led Venture to abandon its original plan. A request to include commercial properties was denied by the city in 2008, and the property was eventually foreclosed by U.S. Bank. Local realtor Dirk Knudsen then worked for two years to get a call back from the bank in order to determine the broker charged with selling the property before a sale was opened to new housing developers. Once he was able to locate the broker, Knudsen successfully built a coalition to raise funding for a public park and negotiate with the bank.

The City of Hillsboro and Metro purchased the land in 2011 for $4 million. The city sold 9.7 acres (3.9 ha) at the southeast corner to home builder Polygon Northwest Company in January 2013. The proceeds from $3.4 million deal were planned to be used to develop the park. Metro approved the master plan for the park in November 2013. The park opened on February 4, 2017.

== Amenities ==
The park has 42 acres (17 ha), mostly devoted to open space. Orenco Woods includes public restrooms, a picnic shelter, trails, bridges, and a nature-themed play area. The National Register of Historic Places-listed Malcolm McDonald House is also located within the park.

== See also ==
- Cooper Mountain Nature Park
- Oregon Nursery Company
- Tualatin Hills Nature Park
