= Orenco Station, Hillsboro, Oregon =

Orenco Station
- Neighborhood
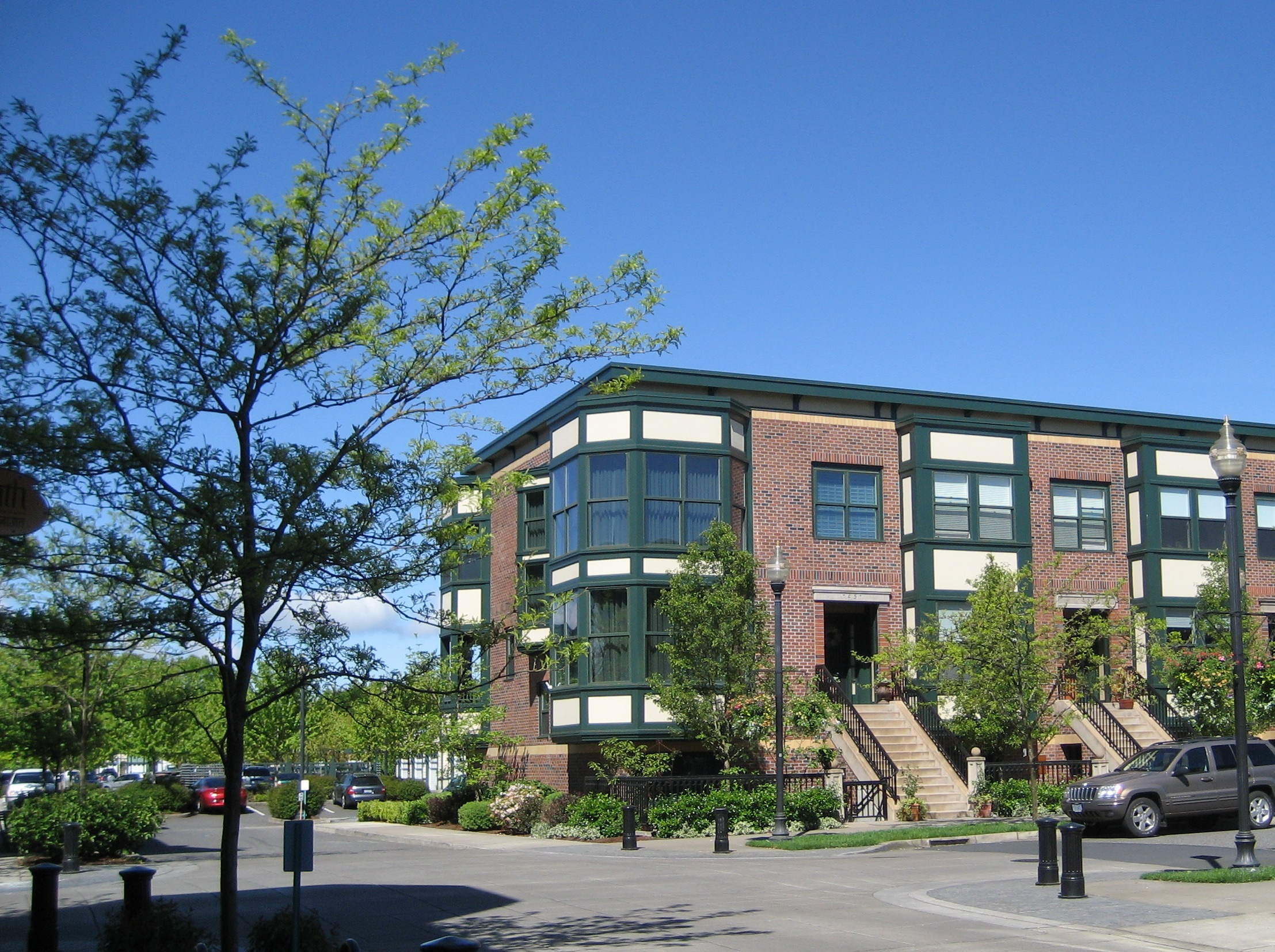
- Brownstone residential dwelling
- Etymology: Orenco
- Interactive map of Orenco Station
- Coordinates: 45°31′50″N 122°55′00″W
- Country: United States
- State: Oregon
- Region: Washington County
- District: Hillsboro
- Time zone: Pacific
- Postal code: 97124

Orenco Station is a neighborhood of the city of Hillsboro, Oregon, United States. The planned urban town center was designed as a pedestrian-friendly, high-density community built in conjunction with TriMet’s Westside light rail. It was built on land formerly owned by the Oregon Nursery Company, land home around the turn of the 20th century to Orenco, a company town. During the Great Depression, the company went out of business, and much of the nursery land became vacant until re-development began in 1997. Orenco Station is near the intersection of NE Century Blvd. (formerly NW 231st/NW 229th Avenues) and Cornell Road, centered on the Orenco MAX Station.

== History ==
Much of what is now Orenco Station was intended to be the suburban development of Ronler Acres. Platted from 1959 to 1960, this project would see little residential development due to difficulties accessing services, but it's land would be bought by hundreds. By 1994, most of this land would be owned by Hillsboro and PacTrust, and the land was mostly vacated.

The town of Orenco was named after the company, with OREgon Nursery COmpany becoming ORENCO. After the company closed, the town disincorporated in 1938. In 1993, construction on TriMet’s extension to its MAX Light Rail system began, and planning for new high-density neighborhoods along the line continued, including plans for Orenco Station. The area near the old town of Orenco was labeled a “Town Center” by Metro in its 2040 plan for the region.

== Features ==
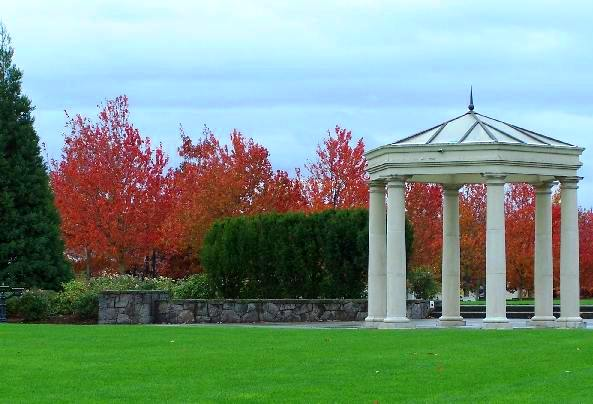
Central Park

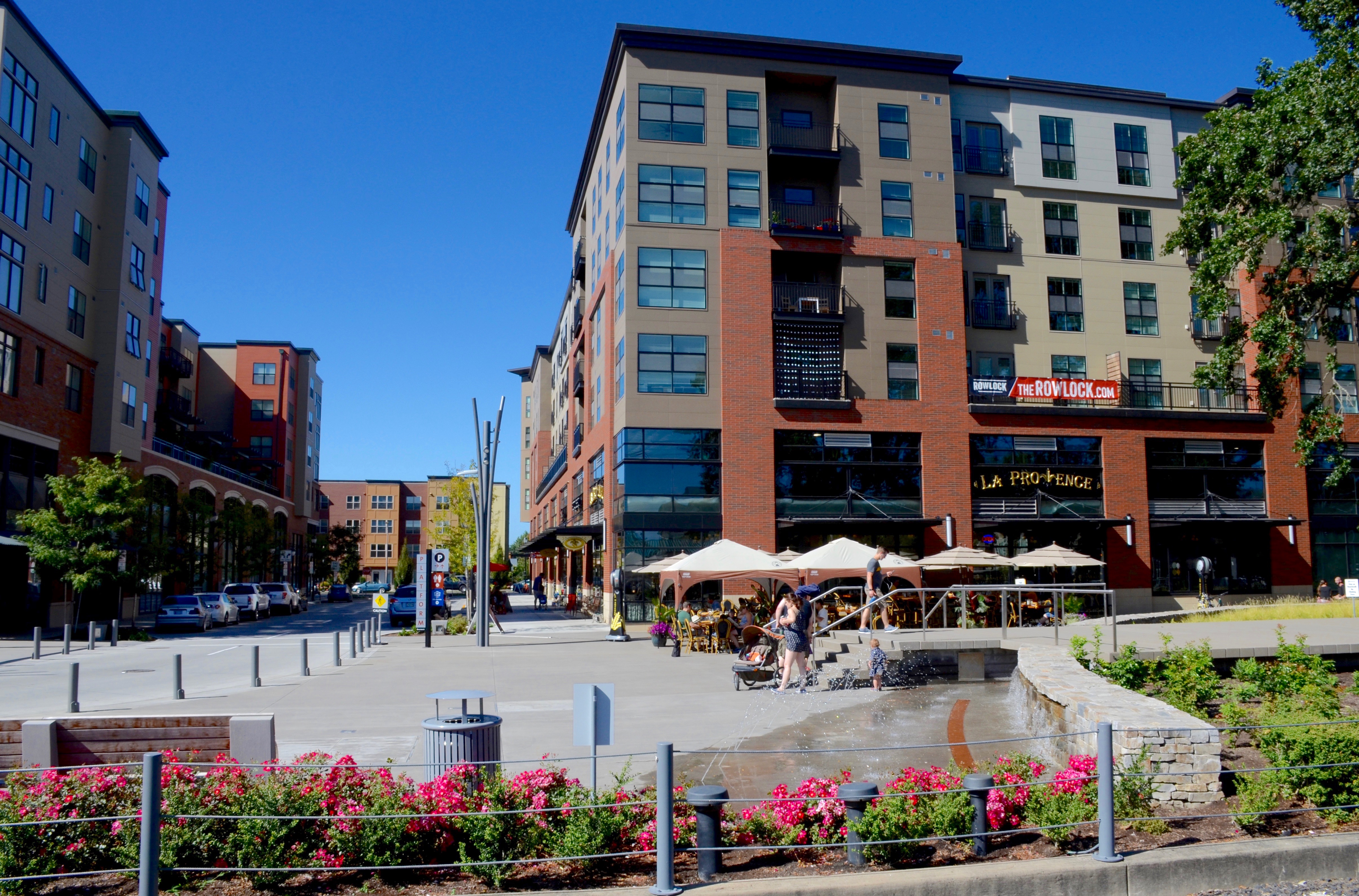
Construction in 2014 and later has included buildings as tall as six stories in the area closest to the MAX station.

Orenco Station was developed on 209 acres (0.85 km^{2}) in the east-central area of Hillsboro. The master developer, Pacific Realty Associates (PacTrust), along with its residential partner Costa Pacific Homes, designed it to mimic older neighborhoods and be more pedestrian-friendly than traditional suburbs. Zoning ordinances were changed to allow narrower streets, side-yard easements, garages on alleys, and measures to allow live-work homes, among other changes. The development was a mixed-used neighborhood combining both retail and residential along the light rail line and in the middle of high-tech employers. Residential options include apartments, single-family dwellings, condominiums, and town homes. Orenco Station also contains a large park named Central Park located just north of the retail core, along with smaller parks spread throughout the development as a trade-off for smaller yards created by the smaller lot sizes in the development. Homes in the development are situated closer to the street than in traditional developments, and all were built with Category 5 cable installed in the dwellings.

During late spring through summer Orenco Station is host to a farmers' market, featuring produce, crafts, and music.

== Significance ==
Orenco Station is a case study of transit-oriented and New Urbanist development in a suburban context. Bruce Podobnik, a sociologist at Lewis and Clark College, completed a study in 2002 that showed comparatively high levels of resident satisfaction and "social capital", or interaction between neighbors. Transit use was also relatively high in the study—22% for commuting, versus about 6% in the region overall. Use of other modes of transportation such as walking and bicycle were also relatively high. Governing executive editor Alan Ehrenhalt called Orenco Station "perhaps the most interesting experiment in New Urbanist planning anywhere in the country."

The development has won awards such as “Best New Burb” by Sunset magazine in 2005. Other awards include the Oregon Governor's Livability Award in 1998, the Best Masterplanned Community in America Award by the National Association of Home Builders in 1998, the Ahwahnee Award in 1999, and Transit Communities Livable Design Award awarded by AIA/ULI/FTA/STPP in 1999.

A new 57-unit apartment building that opened on June 29, 2015, is reported to be the largest passive-house apartment building in North America. The building is the first of three phases of a complex named "the Orchards at Orenco Station", on which construction began in June 2014. Construction of the second phase is expected to begin in July 2015.

== See also ==
- Cornell Creek Park
