= Orenco station (TriMet) =

Light rail station in Hillsboro, Oregon, United States

Orenco
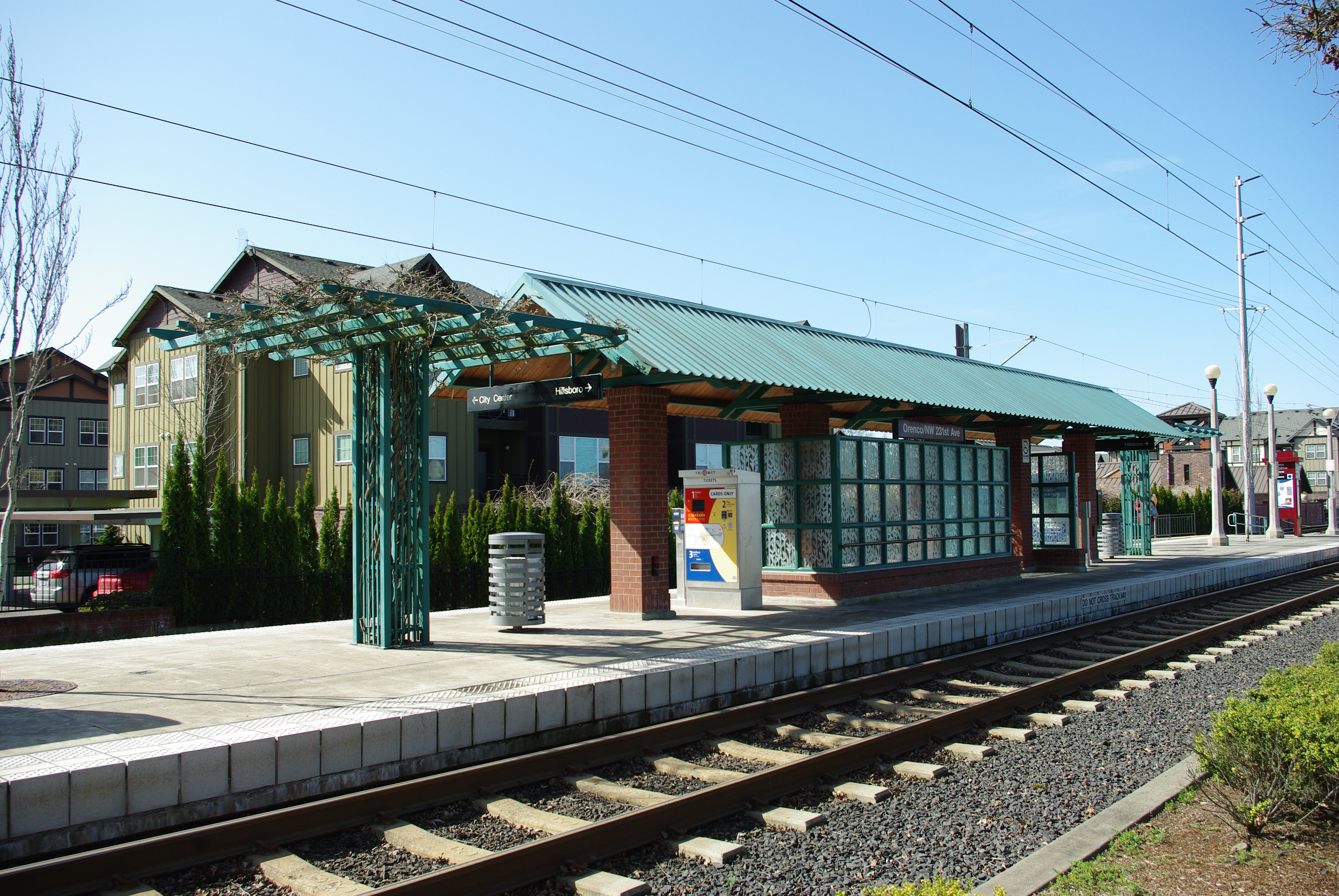
- The platform of then-named Orenco/Northwest 231st Avenue station in 2010

General information
- Location: NE Orenco Station Loop; Hillsboro, Oregon, U.S.
- Coordinates: 45°31′49″N 122°54′57″W
- Owner: TriMet
- Platforms: 1 island platform
- Tracks: 2
- Connections: TriMet: 47; Ride Connection: North Hillsboro Link

Construction
- Structure type: At-grade
- Parking: 125 spaces
- Cycle facilities: Bike and ride and racks
- Accessible: Yes

History
- Opened: September 12, 1998
- Former names: Orenco/NW 231st Ave (1998–2017)

Passengers
- Fall 2024: 918 weekday boardings

Services
Preceding station	TriMet	Following station
Hawthorn Farm toward Hatfield Government Center	Blue Line	Quatama toward Cleveland Ave
Hawthorn Farm toward Hillsboro Airport/Fairgrounds	Red Line	Quatama toward Portland Airport
Location

Orenco station, formerly Orenco/NW 231st Ave station, is a light rail station in Hillsboro, Oregon, United States, served by TriMet as part of MAX Light Rail. Situated between the Quatama and Hawthorn Farm stations, it is the seventh eastbound station on the Blue Line and the third on the Red Line. The station serves the Orenco Station neighborhood, a widely recognized model for transit-oriented development. It includes a 125-space park and ride, a 52-space bike and ride, and connections with TriMet bus route 47–Main/Baseline and Ride Connection's North Hillsboro Link.

An Oregon Electric Railway (OE) depot of the same name served the area in the early 20th century. The TriMet station was built as part of the Westside MAX project, which extended MAX from downtown Portland to Hillsboro in 1998. In 2017, TriMet simplified the station's name to Orenco station after the city renamed Northwest 231st Avenue to Northeast Century Boulevard.

== History ==
=== Background ===
Historic Orenco was a company town founded in 1906 by Malcolm McDonald and Archibald McGill of the Oregon Nursery Company, who purchased 1,200 acres (485.6 ha) and relocated the company from Salem. The town's name was derived from the nursery company's name, forming the portmanteau "Orenco". In 1908, OE began operating its Forest Grove branch, with a depot serving Orenco on Northeast Alder Street between the 67th and 68th avenues, just east of the present-day light rail station. The nursery had persuaded the railway to route its tracks through the town rather than along a more southerly alignment. By 1913, the year Orenco incorporated, the depot recorded an average of 1,000 passengers per month.

The outbreak of World War I in 1914 disrupted the nursery's plans for expansion into Europe. After several years of financial difficulties, the company filed for bankruptcy and closed in 1927. Following the loss of the town's largest employer, many residents moved away. In 1932, OE's Forest Grove line ceased operating due to the Great Depression and competition from automobiles. The local government was dissolved in 1938.

The former townsite and its surrounding area remained largely rural for several decades and later became a site for illegal dumping. During the 1950s, much of the area was subdivided and sold to development ventures, many of which did not succeed. In 1983, the Hillsboro city government began planning for annexation and established an urban renewal district to consolidated land ownership. Land was subsequently sold to Intel and Pacific Realty Associates, the latter of which later developed Orenco Station, a transit-oriented, mixed-use community.

=== Westside MAX extension ===
Planning for a westward extension of the Metropolitan Area Express (MAX) from Portland to Hillsboro began in 1979, with initial proposals terminating the line at 185th Avenue, east of the former Orenco townsite. Lobbying by Hillsboro Mayor Shirley Huffman and others helped secure a 6.2-mile (10.0 km) extension further west through Orenco to downtown Hillsboro. The Hillsboro extension was estimated to cost $224 million and required an additional $75 million in federal funding, which was approved in 1994.

The regional transit agency TriMet began construction of the Westside MAX in August 1993. Track work reached the section between 12th Avenue and 185th Avenue in Hillsboro, which included Orenco, in April 1996. The line was initially scheduled to open from Portland to 185th Avenue in 1997 and to Hillsboro in 1998. However, construction delays involving the Robertson Tunnel postponed most of the line's opening back by one year. The station opened on September 12, 1998, as Orenco/Northwest 231st Avenue station.

In September 2017, the station was renamed from Orenco/NW 231st Ave station to Orenco station in connection with street-name changes approved by the Hillsboro City Council in October 2016. The changes included renaming Northwest 231st Avenue within Hillsboro to Northeast Century Boulevard. On August 25, 2024, the Red Line began serving the station concurrent with its extension to Hillsboro Airport/Fairgrounds station.

=== Transit-oriented development ===
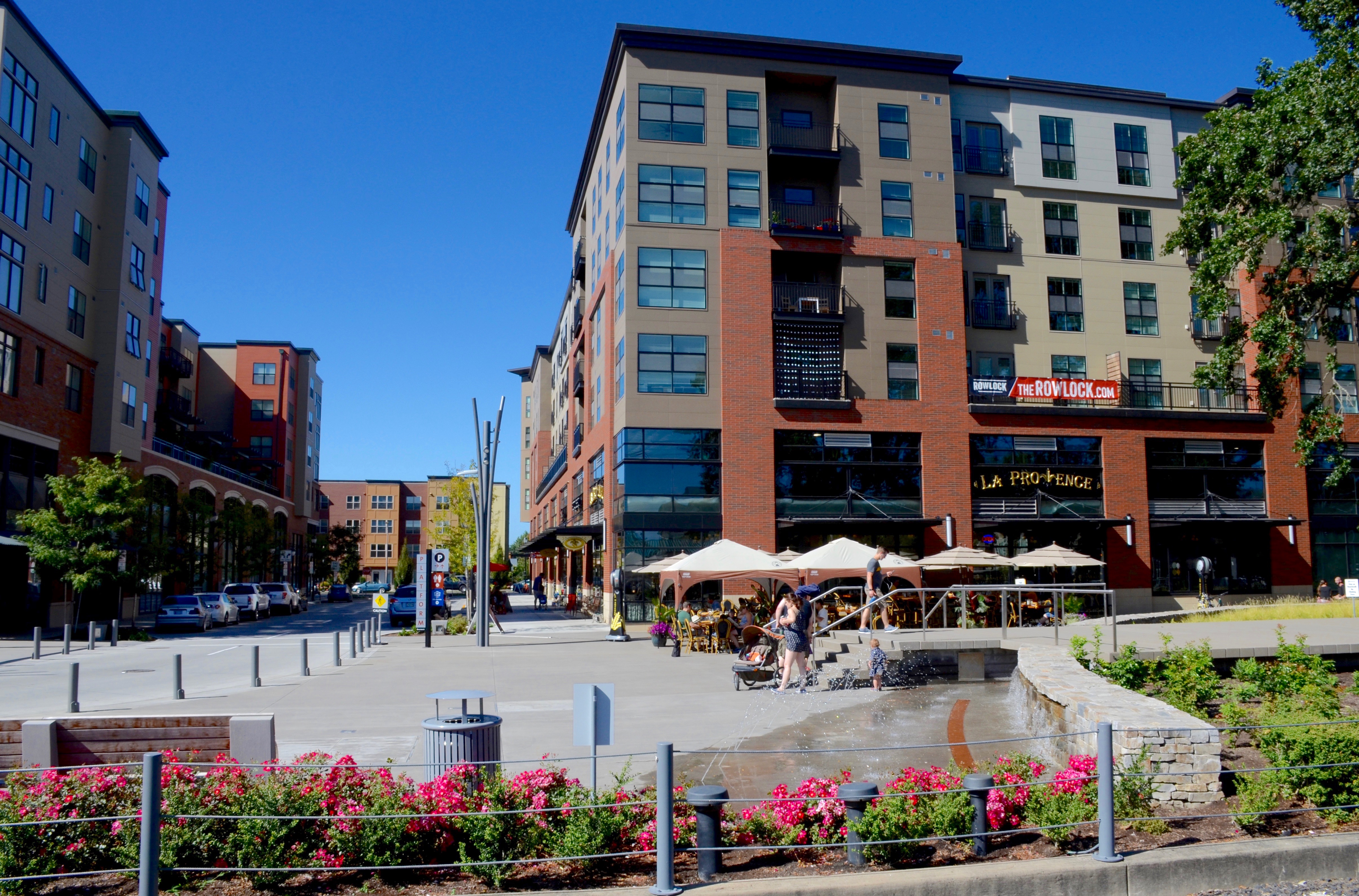
Apartments in the Platform District in 2016

During the light rail station's early planning stages, the City of Hillsboro and TriMet imposed high-density development restrictions despite the opposition of nearby residents. In April 1994, Hillsboro approved an interim ordinance that detailed planning standards for the area within 0.5 miles (0.8 km) of the station and set a population density goal of 45 residents per acre. The Orenco Neighborhood Association challenged the ordinance in the Oregon Court of Appeals but the court ruled in favor of the city in July 1995. Two months after, a compromise was reached to allow granny-flat homes in the zoning plans, lowering the initial density target to 34.5 residents per acre.

Pacific Reality Associates, which acquired 190 acres (76.9 ha) near the station, developed much of the Orenco Station neighborhood. In the late 1990s, the developer built 450 homes on lots averaging 4,000 square feet (372 m^{2}), about twenty percent smaller than a typical lot at the time, with floor plans that averaged 1,700 square feet (158 m^{2}). It also built 1,400 apartments, retail stores, and offices.

The area immediately north of the station, among the last parcels of land to be filled, was approved for development in 2013. The $120 million Platform District, developed by Holland Partners Group, features three six-story, mixed-use buildings that include more than 1,000 housing units and 20,000 square feet (1,858 m^{2}) of retail space. The first of the three buildings, called "The Hub", was completed in February 2015. At the district's center is Plaza Park, a 0.5-acre (0.2 ha) urban plaza that consists of a water feature, a colorful pergola, and a raised deck built around two white oak trees. The plaza is designed to host outdoor public events.

== Station details ==
Orenco station is located south of Northeast Cornell Road and west of Northeast Century Boulevard adjacent to Northeast Orenco Station Loop. The station serves the Orenco Station neighborhood. It was within TriMet's fare zone 3 until the agency discontinued all use of fare zones in 2012. Designed by OTAK Inc., Orenco station features an island platform with a shelter, ticket vending machines, and a passenger information display. There is a 24-hour park and ride with 125 spaces nearby, as well as a 50-space bike-and-ride facility operated by BikeLink. Between the station and Northeast Cherry Drive is Plaza Park, a public plaza bounded by mid-rise, mixed-use buildings that collectively make up the Platform District.

=== Public art ===
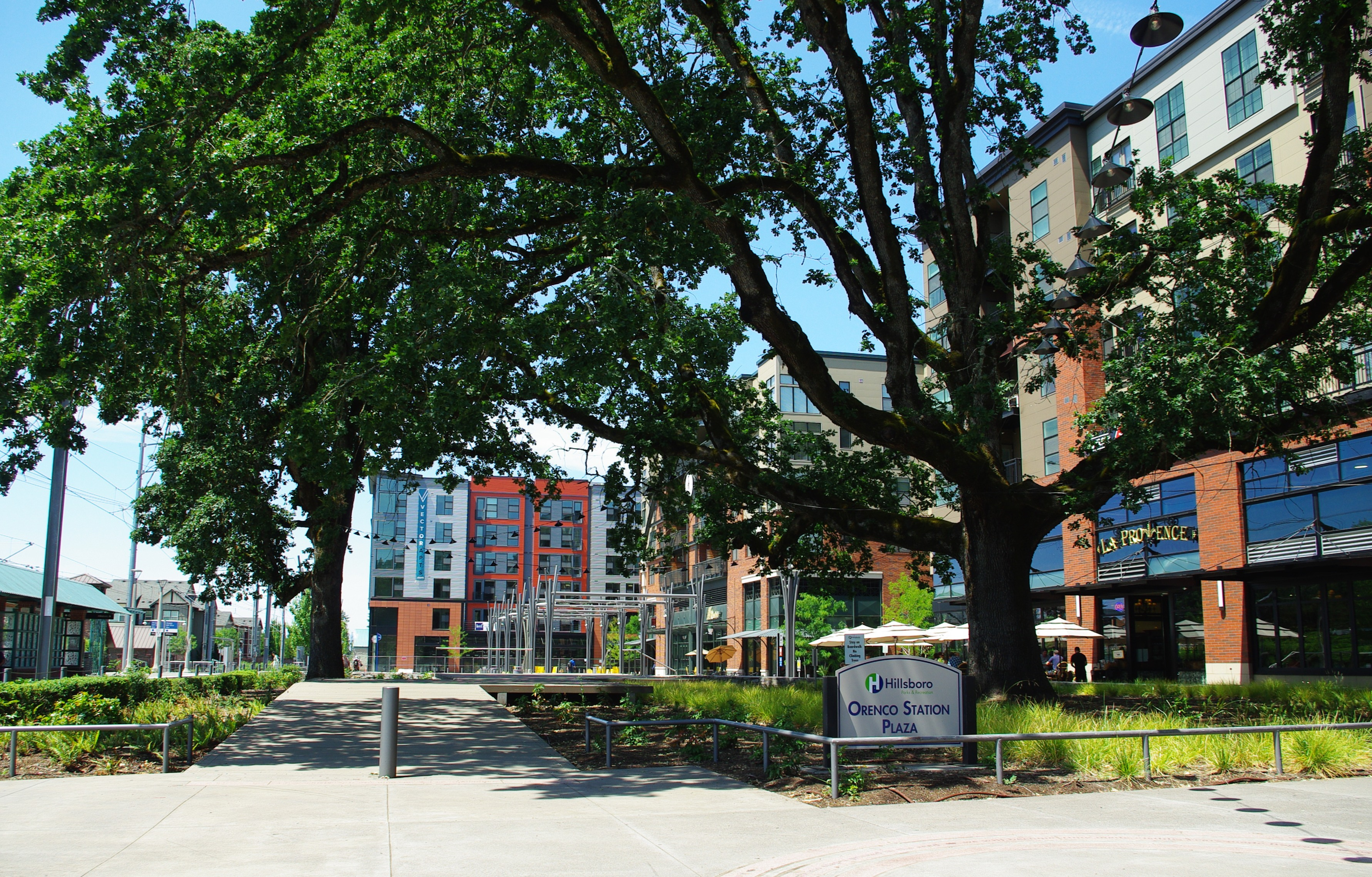
An oak tree at Orenco Station Plaza

Artwork at the station follows two themes: the history of Orenco and a celebration of trees. The artwork incorporates a grove of trees adjacent to the station that was preserved at the behest of the artists in charge of the artwork for the stop. Individual works of art include Rings of Memory Plaza, which consists of concentric circles of granite inscribed with text by Oregon Poet Laureate Kim Stafford. Another piece is a gravel path with stone seat walls leading to an old oak grove entitled Witness Tree Rest, which includes another line by Stafford inscribed on the granite threshold at the east end of the path. Grafted Path, a pathway that connects the station to Northeast Century Boulevard, illustrates the grafting method that distinguished Oregon Nursery Company trees. East of the station is Grove of Perspective, rows of trees that create optical effects when viewed from the moving train.

On the platform is a piece entitled Branch Benches, located in the passenger shelters, which are custom-made benches designed by Nancy Merritt and bracketed by wisteria-covered arbors. On top of the systems building sits a hand-forged sculpture of a tree, designed by Stuart Keeler and Michael Machnic. This weather vane spreads its roots and rises up through a nine-square grid that represents the city plan of Orenco.

== Services ==
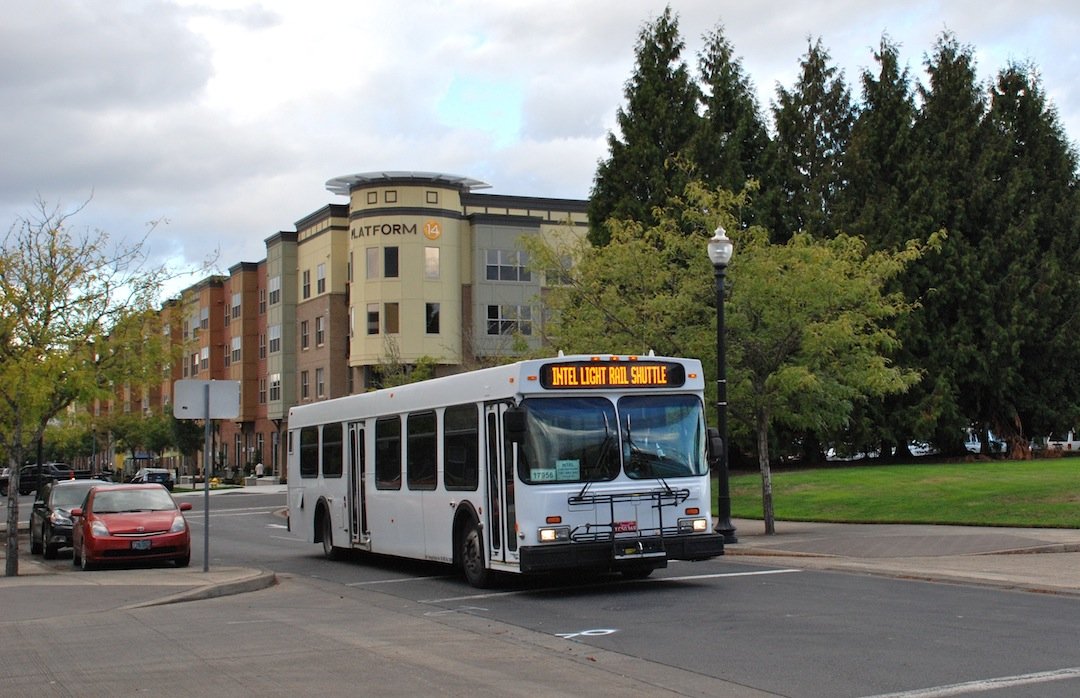
An Intel shuttle bus, which shuttles employees between the Ronler Acres campus and Orenco station, in 2013

Orenco station is situated between the Hawthorn Farm and Quatama stations as the seventh station eastbound on the MAX Blue Line, which runs from the station westbound to downtown Hillsboro and eastbound through Beaverton and Portland to Gresham. It is also the third station eastbound on the MAX Red Line, which runs from the station westbound to Hillsboro Airport/Fairgrounds station. Trains serve the station for approximately 22 hours per day on weekdays, 21½ hours on Saturdays, and 19½ hours on Sundays. The headway between trains measures from as little as five minutes during weekday rush hour to 30 minutes in the early mornings and late evenings; the majority of trains run every 15 minutes. From Orenco station, trains take thirteen minutes to reach Hatfield Government Center station in Hillsboro, 39 minutes to reach the Pioneer Square stations in downtown Portland, and 92 minutes to reach Cleveland Avenue station in Gresham. It recorded 1,297 average weekday boardings in fall 2018.

The station is served by TriMet bus route 47–Main/Baseline, which runs on weekdays to Hillsboro Central Transit Center and the Rock Creek campus of Portland Community College. Additionally, Ride Connection's North Hillsboro Link offers a free weekday bus service between the station and employment areas in North Hillsboro, while Intel operates a shuttle bus to transport employees to and from its nearby Ronler Acres campus.

=== Former bus service ===
The station was originally served by a TriMet bus route designated 42s–Orenco ("s" for shuttle), in addition to route 47, introduced with the station's opening in 1998. Route 42s was eliminated as a separate route in December 2001, when it was combined with route 47 but with a section along Orenco Station Parkway and Butler Road discontinued without replacement.
