= Cornell Road =

Street in Portland and Washington County, Oregon, United States

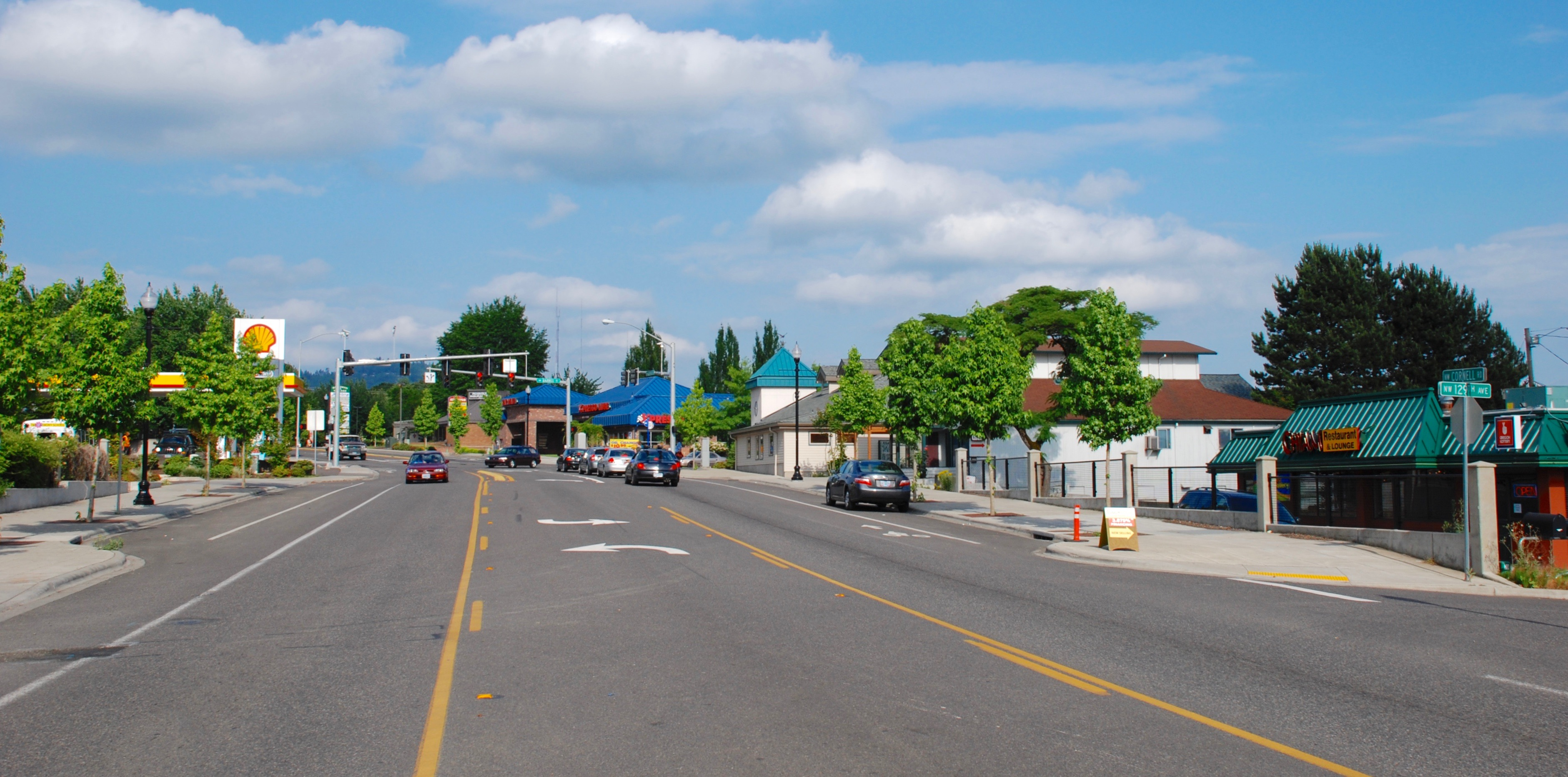
- Cornell Road in Cedar Mill
- Length: 14.7 mi (23.7 km)
- East end: NW Lovejoy Street in Portland
- Major junctions: Murray Blvd in Washington County; US 26 in Beaverton; NW 185th Avenue in Hillsboro; Cornelius Pass Road in Hillsboro; Brookwood Parkway in Hillsboro
- West end: E Main Street in Hillsboro

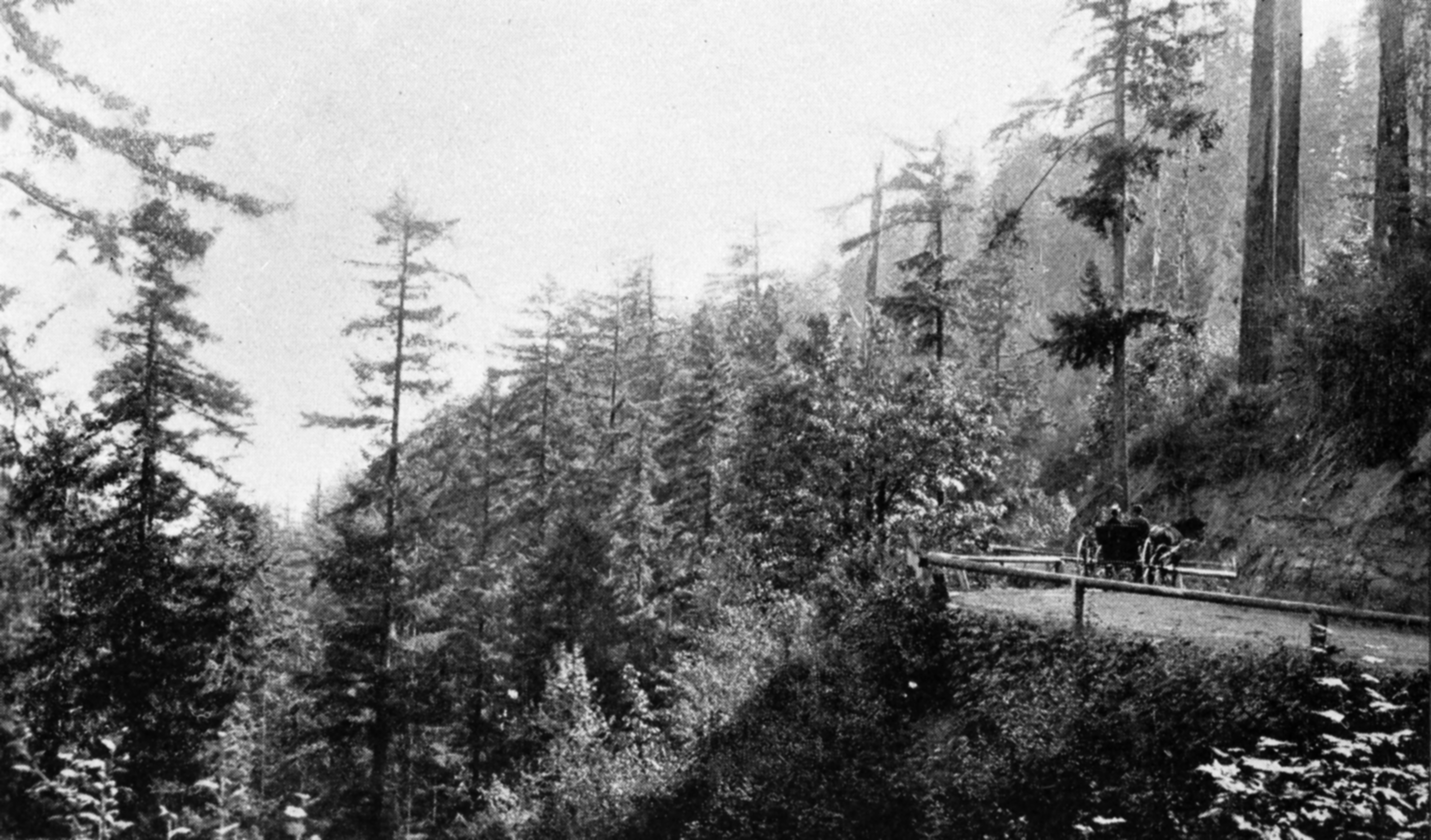
Cornell Road, from Frances Fuller Victor's Atlantis Arisen (1891)

The exit for Cornell Road and Bethany Boulevard on the Sunset Highway (US 26).

Cornell Road is an east–west street and traffic corridor in the Portland metropolitan area, in Multnomah and Washington counties in the U.S. state of Oregon. It crosses the Tualatin Mountains (West Hills) between the Willamette Valley and the city of Portland on the east and the Tualatin Valley and the city of Hillsboro on the west.

Cornell Road runs between the western end of Northwest Lovejoy Street in the Hillside neighborhood of Portland to East Main Street in Hillsboro, passing through unincorporated parts of Washington County and through Beaverton on the way. On the west side of NW 185th Ave, it is called Northeast Cornell Road, as it runs through the northeast quadrant of Hillsboro.

Although intended, on its section within the city of Portland, to be a neighborhood collector street with relatively low traffic volumes, it has often functioned as a major traffic street and commuter highway between downtown Portland and its western suburbs. It shares this role with more intensely busy traffic corridors along West Burnside Street and U.S. Route 26 (US 26). The road has at least two lanes in each direction the entire length while south of US 26, while those portions north of US 26 are largely one-lane in each direction.

== History ==
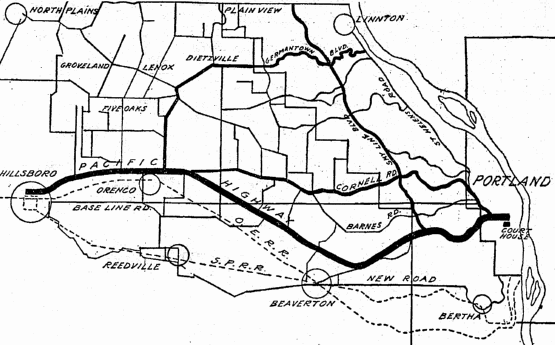
Map showing existing and proposed road alignments in Washington County in 1917

The first section of the road was already in existence in the 1850s. It is named for William and Emily Castle Cornell, who moved onto a donation land claim on what is now Cornell Road, just east of the present-day western boundary of Multnomah County, in 1852. William Cornell, a descendant of Thomas Cornell, worked as a preacher and Sunday-school teacher in the Cedar Mill area, in nearby Washington County. Businessman John B. Yeon was the roadmaster as of 1915 for the Portland section, on what was described that year as "delightfully smooth" for the stretch in Portland. Plans for the Pacific Highway from 1917 show Cornell joining it near present-day 185th, with that highway then continuing to downtown Hillsboro. That highway was never built as such, but the alignment is similar to the route followed by U.S. 26 and Cornell's route from approximately 185th Avenue to its western terminus. The section between 185th and 173rd was widened to three lanes in 1981.

NW Cornell Road was renamed to NE Cornell Road between Cornelius Pass and 185th in March 2018. Previously, Sections of the road west of Cornelius Pass Road had been renamed to match Hillsboro's street grid system when they were annexed, beginning in 1959.

== Mass transit ==
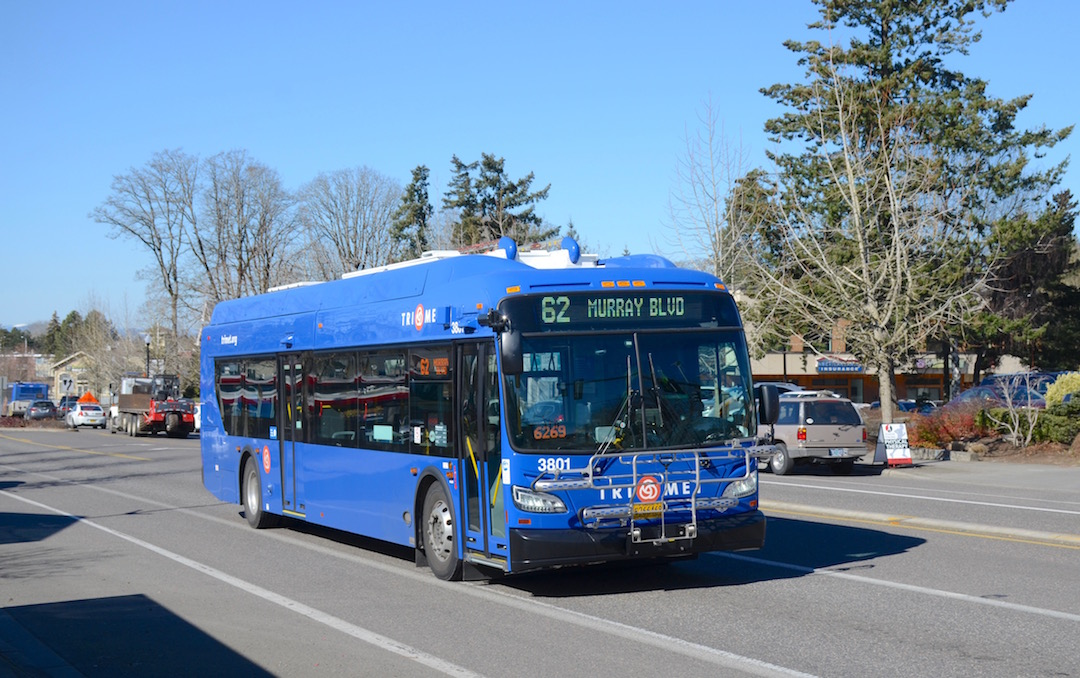
A TriMet battery-electric bus on line 62 on Cornell Road in Cedar Mill, 2019

The main TriMet bus line along Cornell Road is number 48-Cornell. Serving communities on the western side of the West Hills, it has stops between Northwest Cedar Hills Boulevard/Northwest 113th Avenue (opposite sides of the same intersection), in Cedar Mill, and Cornell Road's western terminus in Hillsboro. This bus line continues west from the end of Northeast Cornell Road to the Hillsboro Transit Center, with connections to other bus lines and to the MAX Blue Line, linking Hillsboro to Beaverton, Portland, and other communities by light rail.

Other bus lines stopping along shorter segments of Cornell Road include line 62-Murray Blvd., between Northwest Murray Boulevard and Cedar Hills Blvd. The easternmost segment of Cornell, between Northwest Lovejoy Street and Northwest Westover Road in Portland's Hillside neighborhood, is served by bus line 18-Hillside.

== Tunnels ==
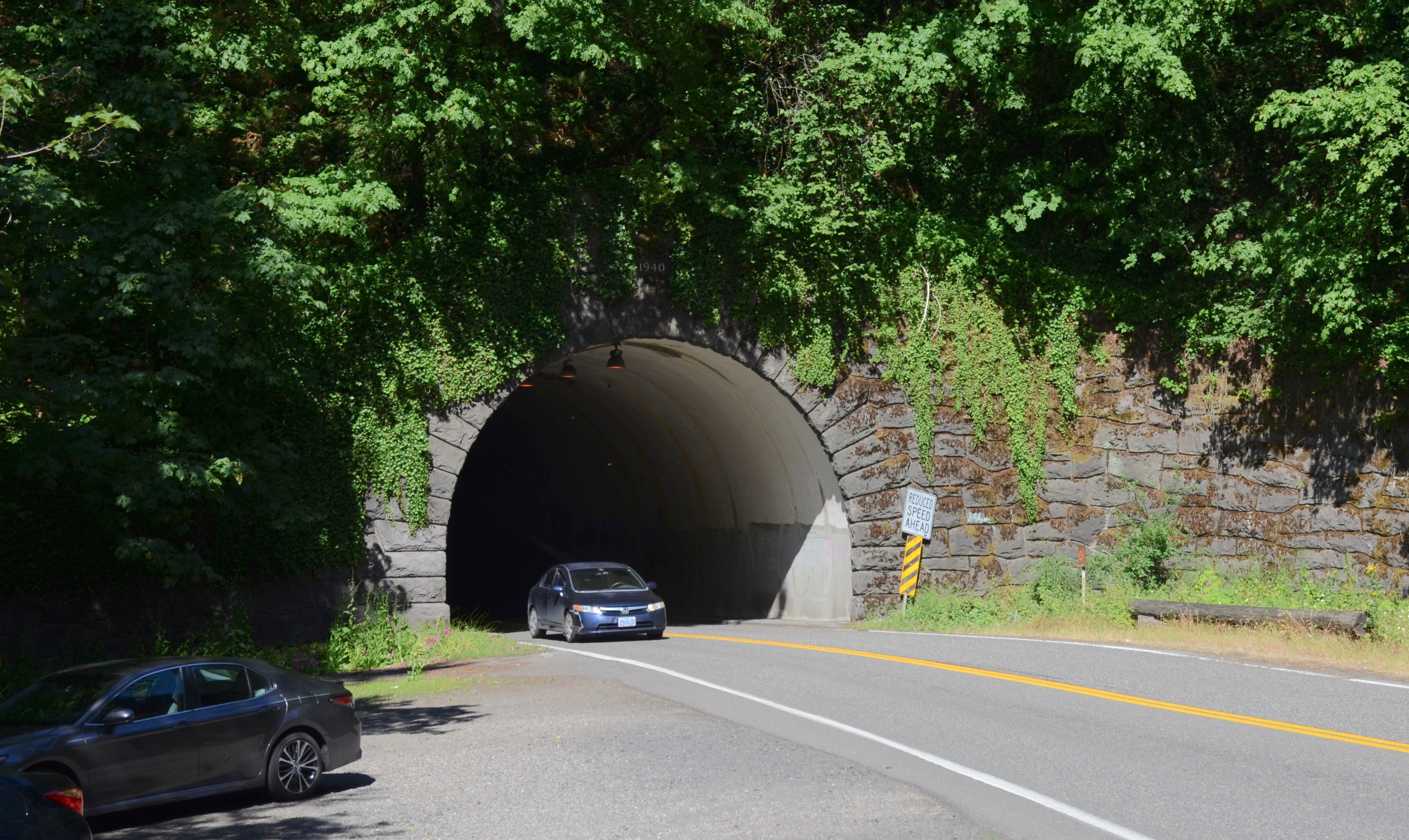
West portal of one of the road's two tunnels in the West Hills of Portland

Cornell Road passes through two tunnels drilled through basalt in the West Hills. Laborers hired by the Works Progress Administration built both, the first and easternmost in 1940 and the second in 1941. Northwest Cornell Road Tunnel 1 is 500 feet (150 m) long and has a horizontal clearance of about 28 feet (8.5 m). Tunnel 2 is 250 feet (76 m) long with a horizontal clearance of about 27 feet (8.2 m). Both are lined with concrete and have portals of stone masonry.

== Realignment ==
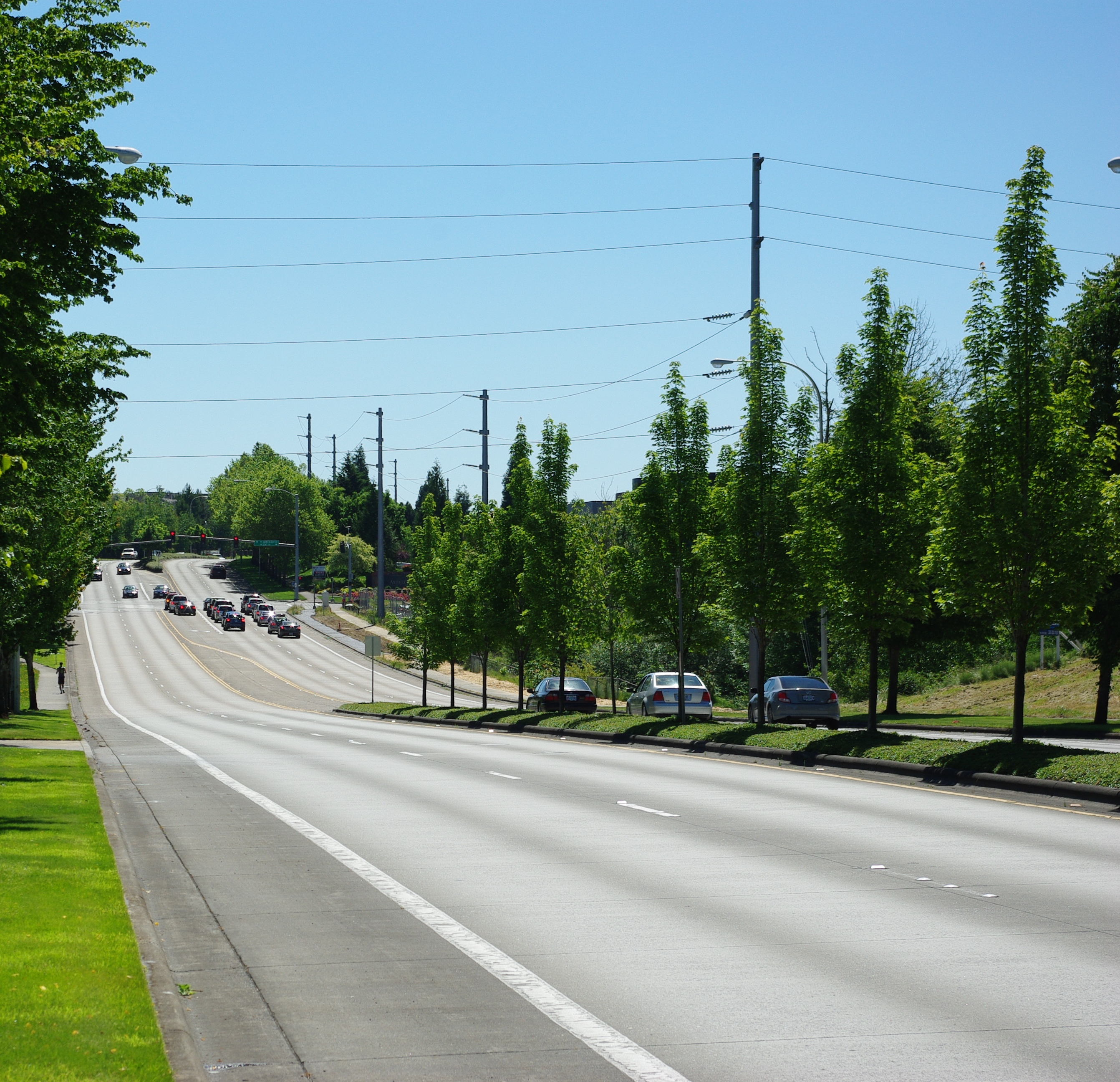
Cornell near Aloclek Drive in Hillsboro. This section of Cornell was opened as a new alignment in 1995, replacing an older, narrower section to the south.

The nearly 2-mile (3 km) current section of Cornell Road between N.W. 192nd Avenue (now N.E. 102nd Avenue) and N.W. 229th Avenue (now N.E. Century Blvd.) was built as a completely new – and wider – alignment between about 1986 and 1995, to replace the original alignment on that section, which was located about one-fifth of a mile south of the current alignment. The section between 229th and Cornelius Pass Road opened in 1987, while the section between Cornelius Pass Road and Stucki Avenue opened in stages in the mid-1990s, the final phase being the stretch between John Olsen Avenue/206th and Cornelius Pass Road, completed in 1995. The old alignment had been two lanes wide, whereas the new one had four to five lanes. Some portions of the old alignment were abandoned, but the section east of Cornelius Pass Road, initially renamed Old Cornell Road, became N.W. Amberwood Drive (and years later, in 2018, was renamed N.E. Walker Road). The realignment projects, together with widening of certain other two-lane sections of Cornell to four or more lanes during that period, were intended by Hillsboro and Washington County officials to transform the road into a major arterial in the Beaverton–Hillsboro area, the "third-largest east–west thoroughfare" on the Portland metropolitan area's west side (after the Sunset Highway/US 26 and Tualatin Valley Highway).

== See also ==
- List of streets in Portland, Oregon
