= Perpetuity (sculpture) =

Sculpture in Portland, Oregon

Coordinates: 45.5098°N 122.7189°W

- Artist: Alexander von Svoboda
- Year: 1970
- Type: Sculpture
- Medium: Bronze, redwood
- Dimensions: 3.0 m × 3.0 m × 0.91 m (10 ft × 10 ft × 3 ft); 9.8 m diameter (32 ft)
- Location: Portland, Oregon, United States
- Owner: World Forestry Center

Perpetuity is an outdoor 1970 sculpture by Alexander von Svoboda, located in Portland, Oregon.

== Description and history ==
External image
- Standard Insurance Center (Portland, Oregon) by Marion Dean Ross (June 6, 1970), University of Oregon Libraries

Perpetuity is a sculpture by Alexander von Svoboda, completed in 1970. It consists of a bronze "seedling" inside a hollowed-out cross section of a 350 feet (110 m), Giant Sequoia tree. The seedling is suspended by bronze shafts that pierce the wood and extend several feet beyond, creating a "sunburst" effect. The sculpture measures approximately 10 feet (3.0 m) x 10 feet (3.0 m) x 3 feet (0.91 m), has a 32-foot (9.8 m) diameter, and weighs 13.5 tons. It rests on a concrete base which measures approximately 85 inches (220 cm) x 38 inches (97 cm) x 38 inches (97 cm). The Smithsonian Institution categorizes the piece as abstract and allegorical ("time", "eternity").

According to Svoboda, the work symbolizes "growth, regeneration and the perpetual cycle of life". Smithsonian offers the following remark by Svoboda: "This is perpetual, the beginning and end of life, or to say it another way, there is no end and no beginning..." The sculpture was surveyed and considered "treatment urgent" by Smithsonian's "Save Outdoor Sculpture!" program in 1993. By then, the sculpture was owned by the World Forestry Center and installed in front of its Merlo Hall, having been donated by Standard Insurance Company.

== See also ==
- 1970 in art
- Perpetuity (the twelfth and thirteenth photos on the page). Archived here.
- The Quest (1970) by Svoboda, installed in front of Portland's Standard Insurance Center
