= Tanasbourne, Oregon =

Neighborhood in Oregon, United States

- Neighborhood
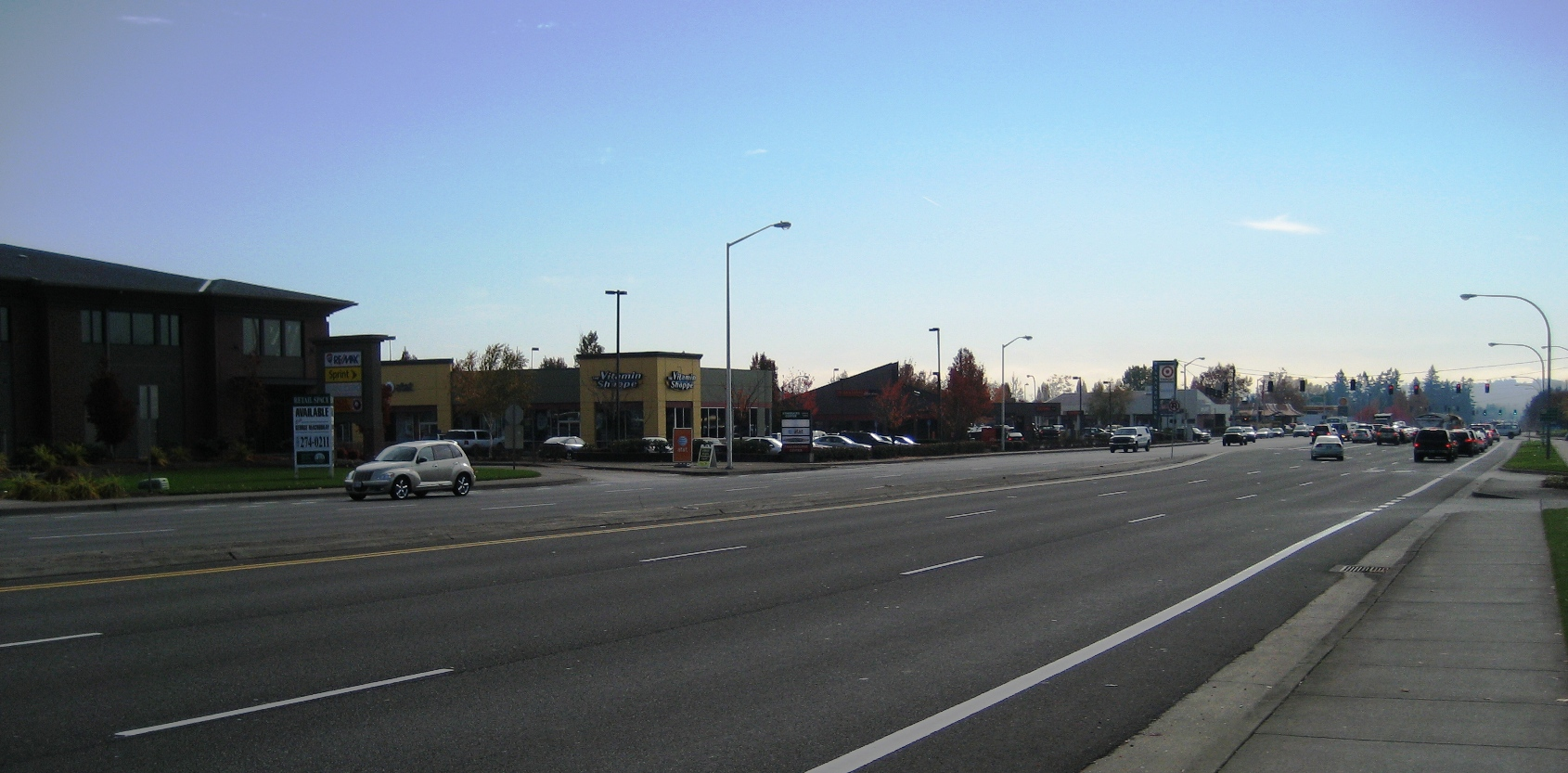
- 185th Avenue looking south from Sunset Highway
- Interactive map of Tanasbourne, Oregon
- Coordinates: 45.534°N 122.876°W
- Country: United States
- State: Oregon
- Region: Washington County
- Time zone: Pacific
- Postal code: 97124; 97006
- Part of: Hillsboro; Beaverton

Tanasbourne is a neighborhood in Washington County, Oregon, where NW 185th Avenue and the Sunset Highway (part of U.S. Highway 26) intersect. It is located within the greater Portland metropolitan area. The area includes portions of Beaverton and Hillsboro, and is generally considered to be south of U.S. 26, north of Walker Road, west of 158th, and east of Cornelius Pass Road. Adjacent to Aloha and part of the West Metro region, Tanasbourne has many shopping areas and is the former home of the defunct Tanasbourne Mall.

== History ==
In the 1970s, Standard Insurance Company developed a large tract of land along the Sunset Highway near 185th Avenue. The name of the development is a hybrid of tenas from the Chinook Jargon and the Middle English term bourn. Tenas translates as small and bourn as creek (see burn in Scottish English), giving the term tanasbourne the meaning of small, pretty creeks.

Standard developed an indoor mall at the site, with the mall opening in 1975. In 1976, a library was opened in the community, and in 1990 the City of Hillsboro took over those operations and maintained the branch until 2007, when it was closed and a new main branch of the Hillsboro Public Library was opened farther west. In 1983, the county approved a master plan created by Standard to develop 850 acres (340 ha) at Tanasbourne. Hillsboro annexed much of the Tanasbourne area in 1987. The next year plans were announced for an expansion of the old mall along with construction of new retail buildings in the area. The mall was never expanded.

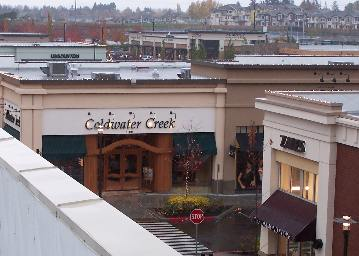
The Streets of Tanasbourne shopping complex

Hillsboro started working to designate the area as a town center within Metro's planning framework in 1996. The Streets of Tanasbourne lifestyle shopping mall opened along Cornell Road in October 2004 after original approval for the project in 2000. A series of new hotels opened starting in 2015 with an Embassy Suites location, and included Hampton Inn, Home2Suites, and a Holiday Inn. An Oxford Suites Hotel and a Candlewood Suites were also planned along Cornell Road at Aloclek Drive.

=== Tanasbourne Mall ===
In 1974, construction began on a $6 million shopping mall to be named Tanasbourne Town Center, located on the east side of Northwest 185th adjacent to the Sunset Highway. This two-story, 152,000-square-foot (14,100 m^{2}) mall was completed in 1975 by owners Standard Insurance. The original tenants included a library, a day care, professional offices, and a three-screen movie theater named Town Center Cinemas. A TriMet park-and-ride lot was constructed adjacent to the mall. Tanasbourne Town Center also had an official alternative name of Tanasbourne Mall, which was commonly used by the public.

In 1988, plans called for developing a shopping area around the mall that would have more than 1,000,000 square feet (93,000 m^{2}), including the mall. The mall would also be renovated as part of the plan that included Standard selling part of their development, including the mall, to Pacific Rim Development Corporation.

In 1990, a new outdoor shopping center was opened across 185th Avenue from the indoor mall. Many of the mall's tenants, such as anchors Safeway and PayLess Drug (now Rite Aid), moved to the newer shopping center, creating vacancies in the enclosed mall. The old building was torn down in 1993 and replaced with an outdoor shopping center that includes Target. One of that shopping center's original anchors was a 75,000-square-foot (7,000 m^{2}) Mervyn's, but it closed in 2006, with the space then divided for use by two smaller stores.

== Features ==
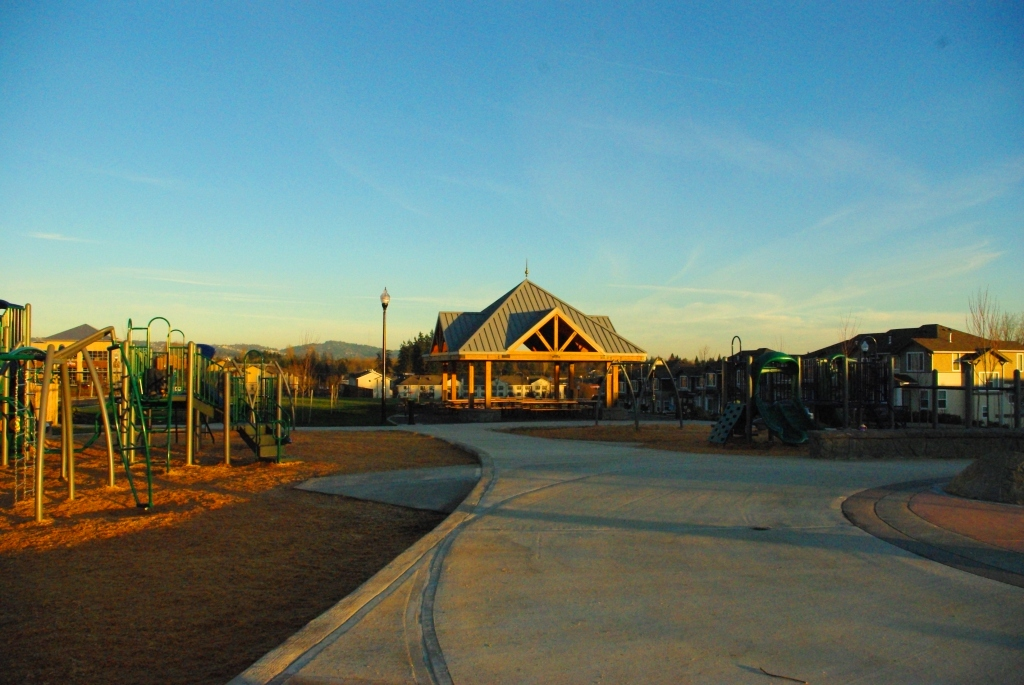
Magnolia Park

Tanasbourne sits at 236 feet (72 m) above sea level. Most of the community is within the city of Hillsboro, which maintains a police station in the vicinity. Hillsboro also has several parks in the area, including Evergreen Park, Orchard Park, and Magnolia Park. The area is split between the Hillsboro School District and the Beaverton School District.

The area is a regional shopping hub that includes the Tanasbourne Town Center, Tanasbourne Village, and The Streets of Tanasbourne. Besides shopping centers, Tanasbourne is home to large apartment complexes, industrial/commercial parks, numerous hotels, and many medical facilities. Kaiser Permanente opened a new hospital, Kaiser Westside Medical Center, in the community in August 2013. Located in Oregon's Silicon Forest, the area is home to Epson's Portland operation, a large Tokyo Electron office, the headquarters for Virginia Garcia Memorial Health Center, a complex housing offices for Standard Insurance Company, and OHSU's West Campus.
