= Hilda Grossman Morris =

American artist and sculptor

- Hilda Morris with sculpture, 1959
- Born: Hilda Grossman; 1911; New York City, New York, U.S.
- Died: 1991 (aged 79–80); Orange, California, U.S.
- Known for: Sculpture
- Spouses: Arthur Deutsch ending in divorce in 1930: Carl Morris; (m. 1940)

Hilda Grossman (Deutsch) Morris (1911–1991) was an artist and sculptor of the Northwest School, working mainly in bronze.

== Biography ==
Grossman was born in New York City in 1911. She studied art at Cooper Union and the Art Students League of New York. Her first husband was Arthur Deutsch, from whom she was divorced in 1930.

In 1938 the Works Progress Administration hired her to establish the sculpture program at the Spokane Art Center in Spokane, Washington. In Spokane she met the artists Clyfford Still, Guy Anderson, and the Abstract Expressionist painter Carl Morris whom she married in 1940. Their marriage sparked a life-long partnership between the two artists which enabled them to continuously improve upon their own work through mutual support, without one overshadowing the other in the spotlight.

Morris and her husband settled in Portland, Oregon in 1941. Except for extended trips to her hometown New York City and in later years Pietrasanta, Italy to cast bronze sculptures, she worked in Portland. Her work introduced rigorous thinking about abstraction to the Pacific Northwest incorporating the rhythms of dance, music, and mathematics, emphasizing the organization of organic structure. Hilda and Carl's friendship with fellow artist and Northwest School founder Mark Tobey also contributed influences on the styles and symbolism she would explore in her work, including Eastern calligraphy techniques.

In addition to what she accomplished through her teaching positions, Morris’ involvement with the Northwest School movement also brought national attention to the growing modernist art scene in the Pacific Northwest area. Hilda Morris' works have been shown in exhibitions at the San Francisco Museum of Art; Denver Art Museum; Portland Art Museum; Seattle Art Museum; Dayton Art Institute; Amon Carter Museum; University of Illinois; Seattle World's Fair; University of California, LA; Brooklyn Museum; Museum of Modern Art, São Paulo, Brazil; Rio de Janeiro, Brazil; and American Federation of Arts traveling exhibitions. In 1960 she was awarded a major fellowship by the Ford Foundation. Commissioned sculptures by Hilda Morris are in the Seattle Opera House (Muted Harp); Standard Plaza, Portland (Ring of Time); and Pacific National Building, Tacoma, Washington (Sea Myth).

Her work is represented in the collections of the Chase-Manhattan Bank; California Palace of the Legion of Honor; Museum of the Munson-Williams-Proctor Institute; University of Oregon Museum of Art; Reed College (Wind Gate); University of Victoria, BC; Tacoma Art Museum; Walter P. Chrysler Jr., Collection of the Virginia Museum; and San Francisco Museum of Art.

Morris died in 1991 in Orange, California. A retrospective of her work was held at the Portland Art Museum in 2006.
