= Orchard Park (Oregon) =

Park in Hillsboro, Oregon

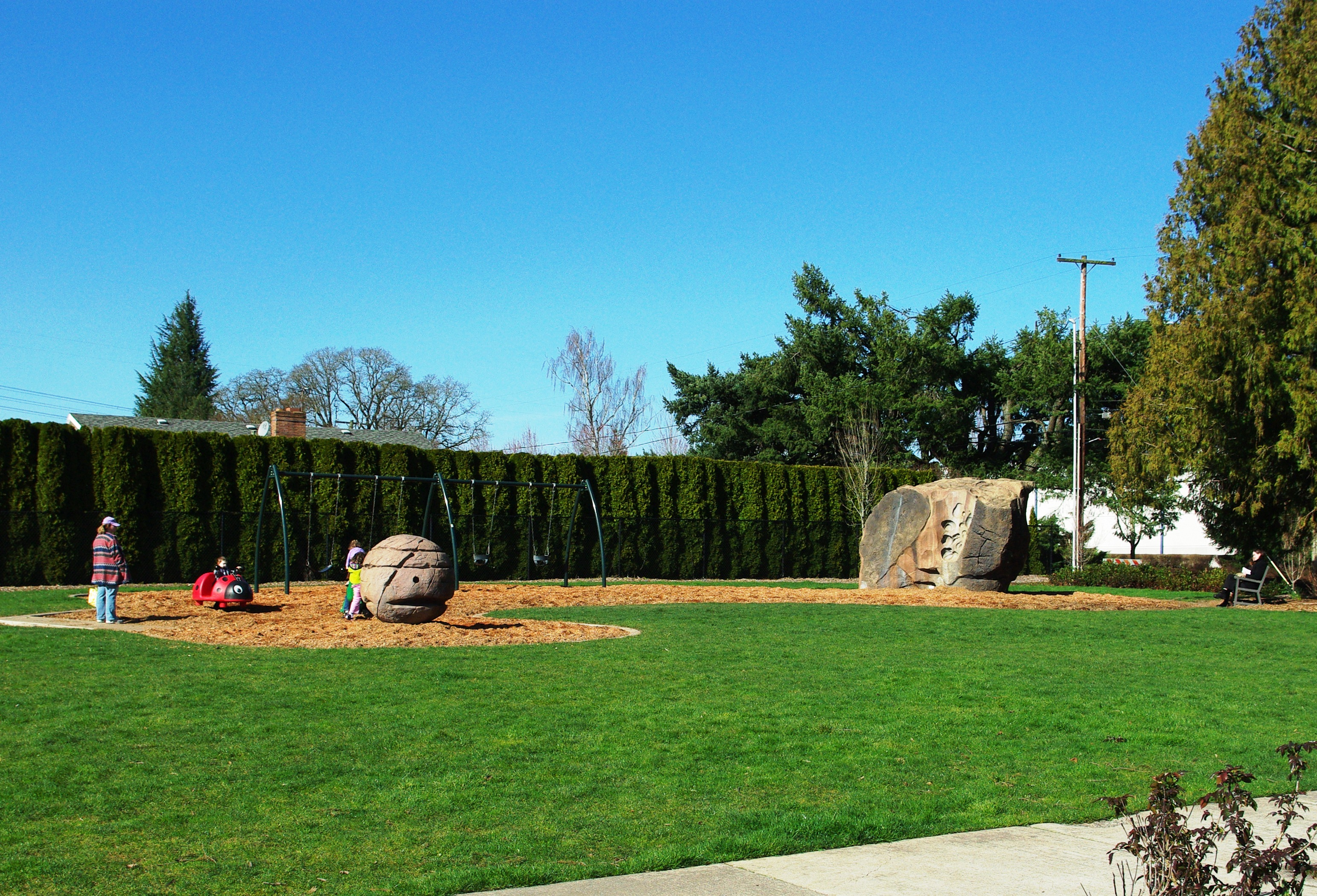
- Playground at the park
- Interactive map of Orchard Park
- Type: Public, city
- Location: Hillsboro, Oregon; United States
- Coordinates: 45°32′2″N 122°53′32″W
- Area: 41 acres (170,000 m^{2})
- Created: 2003
- Operator: Hillsboro Parks & Recreation Department
- Status: open
- Website: Orchard Park

Orchard Park is a municipal park in Hillsboro in the U.S. state of Oregon. Opened in 2003, the park covers 21 acres (8.5 ha) along Rock Creek in the Tanasbourne neighborhood. The park includes nature trails, a playground, and a nine-hole disc golf course. Employees of the R.E.I. store at the nearby The Streets of Tanasbourne adopted the park in the city’s 'Adopt a Park' program.

== History ==
Metro, the regional government in the Portland metropolitan area, purchased 21 acres (8.5 ha) of greenspace in 1997 using funds from a 1995 bond measure passed to buy greenspace in the region. The Nofziger family sold the property to Metro for $1 million. The site was along a section of Amberwood Drive that for many years had been part of Cornell Road, until the mid-1990s, when Cornell was re-aligned to the north in the area and the old Cornell renamed Amberwood Drive.

Hillsboro was given the property by Metro to develop a park, with the city expected to spend $1 million on development according to initial estimates. The funds to develop the park came from fees that developers were charged when building in the city. The park was originally named Nofziger Park, and was to be mainly a wetlands preserve as the property is situated in a floodplain. It would also have trails along Rock Creek to connect to U.S. 26 north of the park.

During the summer of 2001, students from Hillsboro’s Miller Education Center worked at the park site to improve the riparian area of Rock Creek and to gather data about the stream’s ecology. In 2002, the park was renamed as Orchard Park in honor of Hillsboro’s agricultural heritage, and the first phase of park development began in July. The first phase built boardwalks, trails, wildlife viewing spots, bridges, and a parking lot, and was expected to be completed in December 2002. The old farmhouse remained standing through the first phase, with later development calling for its demolition along with construction of restrooms.

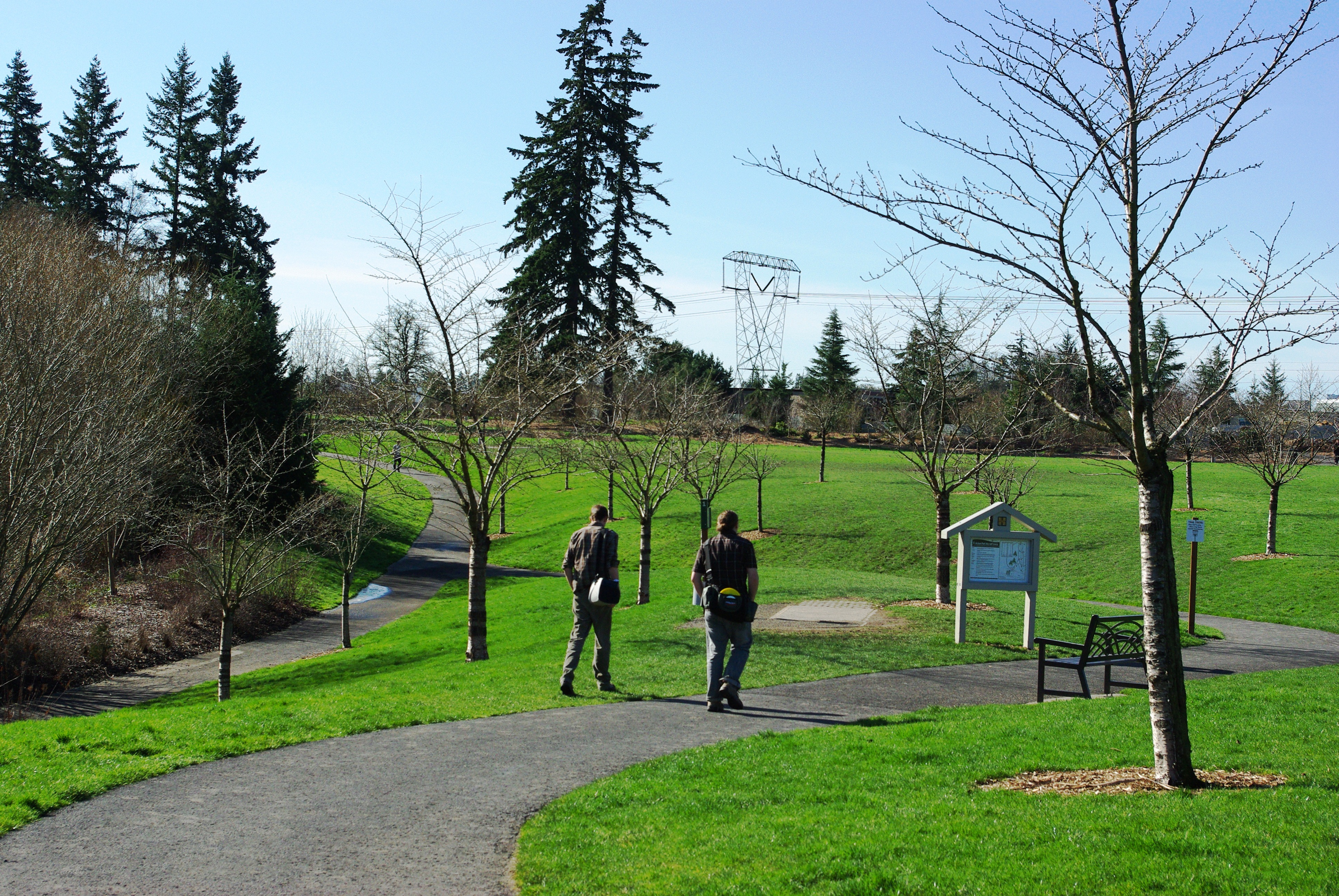
Disc golfers heading to the first tee

On June 24, 2003, the park was officially dedicated. The design of the park won the 2003 Oregon Recreation & Parks Association Design Award. The city had hoped to build a new library on a property just north of Orchard Park, but bond measures in 2002 and 2004 were defeated, and the city later acquired an existing building for the main branch of the Hillsboro Public Library. The city considered adding a disc golf course at the park when it opened, but did not build a course until 2005. The course cost $12,000 to build and was the first disc golf course in a Hillsboro park. Hillsboro’s parks department has offered free classes at the park to teach people how to play the game.

In 2005, Hillsboro was given a $675,000 grant from Metro to extend the Rock Creek Trail from the park south to Northwest Wilkens Street. As of October 2009, the city was still planning the trail extension. Future plans call for continuing the Rock Creek Trail all the way to Rood Bridge Park on the south side of the city.

In 2006, R.E.I. donated $10,000 to the city to build a pair of boulders at the park that can be climbed, and the next year the Hillsboro store’s employees adopted the park. The boulders and some other play equipment opened in 2008. As part of National Public Lands Day in 2008, R.E.I. sponsored a project to improve the park. The city plans on building a picnic shelter at the park as well.

== Amenities ==
Orchard Park is in the Tanasbourne area and is largely a nature park, though it has some developed features. Developed items include the disc golf course, a play area, off-street parking, and restrooms. The free disc golf course covers 2,000 feet (610 m), has nine-holes, and is the only course in Hillsboro. The play area next to the parking lot includes climbing boulders, swings, and spring riders.

The park has 3,000 feet (910 m) of paved trails leading to 700 feet (210 m) of boardwalk, several bridges, and three wildlife overlooks. The trails pass through wetlands, meadows, and wooded areas in several loops. Fauna and flora at the park include deer, beavers, herons, Douglas fir, hemlock trees, alders, cherry tree, dogwoods, elderberry, Ponderosa pines, and maples.
