= Ring of Time =

Sculpture in Portland, Oregon

- The sculpture in 2015
- Artist: Hilda Grossman Morris
- Year: 1965–1967
- Type: Sculpture
- Medium: Bronze
- Dimensions: 3.0 m (120 in)
- Location: Portland, Oregon, United States; 45.51597°N 122.67986°W
- Owner: Standard Insurance Company

Ring of Time, also known as The Ring of Time, is an outdoor bronze sculpture by Hilda Grossman Morris, located at the entrance to the Standard Plaza in Portland, Oregon. The allegorical sculpture was created during 1965–1967 and is owned by the Standard Insurance Company.

== Description and history ==
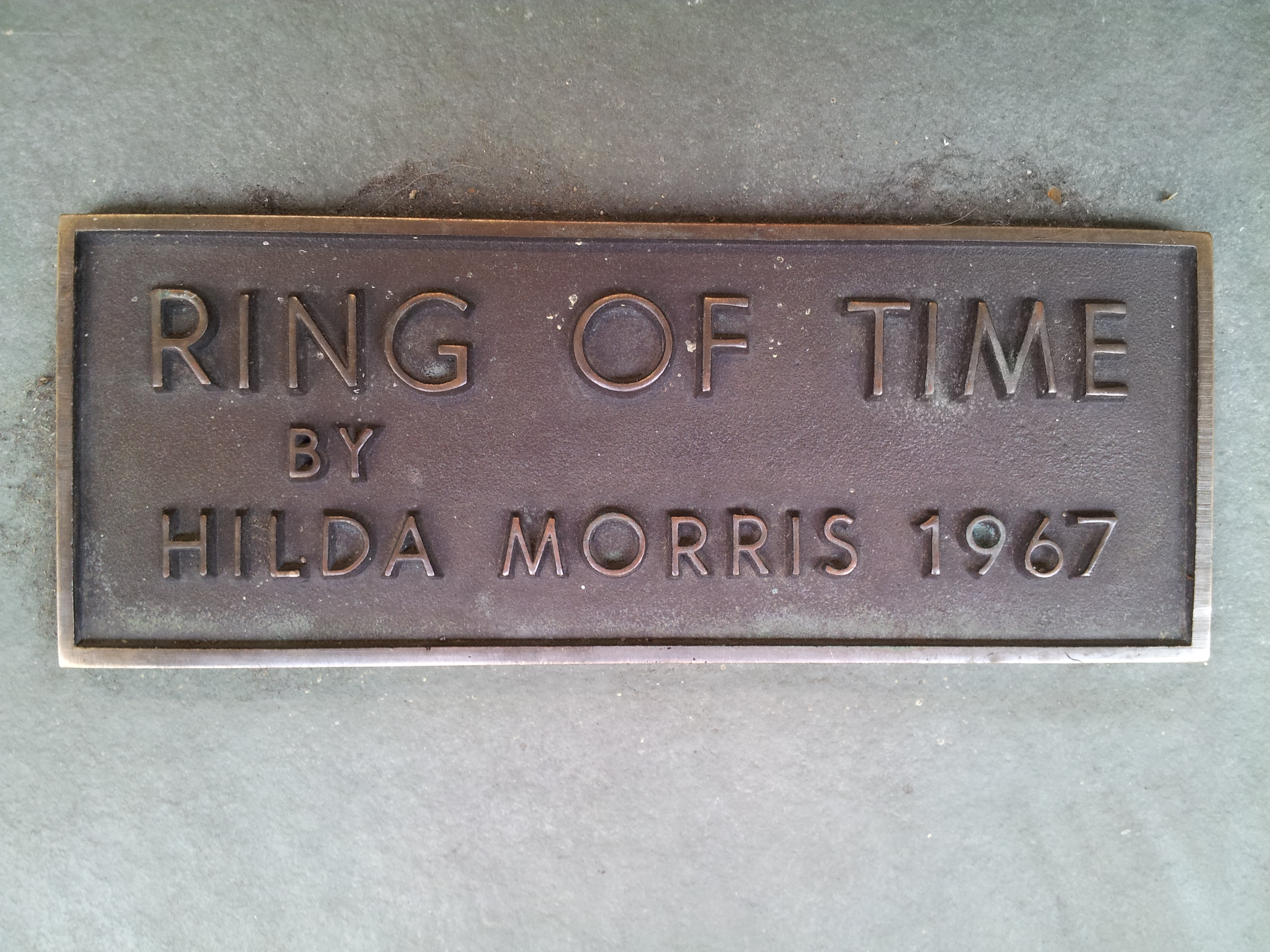
Plaque for the sculpture

Ring of Time is a monumental bronze sculpture installed in the outer foyer of the Standard Plaza on Southwest 6th between Madison and Main in Downtown Portland's Transit Mall. It was designed by Hilda Grossman Morris and created during 1965–1967. The allegorical sculpture, which represents time, is 120 inches (3.0 m) tall and owned by the Standard Insurance Company. Portland Tribune has described the sculpture as "rough" and "primitive", as well as "chunky, clunky, big and funky".

== Reception ==
Emporis has referred to Ring of Time as one of the city's "most admired" sculptures.

== See also ==
- 1967 in art
