= Magnolia Park (Hillsboro, Oregon) =

City park in Hillsboro, Oregon, United States

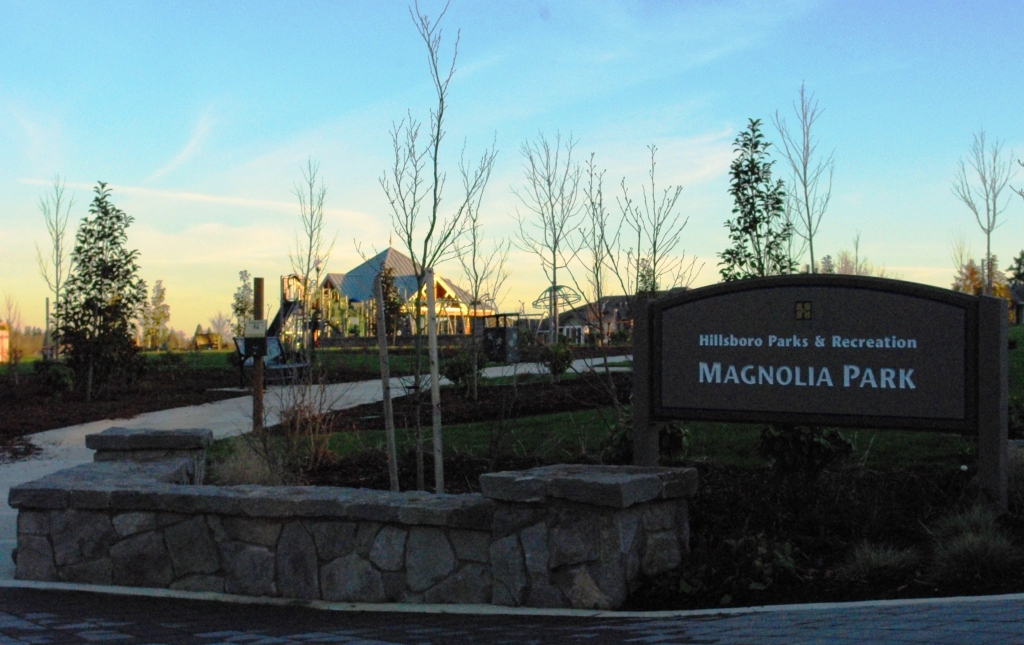
- Entrance
- Interactive map of Magnolia Park
- Type: Public, city
- Location: Hillsboro, Oregon; United States
- Coordinates: 45°31′57″N 122°52′29″W
- Area: 3.11 acres (12,600 m^{2})
- Created: 2008
- Operator: Hillsboro Parks & Recreation Department
- Status: open: Magnolia Park

Magnolia Park is a municipal park in the Tanasbourne neighborhood of Hillsboro, Oregon. Opened in 2008, the 3.11 acres (12,600 m^{2}) community park is off northeast 102nd avenue (formerly named NW 192nd Ave until April 15, 2018) between Walker and Cornell roads near the Streets of Tanasbourne shopping center. The park includes a basketball court, children's play equipment, picnic shelter, tennis court, and water fountain designed for cooling among other amenities.

== History ==
Plans for a park in the Hillsboro portion of the Tanasbourne neighborhood began around 2003. In August 2007, Hillsboro approved construction of park and choose the name of Magnolia Park. The construction cost $1 million and was accomplished by Paul Brothers Incorporated. Funds for construction came from system development fees charged by Hillsboro. After ten months of construction, Magnolia Park officially opened on September 11, 2008, though construction was finished in August. The facility was the first park in the city to have a water play area as well as the first to include art in the design.

== Amenities ==
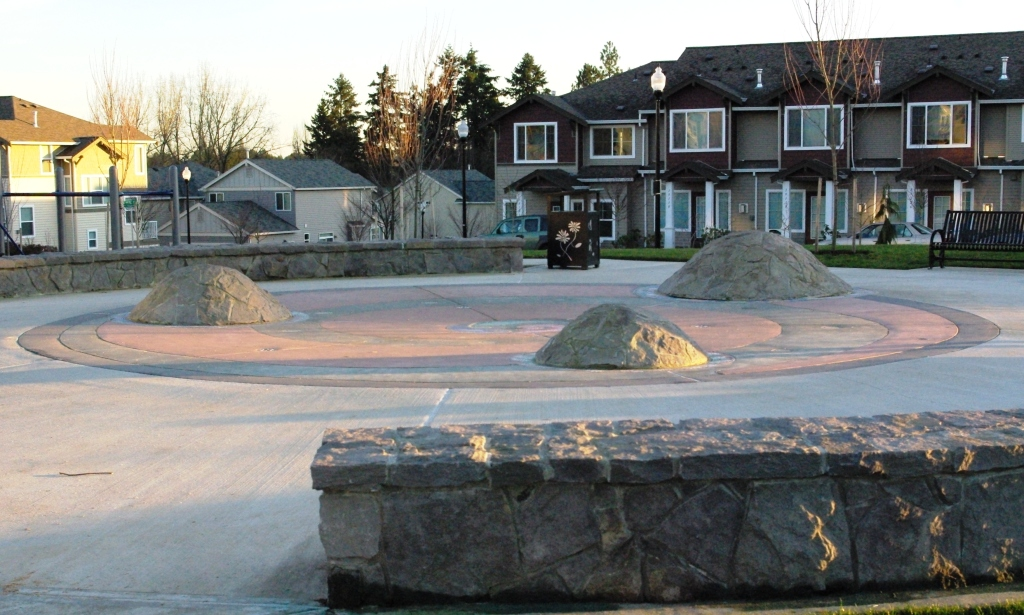
Fountain

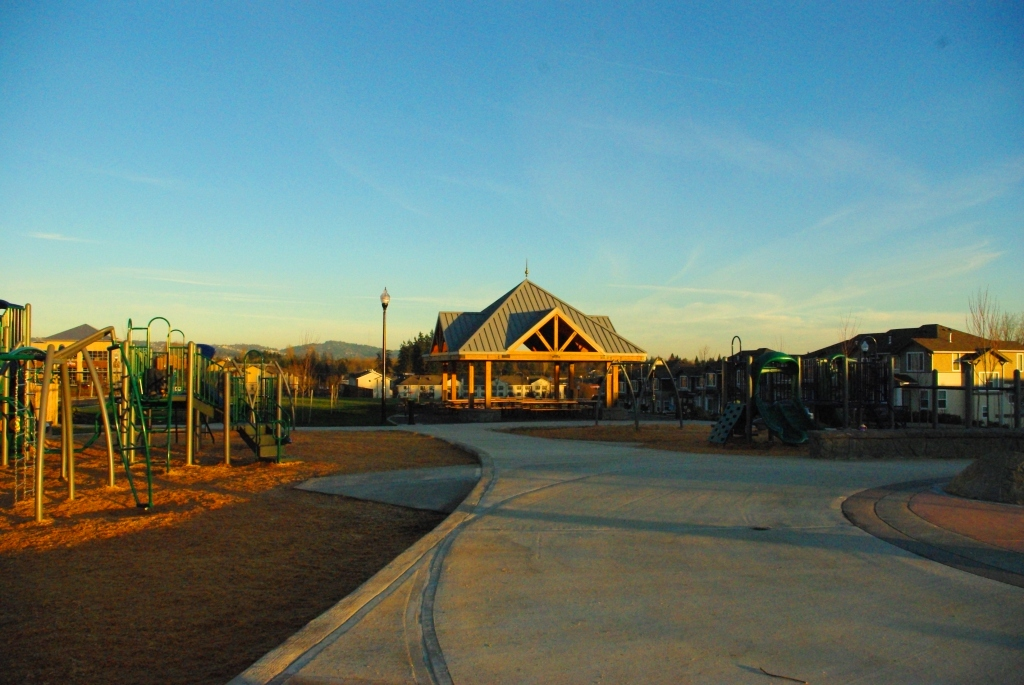
Play equipment and picnic shelter

Magnolia Park is 3.11 acres (12,600 m^{2}) in size and is the city's easternmost park. The park is located in the Tanasbourne neighborhood and was adopted by the Trader Joe's store as part of Hillsboro's adopt-a-park program. Magnolia is between Cornell and Walker roads and surrounded by a retail development that includes Whole Foods, a retirement community, and condominiums. Amenities at the park include a water fountain designed for children to play in, walking areas, open grass areas, children's play equipment, athletic equipment, natural areas, and a covered picnic area.

Natural features of the park include 180 trees, in excess of 1,000 flowers, and approximately 68,000 square feet (6,300 m^{2}) of lawn. The trees include five species of magnolia trees, and many are located in a grove. The park also has a rain garden designed to collect water and improve the local watershed. Athletic facilities at the park include a half-size basketball court and one tennis court. The picnic shelter is rented out by the city's parks department.

The water feature is at ground level and decorated with mosaic art that is designed to appear to change color when wet. Seasonal, the twenty-five foot fountain's mosaic includes designs featuring magnolia tree names and images and boulders with water jets. The play equipment features two structures, one for children under five years old, and one for older children along with swings and a slide, with a total of 5,000 square feet (460 m^{2}) in the playground.
