= Kaiser Westside Medical Center =

- Kaiser Permanente

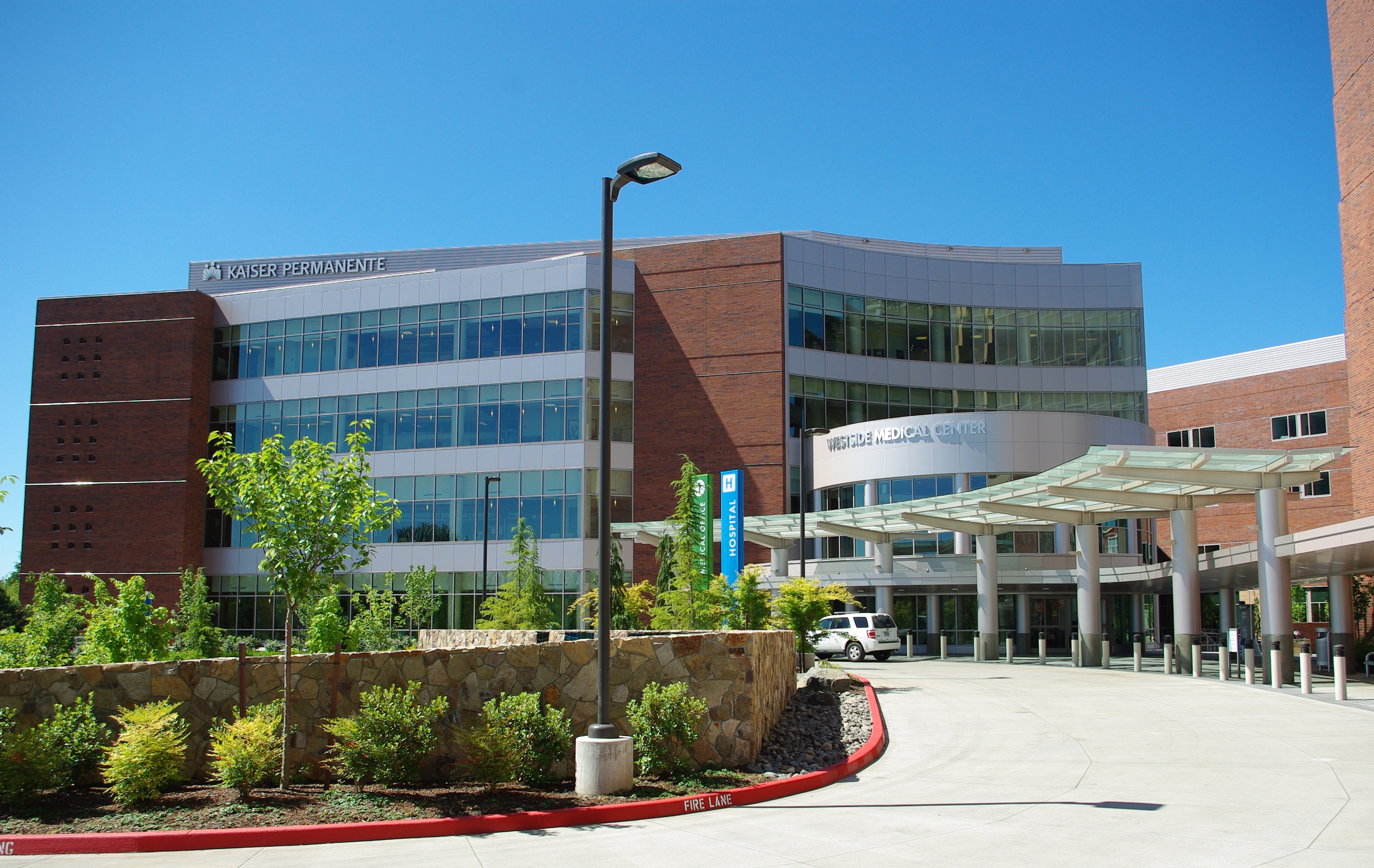
- Main entrance

Geography
- Location: Hillsboro, Washington County, Oregon, United States
- Coordinates: 45°32′21″N 122°52′38″W

Organization
- Type: Acute

Services
- Beds: 126

History
- Founded: 2013

Links
- Website: Official link
- Lists: Hospitals in Oregon

Kaiser Westside Medical Center is a hospital in the Tanasbourne neighborhood in Hillsboro in the U.S. state of Oregon. Opened in August 2013 with 126 hospital beds, the Kaiser Permanente facility is planned to later expand to 174 beds. It was designed by Ellerbe Becket Architects and Petersen Kolberg & Associates Architects/Planners. The $220 million hospital includes Kaiser's Sunset Medical Office that opened in 1987 on the west side of the Portland metropolitan area.

== History ==
Kaiser Permanente broke ground on their Sunset Medical Office on 50 acres (20 ha) in what was then unincorporated Washington County in August 1986. The facility, a 41,000-square-foot (3,800 m^{2}) two-story brick building designed by Zimmer Gunsul Frasca Partnership, was built at a cost of $5.2 million and opened in 1987. The organization originally planned to build a hospital on the site in addition to the medical offices. It dropped those plans in the mid-1990s and sold 35 acres (14 ha) of the site to Trammell Crow Company in 1997 for construction of apartments.

In June 2005, Kaiser announced plans to build a 138-bed hospital at the site that had since been annexed by Hillsboro after deciding not to build a hospital in Vancouver, Washington. Kaiser had planned to purchase 53 acres (21 ha) from sportswear maker Nike near Beaverton for construction of a hospital, but Nike backed out after Beaverton planned to annex Nike's headquarters. Hillsboro earlier rejected proposals by Providence Health & Services to build a new hospital in the Orenco section of the city, with Hillsboro-based Tuality Healthcare opposed to the Providence plan due to the proximity to its Tuality Hospital (the only hospital in the city), in downtown Hillsboro. However, Tuality was not opposed to Kaiser's hospital proposal, as it did not view the health maintenance organization's hospital as a direct competitor.

Construction

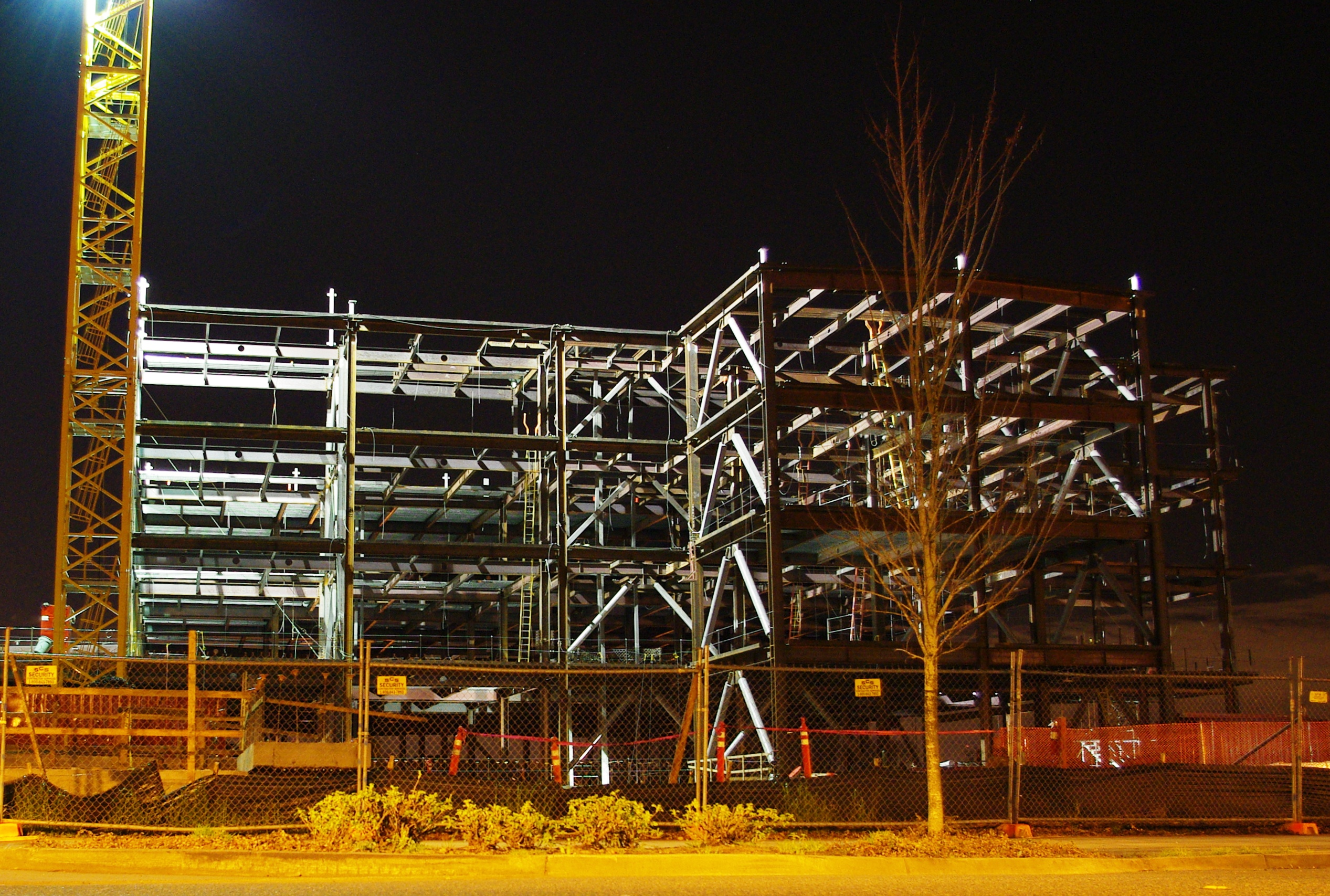
March 2010

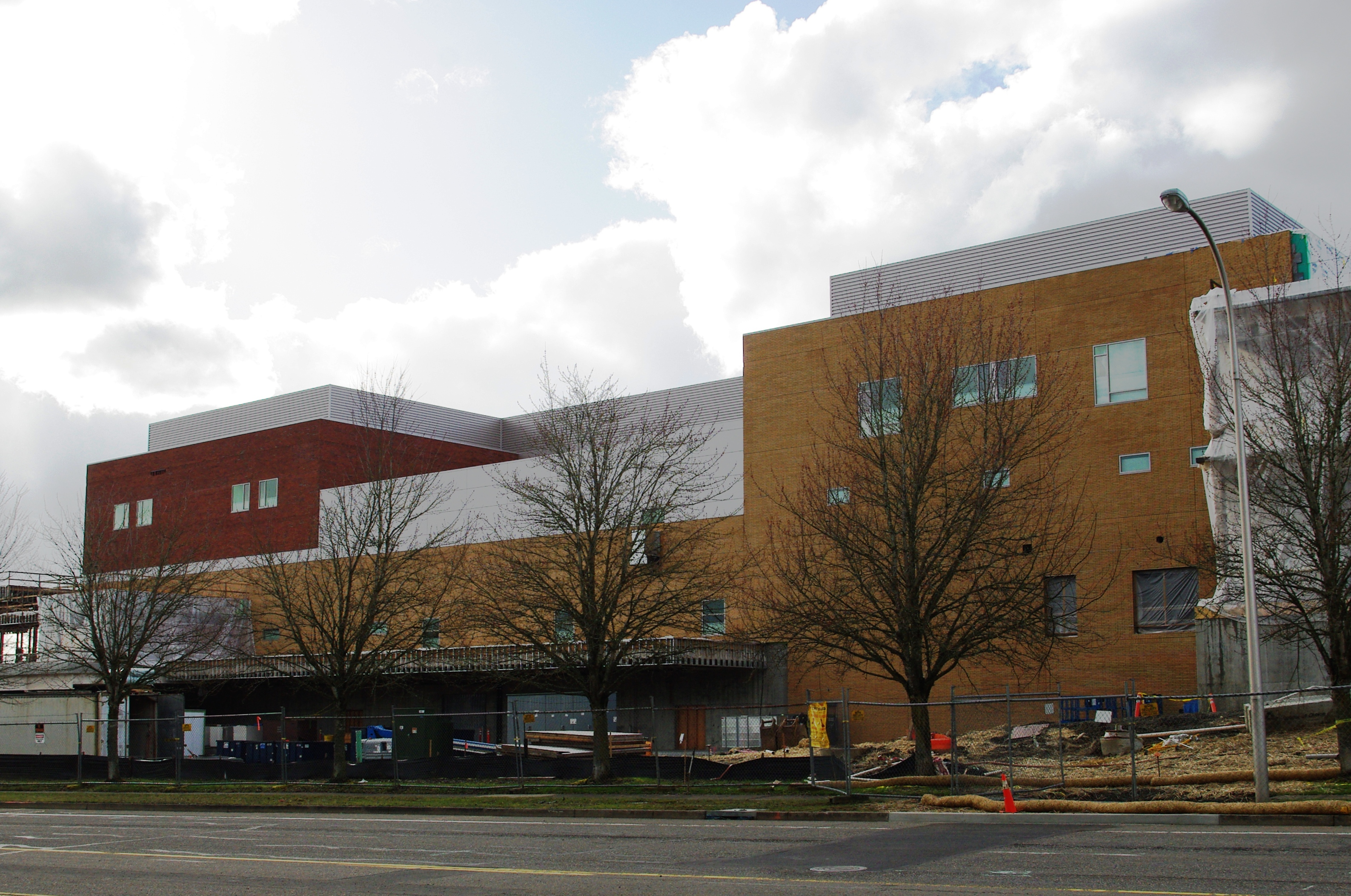
March 2011

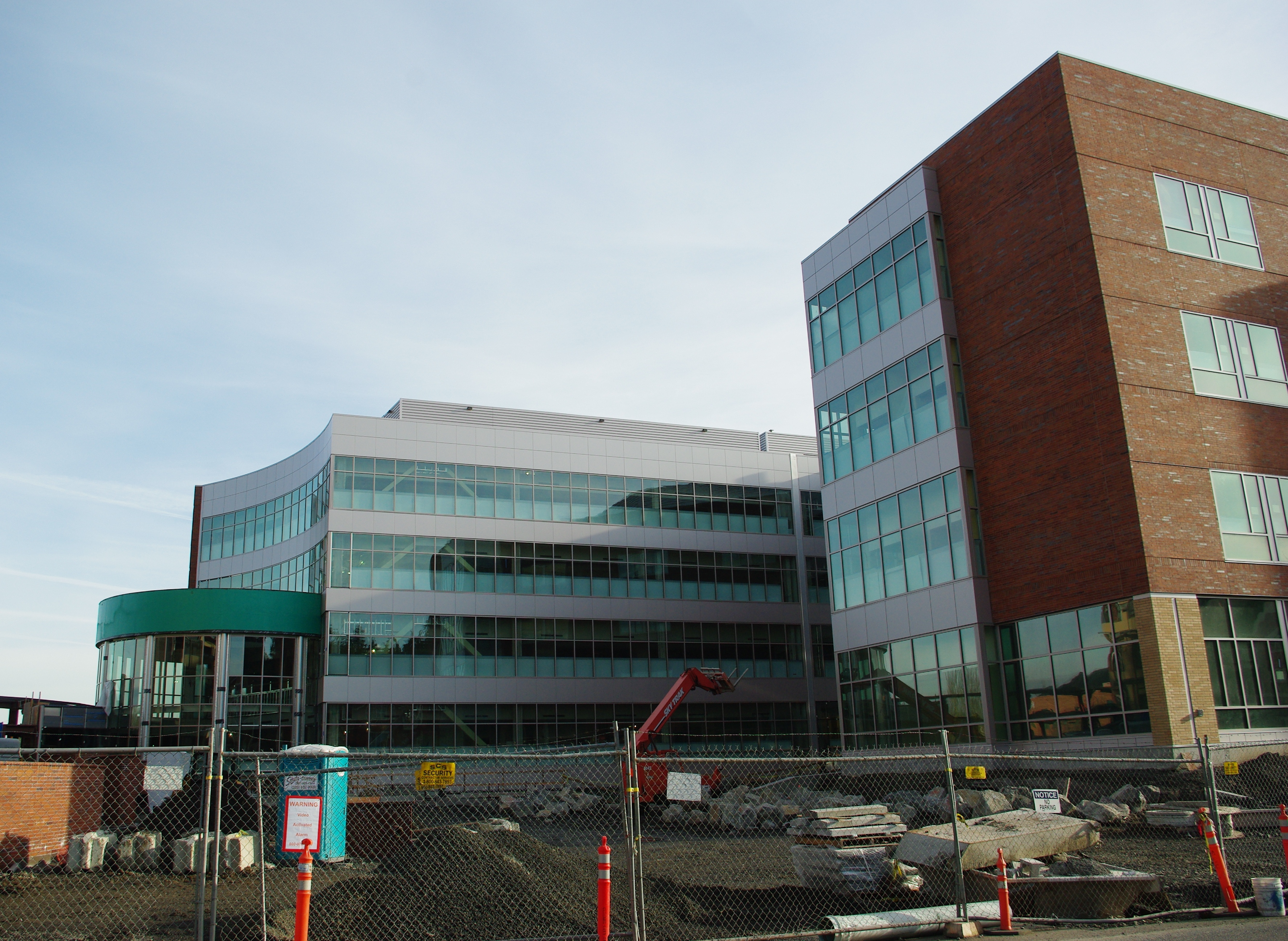
January 2012

The original plans in Hillsboro called for a $285 million facility on which construction would have begun in fall 2006, with opening in spring 2009. Once completed, the first phase was to have 450,000 square feet (42,000 m^{2}) of space, and would grow from an initial 138 beds. The main hospital building, two parking garages, a medical office building, and a hospital support building were to be part of the first phase of construction, with additional buildings and hospital beds to be added later to bring the total size of the campus to 2,000,000 square feet (190,000 m^{2}). The city rejected the initial design plans as too industrial in design and did not grant a request to allow for structures over 90 feet (27 m) in height. Hillsboro's planning commission approved a revised plan in November 2005 that included one building planned to be 93 feet (28 m) tall along with aesthetic improvements to the campus, and the city council approved the plans the following month. Kaiser would also be responsible for some infrastructure improvements in the Tanasbourne area to mitigate the increased traffic generated by the hospital complex.

In 2006, competitors Legacy Health Systems and Providence, both of whom operate hospital networks in the Portland metropolitan area, opposed the project and attempted to have the state not issue a certificate of need required to build a hospital in Oregon. After public hearings and arguments by both sides, Kaiser was issued the certificate of need in January 2007, but pushed back the opening to 2010.

In September 2007, Kaiser decided to review its plans for the project and put the hospital on hold. Kaiser worked to redesign the hospital and in September 2008 announced that construction of the facility would begin in 2009. The new design called for an initial 121 beds and grow to 174 at an estimated cost of $285 million. Hillsboro approved the new plans for a smaller hospital in February 2009, with Kaiser to begin construction in June 2009. The new plans would have the $242 million hospital open in 2013 with 126 hospital beds on a campus of 850,000 square feet (79,000 m^{2}), with full build out on the site to be completed by 2040.

On June 17, 2009, construction began with a groundbreaking ceremony attended by local dignitaries including Hillsboro mayor Jerry Willey and Oregon Governor Ted Kulongoski. After excavation during the summer, construction of the steel-and-concrete frame began in 2010. As of August 2010, completion was scheduled for spring 2012, with construction costs totaling $220 million out of a total cost of $360 million. Kaiser announced in April 2012 that construction would end in summer 2012 and the hospital would open in August 2013 at a cost of $344 million. The facility held open houses in May 2013 and set the opening date as August 6, 2013. In May 2013, the hospital was certified as a Leadership in Energy and Environmental Design Gold building. The hospital opened on the scheduled opening day.

== Design ==
Located on Evergreen Parkway at Stucki Avenue just west of 185th Avenue, the medical center includes Kaiser's Sunset Medical Office in the Tanasbourne neighborhood. The facility is expected to employ about 1,100 people. The facility was the first new hospital in Washington County in almost 40 years. The designs and artwork incorporate modern theories of creating an environment that is pleasing to assist in the healing process, which includes an exterior plaza that can host a farmer's market. Certified as LEED Gold, the medical center's green features include water retention tanks, wood composite insulation, and renewable energy, among others, at the $344 million hospital.

Ellerbe Becket Architects and Petersen Kolberg & Associates Architects/Planners designed the facility and Andersen Construction was the general contractor. The design of the hospital included templated floor plans that re-used existing interior designs employed at other Kaiser hospitals, which helped reduce costs. Unlike many California-based Kaiser facilities, the Westside Medical Center has a brick-and-glass exterior, and a more extensive waterproofing system underground.

The hospital opened with 126 hospital beds in a 280,000-square-foot (26,000 m^{2}) building, but is planned to expand to 174 beds inside a 728,400-square-foot (67,670 m^{2}) facility. This expansion will be accomplished with a planned construction of a second patient tower. The second tower will also be triangular in shape and connected to the main hospital building. The main hospital building is in the middle portion of the southern half of the campus, with the first patient tower to the west along 194th Terrace. The first parking structure is also on that street, north of the patient tower, while the central utility plant is in the southeast corner.

When all phases are completed, the campus will include a nearly 550,000-square-foot (51,000 m^{2}) parking structure and two other buildings totaling 262,000 square feet (24,300 m^{2}) with the campus covering over 1,500,000 square feet (140,000 m^{2}) on the 15-acre (6.1 ha) site. Departments include surgery, intensive care, emergency, labor and delivery, neurology, orthopedics, cardiology, and allergy. The campus also includes a public health resource center and a pharmacy.

== See also ==
- Bess Kaiser Hospital
- List of hospitals in Oregon
