= PacWest Center =

30-story office skyscraper in Portland, Oregon

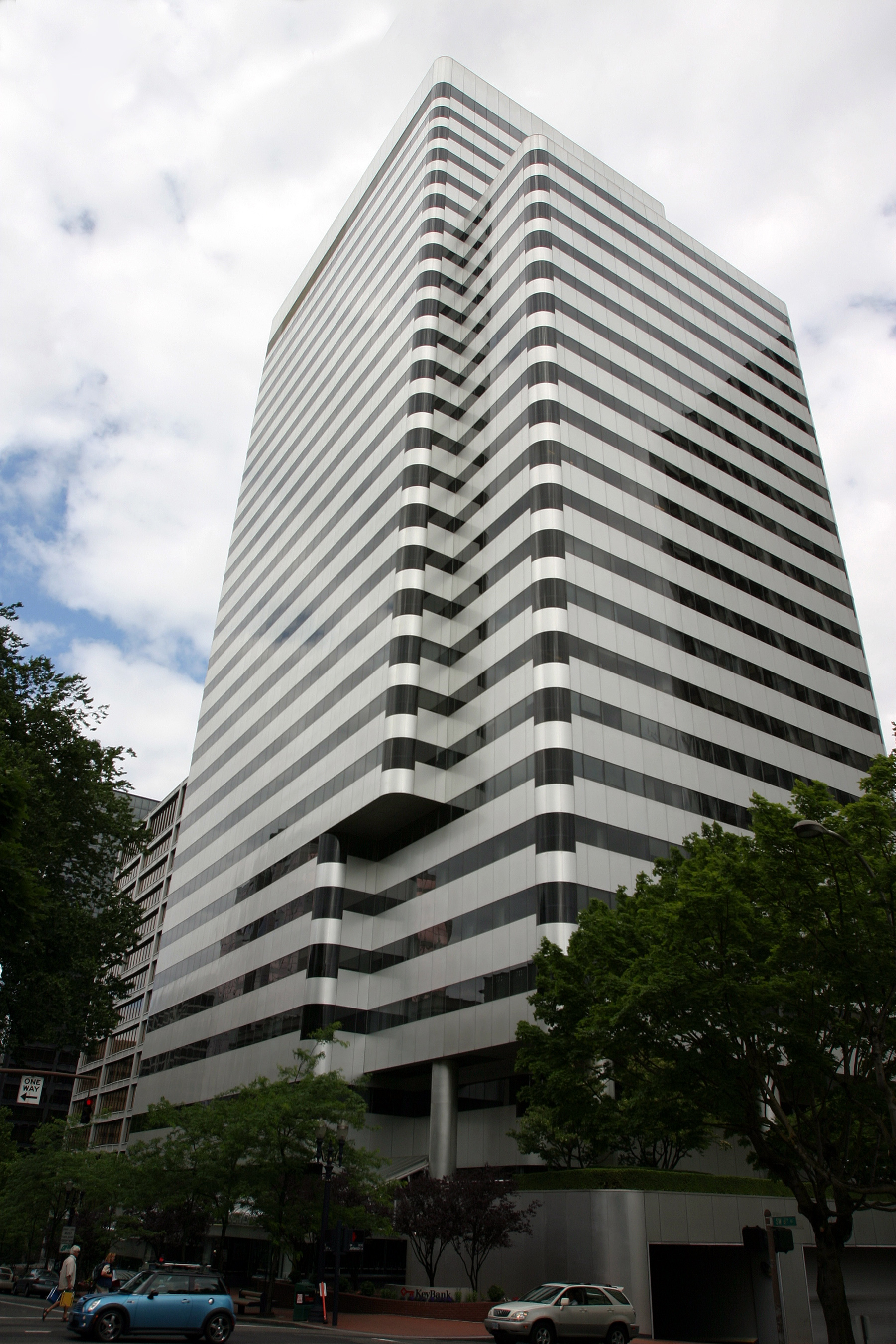

- Location within Portland, Oregon
- Alternative names: KeyBank Tower at PacWest Center

General information
- Type: Commercial offices
- Location: 1211 SW Fifth Avenue; Portland, Oregon
- Coordinates: 45.5153°N 122.6804°W
- Completed: 1984
- Owner: Ashforth Pacific
- Operator: Langley Investment Properties

Height
- Roof: 127.41 m (418.0 ft)

Technical details
- Floor count: 30
- Floor area: 491,528 sq ft (45,664.4 m^{2})
- Lifts/elevators: 14

Design and construction
- Architects: Hugh Stubbins & Associates; Skidmore, Owings & Merrill
- Main contractor: Hoffman Construction Company

PacWest Center is a 30-story, 127.41 m (418.0 ft) office skyscraper in Portland, Oregon. It is the sixth-tallest building in Portland, and the fourth largest with 491,528 sq ft (45,664.4 m^{2}). The building was designed by Hugh Stubbins & Associates of Cambridge, Massachusetts, and completed in 1984.

== History ==
Construction of PacWest Center began in October 1982, and the building was formally dedicated on November 1, 1984. The building's name is derived from former anchor tenant, Pacific Western Bank of Oregon, owned by PacWest Bancorp. However, PacWest's Oregon operations were acquired by KeyCorp in 1986 and became part of KeyBank. Tokyo-based Mitsubishi Estate Co. had been the majority owner in the building since it rose in 1984.

In 1985, the building's design won its architects, Hugh Stubbins & Associates and Skidmore, Owings & Merrill, the year's top "honor award" from the Portland chapter of the American Institute of Architects. The building's lobby was remodeled in 2002. In December 2007 the building was sold to Ashforth Pacific Inc. for $161.5 million. During a windstorm in December 2014 a piece of sheet metal blew off from the tower and damaged the neighboring Standard Plaza. Ashforth sold the PacWest Center in 2016 for $170 million to LPC Realty Advisors I LP. Alaska based Fountainhead Development purchased the tower in October 2025 for $55.7 million. A pine tree located on a balcony on the 25th floor that was planted when the tower was built died in July 2026.

== Details ==
PacWest is the fourth-largest office building in Portland with 491,528 sq ft (45,664.4 m^{2}) of floorspace. The modern, metallic look of the building comes from the use of aluminum panels imported from Japan. It is visually similar to the shorter Metropolitan Park towers in Seattle. The 30-floor, 418-foot office tower was built with a concrete-steel composite. Law firm Schwabe, Williamson & Wyatt is one of the largest tenants, occupying the 17th to 19th floors. The firm has been based in the building since 1984.

== See also ==
- Architecture of Portland, Oregon
- List of tallest buildings in Portland, Oregon
