= Wind Gate =

Sculpture in Portland, Oregon

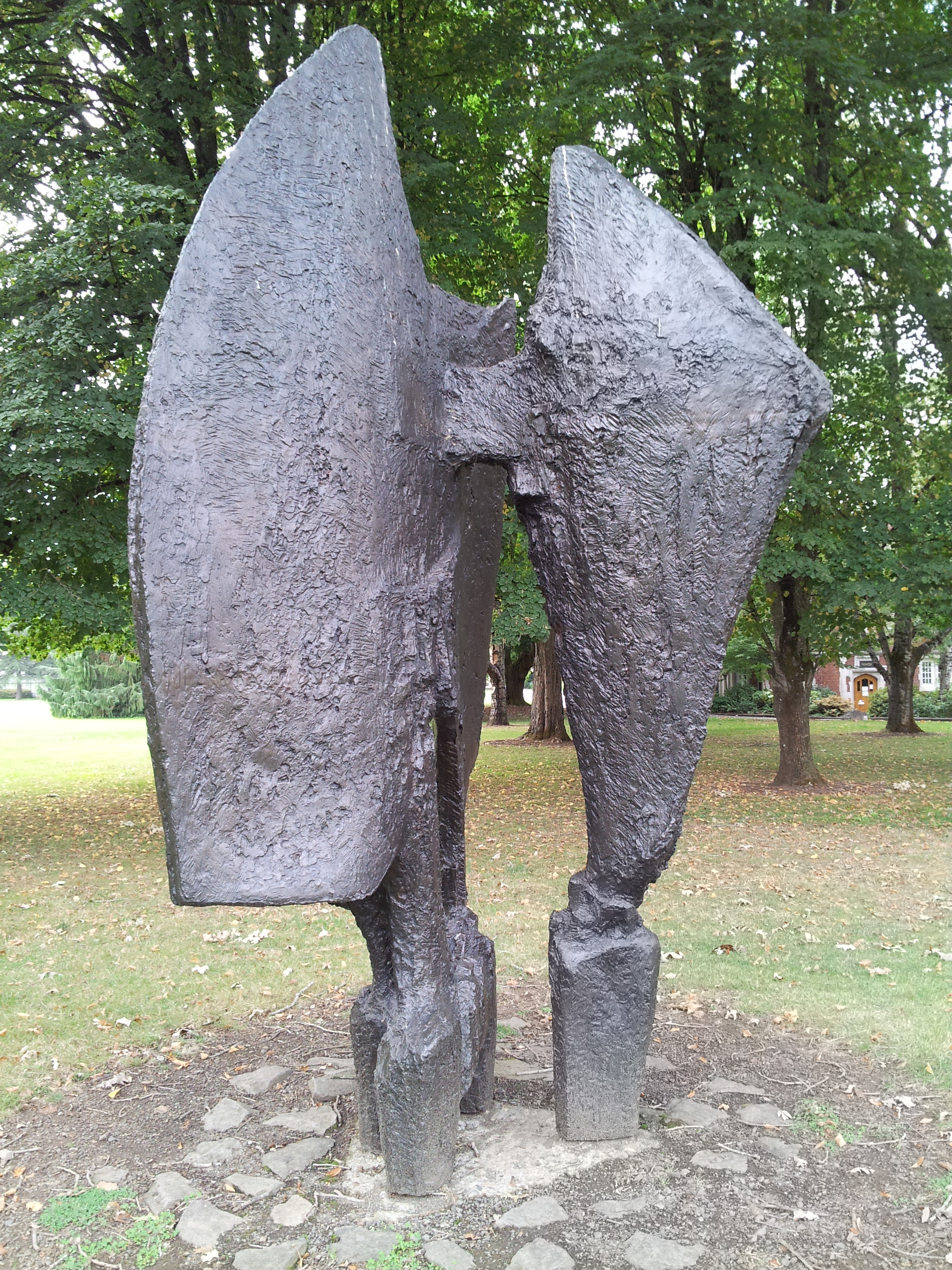
- The sculpture in 2014
- Artist: Hilda Grossman Morris
- Year: 1980
- Type: Sculpture
- Medium: Bronze
- Dimensions: 3.7 m × 2.1 m × 2.1 m (12 ft × 7 ft × 7 ft)
- Condition: "Treatment needed" (1994)
- Location: Portland, Oregon, United States; 45°28′50″N 122°37′50″W
- Owner: Reed College

Wind Gate, also known as Wind Passage and Windgate, is an outdoor bronze sculpture by American artist Hilda Grossman Morris, located in front of Eliot Hall on the Reed College campus in Portland, Oregon, United States. It was created during 1967–1968 and permanently installed on the campus in 1980.

== Description ==
The cast and welded bronze sculpture measures approximately 12 feet (3.7 m) x 7 feet (2.1 m) x 7 feet (2.1 m), marking Morris' largest sculpture up to the time it was completed. The Smithsonian Institution categorizes the work as abstract, allegorical (wind) and architectural (gate). It has been described as "three knife-sail forms that slash through space, radiating out from a central void at roughly equal distances from each other."

== History ==
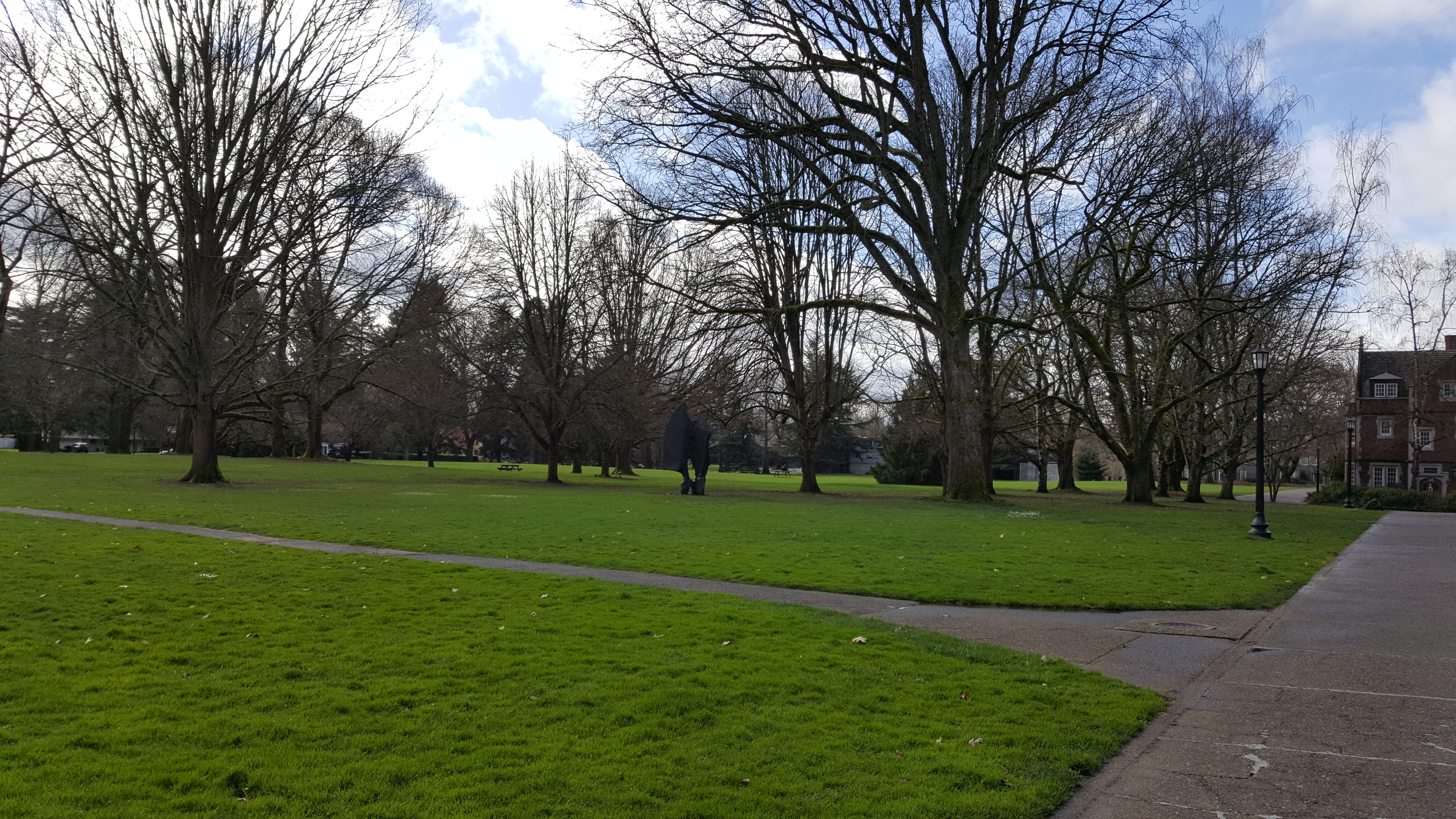
The sculpture is permanently installed on the lawn of Eliot Hall.

Wind Gate took two years to create (1967–1968) and was largely completed in Morris' studio in the Mariana foundry in Pietrasanta, Italy. The piece was installed permanently in 1980 and dedicated at the October exhibition of the Reed Art Associates, called "Hilda Morris: Wind Gate". On October 11, a ceremony was held on the front lawn of Eliot Hall after a reception in the faculty office building gallery. A "process exhibition" showcasing how Morris created Wind Gate was displayed from October 9 to November 11. It featured studies in the form of a bronze maquette and a midstage bronze, original plaster sections, drawings, and pictures of the casting and installation processes.

Financial contributors included Morris, the J.M. Kaplan Fund, Mr. and Mrs. Julian Cheatham, Mr. and Mrs. Alfred Corbett, Mr. and Mrs. C. Girard Davidson, Mrs. Joan Kaplain Davidson, Mr. and Mrs. Paul Feldenheimer, Mrs. and Mrs. Carl Halvorson, Mr. and Mrs. Harold Hirsch, Mr. and Mrs. John Platt, Mr. and Mrs. David Pugh, Mr. and Mrs. Howard Vollum, Mrs. Simeon Reed Winch, the H.A. Andersen Company, Northwest Stone, Skidmore, Owings & Merrill, and the Wilhelm Trucking Company.

According to Scott Sonniksen, then Reed gallery director and associate professor of art, Morris' exhibition marked the last in the faculty office building gallery. He said, "It is quite fitting that she bring to a close the long tradition of fine art exhibitions in the old gallery, because of her long association with the College." The exhibition program was then moved to the college center. The gallery series, of which Morris' exhibition was a part, was supported by the Reed Art Associates, Metropolitan Arts Commission, Oregon Arts Commission and the National Endowment for the Arts.

The sculpture's condition was deemed "treatment needed" by Smithsonian's "Save Outdoor Sculpture!" program in 1994. It is administered by Reed College.

== See also ==
External images
- The sculpture Windgate by Hilda Morris, 1980
- Students on the Great Lawn, 1981
- Student reading on the Great Lawn, 1993
- Students on the Great Lawn, 2010

- 1980 in art
- Architectural sculpture in the United States
