= The Quest (Portland, Oregon) =

Sculpture and fountain in Portland, Oregon

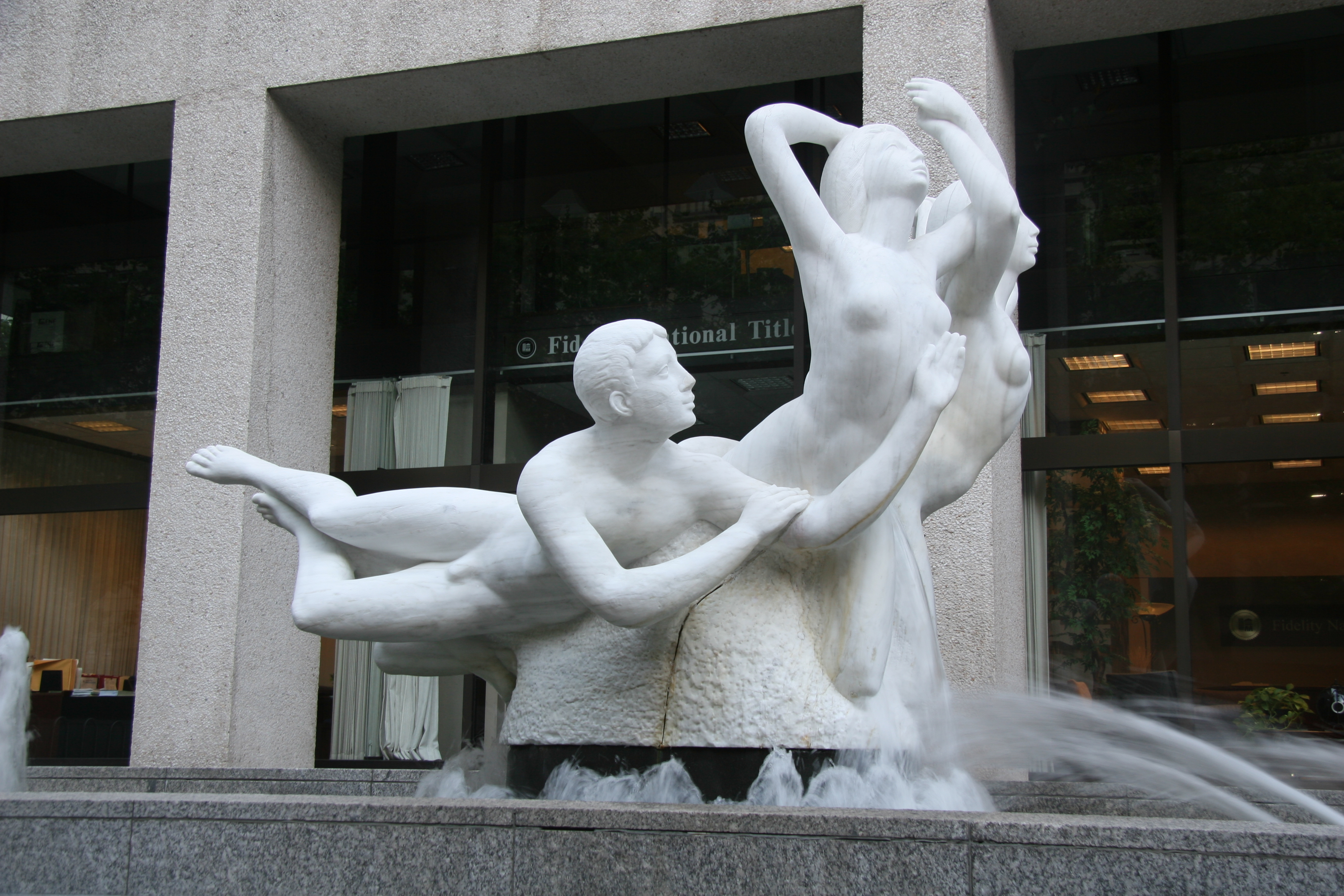
- The sculpture in 2009
- Artist: Alexander von Svoboda
- Year: 1970
- Type: Fountain; sculpture
- Medium: Marble
- Dimensions: 6.1 m × 3.0 m × 4.6 m (20 ft × 10 ft × 15 ft)
- Condition: "Well maintained" (1994)
- Location: Portland, Oregon, United States; 45°31′02″N 122°40′42″W
- Owner: Georgia-Pacific

The Quest, sometimes referred to as Saturday Night at the Y or Three Groins in a Fountain, is an outdoor marble sculpture and fountain designed by Count Alexander von Svoboda, located in Portland, Oregon in the United States. The sculpture, carved in Italy from a single 200-ton block of white Pentelic marble quarried in Greece, was commissioned by Georgia-Pacific in 1967 and installed in front of the Standard Insurance Center in 1970. It depicts five nude figures, including three females, one male and one child. According to the artist, the subjects represent man's eternal search for brotherhood and enlightenment.

As of 1990, The Quest was considered Portland's largest single piece of white sculptured marble. The abstract, figurative sculpture was surveyed by the Smithsonian Institution's "Save Outdoor Sculpture!" program in 1994 and underwent minor repairs. It has received mixed reviews. One critic appreciated how its flowing lines contrasted with the "stark" pillars of the adjacent building, and called the marble "impressive". Another writer for The Oregonian wrote of her and others' dislike for the sculpture, saying it serves as a "free sex-education lesson" for schoolchildren.

== Description ==
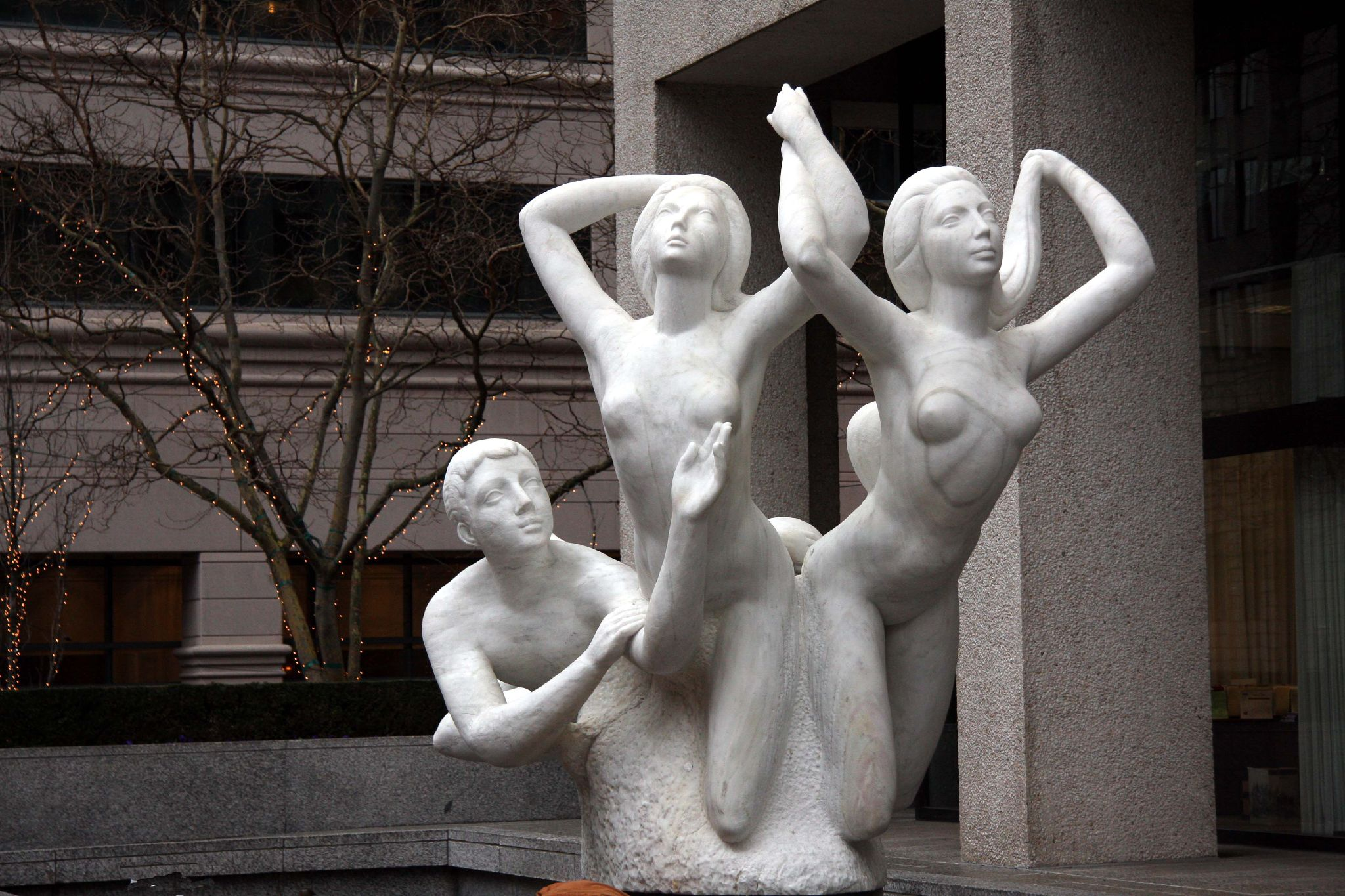
The sculpture in 2007

The Quest was designed by Count Alexander von Svoboda, an Austria-born, Toronto-based sculptor. It was commissioned by Georgia-Pacific in 1967 and installed in front of the Standard Insurance Center (formerly known as the Georgia-Pacific Building) at Southwest 5th Avenue and Southwest Taylor Street in downtown Portland in 1970. The stone sculpture was one of nearly 400 in Georgia-Pacific's private collection, unveiled in Portland with the opening of its world headquarters. Rose Festival princesses presented the work at a formal ceremony.

The sculpture was carved in Carrara, Italy, from a single 200-ton block of white Pentelic marble, quarried near Athens. It depicts five "larger than life" nude figures, including three females, one male and one child. The statue is set on a pedestal within a fountain, surrounded by water jets. The figures' forms curve upward, and two of the females have their hands raised, while the third "sleeps in the rear". The male figure appears to float and is reaching up with both hands, while the child figure is located behind the foremost female.

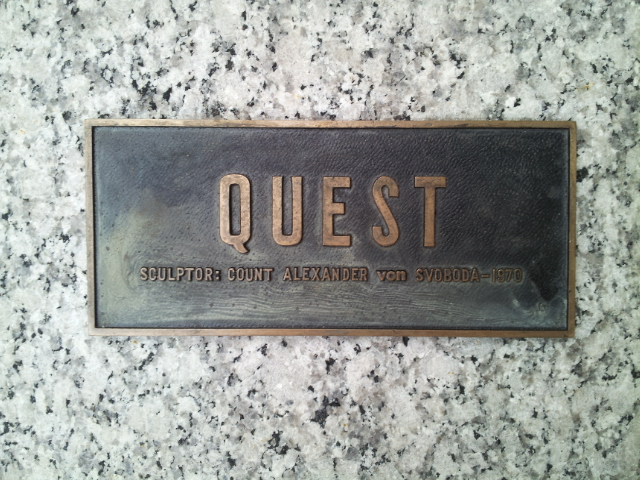
Plaque for The Quest

The Quest measures approximately 20 feet (6.1 m) x 10 feet (3.0 m) x 15 feet (4.6 m) and is sited on a concrete or stone base that measures 22 feet (6.7 m) x 10 feet (3.0 m) x 5 feet (1.5 m) and weighs 17 tons. According to the artist, the sculpture is "symbolic of man's eternal search for brotherhood and enlightenment". Michelangelo inspired the work, but von Svoboda took a more "humanistic" approach, and 35 stonemasons assisted with the sculpture's creation, which took two-and-a-half years to complete. von Svoboda's Perpetuity, a hollowed-out cross-section of a redwood log with a bronze "seedling" radiating outward, served as a "companion" sculpture. Originally installed along the Southwest Fourth Avenue side of the building, the work was relocated to the World Forestry Center.

The Smithsonian Institution has categorized The Quest as both abstract and figurative. In 2002, journalist Sallie Tisdale of The Oregonian described the sculpture as a "large tangle of snow-white bodies in a fountain". She wrote that the work is privately owned but in public view, and that it has been around "long enough that no one is quite sure how it got there in the first place". As of 1990, The Quest was considered Portland's largest single piece of white sculptured marble. It was surveyed and considered "well maintained" by the Smithsonian's "Save Outdoor Sculpture!" program in January 1994. Maintenance on the sculpture has included caulking and repairs to the male figure's nose.

== Reception ==
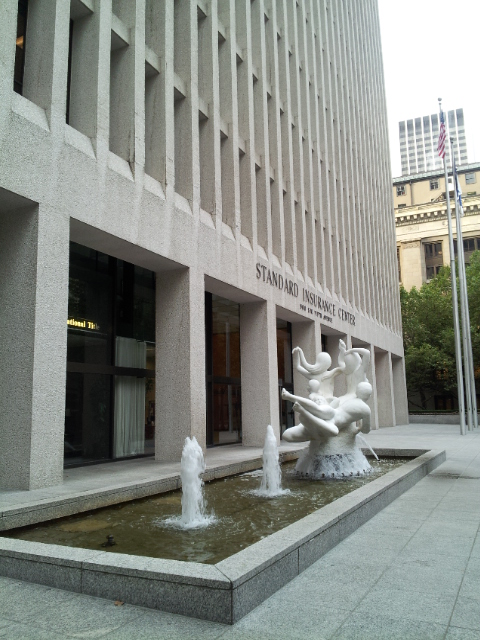
The sculpture was installed in front of the Standard Insurance Center (pictured in 2013) in 1970.

The Quest has received mixed reviews. During the unveiling ceremony, there was reportedly a "momentary stunned silence then crescendo of applause duly recorded by local news media". In 1970, one Building Stone News contributor wrote that the sculpture's flowing white lines contrast with the stark vertical pillars of white quartz on the adjacent building's exterior, and called the marble "impressive". In contrast, Tisdale said of the work:

The Quest has been around since 1970, long enough for its provenance and purpose to sink into mystery ... No one seems to like it much, and others actively dislike it. But there it stays, a free sex-education lesson for busloads of suburban schoolchildren, the uncertain limbs forever reaching somewhere or other, for something.

The sculpture has earned the nicknames Saturday Night at the Y and Three Groins in a Fountain. One writer for The Seattle Times, in a piece about differences between Portland and Seattle, referenced the latter nickname as an example of Portland's "kitschier" art. In 2003, Eugene Weekly published a book review that suggested readers should read Fugitives and Refugees, a recently published travelogue by Chuck Palahniuk, if they were unfamiliar with "Three Groins in the Fountain". Palahniuk includes the sculpture in his "Portland vocabulary lesson", which lists his definitions for local words. The sculpture has been included in at least one published walking tour of Portland.

== See also ==
- 1970 in art
- Depictions of nudity
- History of fountains in the United States
