= Standard Insurance Center =

27-story office building in Portland, Oregon

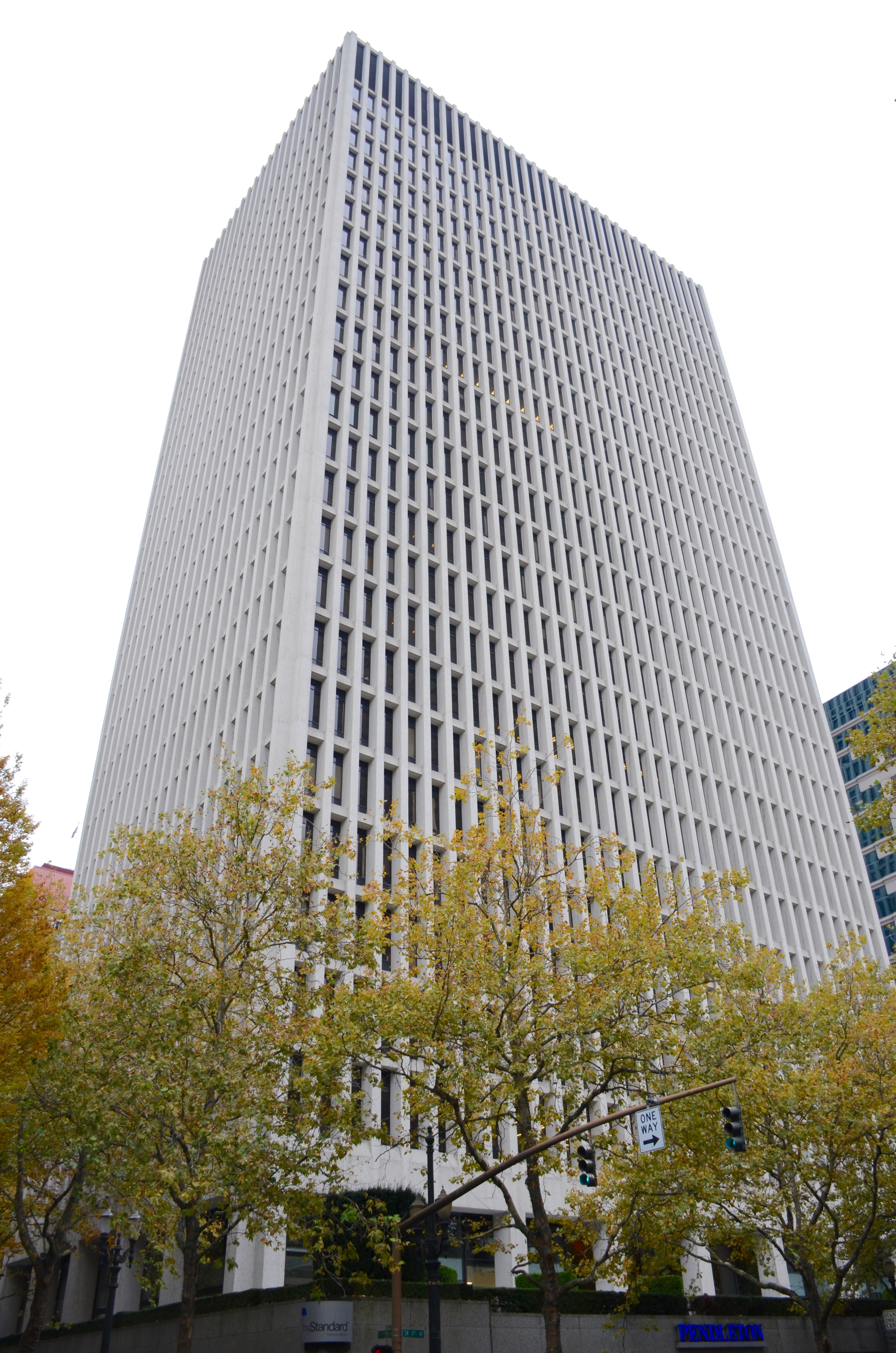
- Viewed from the southeast in 2016

- Location within Portland, Oregon
- Former names: Georgia-Pacific Building

General information
- Status: Completed
- Type: Commercial offices
- Location: 900 SW Fifth Avenue; Portland, Oregon
- Coordinates: 45.5169°N 122.6782°W
- Completed: 1970
- Owner: Standard Insurance Company

Height
- Roof: 111.86 m (367.0 ft)

Technical details
- Floor count: 29
- Floor area: 459,504 sq ft (42,689.3 m^{2})

Design and construction
- Architect: Skidmore, Owings & Merrill
- Structural engineer: Glumac International (consulting)
- Main contractor: Andersen Construction Company

The Standard Insurance Center, originally the Georgia-Pacific Building, is a 27-story office building in Portland, Oregon. Completed in 1970, it is part of the headquarters of The Standard, the brand name under which Standard Insurance Company and other subsidiaries of StanCorp Financial Group, Inc. do business. Standard also owns the 16-story Standard Plaza two blocks south along 5th Avenue.

== History ==
The Georgia-Pacific Building was commissioned by Georgia-Pacific and designed by the firm of Skidmore, Owings & Merrill. At the time of construction, it was the tallest reinforced concrete building in the world. It was completed in 1970.

== Details ==
Standing 367 feet (112 m) tall, the building has 27 above-ground stories. Valued at $114 million, the structure contains 459,504 square feet (42,689.3 m^{2}) of space. Built of concrete and steel, it is considered Modernist in style. One major tenant was the Stoel Rives law firm, which leased the top nine stories of the building until 2016. The Quest, an elaborate sculpture considered Portland’s largest single piece of white sculpted marble, is in front of the building. An untitled chrome sculpture created by local artist Bruce West (artist) is tucked away in the building's basement.

== See also ==
- Architecture of Portland, Oregon
- List of tallest buildings in Portland, Oregon
- The Quest (Portland, Oregon) (1970)
