= Standard Plaza =

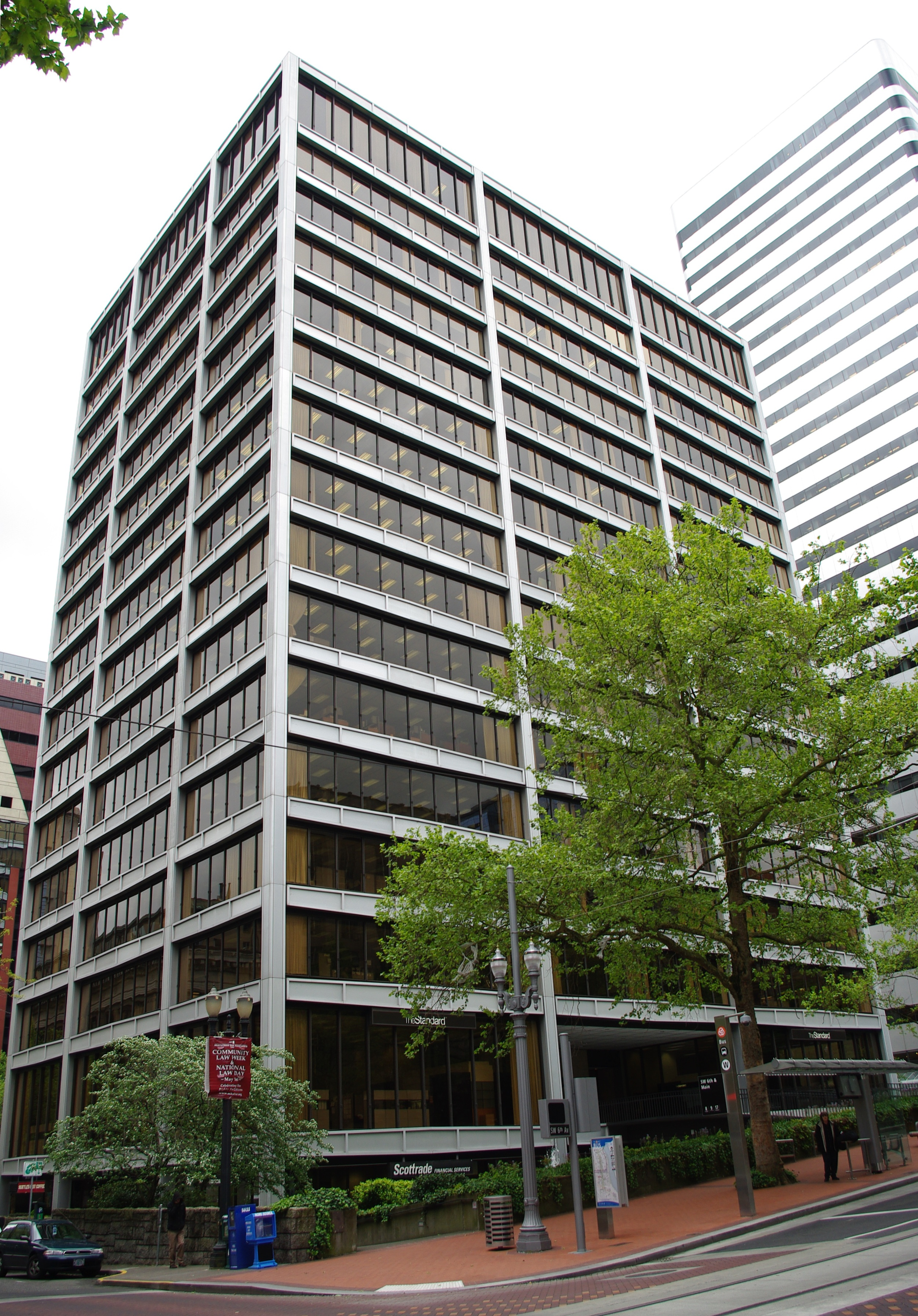

- Location in Portland

General information
- Type: Offices
- Location: 1100 SW 6th Avenue; Portland, Oregon, USA
- Coordinates: 45.516°N 122.6796°W
- Completed: 1963
- Owner: StanCorp Financial Group.

Height
- Roof: 222 ft (68 m)

Technical details
- Floor count: 16
- Floor area: 217,000 ft^{2} (20,200 m^{2})

Design and construction
- Architect: Skidmore, Owings and Merrill
- Main contractor: Andersen - Westfall

Standard Plaza is a 16-story office building in downtown Portland in the U.S. state of Oregon. At 222 feet (68 m) in height, it was the largest office building in Oregon when it was completed in 1963. The 217,000-square-foot (20,200 m^{2}) structure, occupying a city block on SW 6th Avenue between Main Street and Madison Street, is owned by Standard Insurance Company, which also owns the neighboring Standard Insurance Center. It was designed by Skidmore, Owings and Merrill in the international style.

== History ==
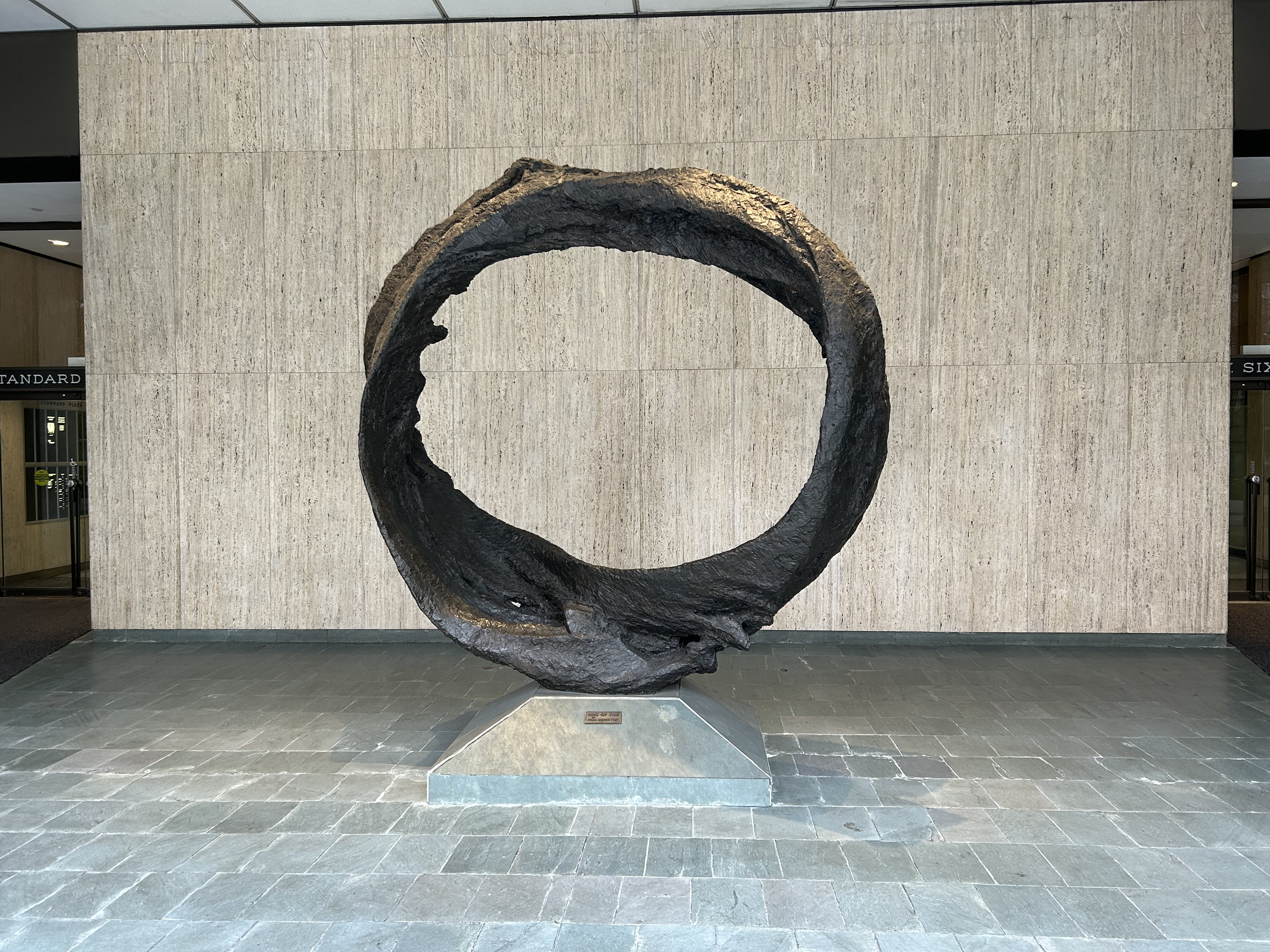
Ring of Time sculpture in front of the building

Construction firm Andersen–Westfall was awarded the contract to build Standard Insurance's new headquarters in March 1961. The bid was for $6.4 million on the project that was expected to cost $8.3 million total. Construction began in 1961, and by January 1962 the superstructure had risen to four stories above ground-level. At that time it was expected that construction would be complete by March 1963.

A strike in June 1962 by the Iron Workers Union halted work on the project, though the strike itself was part of a larger labor dispute between the union and the construction industry dating to May 1962. A similar region-wide strike by the Carpenters Union had paused the project in April 1962, as well. By late 1962 the Standard Plaza was expected to become the second-tallest building in Portland after the Hilton Portland Hotel.

The building opened in June 1963 after a cost of $8.5 million to build. At that time it was the largest office building in the state. Original tenants included Dean Witter & Co., First National Bank of Oregon, Overseas Shipping Company, and the Portland office of Skidmore, Owings & Merrill, among others. Several law firms moved into the building, due to its proximity to the federal and county courthouses.

The building earned a gold rating from the Leadership in Energy and Environmental Design in 2009 after upgrades that included more energy-efficient equipment and low-flow water fixtures. In 2012, three electric vehicle Blink charging stations were added to the building's parking garage. During a windstorm in December 2014, a piece of sheet metal blew from the neighboring PacWest Center and broke out glass on the Standard Plaza.

== Details ==
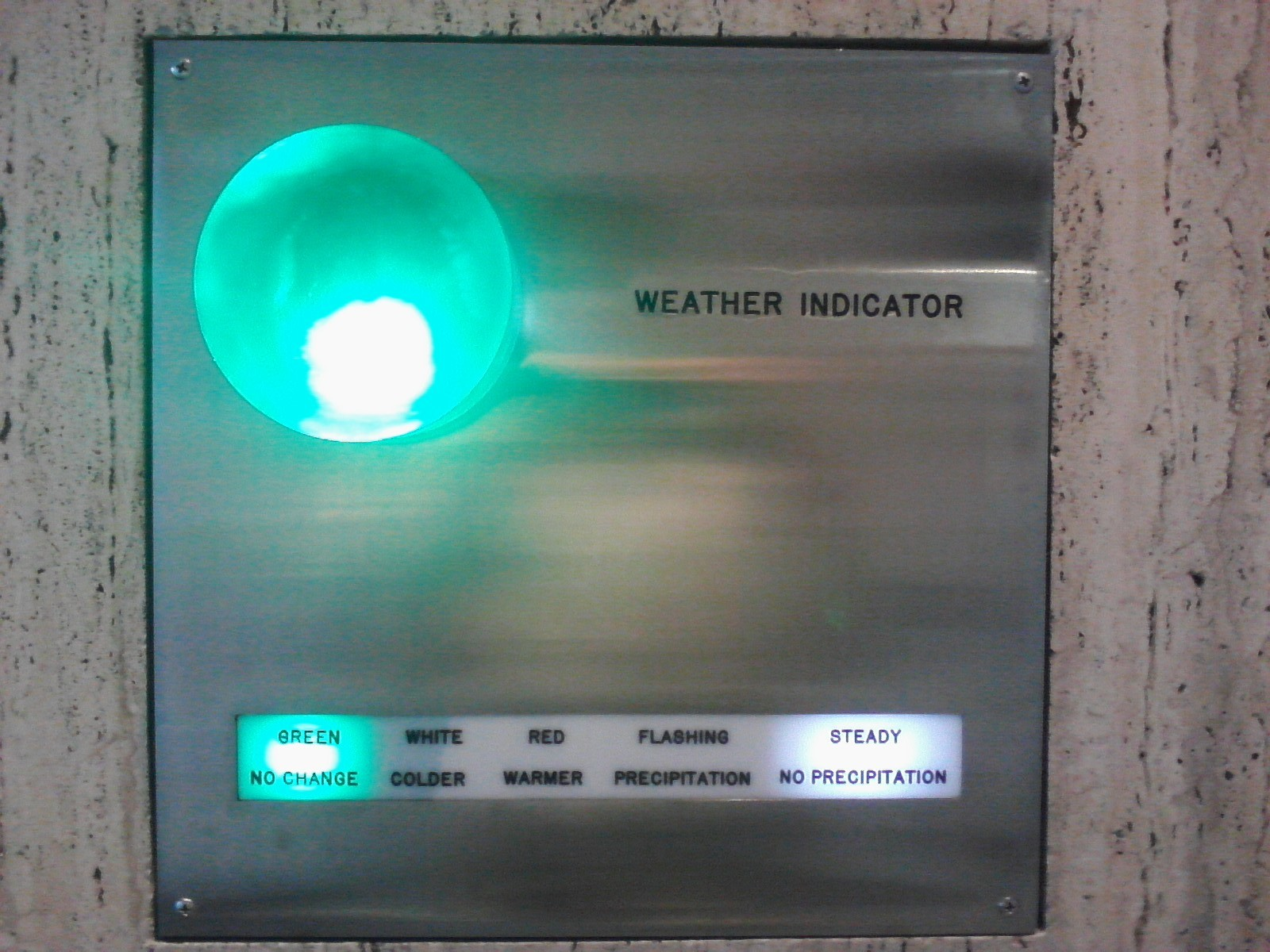
Weather beacon display panel in lobby

Architectural firm Skidmore, Owings and Merrill designed the 222-foot (68 m) international-style structure. Their design incorporated the use of aluminum and glass for the skin of the 16-story high-rise steel and concrete building. The parking garage portion of the building has spaces for 265 vehicles.

The building has a 50-foot-tall (15 m) weather beacon on top for a total height of 275 feet (84 m). The 6-by-5-foot (1.8 m × 1.5 m) beacon glows red if the temperature is forecast to increase by 5 degrees or more, green if the temperature forecast is to be within 5 degrees, or white if the temperature is forecast to decrease 5 degrees. Flashing lights mean precipitation is forecasted and steady indicates dry weather ahead.

Standard Plaza is located in downtown between southwest Fifth and Sixth avenues and Main and Madison streets. Neighboring buildings to the 217,000-square-foot (20,200 m^{2}) high-rise include the PacWest Center to the south, the Solomon Federal Courthouse to the west, and the Portland Building to the east. The interior of Standard Plaza provides one of the few unobstructed views of the Portlandia sculpture that adorns the Portland Building.

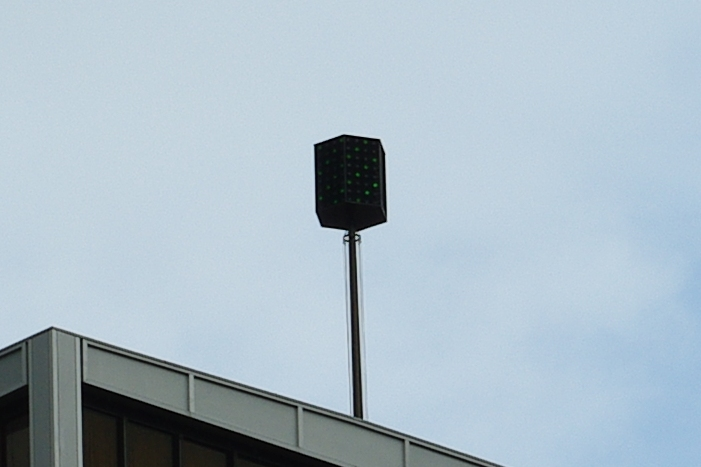
Weather beacon atop Standard Plaza

== See also ==
- Ring of Time (1965–1967)
