= The Streets of Tanasbourne =

Shopping mall in Hillsboro, Oregon, US

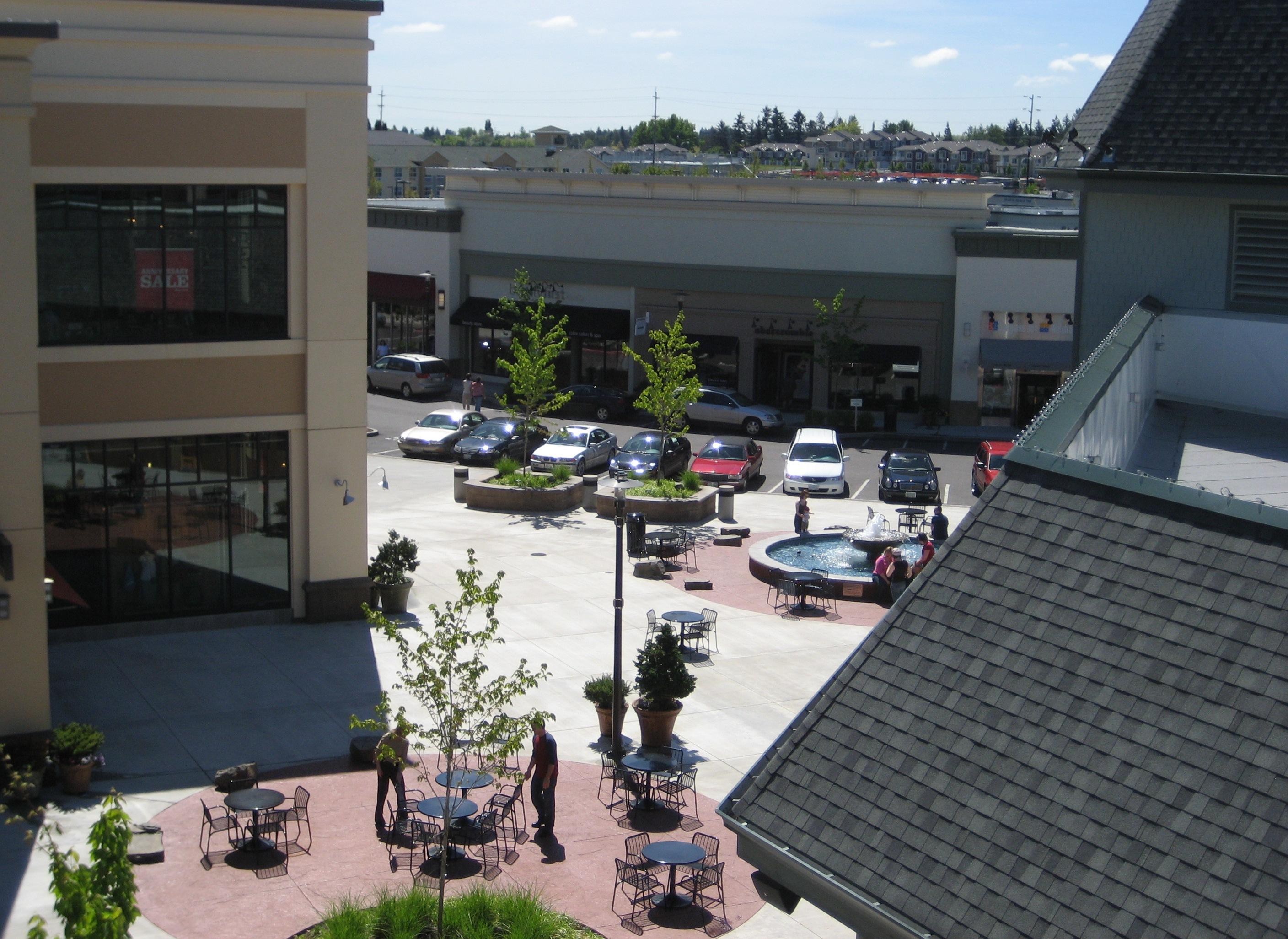
- Location: Hillsboro, Oregon, United States
- Coordinates: 45.536490°N 122.878288°W
- Opened: October 2004
- Developer: Continental Real Estate
- Manager: JLL
- Owner: JLL
- Num. of stores: 55
- Num. of anchor tenants: 1
- Floor area: 368,000 square feet (34,200 m^{2}) (GLA)
- Floors: 1 (2 in Macy's)
- Parking: 1500
- Website: streetsoftanasbourne.com

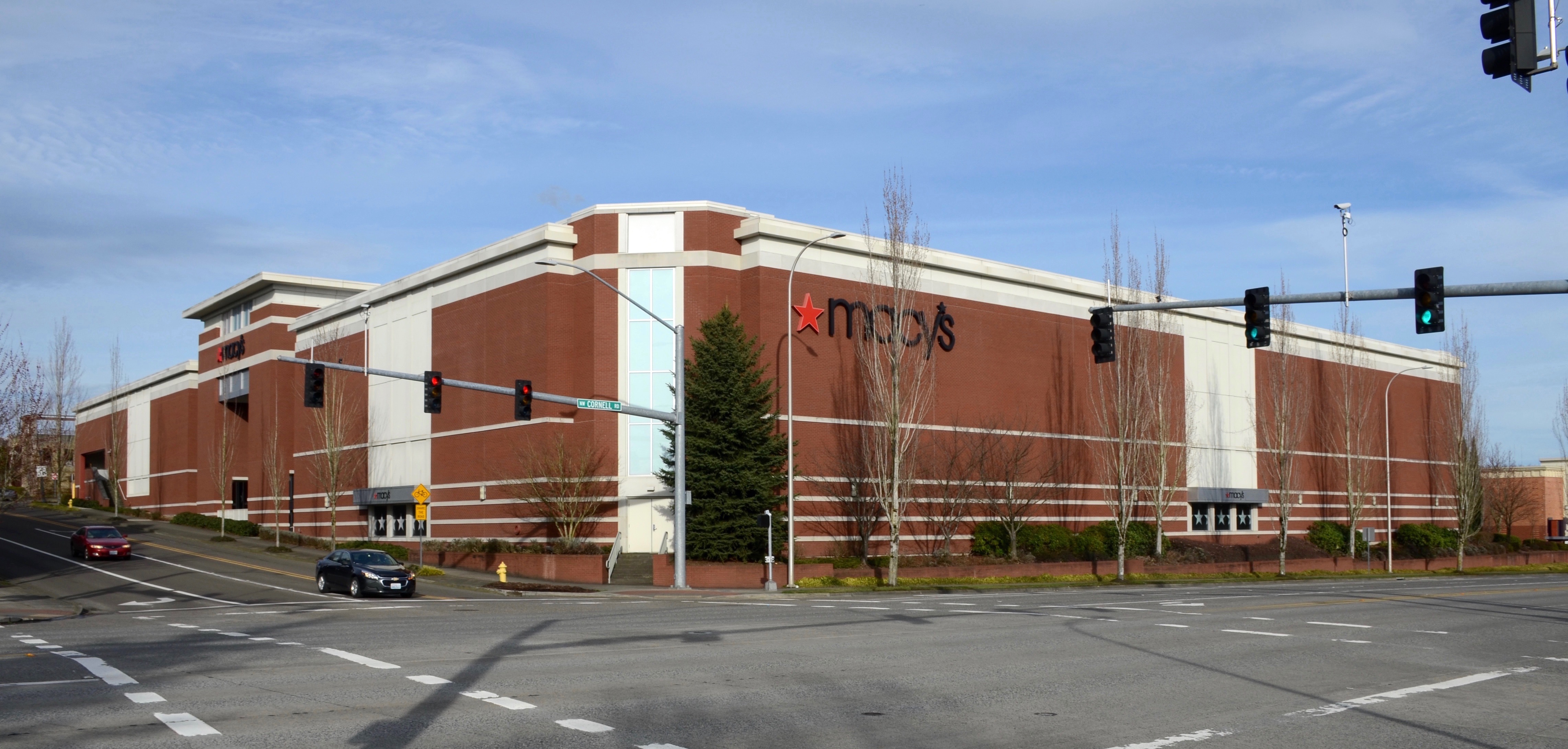
The mall's primary anchor store was this Macy's, originally a Meier & Frank store, until its closure in early 2025.

The Streets of Tanasbourne is an outdoor shopping mall located in the Tanasbourne area of Hillsboro in the U.S. state of Oregon. Opened in October 2004, the center provides shopping to the Hillsboro/Beaverton area west of Portland, near the Sunset Highway. The $55 million center is an open-air complex designed to mimic older downtown shopping districts and has 55 store locations.

== History ==
Plans for a specialty retail center in the Tanasbourne area were originally announced in 1999. The original plan had construction beginning in June 2001 on the project that would have two parking garages. In all, these plans called for a $60 million project on 19 acres (77,000 m^{2}) to open in the summer of 2002. Hillsboro approved the project in 2000, but construction was delayed.

Eventually developed by Continental Real Estate and designed by Field Paoli, The Streets of Tanasbourne cost $55 million to complete. This shopping complex was the last development in a larger Hillsboro project titled Tanasbourne Town Center. Originally The Streets of Tanasbourne were to be named the Shops of Tanasbourne. However, the project's name was changed when Continental Real Estate acquired the project from Federal Realty Investment Trust. Meier & Frank signed up as planned, but very little had been done to attract other tenants by 2002.

Construction on the project began in 2003. The Meier & Frank opened in early October 2004, while other stores finished construction later that month. The grand opening for the 386,000 square feet (35,900 m^{2}) shopping complex was November 6, 2004. The 55-store complex is designed to resemble a standard Main Street style shopping district with open air, free-standing stores complete with parallel parking on the streets within the complex. When it opened it was the first of the lifestyle centers to open in the Portland metropolitan area. Meier & Frank was rebranded as Macy's in September 2006.

In January 2025, Macy's announced that it would be closing its Streets of Tanasbourne store. By the end of March, the store had closed, and a real-estate developer had filed an application to tear down the building and replace it with a six-story apartment building with retail space on the ground floor.

== Details ==
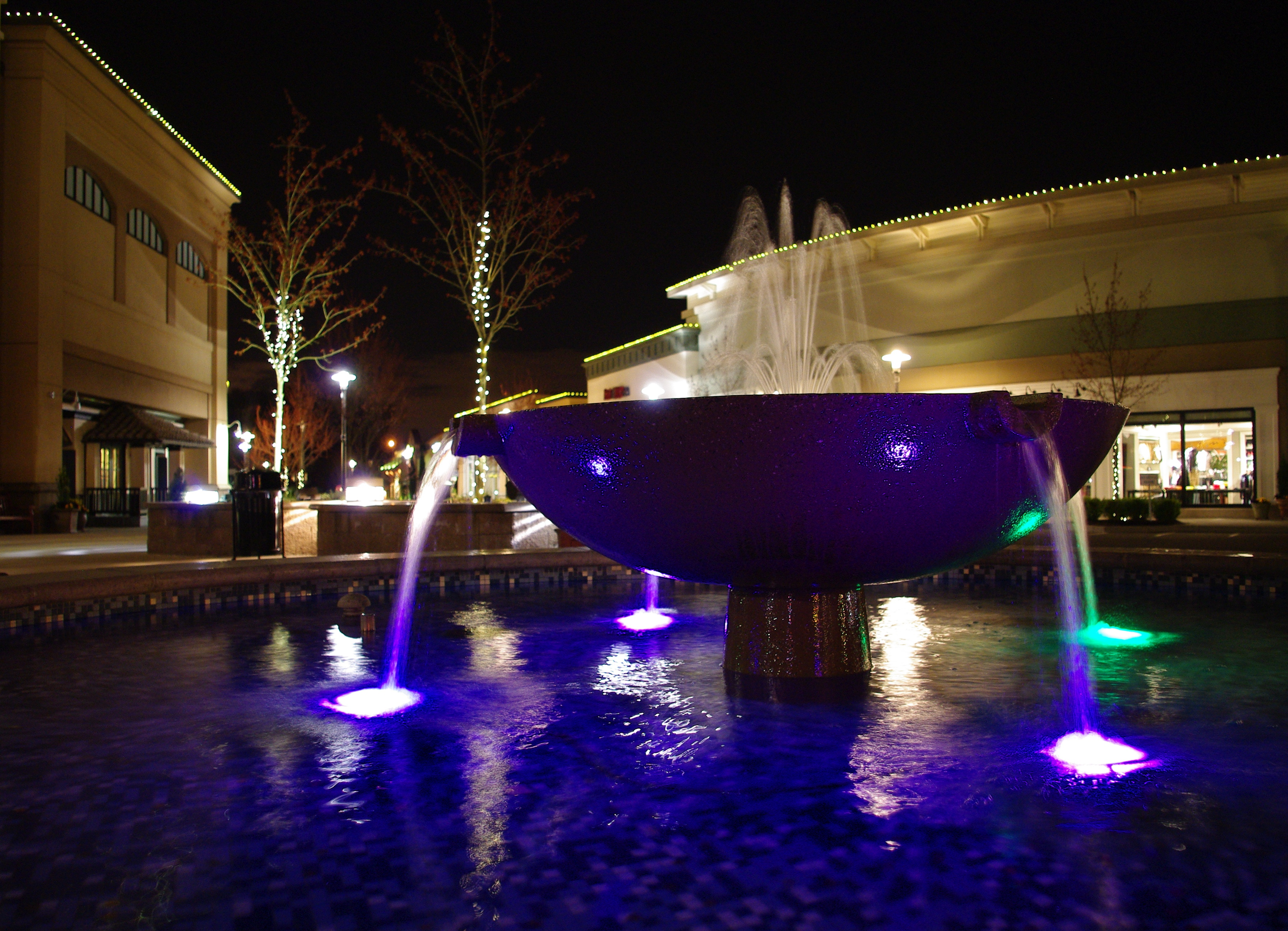
Fountain at the center at night

The shopping center is a 386,000-square-foot (35,900 m^{2}) outdoor lifestyle center. As a lifestyle center, the target customer for the center are upper-income shoppers. Designed to look like Main Street, the center includes retail and restaurants. Retailers include anchor store REI, while restaurants include Buffalo Wild Wings and P. F. Chang's, among others. While not situated along a highway or MAX Light Rail, the center was estimated to have approximately 225,000 people within five miles in 2005. An apartment complex abuts the shopping center on the west. The Streets of Tanasbourne had 49 tenants as of March 2010.

== See also ==
- List of shopping malls in Oregon
