= Standard Insurance Company =

American insurance company

- Company type: Subsidiary
- Industry: Insurance & Finance
- Founded: 1906; 120 years ago
- Founder: Leo Samuel
- Headquarters: Portland, Oregon, USA
- Key people: J. Gregory Ness, Executive Chair of the Board
- Number of employees: 3400
- Website: www.standard.com

Standard Insurance Company, also branded as The Standard, is an American insurance and financial company which is a subsidiary of StanCorp Financial Group, headquartered in Portland, Oregon. On July 23, 2015, Meiji Yasuda, a Japanese mutual insurance group, made an offer to purchase Stancorp Financial for $5 billion. The transaction was completed in the first quarter of 2016.

The Standard covers 8.5 million people (June 30, 2008) in the USA through and out of above 30,000 employers with group and individual disability insurance, group life, AD&D and dental insurance, retirement plans products and services, individual annuities. It is licensed in 49 states and Washington, DC. In New York it has Standard Life Insurance Company of New York. The average loan-to-value ratio on new loans was 64 percent in 2008. Standard Insurance Company has maintained an “A” rating or higher from A.M. Best Company since 1928. Assets $14.56 billion (March 31, 2009). 3,400 employees in 2008. In December 2005 revenue was $2,147,500,000.

On February 24, 1906 Leo Samuel, a German immigrant, founded the Oregon Life Insurance Company. In 1946 the company name was changed to Standard Insurance Company.

In 2006, on a 100th anniversary celebration the company launched The Standard Charitable Foundation with emphasis on helping individuals and families who have experienced a loss or setback such as a major disability or the loss of a loved one.

In 2016, Standard Insurance settled a 2012 class action lawsuit in federal court naming Standard Insurance and New Mexico's General Services Division as defendants in response to denied claims after the death of the covered employee. The settlement of $2.4 million provides between $5.06 - $42.05 to the 74,505 public employees who paid for life insurance coverage through their state employment.

Standard's headquarters in Portland are located in the Standard Insurance Center. The company also has offices in Standard Plaza. It owns both buildings.
