= Annie's Donuts =

Doughnut shop in Portland, Oregon, U.S.

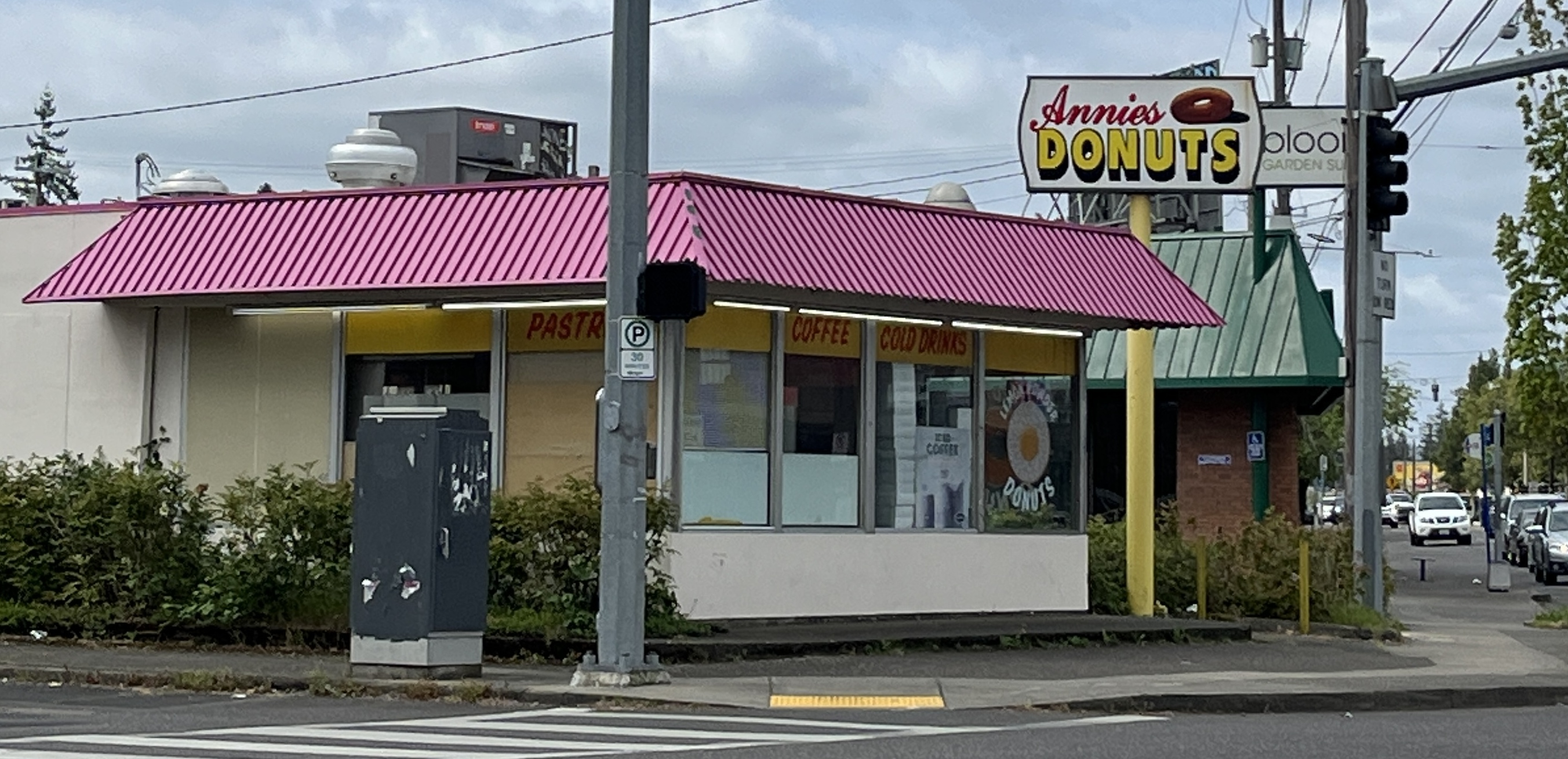
- The shop's exterior, 2025
- Interactive map of Annie's Donuts

Restaurant information
- Established: 1988
- Location: 3449 Northeast 72nd Avenue, Portland, Multnomah, Oregon, 97213, United States
- Coordinates: 45.5481°N 122.5891°W

Annie's Donuts, also known as Annie's Donut Shop, is a doughnut shop in Portland, Oregon, United States.

== Description ==
Annie's Donuts operates at the intersection of 72nd Avenue, Fremont Street, and Sandy Boulevard in northeast Portland's Roseway neighborhood. According to Eater Portland, the family-operated, "diner-like" shop has a "nostalgic" interior reminiscent of the 1950s. Doughnut varieties include old-fashioned, devil's food cake, and the Butterfly, which has chocolate and peanut butter. Other pastries include chocolate-covered and custard-filled bismarks, buttermilk bars, cream cheese flips, cruellers, apple and raspberry fritters, and a whipped cream puff. Annie's also sells donut holes.

== History ==
Annie's was established in 1988.

== Reception ==
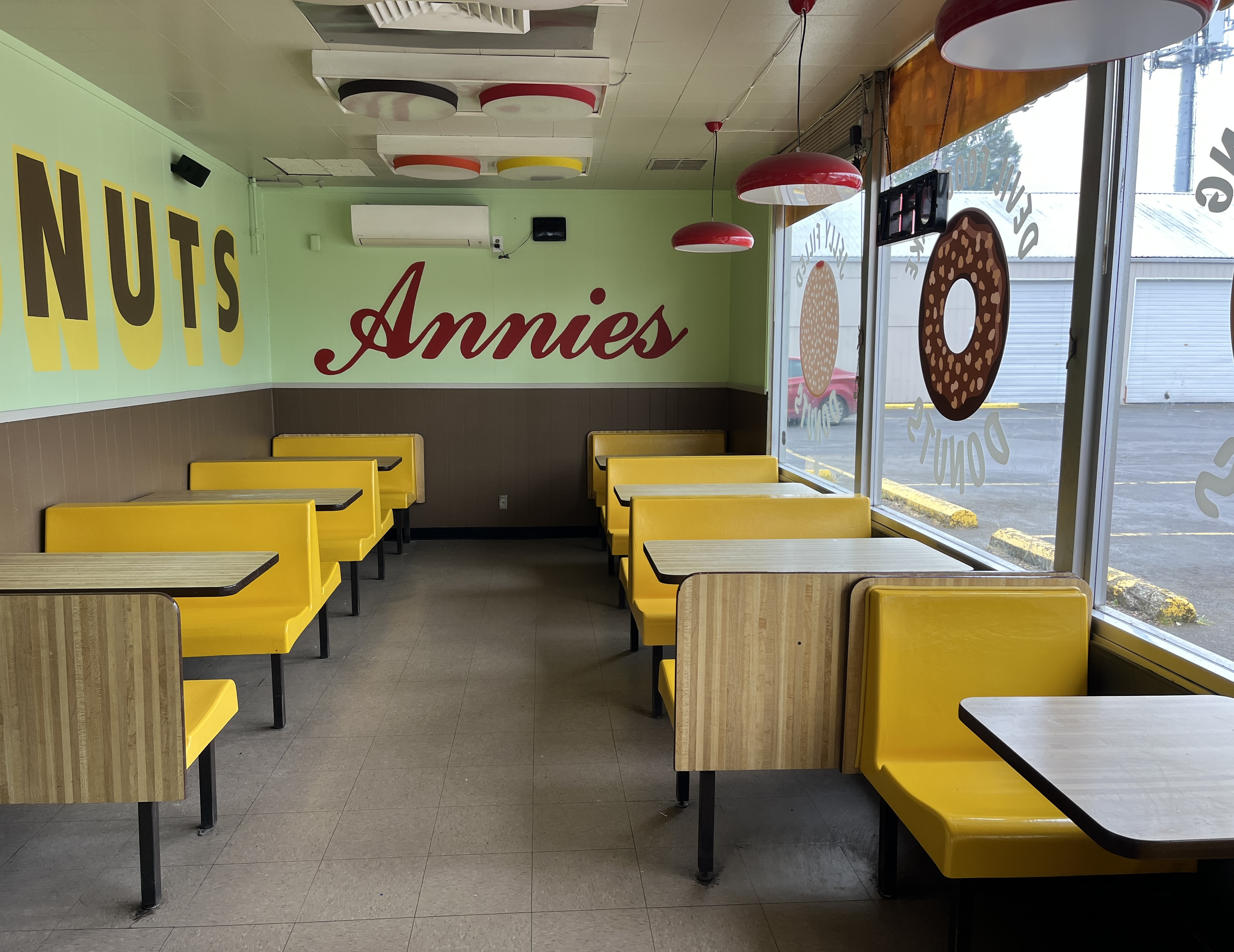
The shop's interior in 2025

Michael Russell ranked Annie's eighth overall in The Oregonian's 2018 overview of Portland's best doughnut shops. The business was included in Time Out Portland's 2019 list of the city's twelve best doughnuts. Janey Wong included Annie's in Eater Portland's 2023 list of twelve "remarkable" restaurants in Roseway and Rose City Park. In the website's 2024 overview of the city's "most delicious" doughnuts, writers described Annie's as a "cult favorite among Portland's classic doughnut purists" and opined: "The pale blonde fry at Annie's highlights the not-too-sweet glazes and toppings. If there's a peanut butter butterfly in the case, grab it before it's gone; it tends to sell out."

Portland Monthly has called the doughnuts "modest and manageable" and said, "while the display case might look a bit drab at first, the glazed or cream-filled doughnuts within are never disappointing: they're what Romantic philosopher Matthew Arnold would call 'sweetness and light.' In other words, everything a culture should strive for." In 2017, Craig Dorfman included the whipped cream puff in the Portland Mercury's overview of the city's best doughnuts and said Annie's had Portland's best maple bar. The shop has also been referenced in biking and walking tours of the city.

== See also ==
- List of doughnut shops
