= North Tabor, Portland, Oregon =

North Tabor Neighborhood
- Neighborhood
- Location in Portland
- Coordinates: 45°31′35″N 122°36′08″W
- Country: United States
- State: Oregon
- City: Portland

Government
  - Association: North Tabor Neighborhood Association
  - Coalition: Southeast Uplift

Area
  - Total: 0.58 sq mi (1.51 km^{2})

Population (2000)
  - Total: 4,701
  - Density: 8,060/sq mi (3,110/km^{2})

Housing
  - No. of households: 2227
  - Occupancy rate: 94% occupied
  - Owner-occupied: 928 households (42%)
  - Renting: 1299 households (58%)
  - Avg. household size: 2.11 persons

North Tabor Neighborhood in Portland, Oregon, United States, is on the east side of the Willamette River on the northern slope of Mount Tabor. The Banfield Expressway (Interstate 84) forms its northern boundary, separating it from the Hollywood District, Rose City Park, and Madison South neighborhoods to the north. NE/SE 44th Avenue separates it from Laurelhurst to the west while NE 68th Avenue separates it from Montavilla to the east. East Burnside Street forms most of the southern boundary (separating it from the Mount Tabor Neighborhood), except for a section west of SE 49th Avenue for which SE Stark Street forms the boundary with the Sunnyside neighborhood.

Providence Portland Medical Center is the neighborhood's largest employer. Government buildings in the neighborhood include the Donald E Long Juvenile Detention Center and the Penumbra Kelly Building, which is used by the Multnomah County Sheriff's Office. The neighborhood has no public school buildings and one private school: the Portland Montessori School, which serves pre-K through 6th grade. The Rosemont Bluff Natural Area is the only public space in the neighborhood.

The NE 60th Avenue station on the Blue Line, Red Line and Green Line of the MAX light rail system is on the boundary with the Rose City Park neighborhood. Buses serve the neighborhood on NE Glisan Street, East Burnside Street, and 60th Avenue. A marked bike route travels east-west on NE Davis and NE Everett Streets, and the 50s Bikeway Project extends through North Tabor.
