= NE 82nd Ave station =

Light rail station in Portland, Oregon, U.S.

NE 82nd Ave
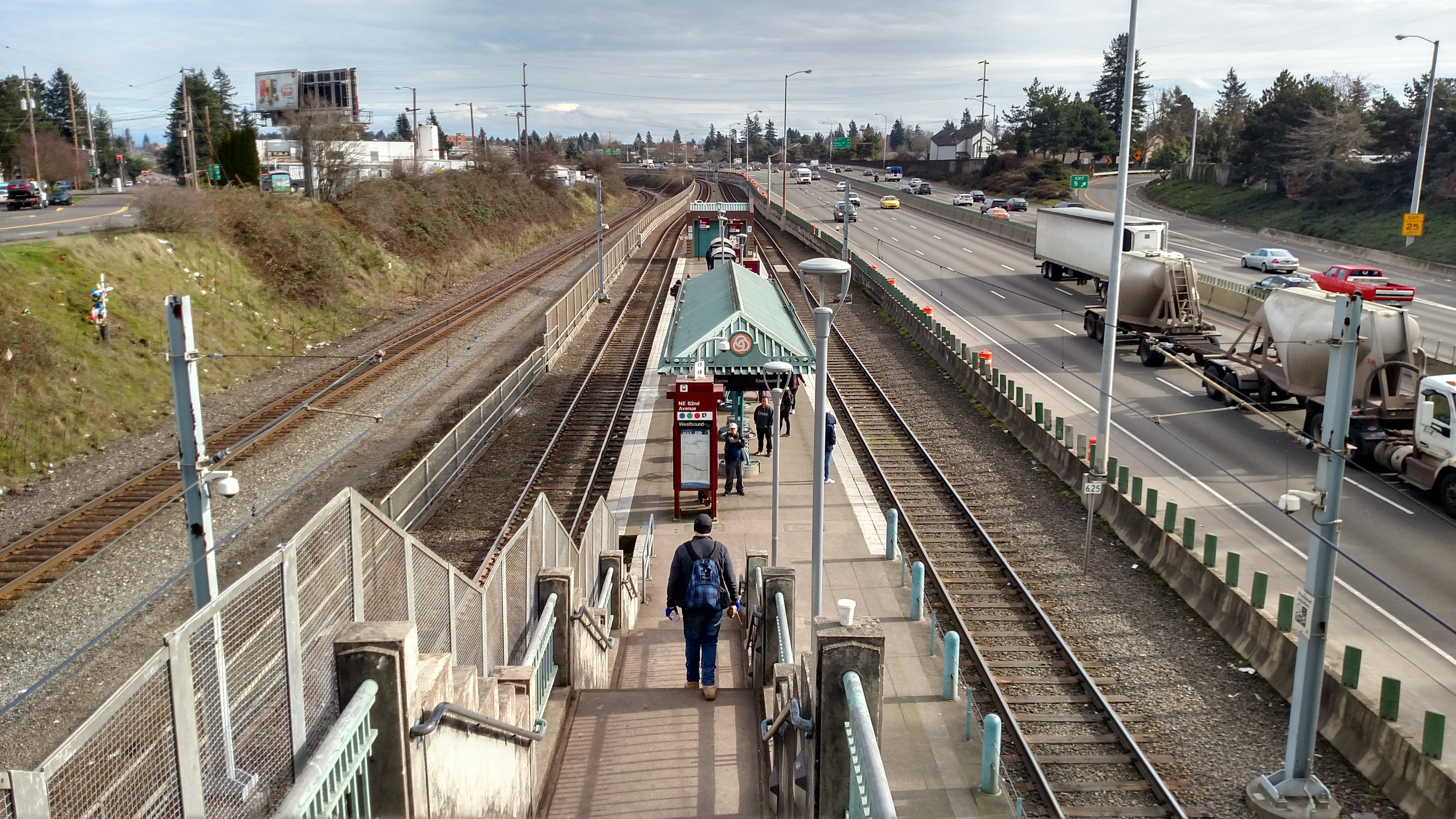
- Steps connect platforms at Banfield Freeway level to NE 82nd Ave on the bridge above.

General information
- Location: NE 82nd Ave on north side of I-84 at Halsey Street; Portland, Oregon; USA
- Coordinates: 45°32′00″N 122°34′42″W
- Owner: TriMet
- Platforms: Island platform
- Tracks: 2
- Connections: TriMet: 72, 77

Construction
- Accessible: yes

History
- Opened: September 5, 1986

Services
Preceding station	TriMet	Following station
NE 60th Ave toward Hatfield Government Center	Blue Line	Gateway/NE 99th Ave Transit Center toward Cleveland Ave
NE 60th Ave toward Hillsboro Airport/Fairgrounds	Red Line	Gateway North toward Portland Airport
NE 60th Ave toward Hillsboro Airport/Fairgrounds	Red Line	Gateway/NE 99th Ave Transit Center One-way operation
Former services
Preceding station	TriMet	Following station
NE 60th Ave toward PSU South/SW 5th & Jackson	Green Line 2009–2026	Gateway/NE 99th Ave Transit Center toward Clackamas Town Center Transit Center
Location

Northeast 82nd Avenue is a light rail station in Portland, Oregon, United States, served by TriMet as part of MAX Light Rail. It is the 32nd station eastbound on the Blue Line and the 28th station eastbound on the Red Line. The station serves the neighborhoods of Rose City Park, Roseway, Madison South, Montavilla and Mount Tabor.

Northeast 82nd Avenue station is at the intersection of Northeast 82nd Avenue and Interstate 84. This station is connected to 82nd Avenue by a stairway and one elevator. Access to the station is from the east side of the 82nd Avenue overpass.

The station was located in TriMet fare zone 2 from its opening in 1986 until September 2012, at which time TriMet discontinued all use of zones in its fare structure.

As of August 2026, the Green Line was cut back to Gateway Transit Center and no longer serves this station.

== History ==
TriMet began a renovation of the station on April 15, 2025.

== Bus line connections ==
This station is served by the following bus lines:

- 72 - Killingsworth/82nd Ave
- 77 - Broadway/Halsey
