= NE 60th Ave station =

Light rail station in Portland, Oregon, U.S.

NE 60th Ave
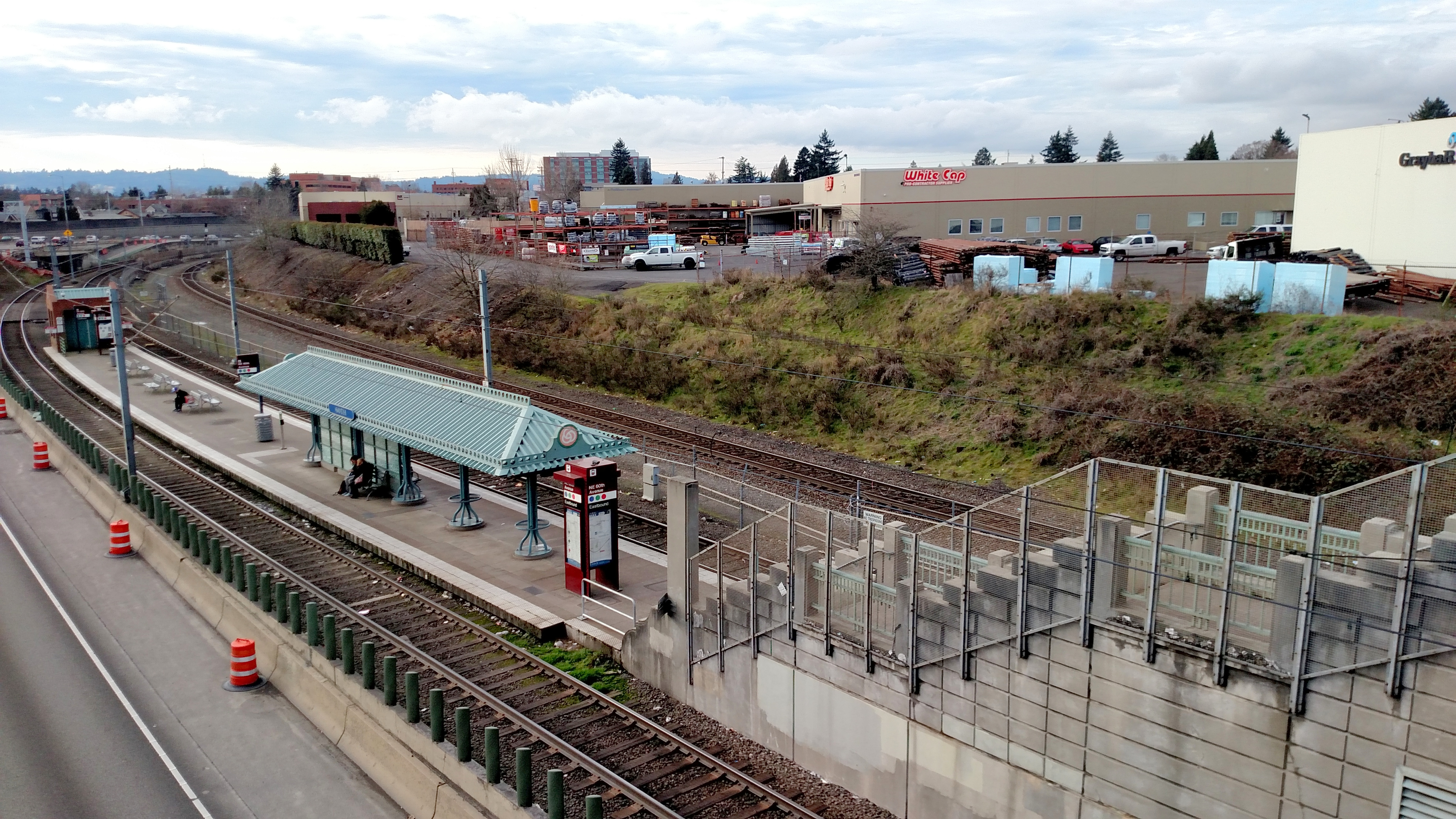
- The station viewed from the viaduct carrying 60th Avenue over the station and the Banfield Freeway

General information
- Location: NE 60th Ave on north side I-84, between Halsey & Glisan; Portland, Oregon; USA
- Coordinates: 45°31′43″N 122°36′11″W
- Owner: TriMet
- Platforms: 1 island platform
- Tracks: 2
- Connections: TriMet: 71

Construction
- Cycle facilities: bike lockers and racks
- Accessible: yes

History
- Opened: September 5, 1986

Services
Preceding station	TriMet	Following station
Hollywood/NE 42nd Ave toward Hatfield Government Center	Blue Line	NE 82nd Ave toward Cleveland Ave
Hollywood/NE 42nd Ave toward Hillsboro Airport/Fairgrounds	Red Line	NE 82nd Ave toward Portland Airport
Former services
Preceding station	TriMet	Following station
Hollywood/NE 42nd Ave toward PSU South/SW 5th & Jackson	Green Line 2009–2026	NE 82nd Ave toward Clackamas Town Center Transit Center
Location

Northeast 60th Avenue is a light rail station on the MAX Blue and Red Lines in Portland, Oregon. It is the 12th stop eastbound on the eastside MAX line. It is located on the boundary between the North Tabor and Rose City Park neighborhoods.

The station is at the intersection of NE 60th Avenue and Interstate 84, located above a Union Pacific line, but below street level. This station is connected to NE 60th Avenue by a series of stairs and elevators. The single island platform is separated from the westbound lanes of the freeway by only a low wall and the eastbound MAX tracks, causing the platform level of this station to be noisy most hours of the day.

The station was located in TriMet fare zone 2 from its opening in 1986 until September 2012, at which time TriMet discontinued all use of zones in its fare structure.

As of August 2026, the Green Line was cut back to Gateway Transit Center and no longer serves this station.

== Bus line connections ==
This station is served by the following bus line:

- 71 - 60th Ave
