= Hollywood/NE 42nd Ave station =

Light rail station in Portland, Oregon, U.S.

Hollywood/NE 42nd Ave
- View of the station from Campesinos Boulevard in 2026, facing east

General information
- Location: 1410 NE 42nd Ave; Portland, Oregon, U.S.
- Coordinates: 45°31′58″N 122°37′15″W
- Owner: TriMet
- Platforms: 1 island platform
- Tracks: 2
- Bus routes: 2
- Connections: TriMet: 75, 77

Construction
- Cycle facilities: bike lockers and banks
- Accessible: yes

Other information
- Status: MAX station open Bus terminal to reopen 2026

History
- Opened: September 5, 1986

Services
Preceding station	TriMet	Following station
Lloyd Center/NE 11th Ave toward Hatfield Government Center	Blue Line	NE 60th Ave toward Cleveland Ave
Lloyd Center/NE 11th Ave toward Hillsboro Airport/Fairgrounds	Red Line	NE 60th Ave toward Portland Airport
Former services
Preceding station	TriMet	Following station
Lloyd Center/NE 11th Ave toward PSU South/SW 5th & Jackson	Green Line 2009–2026	NE 60th Ave toward Clackamas Town Center Transit Center
Location

Hollywood/NE 42nd Ave station, also known as Hollywood Transit Center, is a light rail station in the MAX Light Rail system located in the Hollywood District of Portland, Oregon, United States. Hollywood/NE 42nd Ave is the 11th stop eastbound on the eastside MAX main line, and is served by the Blue and Red Lines. The transit center's bus area, served by two routes, is temporarily closed for construction.

Owned by TriMet, the transit center is located along the Banfield Freeway, south of the intersection of Northeast 42nd Avenue and Halsey Street. The MAX station platform is situated between the freeway and a Union Pacific Railroad line, and is connected to the bus stops and surrounding areas by a pedestrian bridge.

The station was located in TriMet fare zone 2 from its opening in 1986 until September 2012, at which time TriMet discontinued all use of zones in its fare structure.

In August 2026, the Green Line was cut back to Gateway Transit Center and no longer serves this station.

== Services ==
This transit center is served by the following bus lines. Beginning in August 2023, these lines stop on nearby streets, until construction on the station's new bus plaza is complete.

Route	Destination	Stop location	Stop ID
75–Cesar Chavez/Lombard	St Johns	NE Broadway & 42nd	1440
75–Cesar Chavez/Lombard	Milwaukie	NE 42nd & Halsey	14640
77–Broadway/Halsey	Montgomery Park	NE 42nd & Halsey	14640
77–Broadway/Halsey	Troutdale	NE Halsey & 42nd (Hollywood)	14145

== History ==
=== Opening and service expansion ===
The Hollywood/NE 42nd Ave station and transit center are part of the first MAX line, which was constructed along the Banfield Freeway as an alternative to building the controversial Mount Hood Freeway. The station opened on September 5, 1986, as part of the initial 15.1 mi (24.3 km) MAX service from Gresham to Downtown Portland.

The transit center in 1999, when line 12–Sandy was still serving it

For its first 15 years, the transit center's bus service included line 12–Sandy, which diverted off of Sandy Blvd. to serve the center. In September 2001, line 12 was changed to remain on Sandy Blvd. through the Hollywood District, no longer serving Hollywood TC.

MAX service was extended west of Downtown Portland in the late 1990s, and an extension to Portland International Airport opened in 2001. The airport MAX service opened as the Red Line, and the line to Gresham was redesignated as the Blue Line, both serving Hollywood/NE 42nd. The station gained an additional service in 2009 with the opening of the Green Line to Clackamas Town Center, a service pattern that remained in place until 2026, when the section of the Green Line serving Hollywood was discontinued.

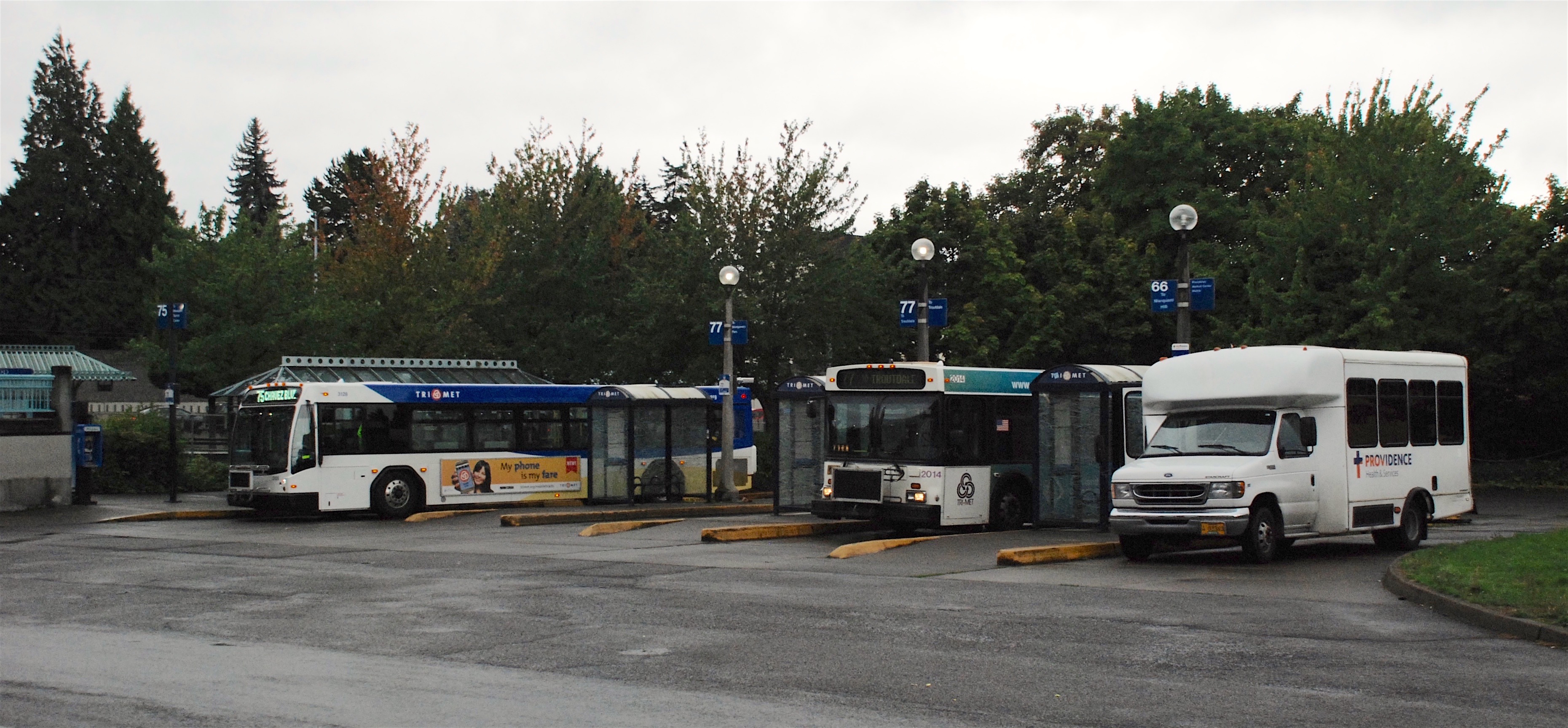
The former bus plaza at the station, shown in 2013. This site is being redeveloped into apartments, to open in 2026.

TriMet renovated the Hollywood/NE 42nd station with new signage, lighting, and information displays, as part of a renovation program that began in 2011. The Blue Line Station Rehabilitation initiative was accompanied by safety improvements along the original Banfield Freeway line, and was funded by a grant from the Federal Transit Administration.

=== 2017 stabbing attack ===
On May 26, 2017, two people were killed and one seriously injured in a knife attack on a train arriving at the Hollywood station. The attacker was verbally abusing two women who he believed were Muslim, and stabbed three bystanders who attempted to intervene. The attacker was arrested nearby, and was sentenced to two consecutive life sentences in June 2020.

In the aftermath of the attack, TriMet commissioned a memorial to commemorate the victims. Sarah Farahat's design, We Choose Love, was completed in May 2018, drawing inspiration from chalk messages left at the scene shortly after the attack. We Choose Love features excerpts from a poem translated into seven languages, and incorporates images of the Western peony throughout its life cycle.

=== Redevelopment ===
Hollywood Transit Center is the site of a new transit-oriented development project, hollywoodHUB, which is stated to open in 2026. The project includes a 12-story apartment building, which will feature over 220 units of affordable housing, retail spaces, and transit connections. TriMet and its partner BRIDGE Housing broke ground at the site in August 2023, moving the station's bus services to temporary stops during the construction. Infrastructure improvements for MAX Light Rail are also planned, including a new traction power substation.

The We Choose Love memorial was removed in January 2024, as part of the hollywoodHUB project. TriMet officials described the mural as temporary when it was installed, citing their upcoming plans for the station's renovation. The rebuilt station will incorporate the themes of the original memorial, including the color scheme and messages of peace.

== See also ==
- List of TriMet transit centers
