= Columbia Area Transit =

Public transit agency in Oregon, United States

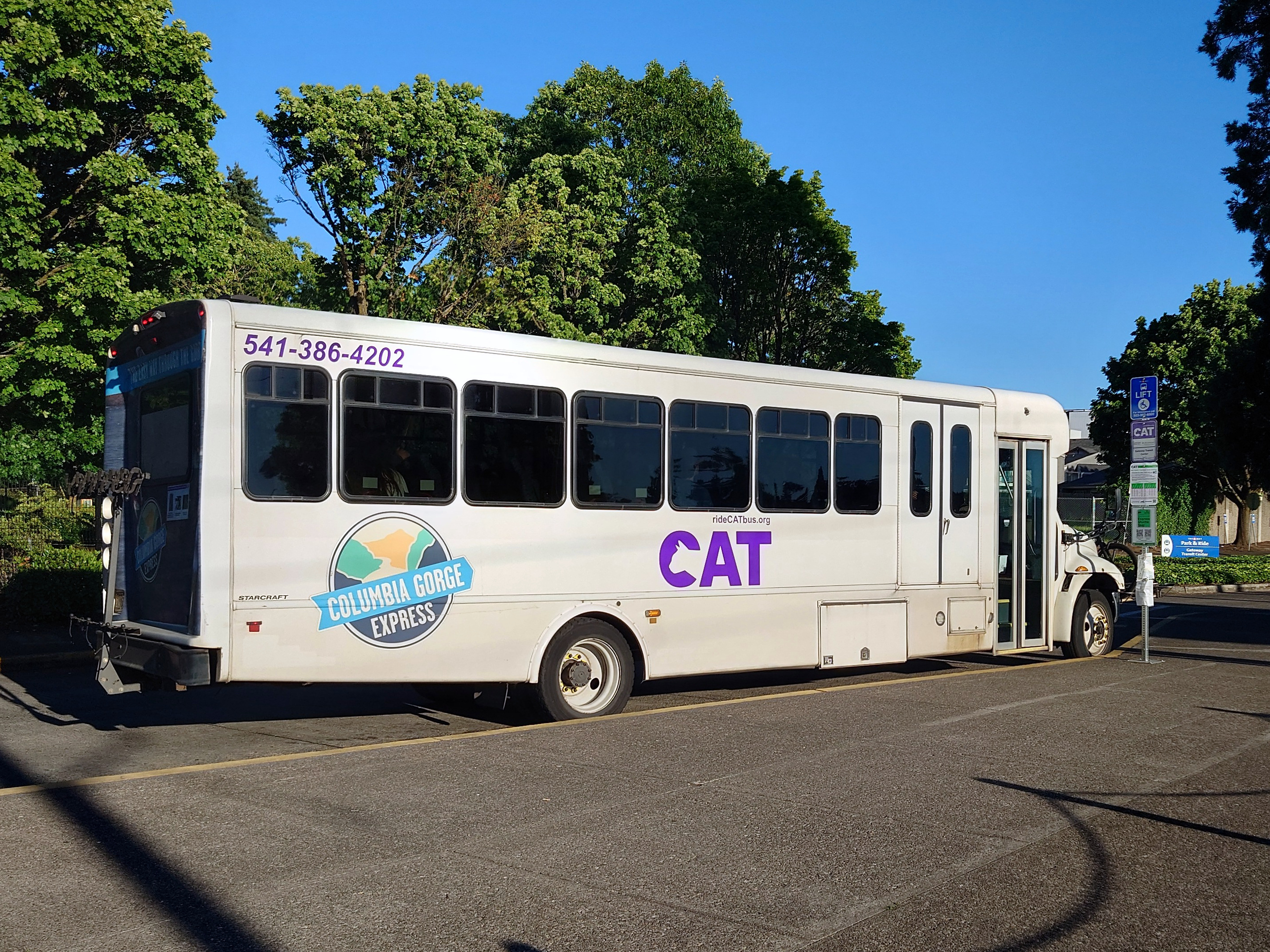
- Founded: 1993
- Headquarters: Hood River, OR
- Locale: Hood River County, Oregon, U.S.
- Service area: Hood River County
- Service type: Fixed Route, Paratransit, Deviated Fixed Route
- Routes: 7
- Destinations: Hood River County
- Hubs: Hood River, Portland, The Dalles
- Stations: CAT Offices
- Fleet: 15
- Annual ridership: 50,953 (in 2020)
- Fuel type: Electric, gasoline, diesel
- Chief executive: Patty Fink - Executive Director
- Website: ridecatbus.org

Columbia Area Transit (CAT), officially the Hood River County Transportation District, is a public transit agency serving Hood River County, Oregon, United States. It operates local bus routes in Hood River, as well as commuter bus routes to Portland, The Dalles, and other nearby communities. The "major" sources of funding include grants from the Federal Transit Administration, several different sources from the State of Oregon, local property tax, and user fees. The District was formed by a vote of Hood River County residents in 1992 and took effect July 1, 1993.

== Columbia Gorge Express ==
The Columbia Gorge Express is an intercity bus route that Columbia Area Transit operates between Portland, Oregon, and Hood River, Oregon. The route originates at the Gateway/Northeast 99th Avenue Transit Center on the eastern edge of Portland and follows I-84 to Hood River. Intermediate stops are at Troutdale, Oregon, Multnomah Falls, and Cascade Locks, Oregon.
