= Parkrose/Sumner Transit Center =

Light rail station in Portland, Oregon, U.S.

Parkrose/Sumner TC
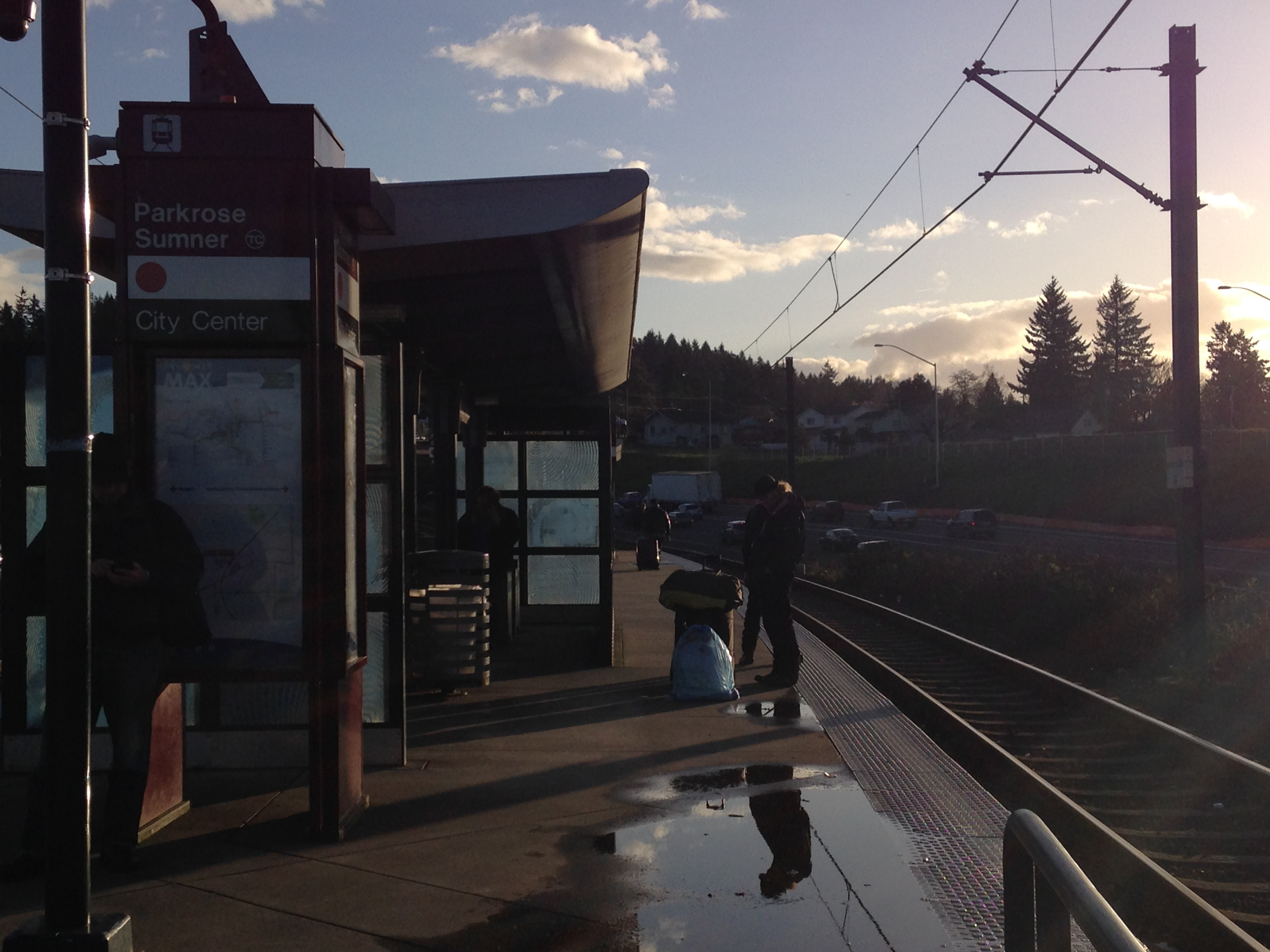

General information
- Location: 9481 NE Sandy Blvd; Portland, Oregon; USA
- Coordinates: 45°33′33″N 122°33′56″W
- Owner: TriMet
- Platforms: 1 island platform
- Tracks: 2
- Bus routes: TriMet: 12, 21, 71, 73, 87; C-Tran: 65
- Bus stands: 12
- Bus operators: TriMet and C-Tran

Construction
- Parking: 193 spaces
- Cycle facilities: bike lockers and racks
- Accessible: yes

History
- Opened: September 10, 2001

Services
Preceding station	TriMet	Following station
Gateway North toward Hillsboro Airport/Fairgrounds	Red Line	Cascades toward Portland Airport
Gateway/Northeast 99th Avenue Transit Center One-way operation	Red Line	Cascades toward Portland Airport
Location

Parkrose/Sumner Transit Center is a TriMet transit center and light rail station on the MAX Red Line in Portland, Oregon. It is the fourth stop north on the Airport MAX branch, and consists of an island platform in the median of Interstate 205. The entrance and exit to the transit center are on Sandy Blvd. near 95th Avenue, in the Parkrose neighborhood and east of the Sumner neighborhood.

It is a hub for bus service to Gresham, Tigard, Lents, Fairview, Vancouver, Wood Village and Clackamas. A bridge across the northbound lanes of I-205 connects the MAX platform to a park-and-ride lot and bus stops.

== Park and ride ==
For almost 20 years before it became a transit center and MAX station, the site was already in use as a TriMet park-and-ride lot. TriMet's proposal to build the facility, with 288 spaces on a 3.6-acre (1.5 ha) lot, was approved by the Multnomah County Planning Commission in September 1983, and the lot opened for use in summer 1984. It was not designated as a transit center, because it was served by only a single bus route (14-Sandy, renumbered 12 in 1986), and was referred to by TriMet as the Parkrose Park & Ride. A second bus route, 201-Airport Way, began serving the Parkrose Park and Ride later. In 2000–2001, a MAX light rail station was constructed adjacent to the park-and-ride lot. Additional bus routes began serving the site when the MAX station opened in September 2001, at which time it was newly designated as a transit center and was renamed Parkrose/Sumner Transit Center.

As a result of 2001 expansion of the bus roadway and stops, and the addition of a building for use by drivers on layover, the size of the park-and-ride lot was reduced and the lot currently has 193 spaces.

== Bus service ==
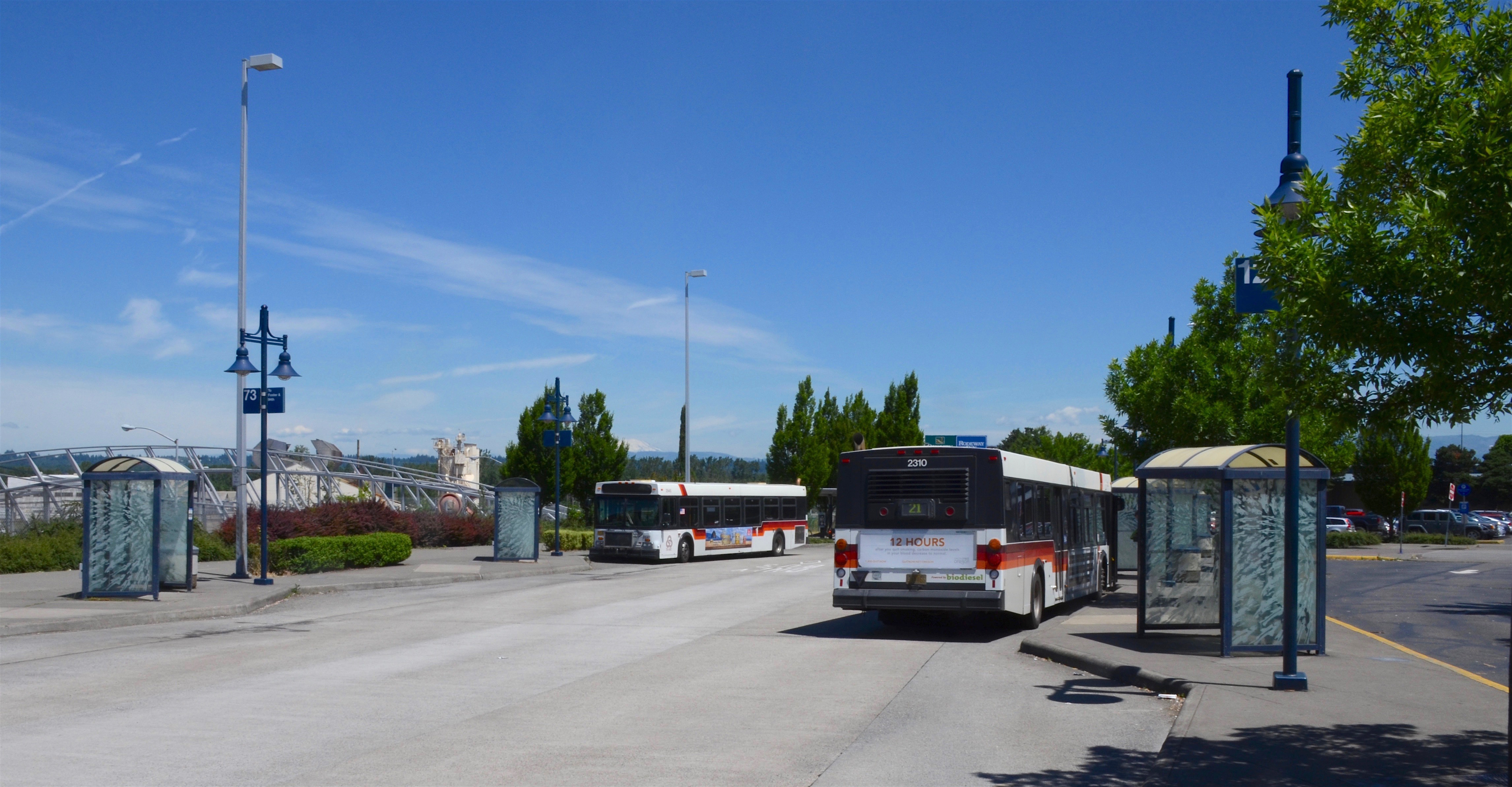
The transit center's bus stops

This transit center is served by the following bus lines:

- 12 – Barbur/Sandy Blvd
- 21 – Sandy Blvd/223rd
- 71 – 60th Ave
- 73 – 122nd Ave
- 87 – Airport Way/181st
- C-Tran 65 – Parkrose Regional

== Unique station features ==
- Flashbird Bridge: Designed by Ed Carpenter and KPFF Engineering, the bridge was meant to be inspired by its location near the Columbia River and the Portland International Airport. The form is meant to suggest a creature that might swim or fly.
- Furniture: Designed by Peter Reiquam, two pieces symbolizing home and office for the direction one is going, adorn the platform.
- Windscreen: Christine Bourdette and Vicki Scuri worked with the project architects to design the windscreen in ceramic frit.
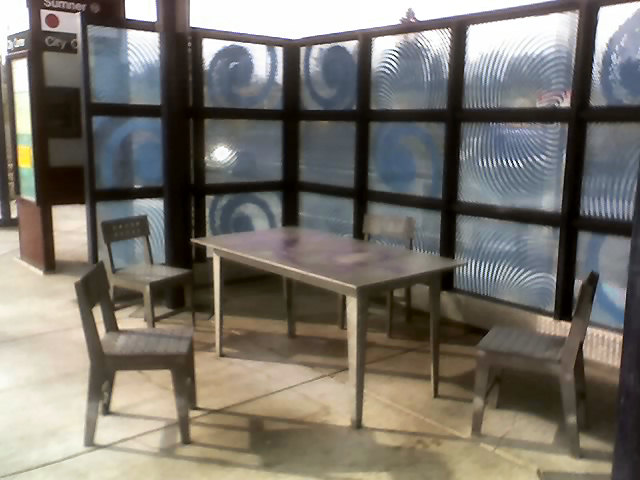
Dining table and chairs

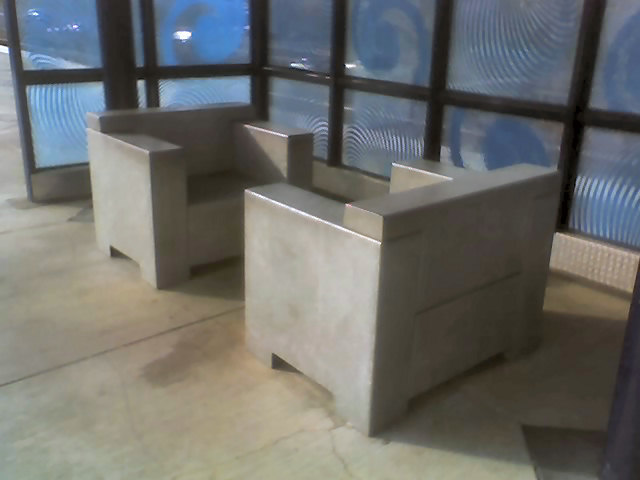
Office seating

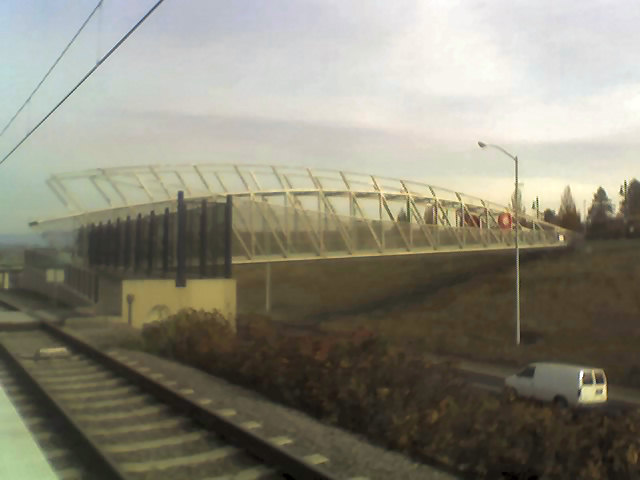
Flashbird bridge viewed from station platform

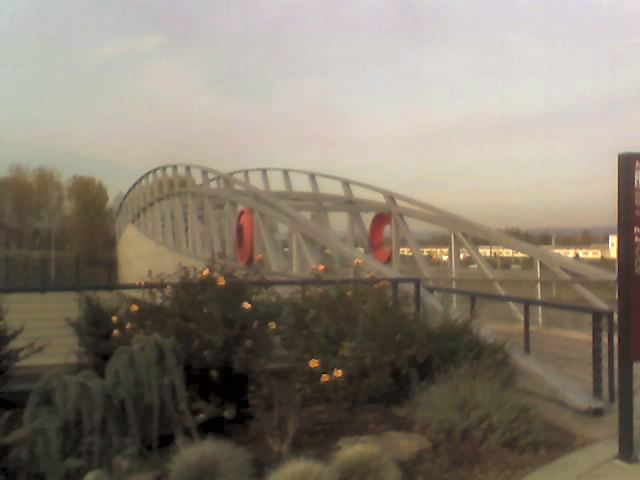
Flashbird bridge viewed from Transit Center

== See also ==
- List of TriMet transit centers
