= Rose City Park, Portland, Oregon =

Rose City Park
- Neighborhood
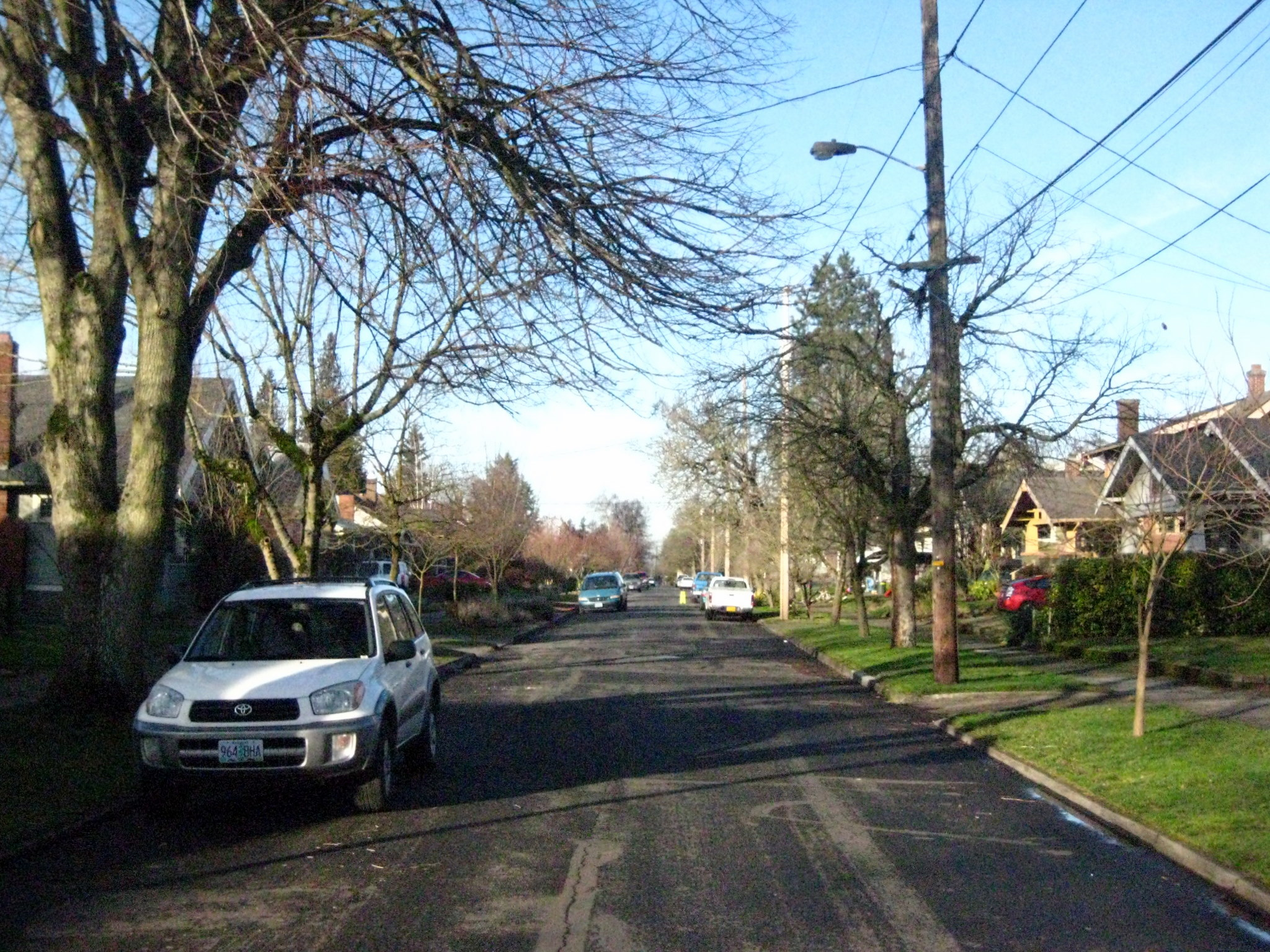
- Location in Portland
- Coordinates: 45°32′16″N 122°36′21″W
- Country: United States
- State: Oregon
- City: Portland

Government
  - Association: Rose City Park Neighborhood Association
  - Coalition: Northeast Coalition of Neighborhoods

Area
  - Total: 1.17 sq mi (3.04 km^{2})

Population (2000)
  - Total: 8,903
  - Density: 7,590/sq mi (2,930/km^{2})

Housing
  - No. of households: 3859
  - Occupancy rate: 97% occupied
  - Owner-occupied: 2857 households (74%)
  - Renting: 1002 households (26%)
  - Avg. household size: 2.31 persons

Rose City Park is a neighborhood (and a park of the same name) in Northeast Portland, Oregon. It borders Beaumont-Wilshire, Grant Park, and the Hollywood District on the west (at NE 47th Avenue), Cully on the north (at NE Fremont Street), Roseway and Madison South on the east (at NE 65th Avenue), and Center on the south (at the Banfield Expressway and MAX transit line).

The neighborhood was platted in 1907, the year of the first Portland Rose Festival. Trolley service from Downtown Portland was inaugurated that year by the Portland Railway, Light & Power Co., and discontinued November 30, 1936.

In addition to its eponymous park (acquired 1920), other parks in the neighborhood include Normandale Park (1940), Frazer Park (1950, on the site of a former juvenile detention center), and the western part of Rose City Golf Course (1920), whose clubhouse was listed on the National Register of Historic Places in 2012. A statue of George Washington was commissioned by Henry Waldo Coe and sculpted by Pompeo Coppini, and dedicated on July 4, 1927. It stood at 57th Avenue and Sandy Boulevard, in the center of the neighborhood, until it was toppled and burned by rioters on June 18, 2020, in the aftermath of the murder of George Floyd at the hands of police in Minneapolis, Minnesota. Beginning in March 1946, NABISCO proposed building a large factory on 24 acres (97,000 m^{2}) in the Rose City Park neighborhood, choosing the location for proximity of workers and access to the rail line. The city council approved the zoning change on June 5, 1947, but by June 26, 1947, NABISCO abandoned the project, building a plant at the northern edge of the Piedmont neighborhood on Columbia Boulevard. The plant was completed in August 1950.

The NE 60th Ave station on the Blue Line and Red Line of the MAX light rail system is on the boundary (Interstate 84) with the Center neighborhood.

In July 2008, Forbes magazine named Rose City Park the ninth most overpriced neighborhood in the country. This was based on a price-to-earnings spread comparing rental costs with buying costs for similar properties, based on number of bedrooms, location and price per square foot. A neighborhood with a high price-to-earnings spread is considered overvalued because a buyer is getting a low return based on costs and paying a huge premium to live in area relative to how much it would cost to rent a similar property there.

== See also ==
- Alameda Ridge
- Der Rheinlander
- Rose City Food Park
