= Gateway Transit Center (TriMet) =

Public transportation hub in Portland, Oregon

Gateway/NE 99th Ave TC Gateway North
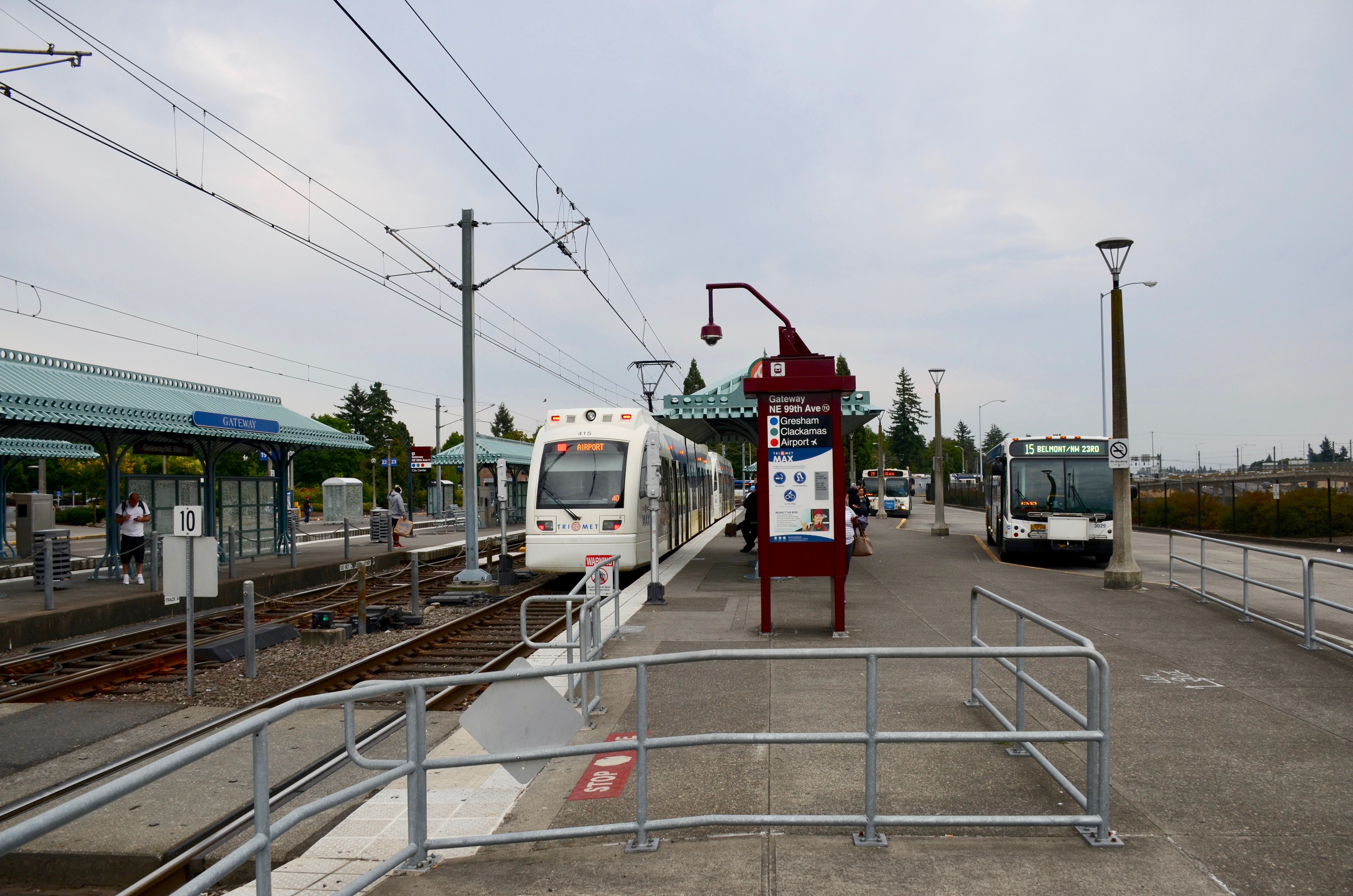
- The transit center's west side. The center has bus stops on both the east and west sides of the MAX station.

General information
- Location: 9900 NE Multnomah St; Portland, Oregon, United States
- Coordinates: 45°31′50″N 122°33′49″W
- Owner: TriMet
- Platforms: Gateway/NE 99th Ave TC: 1 island & 2 side platforms Gateway North: 1 side platform
- Tracks: 3
- Bus routes: TriMet: 15, 19, 22, 23, 24, 25, 87; Columbia Gorge Express
- Bus stands: 13

Construction
- Parking: 690 spaces
- Cycle facilities: Bike lockers and banks
- Accessible: yes

History
- Opened: September 5, 1986

Passengers
Gateway/NE 99th Avenue Transit Center
- Fall 2025: 6,663 (average weekday)
- Rank: 1 of 94
Gateway North
- Fall 2025: 632 (average weekday)
- Rank: 78 of 94

Services
Preceding station	TriMet	Following station
Gateway/NE 99th Avenue Transit Center
NE 82nd Ave toward Hatfield Government Center	Blue Line	E 102nd Ave toward Cleveland Ave
Terminus	Green Line	SE Main St toward Clackamas Town Center Transit Center
NE 82nd Ave One-way operation	Red Line	Parkrose/Sumner Transit Center toward Portland Airport
Gateway North
NE 82nd Ave toward Hillsboro Airport/Fairgrounds	Red Line	Parkrose/Sumner Transit Center One-way operation
Former services
Preceding station	TriMet	Following station
Gateway/NE 99th Avenue Transit Center
NE 82nd Ave toward Beaverton Transit Center	Red Line 2001–2024	Parkrose/Sumner Transit Center toward Portland Airport
Location

Gateway Transit Center is a multimodal transport hub in Portland, Oregon, United States. Owned and operated by TriMet, it comprises Gateway/Northeast 99th Avenue Transit Center, a bus transit center and light rail station serving the MAX Green and Blue Lines and eastbound Red Line trains, and Gateway North station, a separate station served by westbound Red Line trains. The complex is where the three lines split, with the Blue Line proceeding east to Gresham, the Green Line proceeding south to Clackamas, and the Red Line proceeding north to Portland International Airport. It is TriMet's second-busiest transit center after Rose Quarter Transit Center, with 8,928 average weekday boardings and alightings for all modes in fall 2025.

When opened in 1986, it was the busiest station on the Portland–Gresham MAX line, the only line in the system at that time, and was the terminus of 11 bus lines. Currently seven bus lines serve the Gateway Transit Center.

The transit center is next to the interchange of Interstate 84 and Interstate 205, and behind the Gateway Shopping Center, which until 2025 was anchored by a Fred Meyer store. Neighborhoods served by this station include Hazelwood, Woodland Park, Parkrose Heights, Madison South and Montavilla.

== Platform layout ==
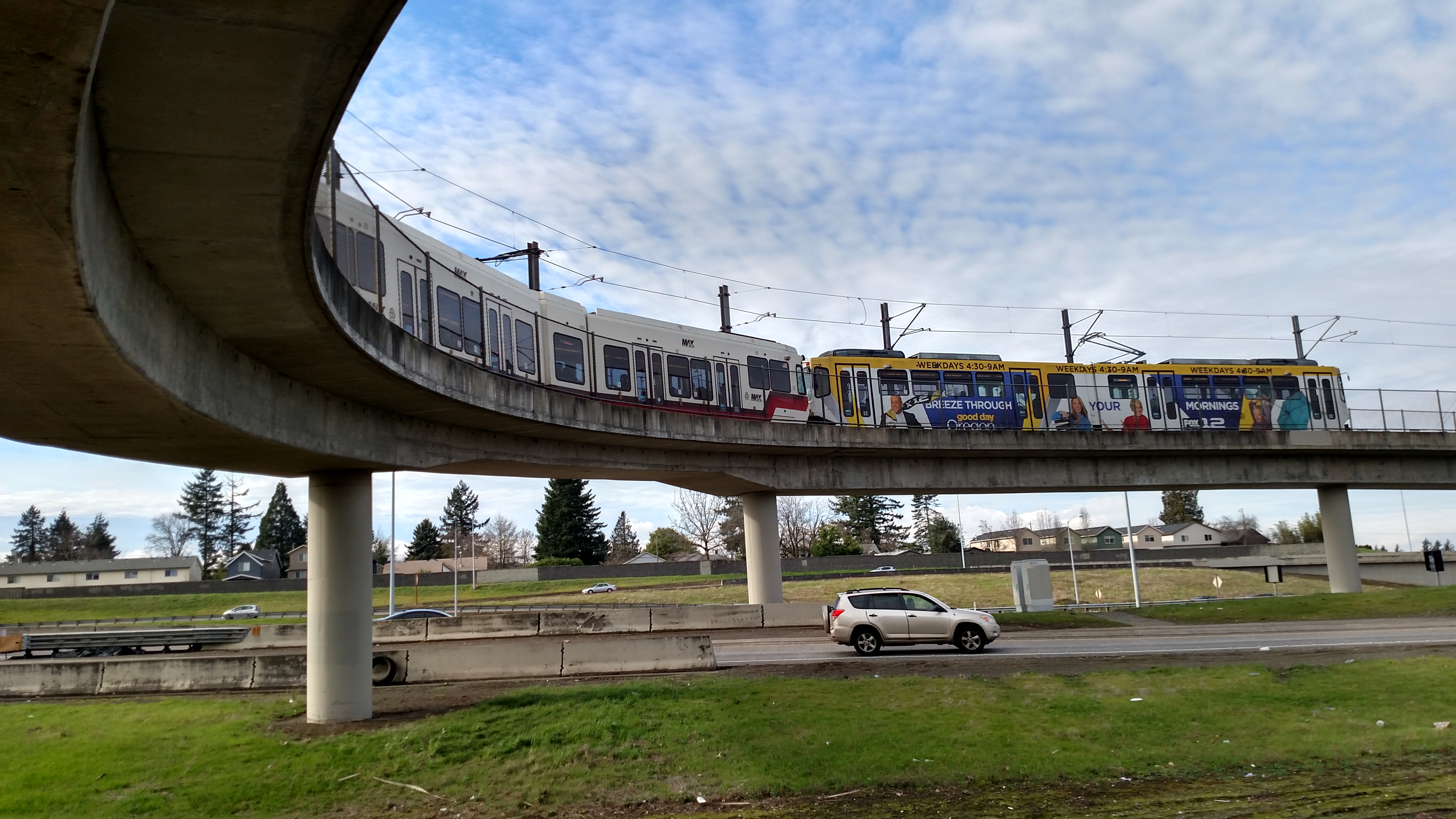
A Red Line train on the curved bridge south of the station. Until 2024, this single-track bridge built in 2001 was used by trains operating in both directions.

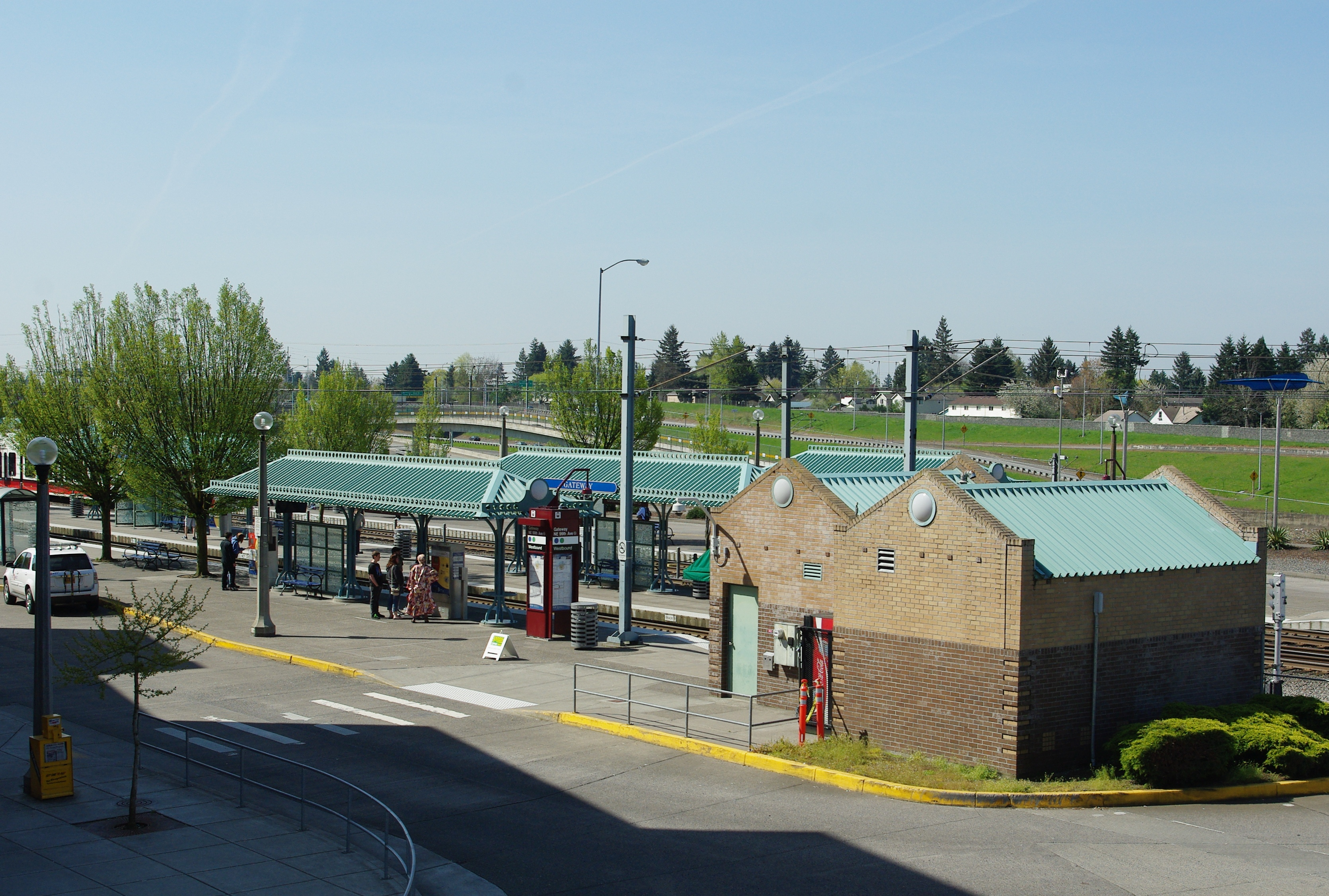
View of the transit center from its parking garage. The brick buildings in the foreground house a MAX traction substation and a break room for TriMet bus drivers.

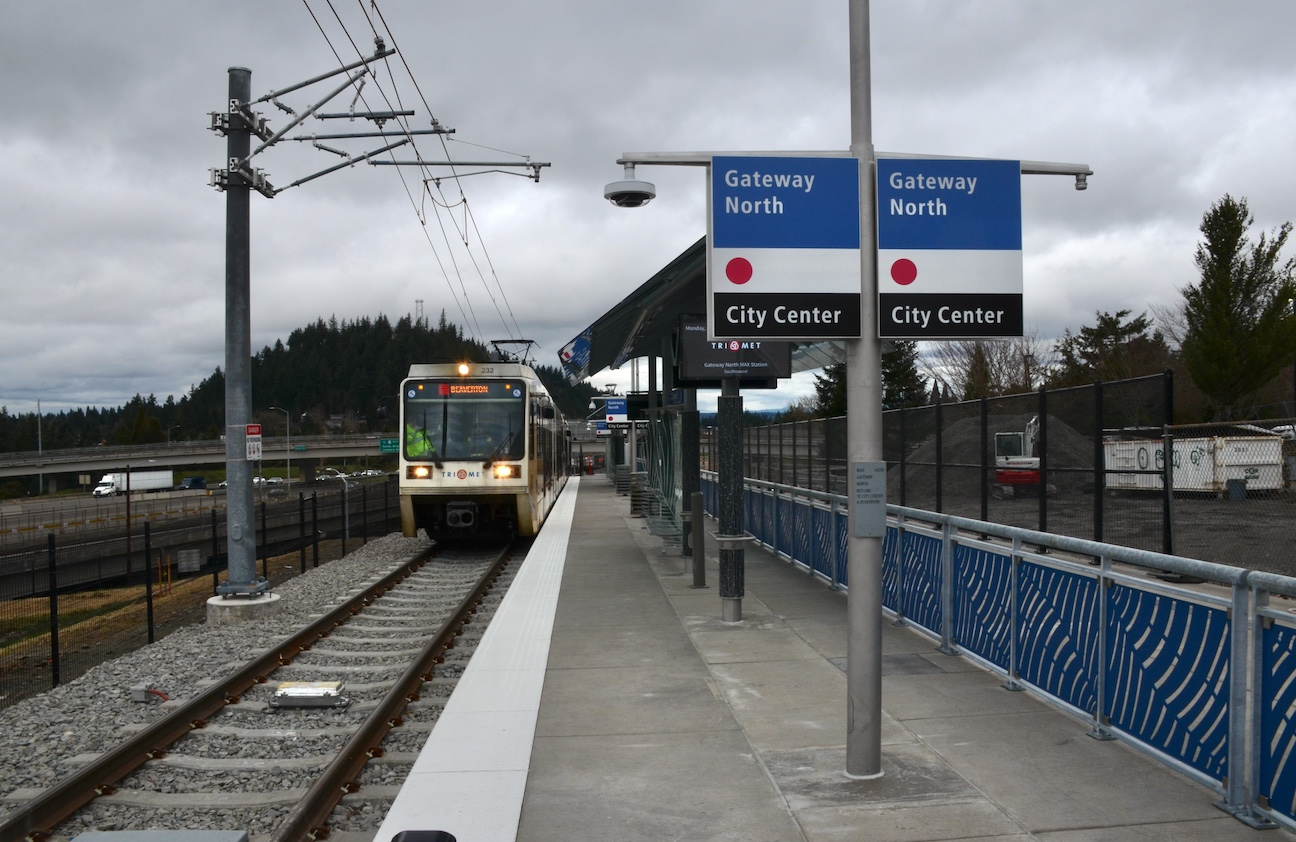
The Gateway North station on the day of opening, in 2024

The original Gateway station includes three light rail tracks and platforms, with bus stops located on the east side of the station. The easternmost track is used by inbound (westbound) Blue Line trains. Trains on this track open up doors to both the side and center platforms. The middle track is to the west of the center platform and is used by Green Line trains; it was used by inbound Red Line trains prior to March 4, 2024. The westernmost track has a side platform and is used by outbound (eastbound) Blue and Red Line trains.

Prior to March 2024, inbound Red Line trains stopped at the center track because of the way the Red Line junction was configured. Because the tracks going into Gateway eastbound approach from the north, running the Red Line north to the airport from Gateway would have required the operator to change cabs. To rectify the problem, TriMet created a special configuration to the Red Line junction. Inbound, the double track line narrowed to single track about 0.5 miles (0.80 km) north of Gateway. The track runs adjacent to I-205, crosses under the main line, then swings around north on a sharp horseshoe turn, and merges with the outbound track just south of Gateway. Inbound trains then used the center track switches to cross over to the inbound track. From 2022 to 2024, as part of the Better Red project to eliminate both sections of single track on the Red Line, TriMet reconfigured the junction by adding a new section of southbound-only track about 3,400 ft (1,000 m) long that included a new station used only by southbound/inbound Red Line trains, which opened on March 4, 2024. Under the new configuration, inbound Red Line trains approaching Gateway ascend onto a flyover bridge that crosses over the now outbound-only track. After crossing I-84, trains stop at a platform 500 feet (152 m) north of the original station. After making their stop, trains make a right curve, cross the inbound Blue Line track, and merge with the center track before merging with the inbound track. The original loop remains in use by outbound Red Line trains.

In comparison, the Green Line's junction with the Blue Line, 0.5 miles (0.80 km) south of Gateway, is configured as a standard diverging junction.

Parking at this station and transit center was originally entirely in the form of surface lots, but in June 2006 TriMet opened a new 690-space parking garage. This compensated for the closure of the surface lot closest to the station, which was replaced by a medical building. A surface lot to the south of the station, in place since the station's opening in 1986, was not affected.

== Bus service ==
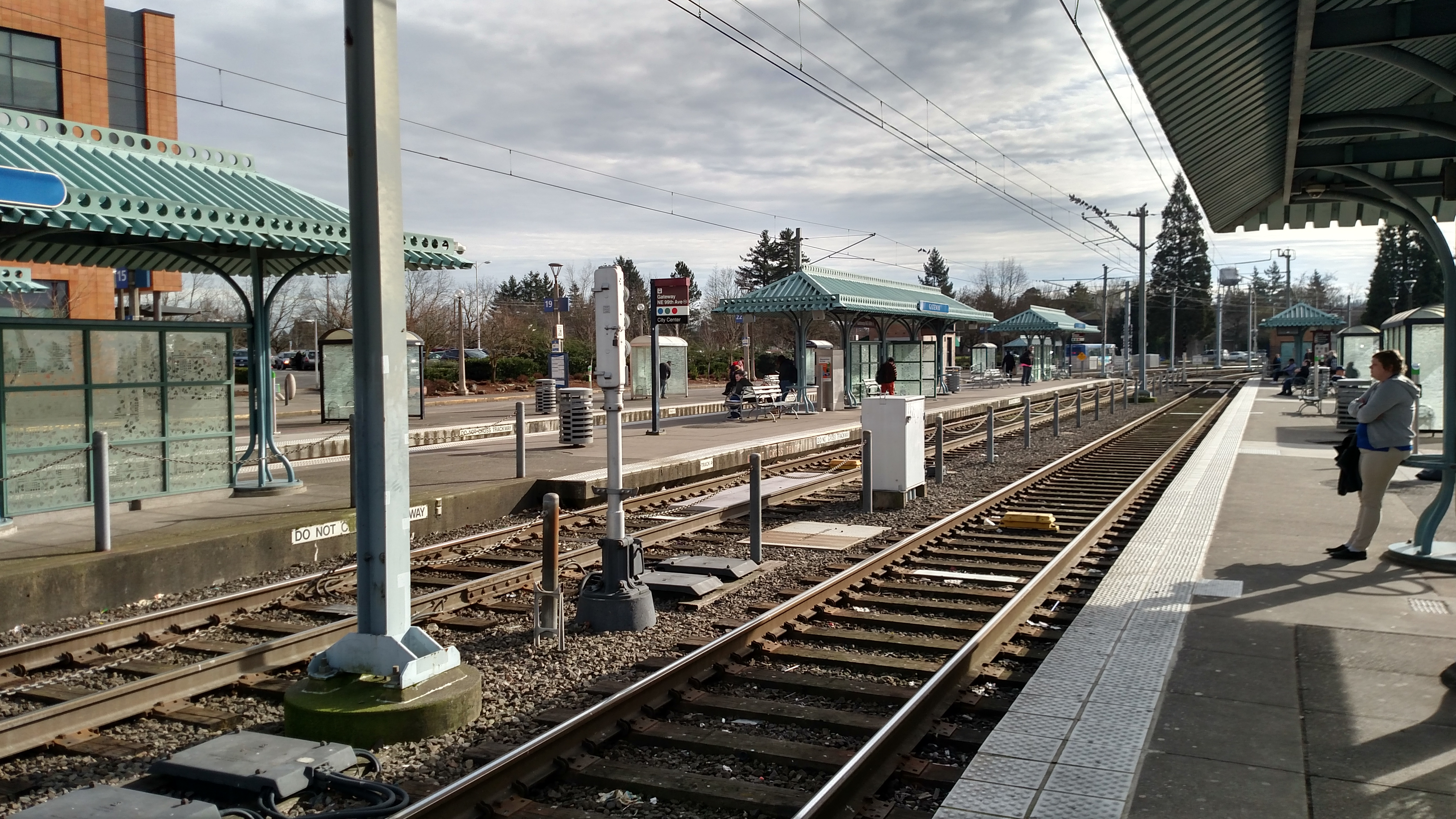
Looking southeast from the outbound MAX platform in 2018, showing all three tracks

This station in the Gateway District is served by the following bus lines:

- 15 – Belmont/NW 23rd
- 19 – Glisan/Canyon Rd
- 22 – Parkrose
- 23 – San Rafael
- 24 – Fremont/NW 18th
- 25 – Glisan/Troutdale Rd
- 87 – Airport Way/181st
- Columbia Gorge Express (intercity service to Multnomah Falls, Cascade Locks, and Hood River)

== Unique station features ==
The station has the following features:

- Feathers: Designed by Frank Boyden, they consist of three 14–18 feet long painted aluminum feathers that work as windvanes on 20 feet poles.
- Blackberry frosted glass: The windscreens at this station (and many others) have a frosted/etched pattern of the pervasive blackberry in Oregon.

== See also ==
- List of TriMet transit centers
