= Roseway, Portland, Oregon =

Roseway
- Neighborhood
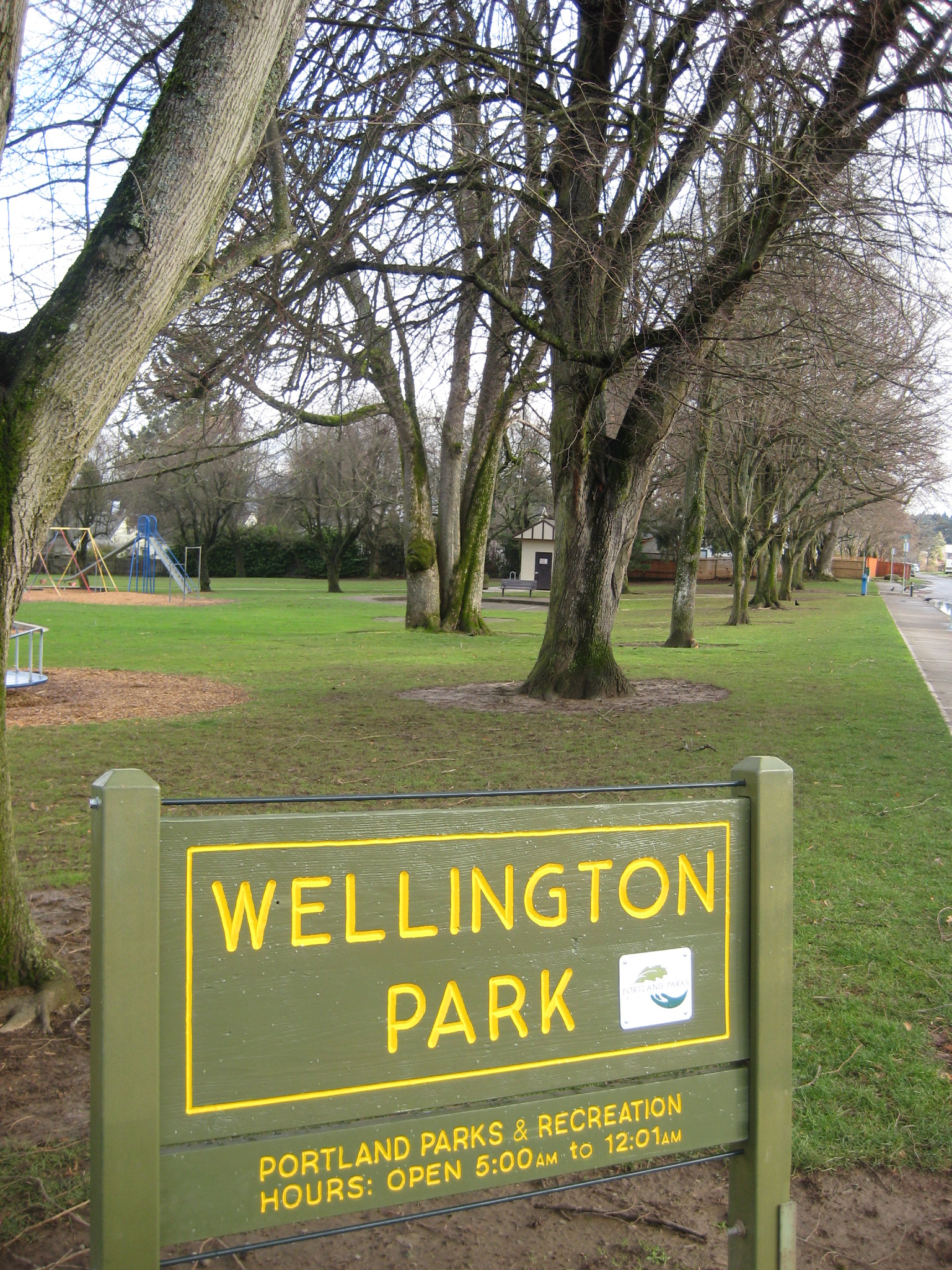
- Wellington Park, Roseway.
- Location in Portland
- Coordinates: 45°32′54″N 122°35′20″W
- Country: United States
- State: Oregon
- City: Portland

Government
  - Association: Roseway Neighborhood Association
  - Coalition: Central Northeast Neighbors, Inc.

Area
  - Total: 0.81 sq mi (2.09 km^{2})

Population (2000)
  - Total: 6,185
  - Density: 7,660/sq mi (2,960/km^{2})

Housing
  - No. of households: 2647
  - Occupancy rate: 97% occupied
  - Owner-occupied: 2023 households (76%)
  - Renting: 624 households (24%)
  - Avg. household size: 2.34 persons

Roseway is a neighborhood in the Northeast section of Portland, Oregon. It is bordered by the neighborhoods Cully to the north (at NE Prescott St.) and west (at NE 62nd Ave.), Sumner to the northeast, Madison South to the east (at NE 82nd Ave.) and south (at NE Sacramento St.), and Rose City Park to the west (at NE 65th Ave.)

Roseway includes two parks: Wellington Park, acquired in 1941, and Glenhaven Park, acquired in 1948. Glenhaven is the larger of the two, and includes a skatepark, playground, fields for soccer, baseball and softball, tennis courts, disabled-access play area, restrooms, picnic tables, and a wading pool.

There are three public schools located within or adjacent to the Roseway neighborhood. These schools are Scott (K-5), Roseway Heights (6-8), and McDaniel High (9-12). The Gregory Heights branch of the Multnomah County Library is at NE 79th and Sandy.

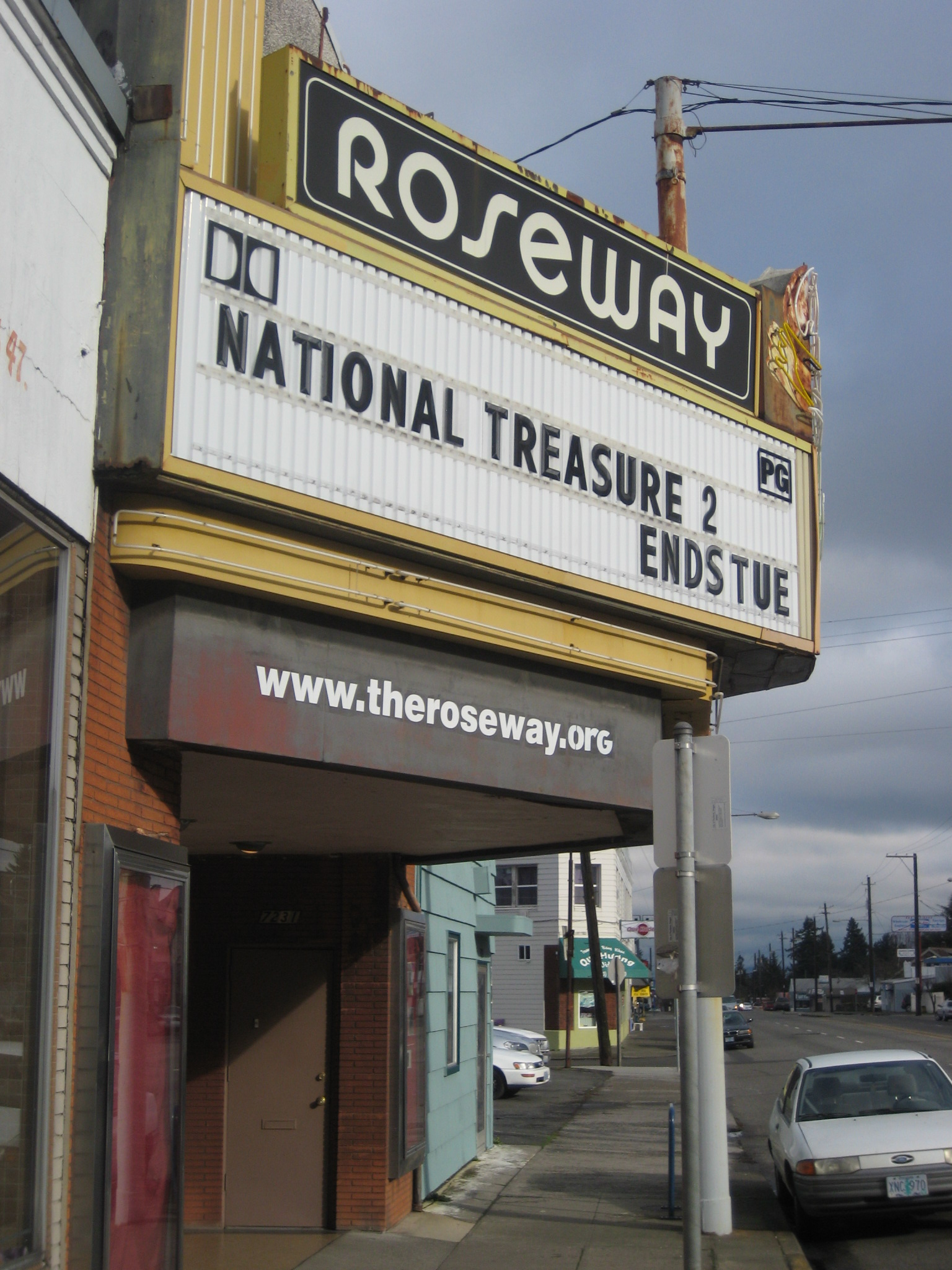
Historic Roseway Theater

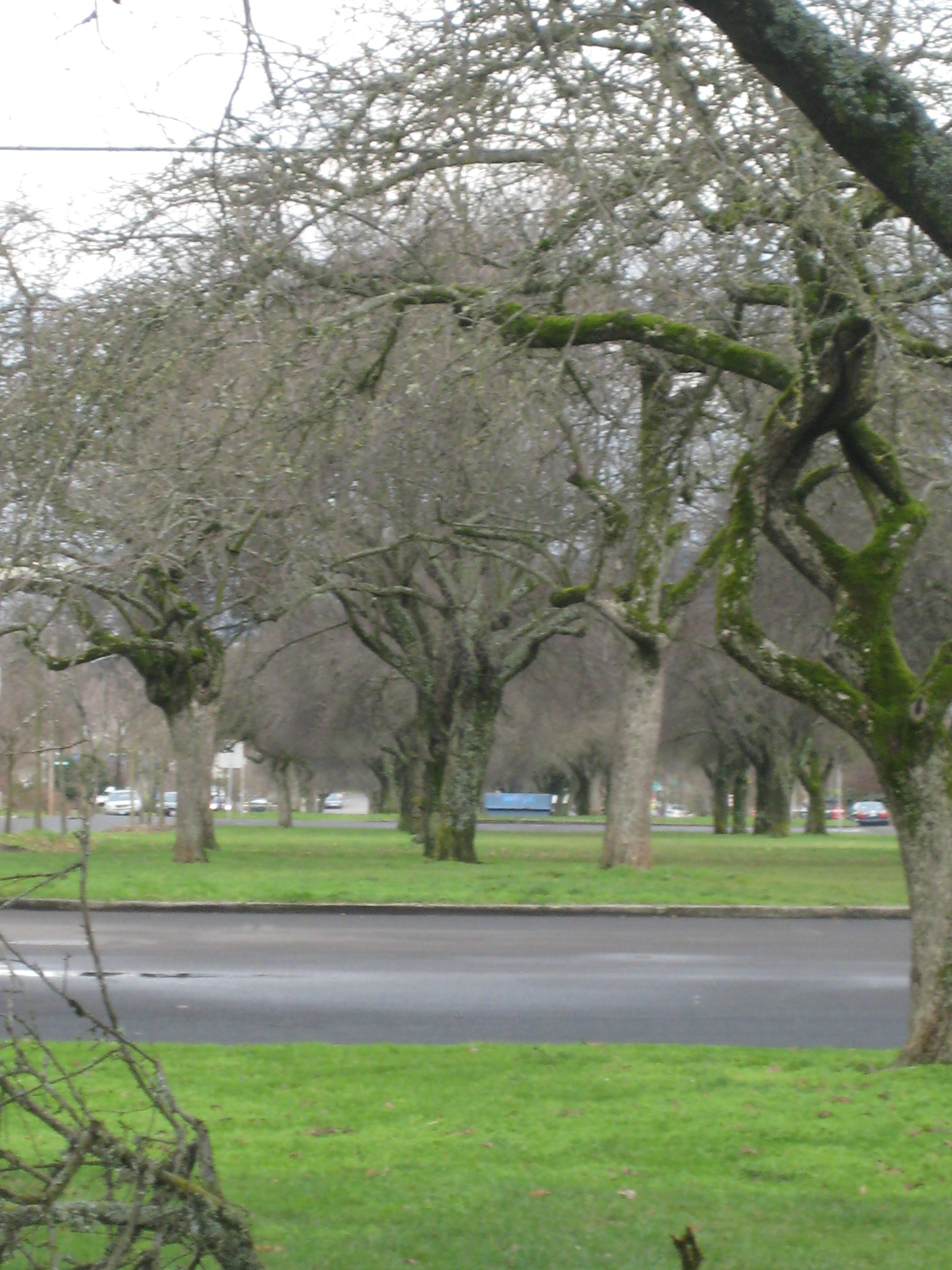
North on 72nd Ave
