= MAX Red Line =

Light rail line in Portland, Oregon

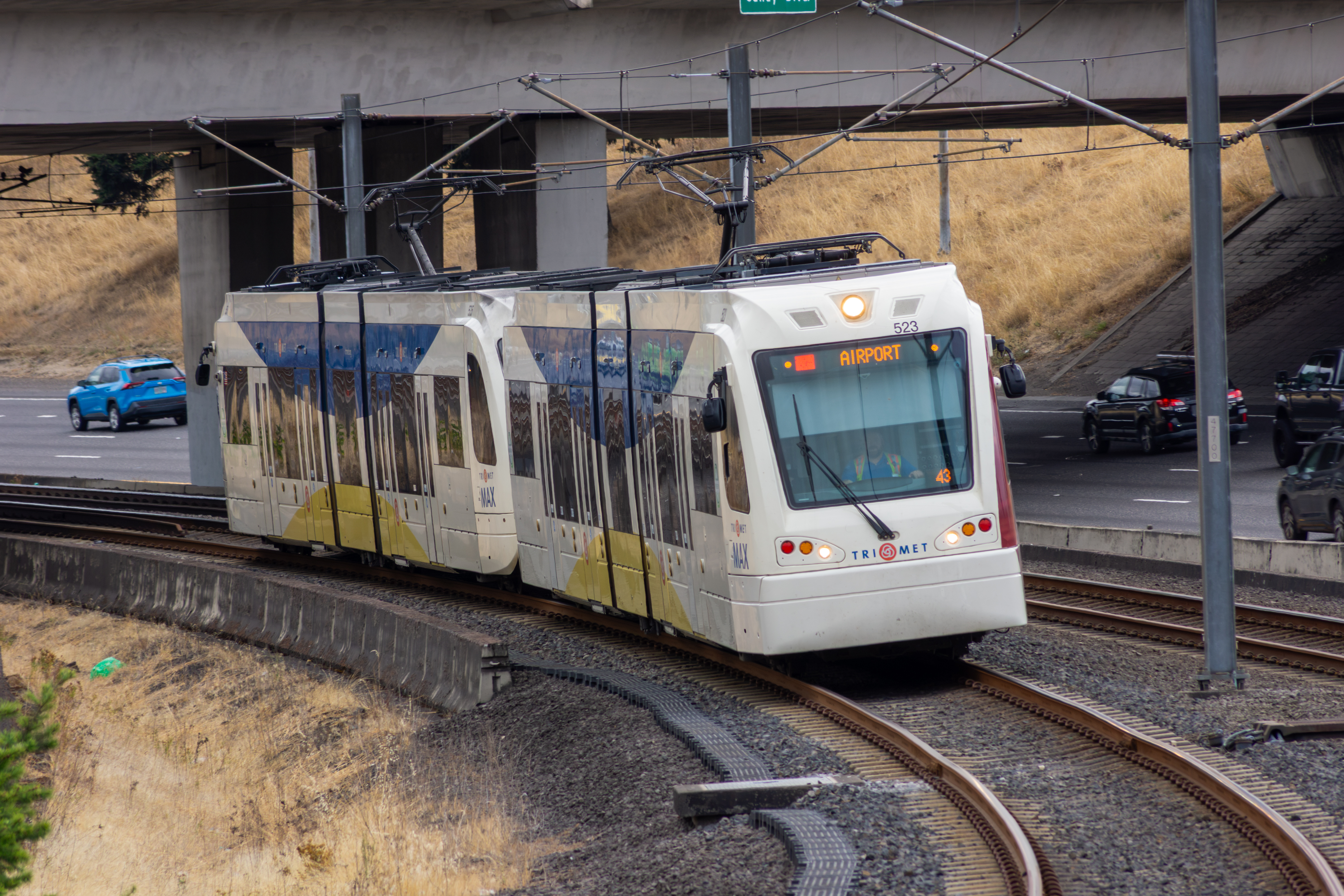
- A Red Line train approaching Parkrose/Sumner Transit Center

Overview
- Other name: Airport MAX
- Owner: TriMet
- Locale: Portland, Oregon, U.S.
- Termini: Hillsboro Airport/Fairgrounds (west); Portland Airport (east)
- Stations: 36
- Website: MAX Red Line

Service
- Type: Light rail
- System: MAX Light Rail
- Operator: TriMet
- Daily ridership: 15,574 (2025, weekdays)

History
- Opened: September 10, 2001; 25 years ago

Technical
- Line length: 5.5 mi (8.9 km) (Note: TriMet publications only provide the total length of the Airport MAX extension, i.e., the 5.5-mile (8.9 km) section that was newly built. The total length of Red Line service, which includes segments of the Eastside MAX and the Westside MAX, has not been published.)
- Num of tracks: 2
- Character: At-grade, elevated, and underground
- Track gauge: 4 ft 8 1/2 in (1,435 mm) standard gauge
- Electrification: Overhead line, 750 V DC

The MAX Red Line is a light rail line serving the Portland metropolitan area in the U.S. state of Oregon. Operated by TriMet as part of MAX Light Rail, it is an airport rail link connecting Hillsboro, Beaverton, Portland City Center, Northeast Portland, and Portland International Airport. The line serves 36 stations; it shares its route with the Blue Line from Hillsboro Airport/Fairgrounds station to Gateway Transit Center and then branches off to Portland Airport station. Trains run at frequencies of 15 to 30 minutes. The Red Line carried an average 17,390 passengers per weekday in September 2024.

Plans for light rail service to Portland International Airport surfaced in the 1980s, and efforts were accelerated during the airport's expansion in the 1990s. The Airport MAX project was conceived from an unsolicited proposal by Bechtel in 1997, and it was designed and built under a public–private partnership between a consortium of Bechtel and Trammell Crow, the Port of Portland, and local governments. Construction of the four-station, 5.5-mile (8.9 km) branch line began in 1999 and was completed in under two years due to the use of local and private financing and existing public right-of-way.

The Red Line began operating between the airport and downtown Portland on September 10, 2001. It was extended west along existing MAX tracks to Beaverton Transit Center in 2003. In 2024, the A Better Red project eliminated two single-track segments along the Airport MAX and extended Red Line service farther west to Hillsboro Airport and Westside Commons, formerly Washington County Fairgrounds, in Hillsboro.

== History ==
=== Background ===
In 1975, Multnomah County leaders negotiated reducing the number of car lanes along a future nine-mile (14 km) section of the controversial Interstate 205 (I-205) freeway and proposed a separated transit bus right-of-way instead. This segment was realized as the I-205 busway, but it was never utilized by buses. In 1985, the Portland metropolitan area's regional government, Metro, began a study at the request of the Port of Portland and Clackamas County for a light rail line using the I-205 busway. They envisioned the line running from Portland International Airport to Clackamas Town Center, connecting with the then-nearly completed Metropolitan Area Express (MAX) line, which traveled perpendicularly between Portland and Gresham. Metro had recommended construction by 1995, but in 1987, the Joint Policy Advisory Committee on Transportation (JPACT) separately identified the Westside Corridor from downtown Portland to Washington County as the "next priority corridor for major investment".

Metro and the regional transit agency, TriMet, subsequently called on local governments and businesses in Clackamas County to pursue alternative funding sources for the I-205 line, which Clackamas County officials disputed. As a compromise, Metro published a transit plan in 1989 that reasserted the Westside Corridor's priority and commissioned preliminary work for the I-205 proposal. Ensuing alternatives analyses eventually caused Metro planners to shift light rail plans away from the I-205 corridor in favor of another north–south route farther west closer to downtown Portland; this route, between Hazel Dell, Washington and Clackamas Town Center, became known as the "South/North Corridor". Voters rejected local funding proposals for the South/North project in 1995 and 1996. In December 1996, Metro proposed combining the South/North project with a locally and privately funded airport light rail extension, as doing so would allow Metro to ask for more federal matching funds. TriMet, however, opted to ask Portland-area voters for funding instead, who declined in a 1998 ballot measure.

=== Airport expansion and partnership agreement ===
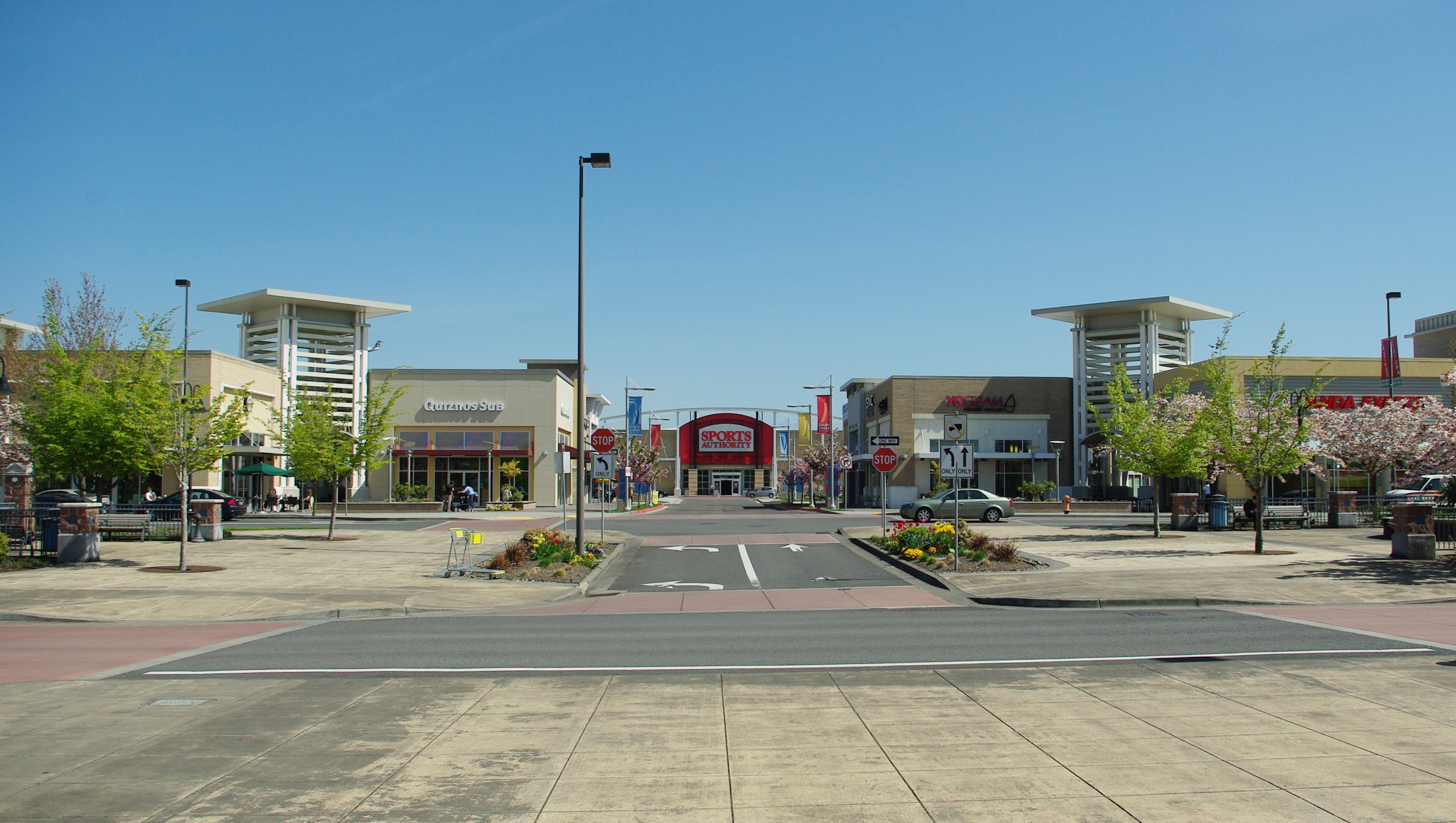
Cascade Station shopping center, which Bechtel developed in exchange for building the Airport MAX

In 1991, the Port approved a master plan for Portland International Airport—a 20-year, $300 million phased expansion of the passenger terminal—to serve predicted passenger traffic growth through 2010. The plan included a long-term goal for an extension of light rail to the airport. Improvements to the southern portion of the terminal were announced in 1995 in response to unanticipated growth. Designed by Zimmer Gunsul Frasca (ZGF), Terminal Expansion South included a light rail station between the airport access road and the south concourse, 150 feet (46 m) from the baggage claim area.

In 1997, engineering firm Bechtel, wanting to acquire property near the airport, submitted an unsolicited proposal to develop the airport light rail line. The Port expressed its support of the proposal, and a preliminary engineering study commenced in December. After long deliberations, agreements were made between Bechtel, the Port, TriMet, and local governments and agencies in October 1998. A part of the agreements authorized Bechtel to design and build a 5.5-mile-long (8.9 km) light rail extension to the airport in exchange for development rights to the 120-acre (48.6 ha), commercially zoned Portland International Center situated east of the airport. Bechtel later developed this property and renamed it Cascade Station. The following month, the Associated Builders and Contractors filed a petition in Multnomah County Circuit Court claiming that the contract awarded to Bechtel may have violated Oregon procurement laws. The court ruled in favor of TriMet with the judge declaring that the contract was awarded fairly.

=== Funding and construction ===
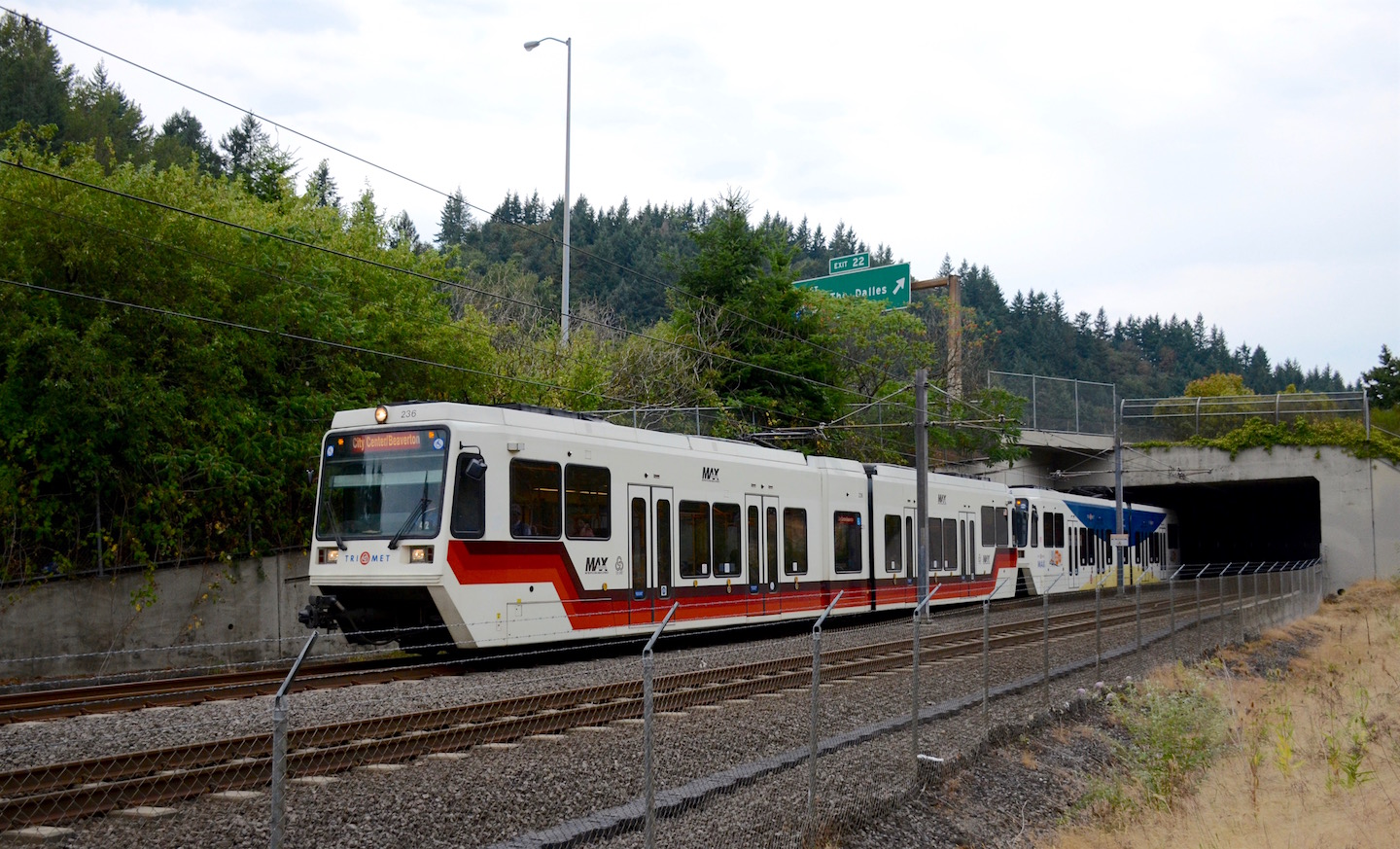
The south portal of the tunnel that was built in the late 1970s as part of the I-205 busway and was first brought into use by the Red Line

The Airport MAX project's timeline was accelerated with the formation of a public–private partnership, which excluded Federal Transit Administration (FTA) funding and thus eliminated a requirement for FTA approval. TriMet had estimated the extension would cost $125 million, but additional costs to purchase train sets and build related infrastructure raised the total to $182.7 million. U.S. federal regulations and an authorization from the Federal Aviation Administration (FAA) limited the Port to funding only a 1.2-mile (1.9 km) stretch within airport property. To ensure funding for the entire project, the Port divided financing into three parts and assumed responsibility for that segment. The next 1.4 miles (2.3 km) of track, which ran through Cascade Station, in turn went to private funding, while the final 2.9 miles (4.7 km) along I-205 was covered by TriMet, Metro, and the City of Portland.

The Port contributed $28.3 million for construction and $20 million for terminal and road improvements; these funds were drawn from a $3 ticket fee levied on travelers. Delta Air Lines, Reno Air, and United Airlines had opposed the use of ticket fees, arguing that the extension would serve few airline passengers, but the FAA approved it in May 1999. Additional funds came from Cascade Station Development, a private consortium of Bechtel and real estate developer Trammell Crow, who provided $28.2 million for the project and $13.1 million for the construction of an interchange over I-205 and Airport Way. TriMet released $27.5 million for construction, which was funded by $30 million in bonds, and procured six new rail cars for $6 million each. Metro allocated $18 million from a regional transportation fund, and $23 million came from tax increment bonds issued by the City of Portland.

David Evans and Associates served as the prime engineer and lead designer. Much of the Airport MAX extension used public right-of-way already owned either by the Oregon Department of Transportation, the Port, or TriMet. This avoided displacing private property owners and limited the project's impact only to parking spaces at Gateway Transit Center and along Airport Way. Bechtel began construction in June 1999 on a segment next to I-205 near the Columbia Slough. Bridgework over the freeway commenced the following December. To minimize lane closures, workers used a cast-in-place concrete pouring method to extend the bridges' spans in 16-foot (4.9 m) increments. Work progressed quickly along the freeway segment due to the existing I-205 busway right-of-way, which came with a tunnel from Gateway Transit Center to the freeway median. Bechtel contracted track installation to Stacy and Witbeck, whose workers placed 3,200 feet (975.4 m) of rail per day to meet the project's deadline; tracks from Gateway Transit Center to the bridge over southbound I-205 were laid by July 2000. Hoffman Construction built the $8.4 million Portland Airport station, and local architecture firm Zimmer Gunsul Frasca (ZGF) designed the station's glass-roofed shelter to complement the airport terminal's drop-off canopy, which ZGF also designed. Bechtel began the end-to-end testing of the power, trains, and signals in March 2001, and TriMet took over the project that July to continue system testing and verify scheduling.

=== Opening and extension to Beaverton ===
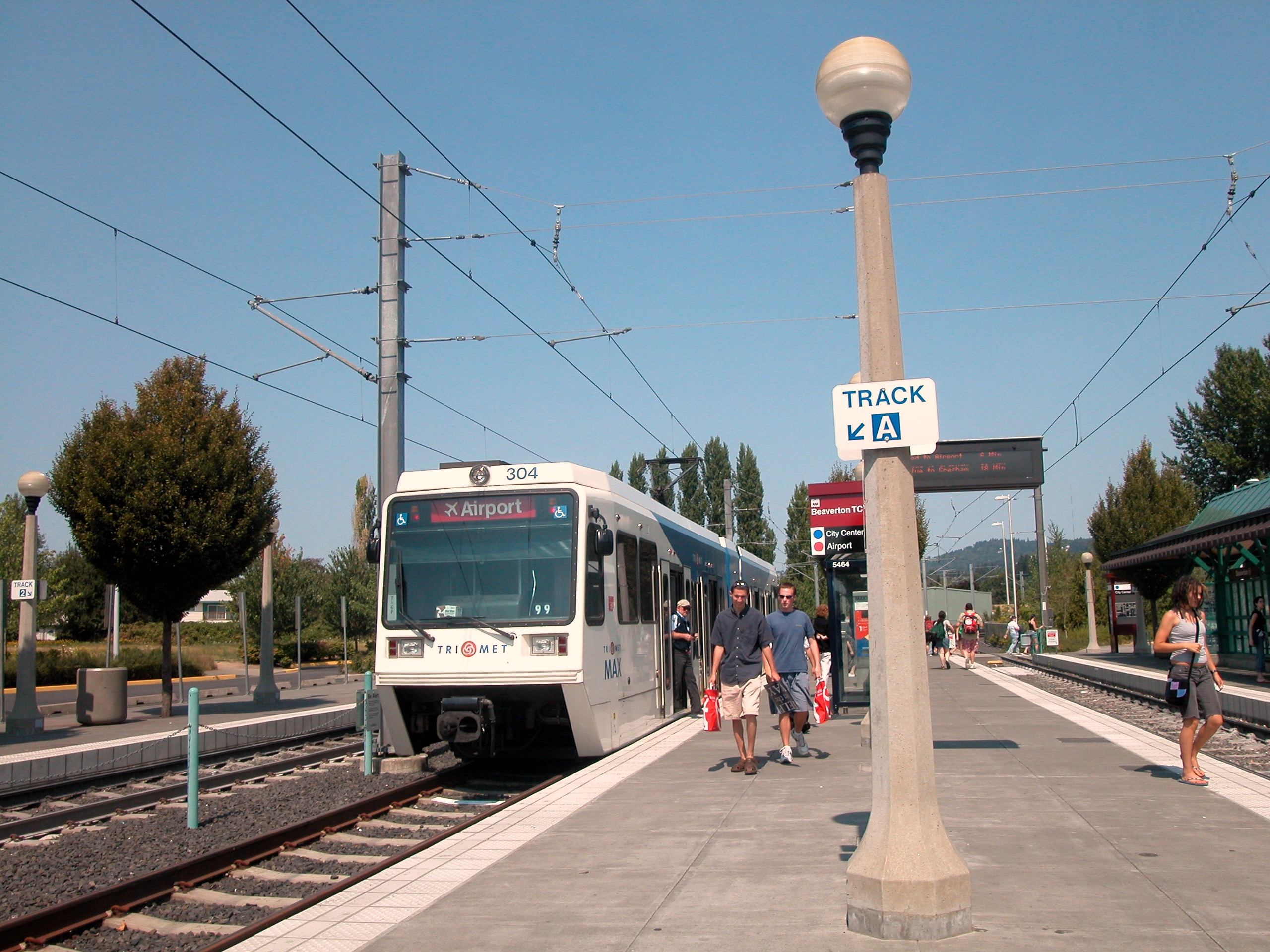
A Red Line train at Beaverton Transit Center in 2004

In 2000, TriMet named the new MAX service to the airport the "Red Line" to differentiate it from the established service between Hillsboro and Gresham, which it renamed the "Blue Line". The Airport MAX extension opened on September 10, 2001. Celebrations scheduled for September 15–16 were canceled in the aftermath of the September 11 attacks, with the airport itself closed for three days due to a nationwide ground stop. Upon opening, the Red Line operated from the airport to the Library and Galleria stations in downtown Portland, where its trains turned around at the 11th Avenue loop tracks. It replaced bus route 12–Sandy Boulevard as TriMet's only service to and from the airport, while the transit agency for Clark County, Washington, C-Tran, rerouted its bus service from its connection at Gateway Transit Center to Parkrose/Sumner Transit Center. Although tested during trial runs, TriMet opted to omit luggage racks from Red Line trains to maximize rider capacity. By November 2001, ridership had averaged 2,300 riders and peaked at 3,800 riders a day before the Thanksgiving holiday weekend. At the time, service had been using single light rail cars, but the influx of riders prompted TriMet to temporarily deploy two-car consists, which it had not planned to do until 2006.

On September 1, 2003, TriMet extended Red Line service farther west via the Westside MAX segment to Beaverton Transit Center. This was done in an effort to increase capacity between Gateway Transit Center and Beaverton and to provide a one-seat ride to the airport for the west side. Regular use of two-car trains on the line began in September 2005, when overcrowding prompted TriMet to change most Yellow Line service from two-car consists to single cars in order to convert the Red Line to two-car trains. In March 2008, three trips in each direction during the morning and evening rush hours began operating between the Hatfield Government Center and Portland Airport stations to provide further capacity on the Blue Line.

=== Track improvements and extension to Hillsboro ===
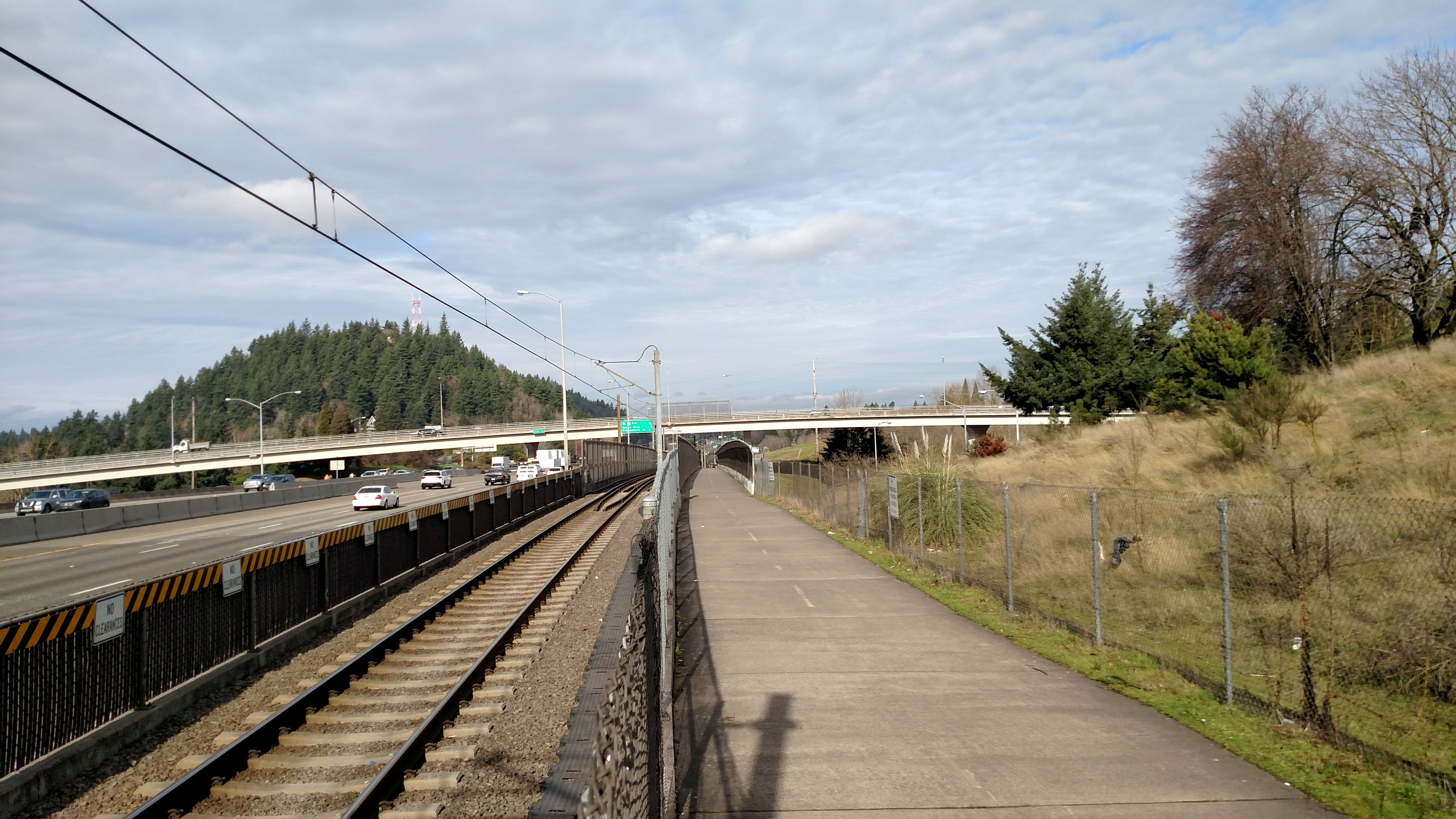
A single-track segment of the Airport MAX along I-205 in 2018. Since January 2024, this formerly bidirectional section of track is used solely by Portland Airport-bound trains.

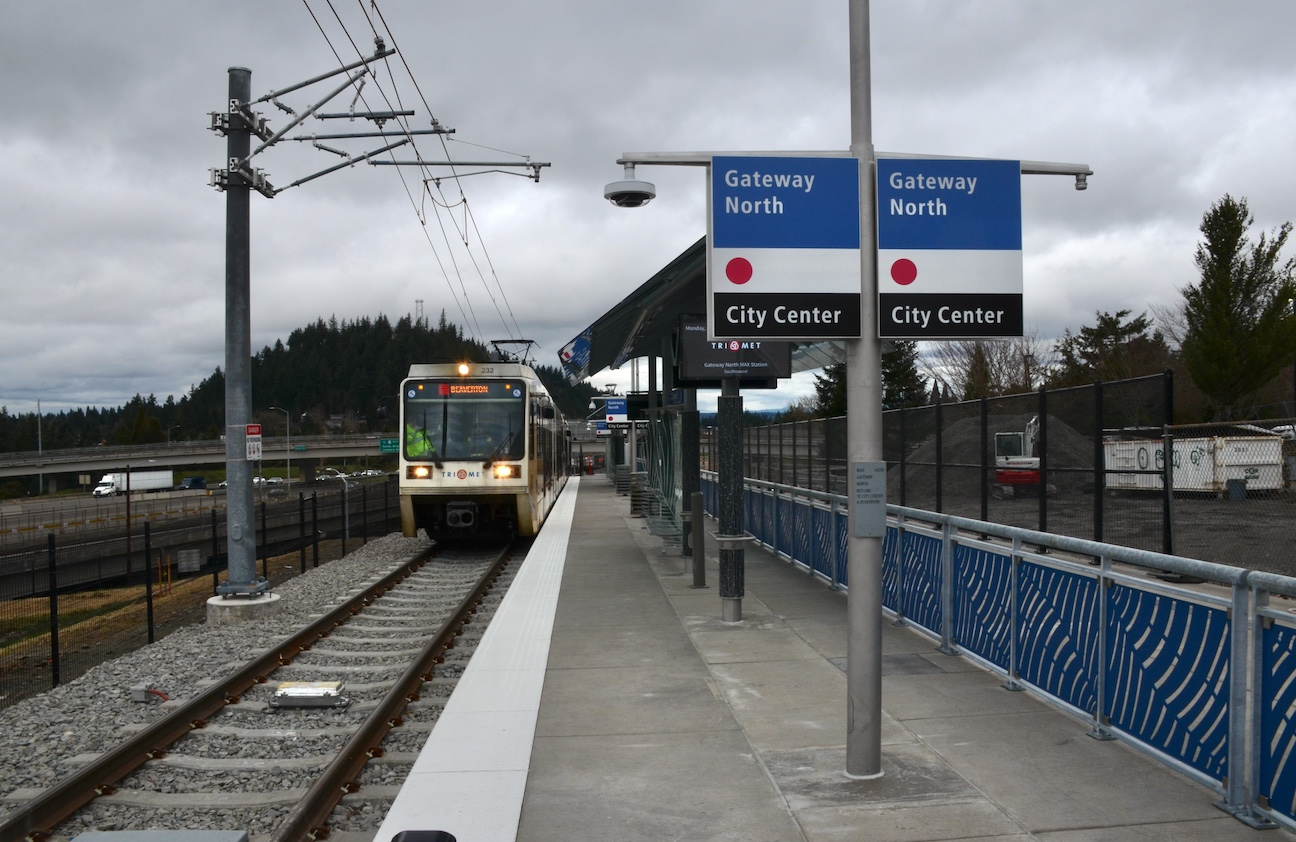
Gateway North station on opening day, March 2024

In October 2017, TriMet, citing system-wide delays caused by two single-track segments on the Airport MAX, announced the MAX Red Line Improvements Project, later renamed "A Better Red". A Better Red proposed double-tracking a 2,800-foot (850 m) section of track north of Gateway Transit Center and another 3,800-foot (1,200 m) section next to Northeast Airport Way, just before the airport terminal. To qualify the project for federal funding, TriMet also announced extending Red Line service west to Fair Complex/Hillsboro Airport station in Hillsboro, again using the Westside MAX segment; this would create a one-seat option from 10 additional stations to Portland International Airport. Additionally, TriMet had announced it would procure up to eight new light rail vehicles to accommodate the improvements, but later purchased 30 new trains overall; four were part of A Better Red, while the remaining 26 were replacements for the original MAX fleet, which are gradually being retired.

Preliminary design work began in February 2018, and TriMet adopted a locally preferred alternative in April 2019. Final design was completed by engineering firm Parametrix in early 2021. The design included two new bridges north of Gateway Transit Center to accommodate the second track and a new MAX platform just north of Gateway Transit Center called "Gateway North". The project cost $215 million. In May 2020, the FTA announced $99.99 million for the project through the Capital Investment Grants program. $104 million from TriMet, $8.9 million from Metro, and $2.2 million from the Port covered the local-matching funds.

The project broke ground on September 28, 2021. From April 2–9, 2022, Red Line service was suspended to make way for construction, and shuttle buses operated between Gateway Transit Center and Portland International Airport. The project was completed in March 2024.

From June 18 to October 21, 2023, TriMet suspended MAX service between Gateway Transit Center and the airport to allow for construction of the second track between the airport and Mount Hood Ave.

From January 14 to March 3, 2024, TriMet suspended MAX Red, Blue and Green Line service between NE 7th and Gateway Transit Center. Inbound Red Line trains from PDX began serving Gateway North on March 4, 2024. These projects eliminated the last bidirectional single-track sections on the MAX system.

The Red Line extension to Hillsboro began service on August 25, 2024 with a soft launch, with the full launch beginning on August 28. Fair Complex/Hillsboro Airport station was also renamed to Hillsboro Airport/Fairgrounds station. On the destination signs of westbound trains, where space is limited, the new destination was initially shown as "HIO/Fairgnd", HIO being the International Air Transport Association code for Hillsboro Airport, before being changed to a display alternating between "Hills Airprt" and "Fairgrounds". The opposite end of the Red Line continues to be shown simply as "Airport" (referring to Portland International) on the trains' destination signs.

== Route ==
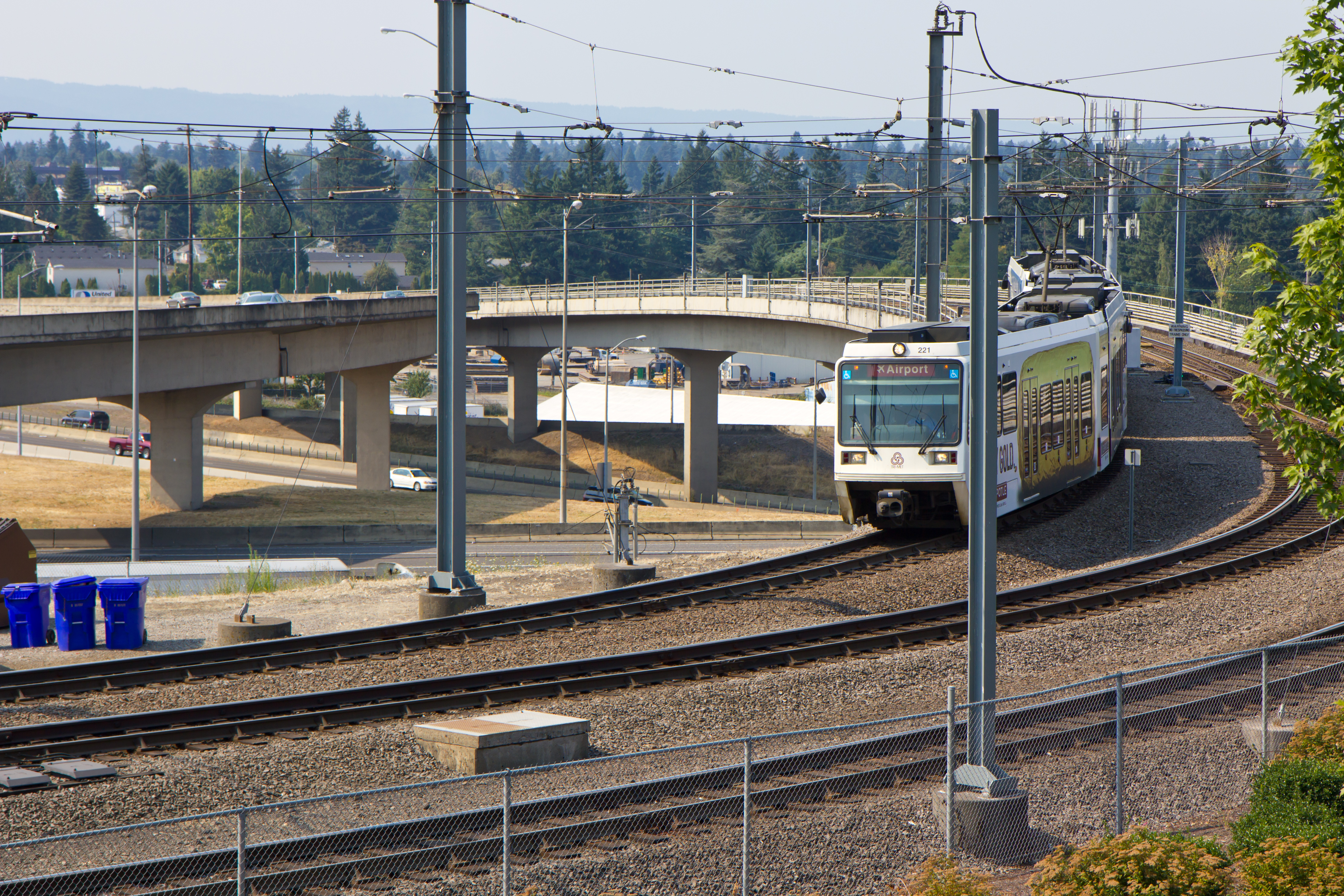
An airport-bound MAX train running above I-205, pictured in 2011

The Red Line serves the 5.5-mile (8.9 km) Airport MAX segment. This segment begins just south of Gateway Transit Center where it branches from the Eastside MAX segment, makes a 180-degree loop, and heads north along the east side of the I-205 freeway. Near Rocky Butte, it enters a tunnel beneath the northbound lanes of the freeway and emerges along the median. The line then crosses over the southbound lanes of I-205 just south of the Columbia Slough and proceeds northwest along the south side of Cascade Parkway. It follows this road then crosses it just before Mount Hood Ave station. The line then continues northwest along the south side of Airport Way until it reaches its terminus at Portland Airport station.

Beyond the Airport MAX, the Red Line serves parts of the Westside and Eastside MAX segments, sharing sections of track with the Blue Line from Hillsboro Airport/Fairgrounds station to Gateway Transit Center and the Green Line from Rose Quarter Transit Center to Gateway Transit Center.

A geographic map of the MAX Red Line (in red) relative to the rest of the network (in black) with icons marking the line's termini. (Note: The official system schematic can be viewed on the TriMet website.)

=== Stations ===
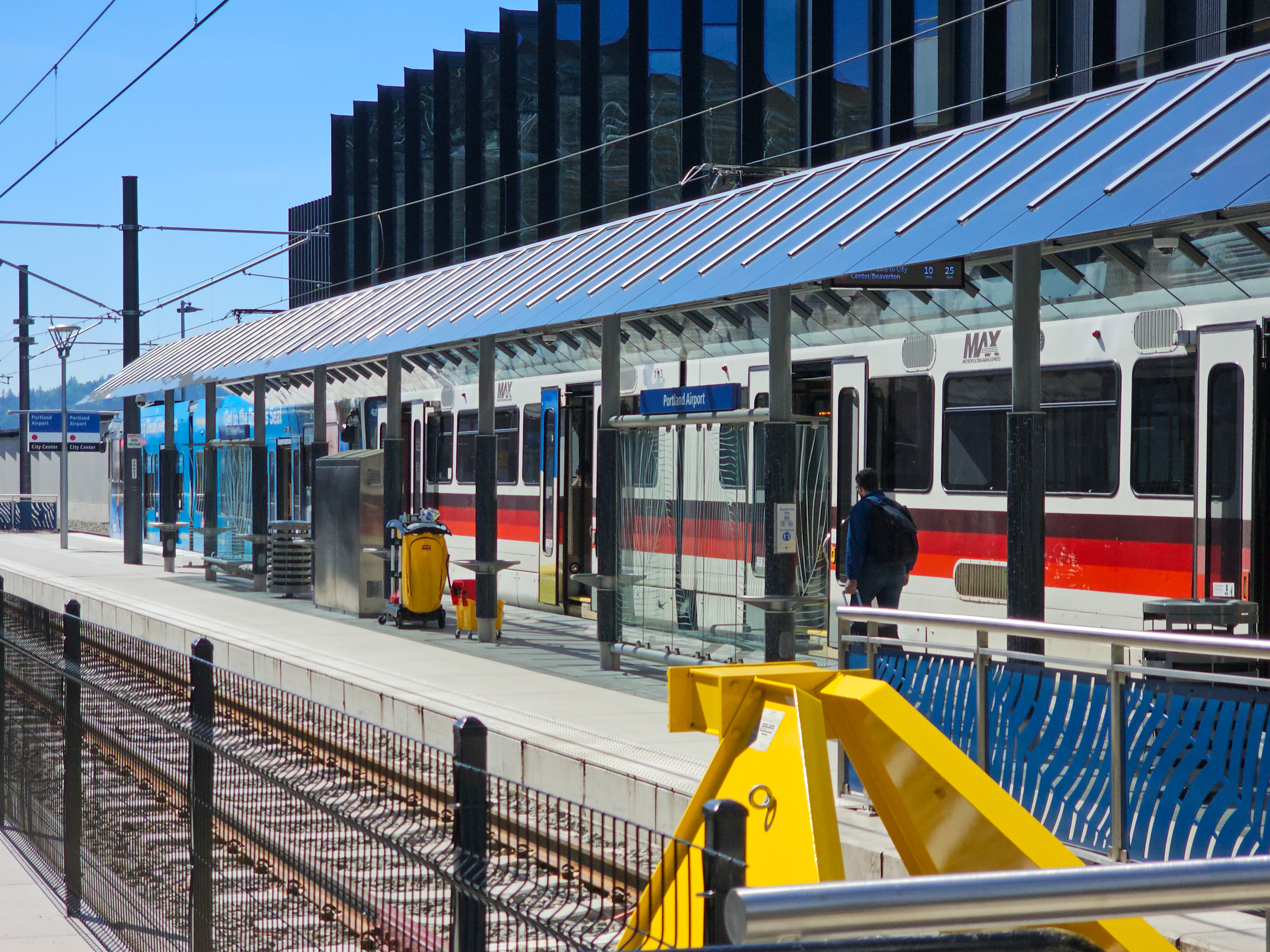
Portland Airport station, the Red Line's eastern terminus, pictured in 2024

The Airport MAX project added four stations to the MAX system: Portland Airport, Mount Hood Ave, Cascades, and Parkrose/Sumner Transit Center. In March 2024, Gateway North opened as part of A Better Red. The Red Line serves a total of 36 stations, including these five, and shares the 31 other stations, from Hillsboro Airport/Fairgrounds to Gateway Transit Center, with the Blue Line.

Riders can transfer to the Green Line at Gateway Transit Center, from the Pioneer Square stations to the Orange and Yellow lines at the Pioneer Courthouse and Pioneer Place stations, and from Rose Quarter Transit Center to the Yellow Line at Interstate/Rose Quarter station. The Library and Galleria, Convention Center, and NE 7th Ave stations connect with the Portland Streetcar, Beaverton Transit Center connects with WES Commuter Rail, and many stations connect with local and intercity bus services.

Key
Icon	Purpose
→	Portland Airport-bound travel only
←	Hillsboro-bound travel only

List of MAX Red Line stations
Station	Connections	Began service	Location
Hillsboro Airport/Fairgrounds	Blue Line	August 25, 2024	Hillsboro
Hawthorn Farm	Blue Line	August 25, 2024	Hillsboro
Orenco	Blue Line	August 25, 2024	Hillsboro
Quatama	Blue Line	August 25, 2024	Hillsboro
Willow Creek/SW 185th Ave Transit Center	Blue Line	August 25, 2024	Hillsboro
Elmonica/SW 170th Ave	Blue Line	August 25, 2024	Beaverton
Merlo Rd/SW 158th Ave	Blue Line	August 25, 2024	Beaverton
Beaverton Creek	Blue Line	August 25, 2024	Beaverton
Millikan Way	Blue Line	August 25, 2024	Beaverton
Beaverton Central	Blue Line	August 25, 2024	Beaverton
Beaverton Transit Center	Blue Line; WES Commuter Rail	September 1, 2003	Beaverton
Sunset Transit Center	Blue Line	September 1, 2003	Beaverton
Washington Park	Blue Line	September 1, 2003	Portland
Goose Hollow/SW Jefferson St	Blue Line	September 1, 2003	Portland
Providence Park	Blue Line	September 1, 2003	Portland
Library/SW 9th Ave→	Blue Line; A Loop (at Central Library); B Loop (at SW 11th & Taylor); NS Line (at Central Library and SW 11th & Taylor)	September 10, 2001	Portland
Galleria/SW 10th Ave←	Blue Line; A Loop (at SW 10th & Alder); B Loop (at SW 11th & Alder); NS Line (at SW 10th & Alder and SW 11th & Alder)	September 10, 2001	Portland
Pioneer Square South→	Blue Line; Orange Line (at Pioneer Courthouse/SW 6th and Pioneer Place/SW 5th); Yellow Line (at Pioneer Courthouse/SW 6th and Pioneer Place/SW 5th); Portland Transit Mall	September 10, 2001	Portland
Pioneer Square North←	Blue Line; Orange Line (at Pioneer Courthouse/SW 6th and Pioneer Place/SW 5th); Yellow Line (at Pioneer Courthouse/SW 6th and Pioneer Place/SW 5th); Portland Transit Mall	September 10, 2001	Portland
Yamhill District→	Blue Line	September 10, 2001	Portland
Morrison/SW 3rd Ave←	Blue Line	September 10, 2001	Portland
Oak St/SW 1st Ave	Blue Line	September 10, 2001	Portland
Old Town/Chinatown	Blue Line	September 10, 2001	Portland
Rose Quarter Transit Center	Blue Line; Yellow Line (at Interstate/Rose Quarter)	September 10, 2001	Portland
Convention Center	Blue Line; B Loop (at NE Grand & Holladay)	September 10, 2001	Portland
NE 7th Ave	Blue Line; A Loop (at NE 7th & Holladay)	September 10, 2001	Portland
Lloyd Center/NE 11th Ave	Blue Line	September 10, 2001	Portland
Hollywood/NE 42nd Ave	Blue Line	September 10, 2001	Portland
NE 60th Ave	Blue Line	September 10, 2001	Portland
NE 82nd Ave	Blue Line	September 10, 2001	Portland
Gateway/NE 99th Ave Transit Center→	Blue Line; Green Line	September 10, 2001	Portland
Gateway North←	Blue Line (at Gateway/NE 99th Ave Transit Center); Green Line (at Gateway/NE 99th Ave Transit Center)	March 4, 2024	Portland
Parkrose/Sumner Transit Center		September 10, 2001	Portland
Cascades		c. January 2007	Portland
Mt Hood Ave		September 10, 2001	Portland
Portland Airport		September 10, 2001	Portland

List of former MAX Red Line stations
Station	Location	Began service	Ceased service	Reason
Kings Hill/SW Salmon St	Portland	September 1, 2003	March 1, 2020	Stations closed on March 1, 2020
Mall/SW 4th Ave	Portland	September 10, 2001	March 1, 2020	Stations closed on March 1, 2020
Mall/SW 5th Ave	Portland	September 10, 2001	March 1, 2020	Stations closed on March 1, 2020
Skidmore Fountain	Portland	September 10, 2001	August 24, 2025	Station closed on August 24, 2025

== Service ==
TriMet designates the Red Line as a "Frequent Service" route, with trains running every 15 minutes during most of the day, although headways increase to 30 minutes during the early morning and evening hours. Red Line trains operate daily from 3:19 am to 1:43 am the next day. End-to-end travel from Hillsboro Airport/Fairgrounds station to Portland Airport station takes just over one hour.

On September 2, 2018, TriMet reintroduced bus service to the airport, which had been replaced by the Red Line since 2001, with route 272–PDX Night Bus. Service ran in the late night and early morning hours when the Red Line was not operating. It traveled from the airport via Airport Way and 82nd Avenue to a local bus stop near Southeast 80th and Washington streets. Route 272 was suspended on April 5, 2020, as a result of the COVID-19 pandemic. It was reinstated on August 25, 2024, as route 292–Red Bus. Route 292 travels a longer route than its predecessor with service through Southeast Portland and downtown, terminating at Goose Hollow/SW Jefferson St station.

=== Ridership ===
The Red Line averaged 15,574 riders on weekdays in 2025. One year after opening, the line averaged 2,800 daily riders at the airport, ahead of TriMet's first-year projections of 2,300. The Red Line's extension to Beaverton Transit Center in 2003 increased weekday ridership by 49 percent along the Westside MAX corridor and six percent systemwide.

IKEA's opening in July 2007 helped attract more riders to Cascade Station shopping center, which had been considered a failed planned development following the economic recession caused by the September 11 attacks. In 2008, Cascades MAX station recorded an eight-fold increase in traffic, from 250 passengers per week to 2,000, and this figure had further grown to 6,000 by 2010. The Red Line's annual ridership peaked at just over nine million passengers in 2009, and it continued to fall over the next decade as part of a system-wide decline attributed to crime and rising housing costs in the Portland area. From 8.2 million boardings in 2012, 7.4 million boardings were recorded in 2015.

The COVID-19 pandemic, which impacted public transit ridership globally, further exacerbated the line's—and TriMet's overall—ridership decline. From an average 22,530 weekday riders in September 2019, TriMet recorded just 6,500 riders in April 2020 following local stay-at-home orders.
