= Madison South, Portland, Oregon =

Madison South
- Neighborhood
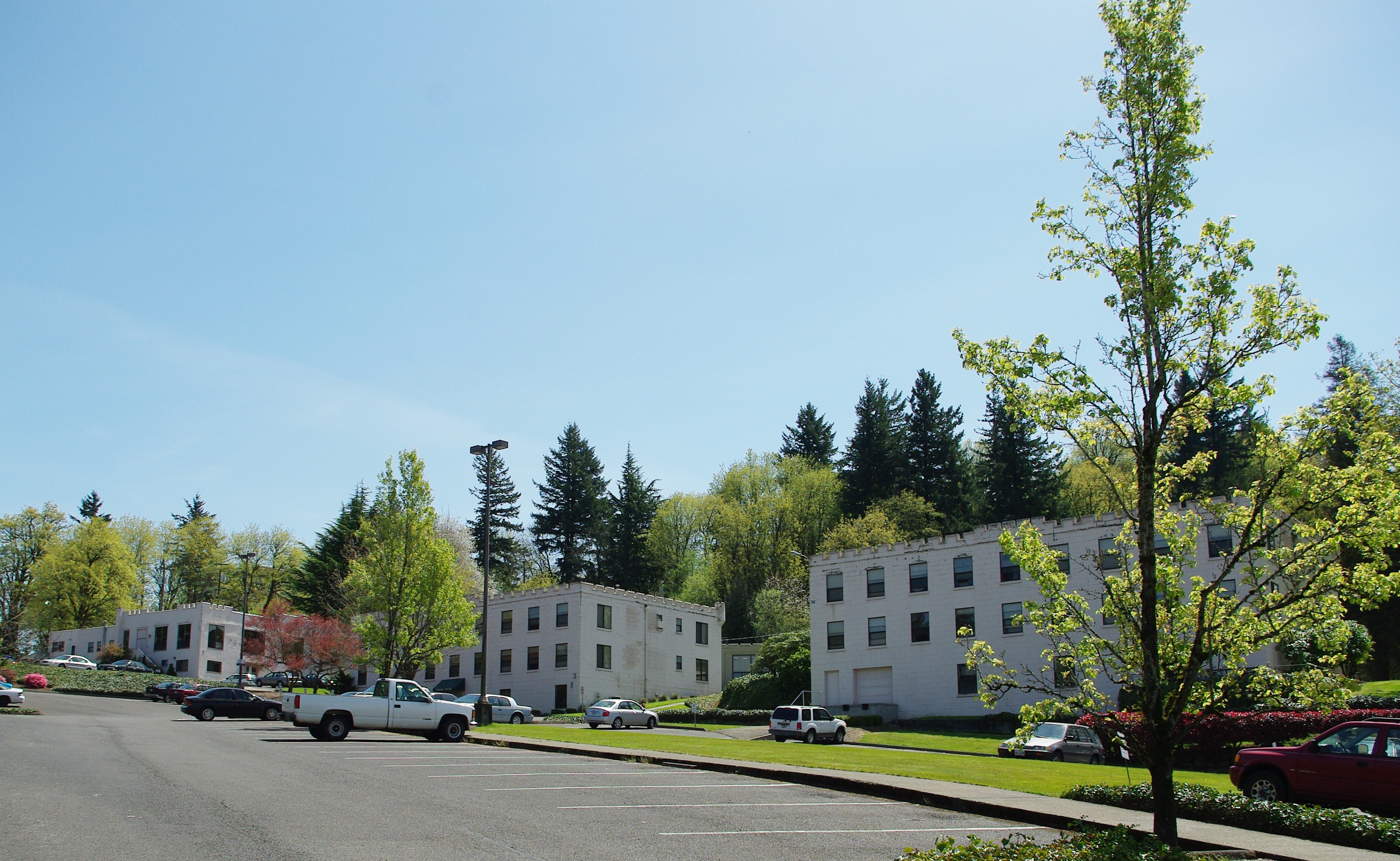
- Bible college campus in Portland, Oregon
- Interactive map of Madison South
- Coordinates: 45°32′27″N 122°34′35″W
- Country: United States
- State: Oregon
- City: Portland

Government
  - Association: Madison South Neighborhood Association
  - Coalition: Central Northeast Neighbors, Inc.

Area
  - Total: 1.50 sq mi (3.88 km^{2})

Population (2000)
  - Total: 6,918
  - Density: 4,620/sq mi (1,780/km^{2})

Housing
  - No. of households: 2538
  - Occupancy rate: 96% occupied
  - Owner-occupied: 1486 households (59%)
  - Renting: 1052 households (41%)
  - Avg. household size: 2.73 persons

Madison South is a neighborhood in the Northeast section of Portland, Oregon. It is bordered by the Roseway, Sumner, Cully, Parkrose, Montavilla, and Rose City Park neighborhoods, and by the enclave city of Maywood Park. The neighborhood roughly conforms to the boundaries of Interstate 84 to the south, Interstate 205 to the east, NE Sandy Boulevard to the north, and NE 65th Avenue to the west.

Notable features of Madison South include Rocky Butte, an inactive volcanic cinder cone; the Grotto, a Catholic nature sanctuary; and the Alameda Ridge, a gravel bar left over from the Missoula Floods. Notable structures include McDaniel High School, Roseway Heights Middle School, the MAX Light Rail NE 82nd Ave Station, and the former international headquarters of Banfield Pet Hospitals.
