= List of MAX Light Rail stations =

Stops on the TriMet-operated system

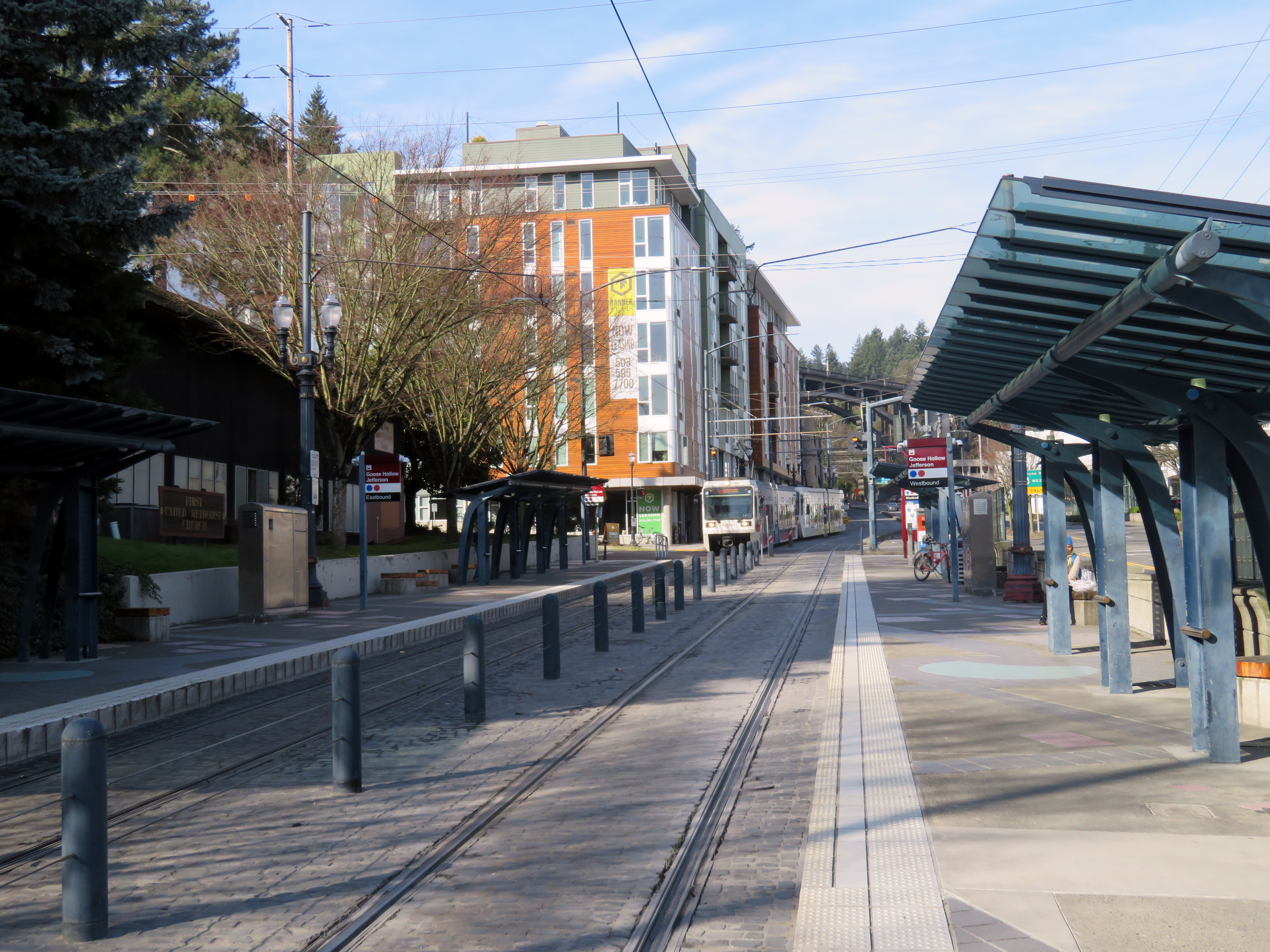
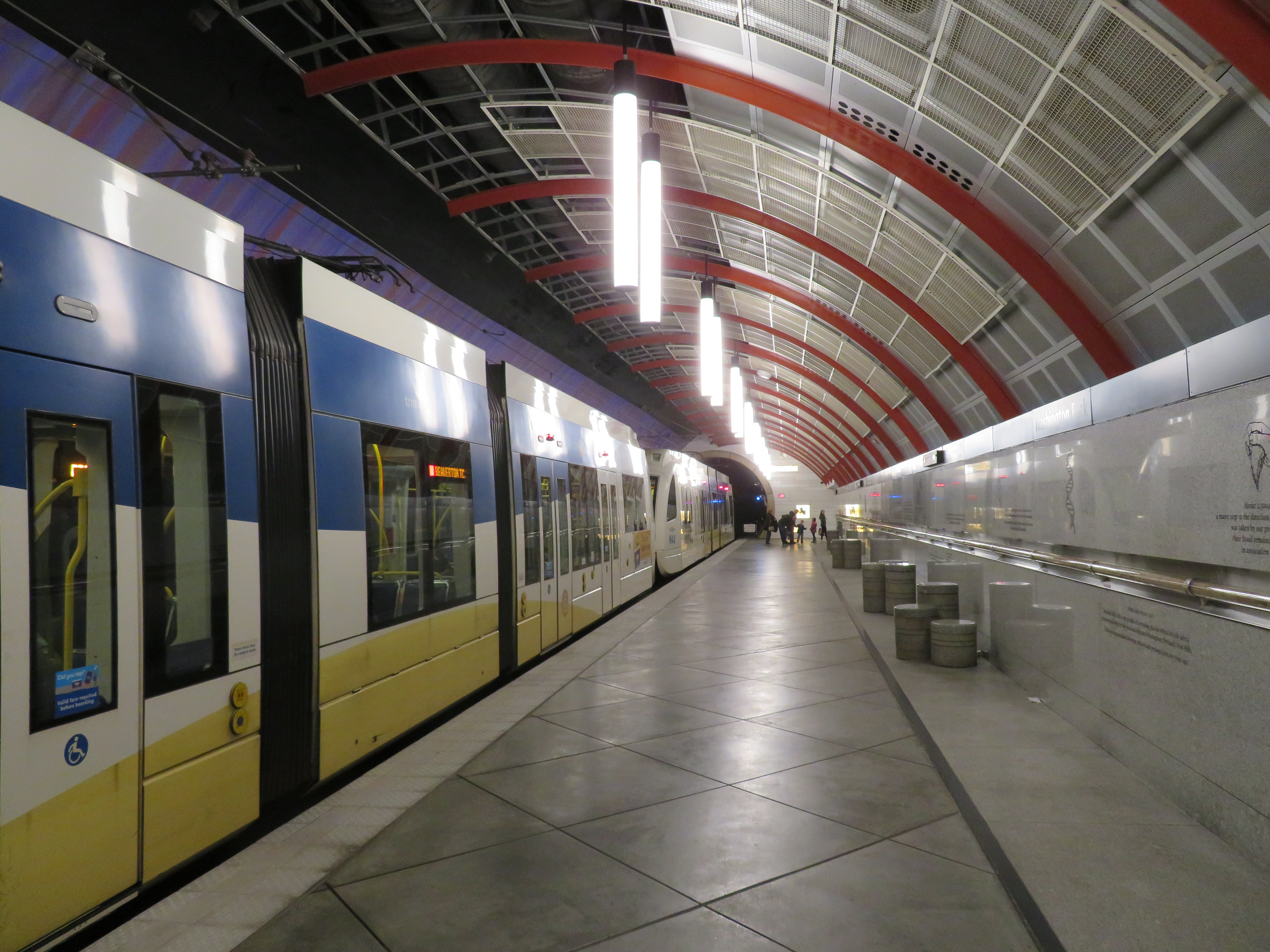
Goose Hollow/Southwest Jefferson Street station and Washington Park station: in-ground and underground, as well as island and split-platform, respectively. Both stations serve the Blue and Red Lines.

Metropolitan Area Express (MAX) is a light rail transit system serving the Portland metropolitan area, Oregon, United States. The system is operated by TriMet, a public agency that operates public transit in the Portland area. Serving an average of 130,000 passengers a day (in Fiscal Year 2012), MAX Light Rail is one of the largest light rail systems in the United States in terms of ridership.

The MAX system currently consists of five lines, each designated by a color.

Blue Line: Hillsboro – City Center – Gresham
Green Line: Clackamas – City Center – Portland State University
Orange Line: Union Station – City Center – Portland State University – Milwaukie
Red Line: Portland International Airport – City Center – Hillsboro Airport/Fairgrounds station
Yellow Line: Expo Center – City Center – Portland State University

MAX Light Rail began service on September 5, 1986 with the opening of the original segment from Downtown Portland to Gresham. An extension westward to Beaverton and Hillsboro opened in 1998. The resulting 33-mile east-west line has always been operated as a single through route, and it became known as the Blue Line in 2001, after TriMet adopted color designations for its separate light rail routes after the Red Line opened to the airport. The Yellow Line branch to the Expo Center opened in 2004. In 2009, the Green Line opened, serving the Portland Transit Mall (along with the rerouted Yellow Line) and the new I-205 branch to Clackamas.

The system currently has a total of 93 stations, minus 3 which closed in March 2020 and another in August 2025. 50 stations are served by the Blue Line, 28 stations by the Green Line, 17 by the Orange Line, 28 by the Red Line, and 17 by the Yellow Line, with 39 stations served by two or more lines and 8 by three. All trains connect at Pioneer Courthouse Square.

Since 2012, there is a flat fare for the entire TriMet system. Prior to 2012, fares on the MAX system were zonal (i.e. distance-based), the same as on TriMet's bus service. The center of downtown was called Fareless Square (later the "Free Rail Zone") and included the area from the Library and Galleria stations to the Old Town/Chinatown station. This was later expanded across the Steel Bridge into the Lloyd District as far as Lloyd Center/Northeast 11th Avenue station, and Interstate/Rose Quarter station. When the Portland Transit Mall was remodeled in 2009 to accommodate light rail, all stations on the transit mall were included as part of Fareless Square. Moving out from the center of downtown, Zone 1 included the Albina/Mississippi station on the Yellow Line, and from Providence Park to Washington Park on the Red and Blue lines. Zone 2 consisted of the rest of the Yellow Line (from Overlook Park to the Expo Center) as well as the three stations next to Interstate 84 (Hollywood/Northeast 42nd Avenue station, Northeast 60th Avenue station, and Northeast 82nd Avenue station). Zone 3 consisted of all other MAX stations, including all stations in Washington County and all stations beyond the Gateway/NE 99th Avenue Transit Center.

== Stations ==
†	Terminals
^{<}	Westbound/southbound-only stations
^{>}	Eastbound/northbound-only stations

Station	Lines	Transit connections	Year opened	Park & ride	Image
Albina/Mississippi	Yellow Line	35, 40	2004	—N/a	
Beaverton Central	Blue Line Red Line		1998	—N/a	
Beaverton Creek	Blue Line Red Line		1998	417 spaces	
Beaverton Transit Center	Blue Line Red Line	WES Commuter Rail; 20, 52, 53, 54, 57, 58, 76, 78, 88	1998	—N/a	
Cascades	Red Line		2007	—N/a	
City Hall/SW 5th & Jefferson^{<}	Green Line Orange Line	Transit Mall	2009	—N/a	
Civic Drive	Blue Line		2010	—N/a	
Clackamas Town Center Transit Center†	Green Line	29, 30, 33, 34, 71, 72, 79, 152, 155, 156	2009	750 spaces	
Cleveland Ave†	Blue Line		1986	392 spaces	
Clinton St/SE 12th Ave	Orange Line	9, 17, 70	2015	—N/a	
Convention Center	Blue Line Green Line Red Line	6	1990	—N/a	
Delta Park/Vanport	Yellow Line	6 (southbound only); C-Tran: 60	2004	304 spaces	
E 102nd Ave	Blue Line	15, 20	1986	—N/a	
E 122nd Ave	Blue Line	73	1986	612 spaces	
E 148th Ave	Blue Line	86	1986	—N/a	
E 162nd Ave	Blue Line	74	1986	—N/a	
E 172nd Ave	Blue Line		1986	—N/a	
E 181st Ave	Blue Line	87	1986	247 spaces	
Elmonica/SW 170th Ave	Blue Line Red Line		1998	435 spaces	
Expo Center†	Yellow Line	11	2004	300 spaces	
Galleria/SW 10th Ave^{<}	Blue Line Red Line	Portland Streetcar: ABNS	1986	—N/a	
Gateway/NE 99th Ave Transit Center	Blue Line Green Line Red Line (eastbound only)	15, 19, 22, 23, 24, 25, 87; CAT: Columbia Gorge Express	1986	690 spaces	
Gateway North^{<}	Red Line		2024	—N/a	
Goose Hollow/SW Jefferson St	Blue Line Red Line	6, 58	1998	—N/a	
Gresham Central Transit Center	Blue Line	FX, 9, 20, 21, 81, 82, 84; SAM: Gresham Express	1986	540 spaces	
Gresham City Hall	Blue Line	21	1986	417 spaces	
Hatfield Government Center†	Blue Line		1998	250 spaces	
Hawthorn Farm	Blue Line Red Line		1998	—N/a	
Hillsboro Airport/Fairgrounds† (formerly Fair Complex/Hillsboro Airport)	Blue Line Red Line	46	1998	396 spaces	
Hillsboro Central/SE 3rd Ave Transit Center	Blue Line	46 47, 48, 57; YCTA: 33	1998	—N/a	
Hillsboro Health District (formerly Tuality Hospital/SE 8th Ave)	Blue Line		1998	—N/a	
Hollywood/NE 42nd Ave (formerly Hollywood/NE 42nd Ave Transit Center)	Blue Line Green Line Red Line	75, 77	1986	—N/a	
Interstate/Rose Quarter	Yellow Line	35	2004	—N/a	
Kenton/N Denver Ave	Yellow Line		2004	—N/a	
Kings Hill/SW Salmon St (closed 2020)	Blue Line Red Line	51, 63	1997	—	
Lents Town Center/SE Foster Rd	Green Line	10, 14, 73	2009	—N/a	
Library/SW 9th Ave^{>}	Blue Line Red Line	Portland Streetcar: ABNS	1986	—N/a	
Lincoln St/SW 3rd Ave	Orange Line	9, 17	2015	—N/a	
Lloyd Center/NE 11th Ave	Blue Line Green Line Red Line	70	1986	—N/a	
Mall/SW 4th Ave^{>} (closed 2020)	Blue Line Red Line	Transit Mall	1990	—	
Mall/SW 5th Ave^{<} (closed 2020)	Blue Line Red Line	Transit Mall	1990	—	
Merlo Rd/SW 158th Ave	Blue Line Red Line	67	1998	—N/a	
Millikan Way	Blue Line Red Line	62	1998	400 spaces	
Milwaukie/Main St	Orange Line	29, 32, 33, 34	2015	—N/a	
Morrison/SW 3rd Ave^{<}	Blue Line Red Line		1986	—N/a	
Mt Hood Ave	Red Line		2001	—N/a	
N Killingsworth St	Yellow Line	72	2004	—N/a	
North Lombard Transit Center	Yellow Line	4, 75	2004	—N/a	
N Prescott St	Yellow Line		2004	—N/a	
NE 7th Ave	Blue Line Green Line Red Line	Portland Streetcar: AB	1986	—N/a	
NE 60th Ave	Blue Line Green Line Red Line	71	1986	—N/a	
NE 82nd Ave	Blue Line Green Line Red Line	72, 77	1986	—N/a	
NW 5th & Couch^{<}	Green Line Orange Line	Transit Mall	2009	—N/a	
NW 6th & Davis^{>}	Green Line Yellow Line	Transit Mall	2009	—N/a	
Oak St/SW 1st Ave	Blue Line Red Line	16	1986	—N/a	
Old Town/Chinatown	Blue Line Red Line	4, 8, 16, 35, 44, 77	1986	—N/a	
OMSI/SE Water	Orange Line	9, 17; Portland Streetcar: AB	2015	—N/a	
Orenco (formerly Orenco/NW 231st Avenue)	Blue Line Red Line	47	1998	180 spaces	
Overlook Park	Yellow Line		2004	—N/a	
Parkrose/Sumner Transit Center	Red Line	12, 21, 71, 73; C-Tran: 65	2001	193 spaces	
Pioneer Courthouse/SW 6th^{>}	Green Line Yellow Line	Transit Mall	2009	—N/a	
Pioneer Place/SW 5th^{<}	Green Line Orange Line	Transit Mall	2009	—N/a	
Pioneer Square North^{<}	Blue Line Red Line	Transit Mall	1986	—N/a	
Pioneer Square South^{>}	Blue Line Red Line	Transit Mall	1986	—N/a	
Portland Airport†	Red Line		2001	—	
Providence Park	Blue Line Red Line	15, 18, 51, 63	1997	—N/a	
PSU South/SW 5th & Jackson^{<}†	Green Line Orange Line	Transit Mall	2012	—	
PSU South/SW 6th & College^{>}†	Green Line Yellow Line	Transit Mall	2012	—	
PSU Urban Center/SW 5th & Mill^{<}	Green Line Orange Line	Transit Mall; Portland Streetcar: ABNS	2009	—N/a	
PSU Urban Center/SW 6th & Montgomery^{>}	Green Line Yellow Line	Transit Mall; Portland Streetcar: ABNS	2009	—N/a	
Quatama (formerly Quatama/NW 205th Ave)	Blue Line Red Line		1998	310 spaces	
Rockwood/East 188th Ave	Blue Line	25, 87	1986	—N/a	
Rosa Parks	Yellow Line	44	2004	—N/a	
Rose Quarter Transit Center	Blue Line Green Line Red Line	4, 8, 35, 40, 44, 77	1986	—N/a	
Ruby Junction/E 197th Ave	Blue Line		1986	—N/a	
SE 17th Ave & Holgate Blvd	Orange Line	17, 70	2015	—N/a	
SE 17th Ave & Rhine St	Orange Line	17, 70	2015	—N/a	
SE Bybee Blvd	Orange Line	19	2015	—N/a	
SE Division St	Green Line	FX	2009	—N/a	
SE Flavel St	Green Line	19	2009	—N/a	
SE Fuller Rd	Green Line		2009	630 spaces	
SE Holgate Blvd	Green Line	17	2009	125 spaces	
SE Main St	Green Line	15	2009	420 spaces	
SE Park Ave†	Orange Line	33	2015	401 spaces	
SE Powell Blvd	Green Line	9	2009	391 spaces	
SE Tacoma/Johnson Creek	Orange Line	34	2015	318 spaces	
Skidmore Fountain (closed 2025)	Blue Line Red Line	12, 19, 20	1986	—	
South Waterfront/S Moody	Orange Line	9, 17, 35, 36; Portland Streetcar: ABNS	2015	—N/a	
SW 5th & Oak^{<}	Green Line Orange Line	Transit Mall	2009	—N/a	
SW 6th & Madison^{>}	Green Line Yellow Line	Transit Mall	2009	—N/a	
SW 6th & Pine^{>}	Green Line Yellow Line	Transit Mall	2009	—N/a	
Sunset Transit Center	Blue Line Red Line	20, 48, 59, 62; The Wave: 5	1998	622 spaces	
Union Station/NW 5th & Glisan^{<}†	Green Line Orange Line	Transit Mall; Amtrak; Greyhound Lines; The Wave: 5	2009	—	
Union Station/NW 6th & Hoyt^{>}	Green Line Yellow Line	Transit Mall; Amtrak; Greyhound Lines; The Wave: 5	2009	—N/a	
Washington Park	Blue Line Red Line		1998	—N/a	
Washington/SE 12th Ave	Blue Line	47	1998	—N/a	
Willow Creek/SW 185th Ave Transit Center	Blue Line Red Line	52 59, 88; CC Rider: 2, 6	1998	595 spaces	
Yamhill District^{>}	Blue Line Red Line		1986	—N/a	
