= Rockwood, Gresham, Oregon =

Rockwood
- Neighborhood
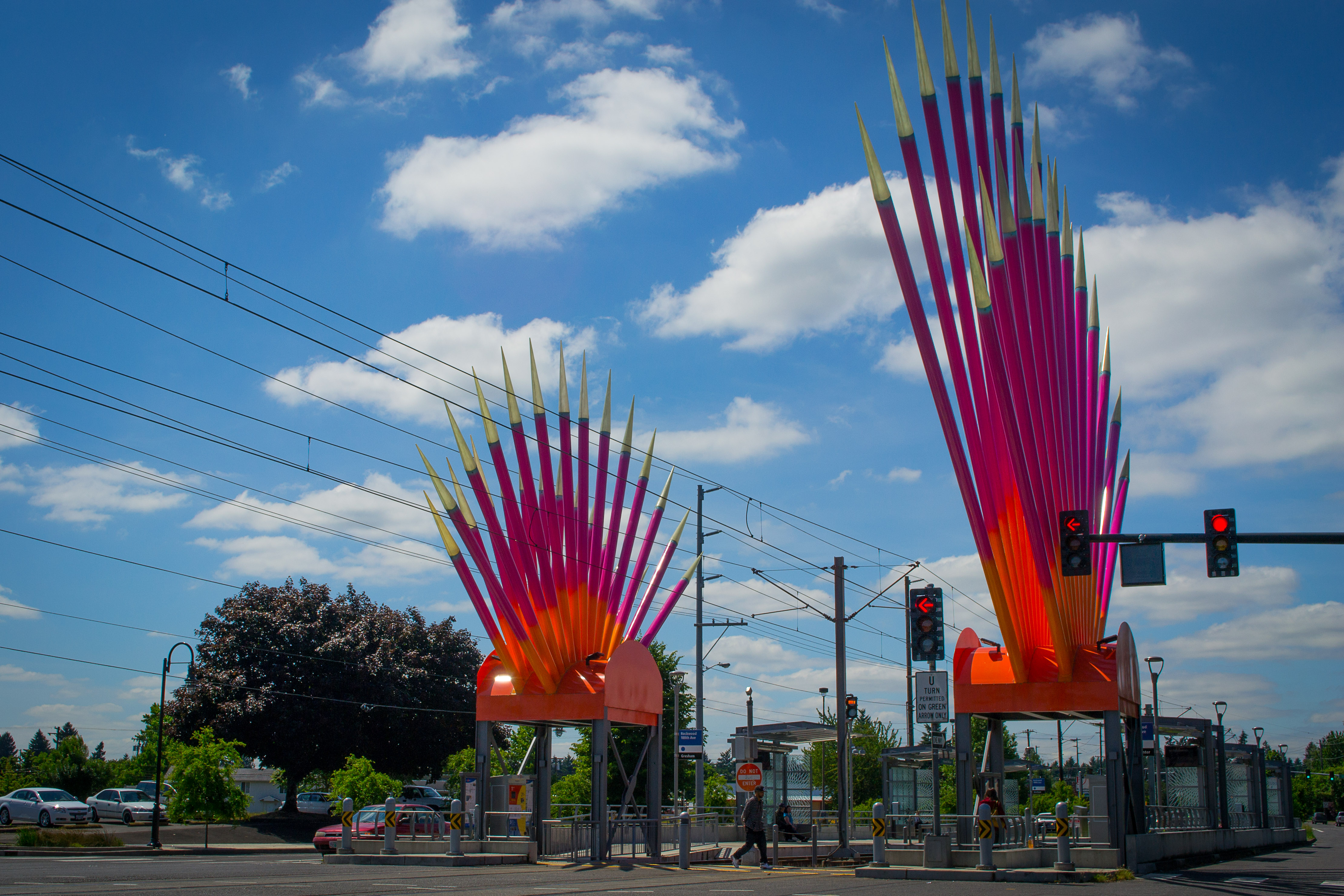
- Rockwood MAX Station
- Location in Gresham
- Coordinates: 45°31′09″N 122°28′37″E
- Country: United States
- State: Oregon
- City: Gresham
- Established: March 14, 1882

Area
  - Total: 3.58 sq mi (9.3 km^{2})

Population (2020 est.)
  - Total: 15,397
  - Density: 4,300/sq mi (1,660/km^{2})
- ZIP Code: 97230, 97233

Rockwood is a neighborhood in the northwest section of Gresham, Oregon. It is one of the most densely populated and diverse neighborhoods in Gresham, and one of the poorest in the state.

== History ==
When Oregon became a US territory in the mid-1800s, a surveyor general was directed to create a Willamette meridian and baseline to organize the area. A stone marker was placed every mile east of the courthouse in Portland along the baseline, resulting in a road called Baseline Road (present-day Stark Street). Rockwood developed at the ten-mile mark on Baseline Road where it intersected with Rockwood Road (present-day 181st Avenue). In the early 1900s, a school, a grange hall, a church, and a grocery store were established, among other businesses.

Rockwood was named by a local landowner named Francis Tegart for the rocks and Douglas firs that grew in the area, who encouraged the creation of a post office in the hopes of impressing his family abroad. On March 14, 1882, a storekeeper named Cyrus C. Lewis established Rockwood's first post office and became its first postmaster. The post office closed on February 28, 1903.

During Prohibition in the 1920s and 1930s, speakeasies and roadhouses flourished in the area, and at least five houses housed moonshiners (people making illegal alcohol).

After World War II, the area, which had previously been rural berry farms, quickly began developing, with many new commercial centers opening. In the 1950s, developers purchased much of the land for conversion into apartments. By the 1960s, Rockwood had multiple large mobile home parks. Its growth continued throughout the 1970s.

In 1986, Portland's MAX Light Rail expanded into Gresham through Rockwood, and in 1987 the City of Gresham annexed Rockwood.

== Demographics ==
The Rockwood neighborhood is situated in ZIP codes 97233 and 97230, and based on estimates from census tracts, the population is approximately 10,000 to 15,000 (though the wider area has a population of around 40,000). In greater Rockwood, around 40% of residents earn less than 200% of the federal poverty level, 20-30% do not have health insurance, and about 70% of children qualify for free or reduced lunch. Within Multnomah County, greater Rockwood ranks within the ten lowest-income ZIP codes east of the Willamette River.

Rockwood is very diverse, with residents collectively speaking over 85 languages at home. Over 60% of Rockwood Community Health Center patients are people of color, and 27.51% of the population is foreign-born, of which 48% is citizens.

== Public services ==
Since 2003, a 1,200-acre (490 ha) area of Rockwood has been included in a Gresham-Rockwood Urban Renewal Area.

Rockwood is served by the Rockwood / East 188th Avenue light rail station on the MAX Blue Line. The neighborhood has been the site of a branch of the Multnomah County Library since 1963.

In April 2010, decades after a 1960s state law required Multnomah County to provide court services in Gresham for residents east of 122nd Avenue, the county's Board of Commissioners approved a resolution that called for the construction of a courthouse in Rockwood by 2012.
