= Main Street Bridge (Hillsboro, Oregon) =

Light-rail bridge over Main and 18th Streets in Hillsboro, Oregon

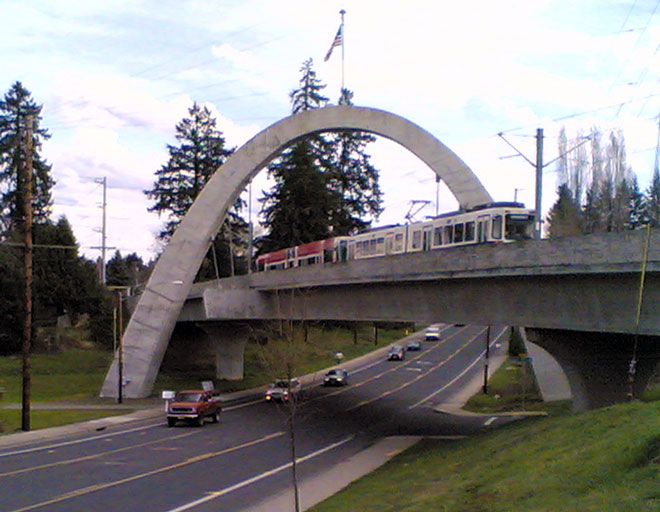
- Coordinates: 45.521416°N 122.963618°W
- Carries: MAX Blue Line
- Crosses: Main Street & 18th Avenue
- Locale: Hillsboro, Oregon, United States
- Maintained by: TriMet

Characteristics
- Design: concrete arch/tied-arch
- Total length: 425 feet (130 m)
- Width: 34 feet (10.3 m)
- Height: 75 feet (arch)

History
- Opened: 1997

Location
- Interactive map of Main Street Bridge

The Hillsboro Main Street Bridge is a concrete tied arch bridge located in Hillsboro, Oregon. The bridge carries light rail traffic on the MAX Blue Line over Main Street and 18th Street. Completed in 1997, the 425-foot-long (130 m) bridge was built with a 78-foot-tall (24 m) arch in the center. It is located between Washington/Southeast 12th Avenue station and the Hillsboro Airport/Fairgrounds station.

== Design ==
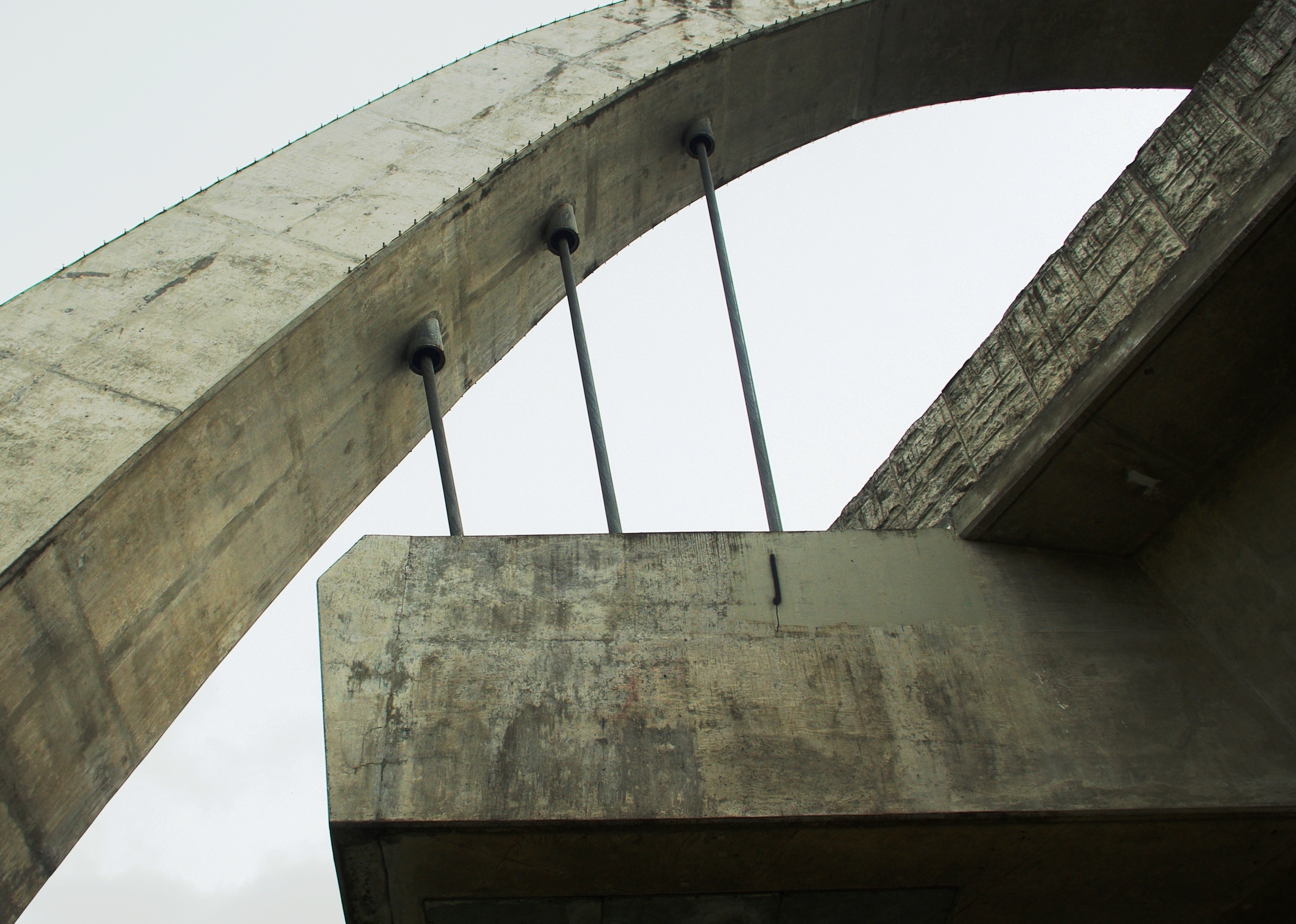
Cables connecting the arch to the rail bed

The bridge is a post-tension box girder structure with the center pier as an arch support straddling the road. Used in lieu of a center support, the arch is 110 feet (34 m) wide and 75 feet (23 m) tall. Six cables measuring four inches (102 mm) in diameter run from the arch to the main structure of the bridge at the center. The two ends of the reinforced concrete arch are connected to each other underground using a post-tension tie beam, making the structure a tied arch.

== History ==
After more than a decade of studies and designing, construction on the Westside MAX light rail line began in 1993. In 1997, construction on the Main Street Bridge began. The bridge was designed by BRW to cross what is planned to be five lanes of traffic on Main Street. The city of Hillsboro required the bridge to be able to cross over the planned widening of the roadway without using a center support column, so as to prevent the kind of accidents that had plagued a previous crossing at the same location, a wooden trestle bridge of the Oregon Electric Railway, built in 1917 with a vehicle clearance height of just 10 feet, 6 inches. After abandonment of freight service on the line in the mid-1970s, the city required the successor railroad, the Burlington Northern Railroad, to remove the old crossing, in 1977. In September 1997, the construction of the current bridge structure was completed. The "golden spike" of the Westside light rail line was driven with the final pieces of track of the project installed on this bridge in October 1997. Passenger service on the $964 million project began on September 12, 1998.
