= E 102nd Ave station =

Railway station in Portland, Oregon, United States

E 102nd Ave
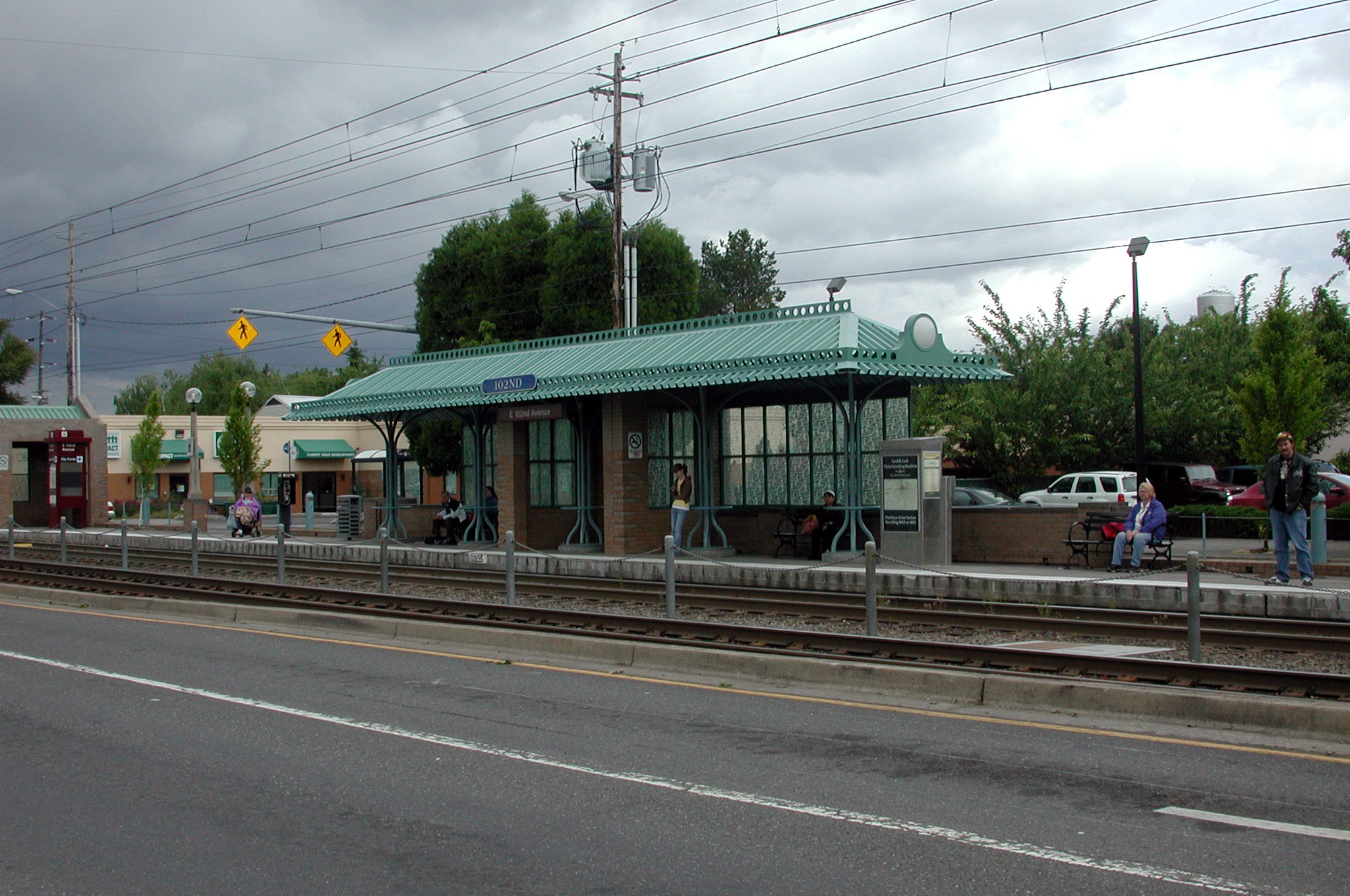
- West platform of the East 102nd Avenue station

General information
- Location: E Burnside & 102nd Ave; Portland, Oregon; USA
- Coordinates: 45°31′22″N 122°33′30″W
- Owner: TriMet
- Platforms: 2 side platforms
- Tracks: 2
- Connections: TriMet: 15, 20

Construction
- Cycle facilities: bike racks
- Accessible: Accessible to people with mobility devices

History
- Opened: September 5, 1986

Services
| Preceding station | TriMet | Following station |
|---|---|---|
| Gateway/NE 99th Ave Transit Center toward Hatfield Government Center | Blue Line | East 122nd Avenue toward Cleveland Ave |
Location

East 102nd Avenue station is a MAX light rail station in Portland, Oregon. It serves the Blue Line and is the 15th stop eastbound on the current Eastside MAX branch.

The station is located at the intersection of East Burnside Street and NE/SE 102nd Avenue. This station has staggered side platforms, which sit on either side of the cross street, because the route runs around this station on Burnside Street in the median. Going westbound, it is the last station to be served only by the Blue Line until the Washington/Southeast 12th Avenue station.

== Bus line connections ==
This station is served by the following bus lines:

- 15 - Belmont/NW 23rd
- 20 - Burnside/Stark
