= E 148th Ave station =

Light rail station in Oregon

E 148th Ave
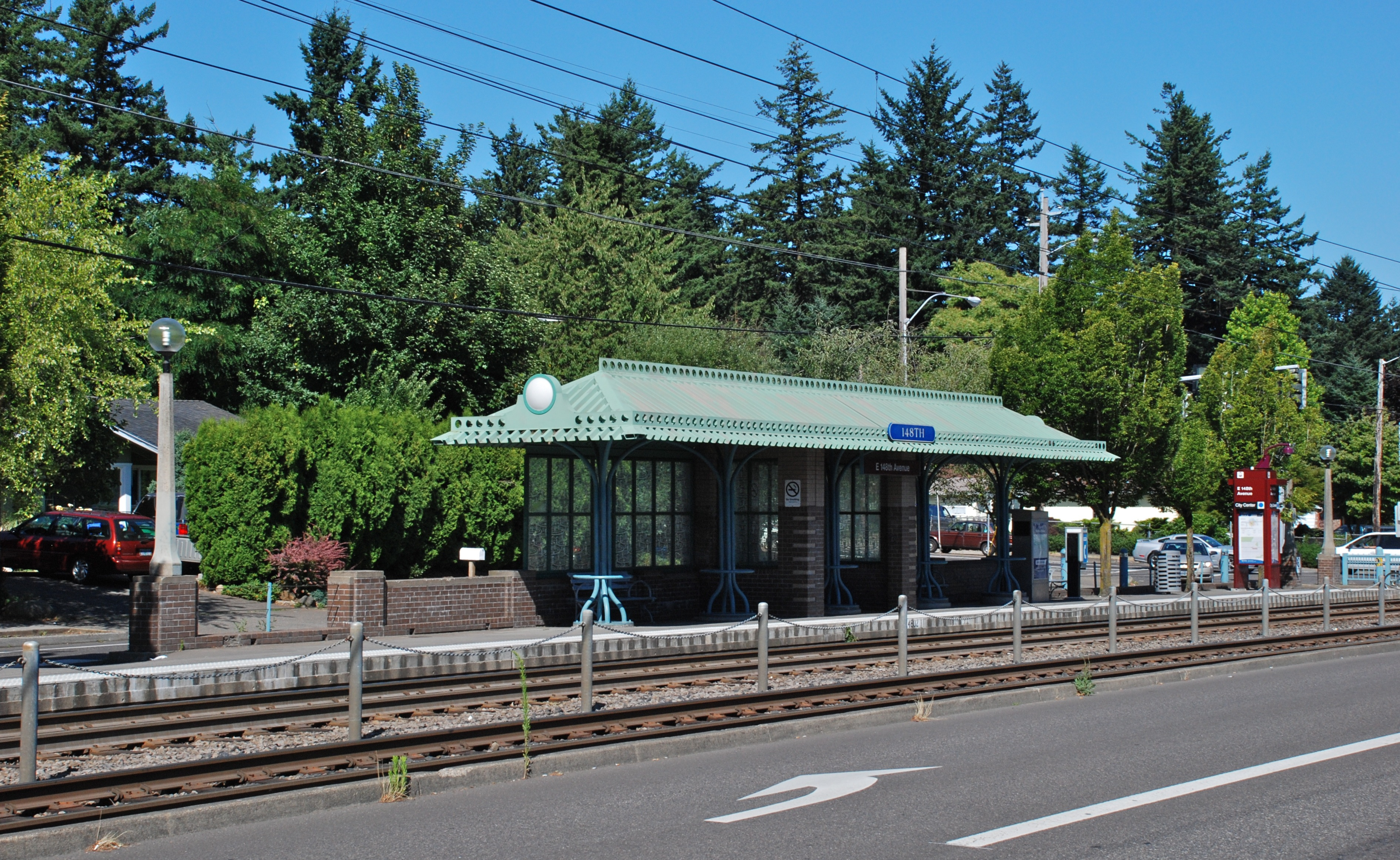
- Westbound platform

General information
- Location: E. Burnside & 148th Ave; Portland, Oregon; USA
- Coordinates: 45°31′20″N 122°30′38″W
- Owner: TriMet
- Platforms: 2 side platforms
- Tracks: 2
- Connections: TriMet: 86

Construction
- Cycle facilities: bike racks
- Accessible: yes

History
- Opened: September 5, 1986

Services
Preceding station	TriMet	Following station
East 122nd Avenue toward Hatfield Government Center	Blue Line	East 162nd Avenue toward Cleveland Ave
Location

East 148th Avenue station is a MAX light rail station in Portland, Oregon. It serves the Blue Line and is the 17th stop eastbound on the current Eastside MAX branch. It is located at the intersection of East Burnside Street and NE/SE 148th Avenue, serving the Hazelwood, Glenfair and Wilkes neighborhoods. The MAX system is owned and operated by TriMet, the major transit agency for the Portland metropolitan area.

== Bus line connections ==
Since June 2025, the station has been served by the 86 - 148th Avenue bus line, which was newly introduced at that time.
