= E 122nd Ave station =

Light rail station in Portland, Oregon, U.S.

E 122nd Ave
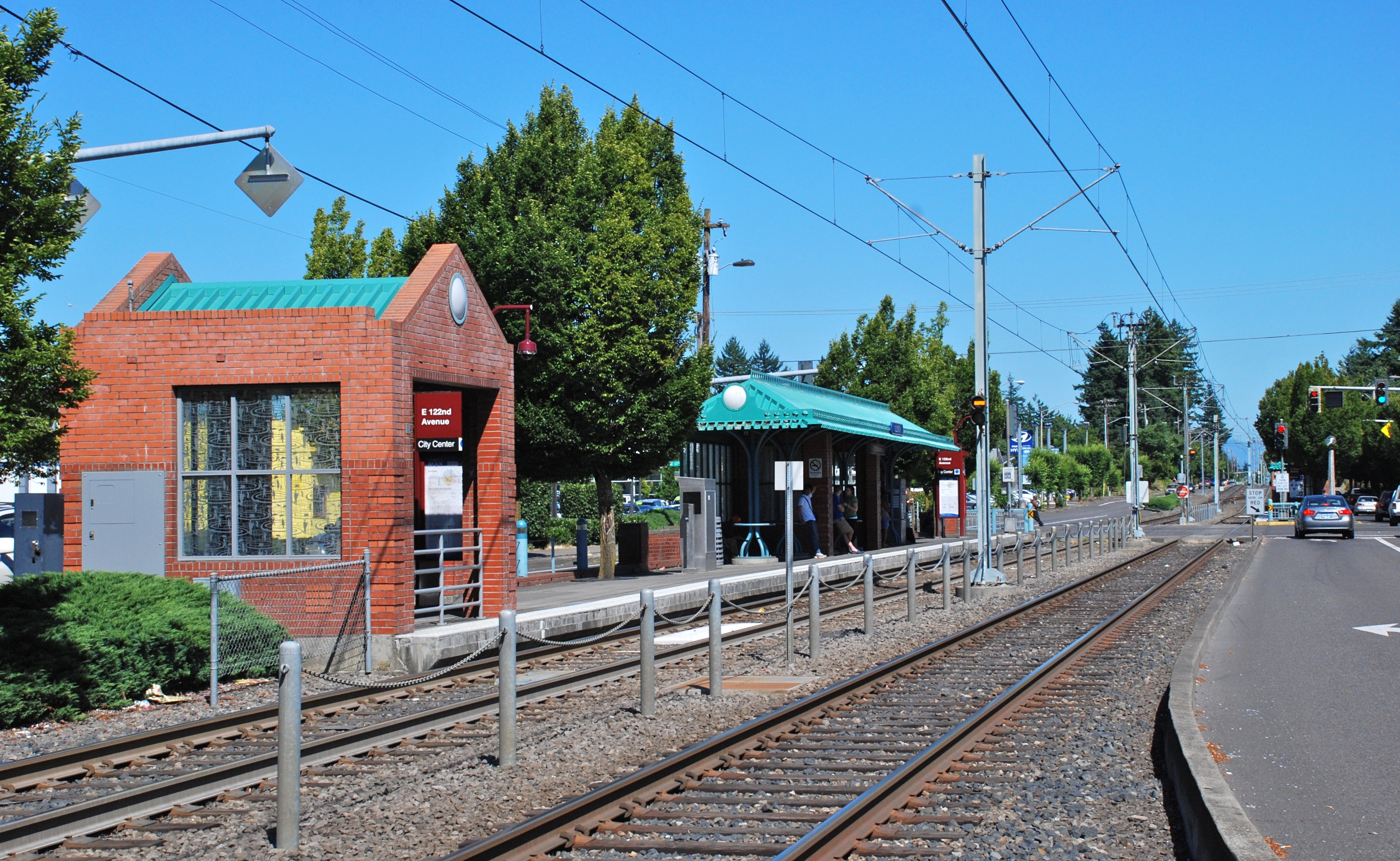

General information
- Location: East Burnside Street at 122nd Avenue; Portland, Oregon; USA
- Coordinates: 45°31′21″N 122°32′16″W
- Owner: TriMet
- Platforms: 2 side platforms
- Tracks: 2
- Connections: TriMet: 73

Construction
- Parking: 612 spaces
- Cycle facilities: bike lockers
- Accessible: yes

History
- Opened: September 5, 1986

Services
Preceding station	TriMet	Following station
East 102nd Avenue toward Hatfield Government Center	Blue Line	East 148th Avenue toward Cleveland Ave
Location

East 122nd Avenue station is a MAX light rail station in Portland, Oregon. It serves the Blue Line and is currently the 16th stop eastbound on the Eastside MAX branch. The MAX system is owned and operated by TriMet, the major transit agency for the Portland metropolitan area.

The station is located at the intersection of East Burnside Street and NE/SE 122nd Avenue in Portland's Hazelwood neighborhood. This station has staggered side platforms which are located past the cross street in each direction so that trains can pass through the intersection before stopping. The station was renovated from December 2017 to June 2018, with temporary platforms placed opposite the usual platforms.

== Bus line connections ==
This station is served by the following bus line:

- 73 - 122nd Ave
