= Rockwood/E 188th Ave station =

Light rail station in Gresham, Oregon, U.S.

Rockwood/E 188th Ave

General information
- Location: 18200 E Burnside St; Gresham, Oregon; USA
- Coordinates: 45°31′13″N 122°28′12″W
- Owner: TriMet
- Platforms: 2 side platforms
- Tracks: 2
- Connections: TriMet: 20

Construction
- Accessible: Yes

History
- Opened: September 5, 1986

Services
| Preceding station | TriMet | Following station |
|---|---|---|
| East 181st Avenue toward Hatfield Government Center | Blue Line | Ruby Junction/East 197th Avenue toward Cleveland Ave |
Location

Rockwood/East 188th Avenue is a MAX light rail station in Gresham, Oregon. It serves the Blue Line and is the 21st stop eastbound on the eastside MAX branch. The station is at the intersection of Southeast 188th Avenue and Burnside Street, within the Rockwood neighborhood. This station is a hub for bus service to Gateway Transit Center and Gresham Transit Center.

Until 2010, this station had staggered side platforms; however, the two platforms are now adjacent, both located to the west of SE 188th Avenue. A new eastbound platform was constructed, and the original westbound platform was rebuilt – with passengers using a temporary wooden platform east of 188th during the construction. The rebuilt station has more modern fixtures, improved security features, and 58-foot high artwork entitled Rockwood Sunrise. It opened in May 2011.

The station was located in TriMet fare zone 4 from its opening in 1986 until September 1988, and in zone 3 from then until September 2012, at which time TriMet discontinued all use of zones in its fare structure.

== Bus line connections ==
The following bus routes serve this station:

- 20 – Burnside/Stark
