= Washington/SE 12th Ave station =

Light rail station in Hillsboro, Oregon, U.S.

Washington/SE 12th Ave
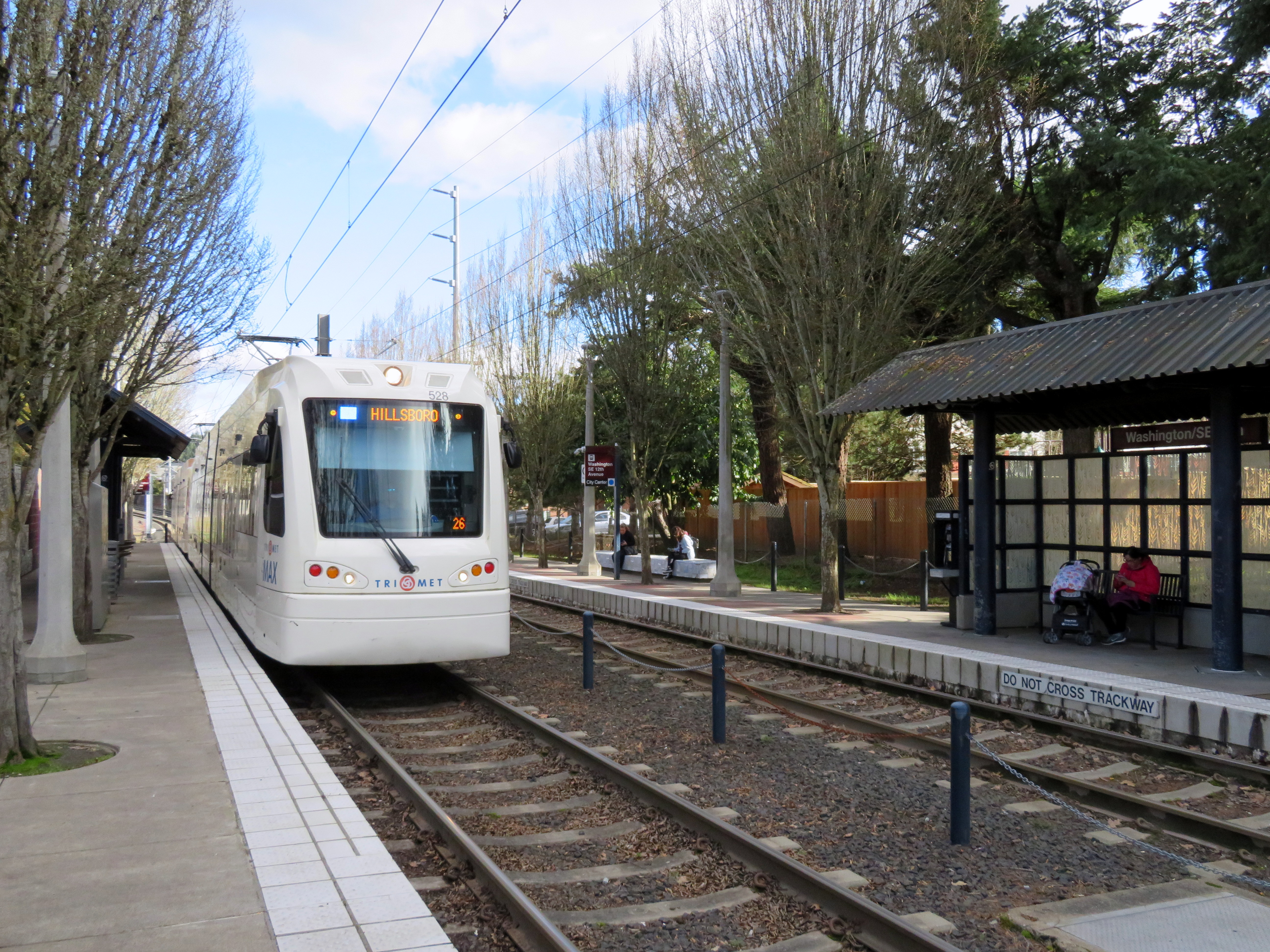
- Westbound train at the station in 2018

General information
- Location: SE Washington St at 12th Ave; Hillsboro, Oregon; USA
- Coordinates: 45°31′16″N 122°58′10″W
- Owner: Trimet
- Platforms: 2 side platforms
- Tracks: 2
- Connections: TriMet: 47

Construction
- Parking: None
- Accessible: yes

History
- Opened: September 12, 1998

Services
Preceding station	TriMet	Following station
Hillsboro Health District toward Hatfield Government Center	Blue Line	Hillsboro Airport/Fairgrounds toward Cleveland Ave
Location

Washington/Southeast 12th Avenue is a light rail station on the MAX Blue Line in Hillsboro, Oregon. Hillsboro's West Precinct is near the station. Opened in 1998, it is the 17th stop westbound on the Westside MAX, and the last eastbound stop prior to crossing the Main Street Bridge. This is the last stop westbound to be on a grade-separated right-of-way. One block west of here, trains enter the median of Washington Avenue to run through downtown Hillsboro. Traveling eastbound, this is the final station to be served only by the Blue Line until the East 102nd Avenue station.

== History ==
Construction of the Westside MAX project began in 1994, and on September 12, 1998, the station opened along with the rest of the Westside MAX line. In March 2011, TriMet received a federal grant to pay for the installation of security cameras at the station.

== Amenities ==
It is located at the eastern end of Washington Street at 12th Avenue. At this location westbound trains begin operating in the middle of Washington Street on tracks embedded in the pavement. There are bike lockers at the station, but there is not a park and ride lot. The Washington Street Station has bus connections to the 47-Main/Baseline bus line.

=== Artwork ===
The station was designed by OTAK, Inc. and has side platforms, while the artwork theme was selected by artist Linda Haworth. Located in a Hispanic neighborhood, the public art theme is "Sweet Home and the Garden of Life" or "La Casa Dulce y el Jardin de la Vida." The dominant piece of art is a 140-foot-long (43 m) tile wall created from over 650 tiles created by area residents. Other artwork includes photographs etched into the glass of the windscreen, birds in a mosaic on benches, and a weather vane that looks like a snow globe as designed by Nate Slusarenko with images of Mount Hood and vehicles. There is also a path colored to resemble carpet, while the planters at the station resemble kettles used for making cheese in the traditional manner.
