= E 181st Ave station =

Light rail station in Gresham, Oregon, U.S.

E 181st Ave
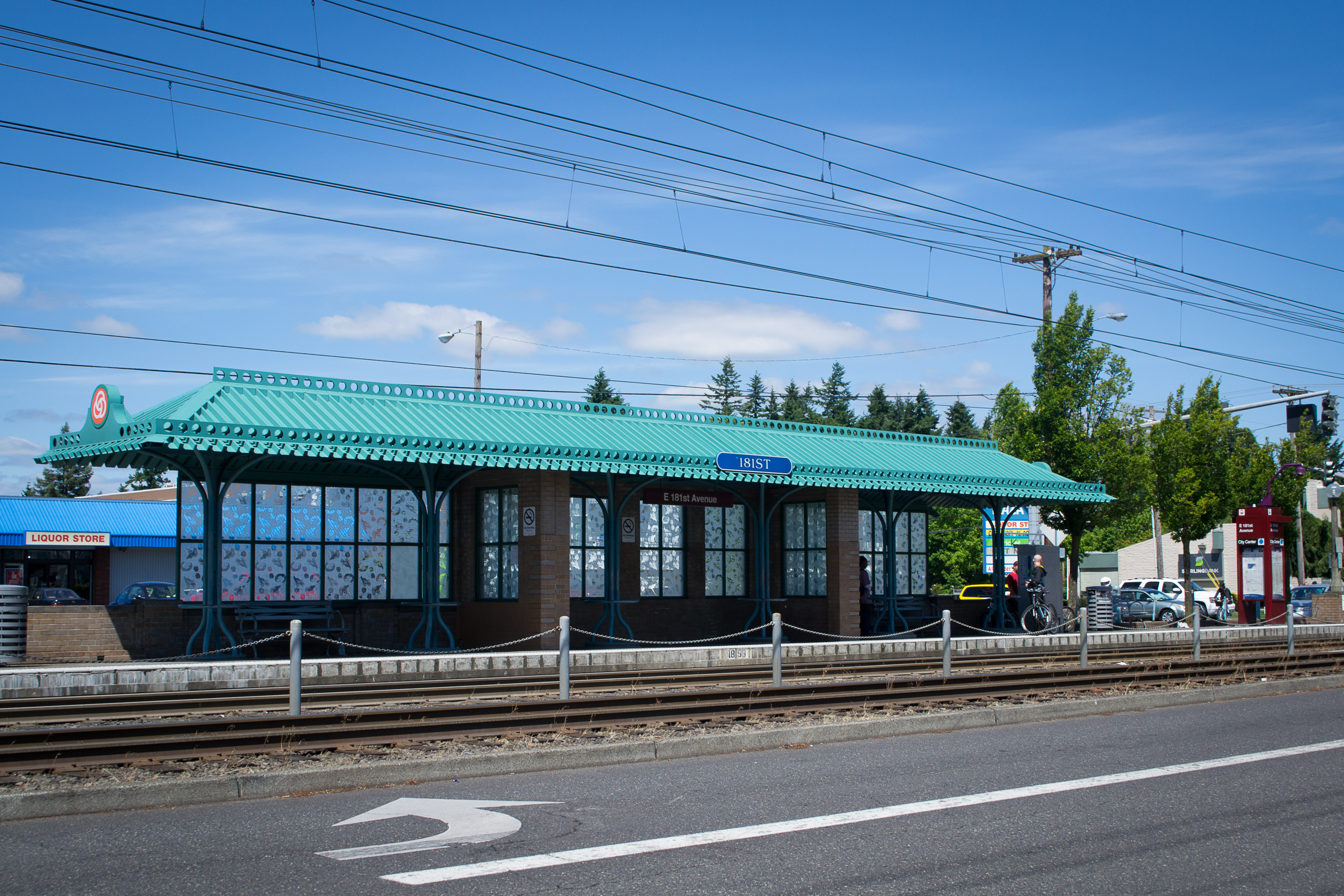
- Westbound platform

General information
- Location: E Burnside St & 181st Ave; Gresham, Oregon; USA
- Coordinates: 45°31′19″N 122°28′38″W
- Owner: TriMet
- Platforms: 2 side platforms
- Tracks: 2
- Connections: TriMet: 25, 87

Construction
- Parking: 247 spaces
- Cycle facilities: bike racks and lockers
- Accessible: yes

History
- Opened: September 5, 1986

Services
Preceding station	TriMet	Following station
East 172nd Avenue toward Hatfield Government Center	Blue Line	Rockwood/East 188th Ave toward Cleveland Ave
Location

East 181st Avenue station is a MAX light rail station in Gresham, Oregon. It serves the Blue Line and is the 20th stop eastbound on the eastside MAX line.

The station is at the intersection of NE/SE 181st Avenue and Burnside Street. This station has staggered side platforms, which sit on either side of the cross street, because the route runs around this station on Burnside Street in the median. Sterling Bank is by the eastbound platform on Burnside and 181st.

A TriMet park-and-ride lot for this station is available just to the east, at 18324 E. Burnside Street.

The station was located in TriMet fare zone 3 from its opening in 1986 until September 2012, at which time TriMet discontinued all use of zones in its fare structure.

== Bus line connections ==
This station is served by the following bus lines:

- 25-Glisan/Troutdale Rd
- 87-Airport Way/181st Ave

In addition, line 20-Burnside/Stark serves stops at 181st and Stark, about four blocks (or 1,000 feet) to the south of the MAX station.
