= E 162nd Ave station =

Light rail station in Portland, Oregon, U.S.

E 162nd Ave
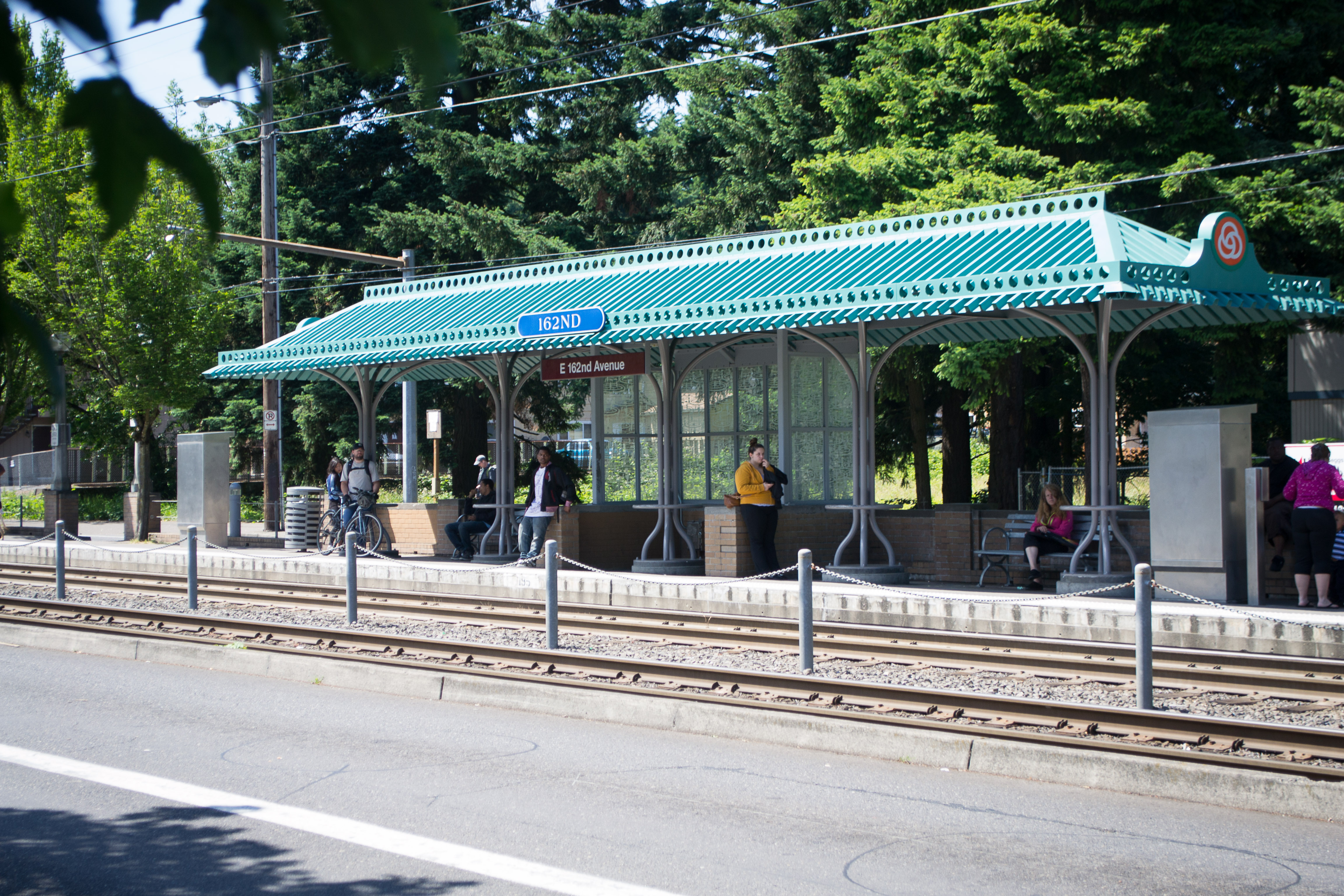

General information
- Location: E Burnside & 162nd Avenue; Portland/Gresham, Oregon; USA
- Coordinates: 45°31′20″N 122°29′47″W
- Owner: TriMet
- Platforms: 2 side platforms
- Tracks: 2
- Connections: TriMet: 74

Construction
- Cycle facilities: bike racks
- Accessible: yes

History
- Opened: September 5, 1986

Services
Preceding station	TriMet	Following station
East 148th Avenue toward Hatfield Government Center	Blue Line	East 172nd Avenue toward Cleveland Ave
Location

East 162nd Avenue station is a MAX light rail station on the boundary between Portland and Gresham in Oregon, USA. It serves the Blue Line and is the 18th stop eastbound on the current Eastside MAX branch.

The station is at the intersection of East Burnside Street and NE/SE 162nd Avenue. It has staggered side platforms, which sit on either side of the cross street. Trains operate in the median of Burnside Street and the two platforms are located immediately after a train crosses 162nd Avenue, in both directions.

== Bus line connections ==
Since March 2018, the station has been served by the 74 bus line to 74 - 162nd Ave, which was newly introduced at that time.
