= Ruby Junction/E 197th Ave station =

Light rail station in Gresham, Oregon, US

Ruby Junction/E 197th Ave
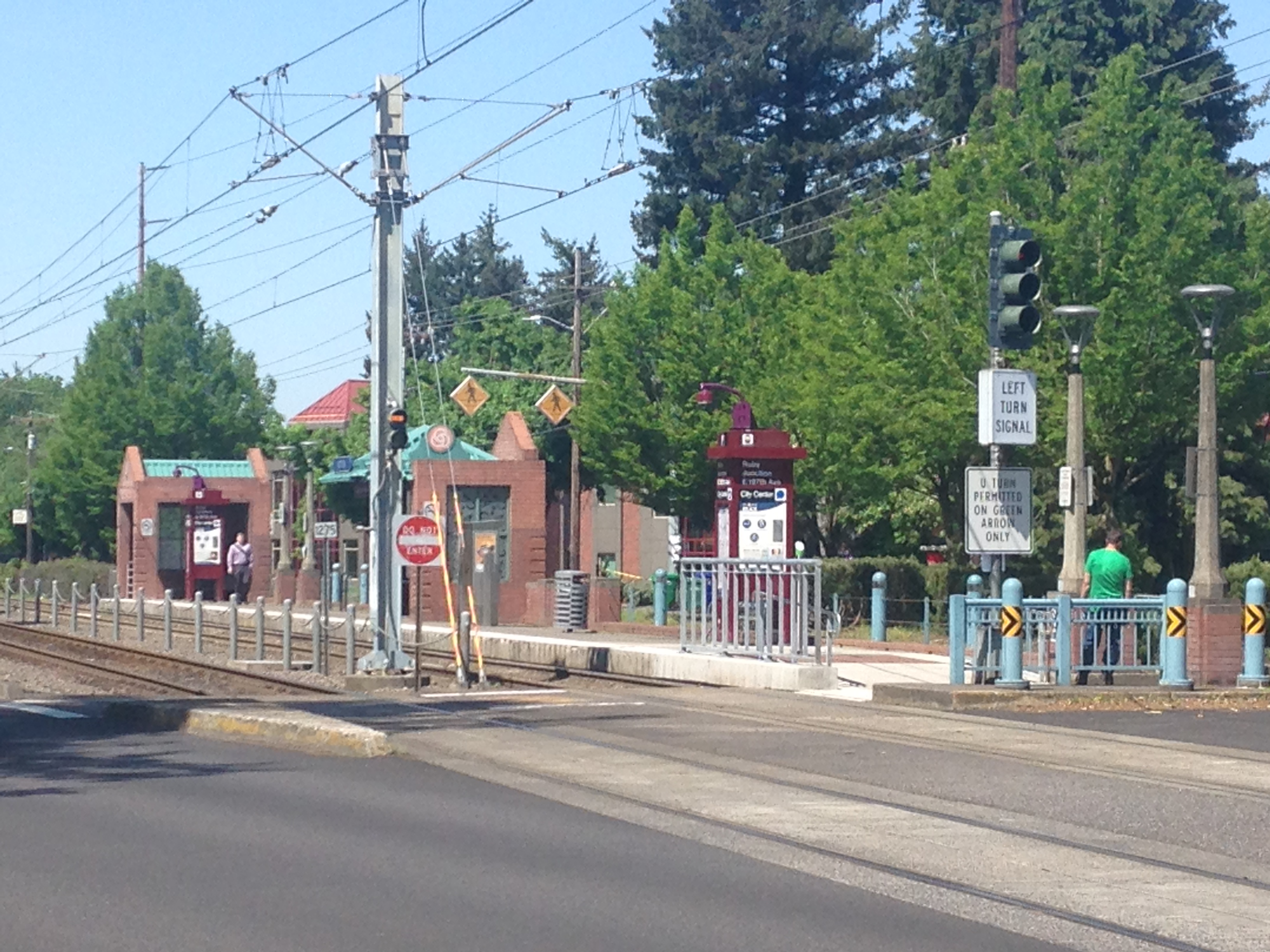

General information
- Location: SE Burnside St & 197th Ave; Gresham, Oregon; USA
- Coordinates: 45°30′58″N 122°27′37″W
- Owner: TriMet
- Platforms: 2 side platforms
- Tracks: 2

Construction
- Cycle facilities: bike racks
- Accessible: yes

History
- Opened: September 5, 1986

Services
Preceding station	TriMet	Following station
Rockwood/East 188th Ave toward Hatfield Government Center	Blue Line	Civic Drive toward Cleveland Ave
Location

Ruby Junction/East 197th Avenue is a MAX light rail station in Gresham, Oregon. It serves the Blue Line and is the 22nd stop eastbound on the eastside MAX line. The station is at the intersection of SE 197th Avenue and Burnside Street.

The station's namesake, Ruby Junction, was a junction of electric interurban lines located immediately east of this location for many years and the name of an interurban stop. With the abandonment of the interurban lines west along Burnside Street to Montavilla and north to Troutdale, in 1927, it ceased being a junction, but interurban cars running between Portland and Bull Run (later cut back to Gresham) continued to pass through the area until the 1940s, and the location was still referred to as Ruby Junction.

The station serves the Ruby Junction Maintenance and Operations Facility—often the point where MAX operators switch shifts or trains returning to the yards terminate, according to their rollsigns. Construction of that facility, which was also the first construction on TriMet's MAX system, began in March 1982, and the facility opened in mid-1983. It has been expanded several times since then.

The station was located in TriMet fare zone 4 from its opening in 1986 until September 1988, and in zone 3 from then until September 2012, at which time TriMet discontinued all use of zones in its fare structure.
