= E 172nd Ave station =

MAX light rail station in Gresham, Oregon, USA

E 172nd Ave
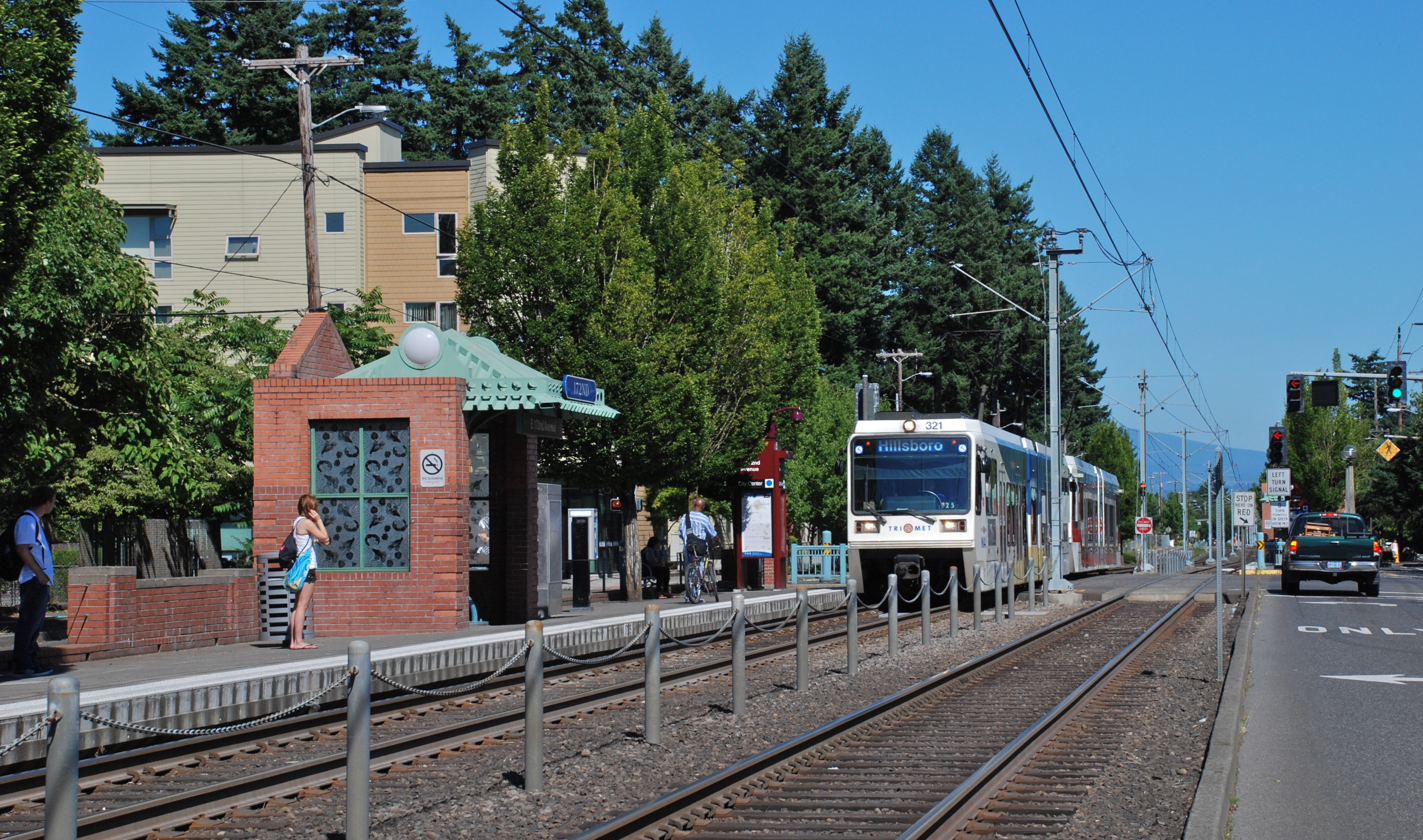
- The station's westbound platform

General information
- Location: E. Burnside & 172nd Avenue; Gresham, Oregon; USA
- Coordinates: 45°31′20″N 122°29′10″W
- Owner: TriMet
- Platforms: 2 side platforms
- Tracks: 2

Construction
- Cycle facilities: bike racks
- Accessible: yes

History
- Opened: September 5, 1986

Services
Preceding station	TriMet	Following station
East 162nd Avenue toward Hatfield Government Center	Blue Line	East 181st Avenue toward Cleveland Ave
Location

East 172nd Avenue station is a MAX light rail station in Gresham, Oregon. It serves the Blue Line and is the 19th stop eastbound on the eastside MAX line. The MAX system is owned and operated by TriMet, the major transit agency for the Portland metropolitan area.

The station is at the intersection of East Burnside Street and NE/SE 172nd Avenue. This station has staggered side platforms, which sit on either side of the cross street, because the route runs around this station on Burnside Street in the median.

The station was located in TriMet fare zone 3 from its opening in 1986 until September 2012, at which time TriMet discontinued all use of zones in its fare structure.
