= MAX Blue Line =

Light rail line in Portland, Oregon

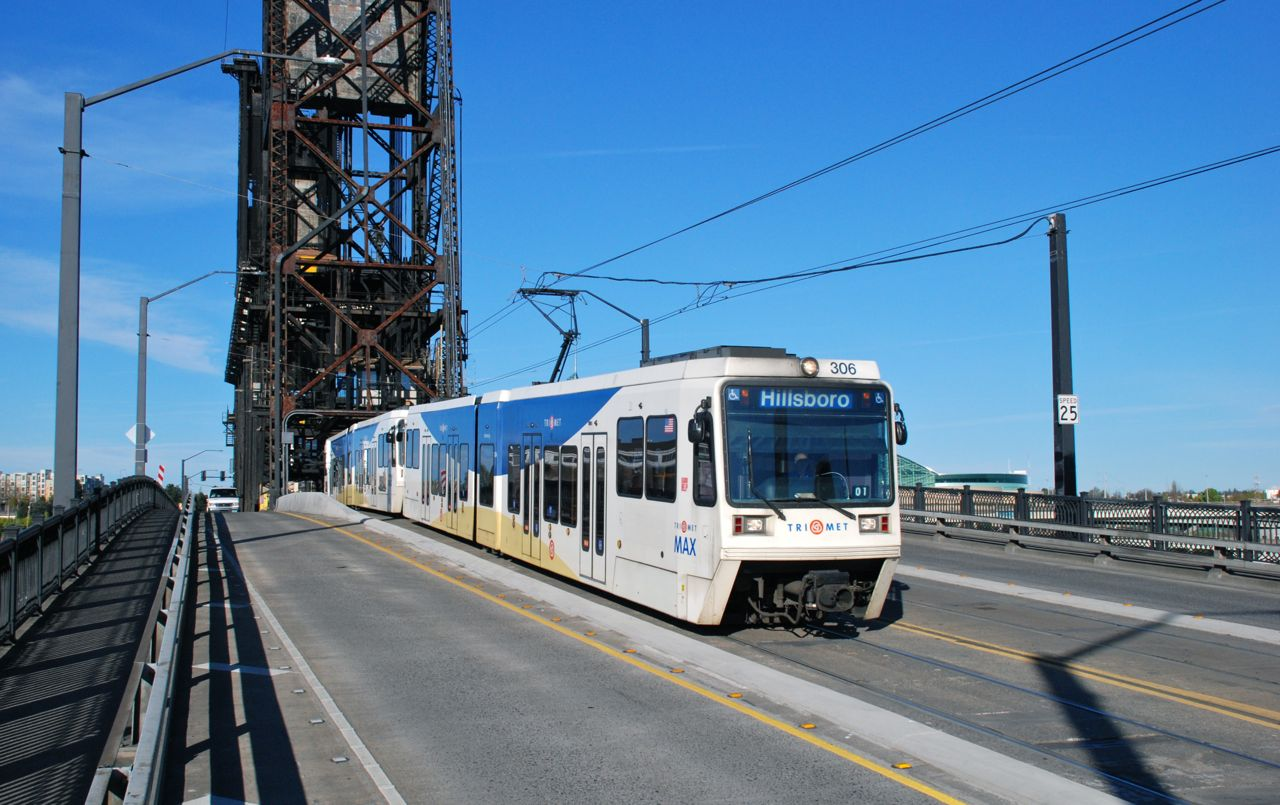
- A Blue Line train crossing the Steel Bridge in Portland

Overview
- Other name(s): Eastside segment: Banfield Light Rail Project; Eastside MAX; Westside segment: Westside MAX
- Owner: TriMet
- Locale: Portland, Oregon, U.S.
- Termini: Hatfield Government Center in Hillsboro (west); Cleveland Avenue in Gresham (east)
- Stations: 47
- Website: MAX Blue Line

Service
- Type: Light rail
- System: MAX Light Rail
- Operator: TriMet
- Daily ridership: 25,250 (2025, weekdays)

History
- Opened: September 5, 1986; 40 years ago

Technical
- Line length: 33 mi (53 km) (Note: Although several sources provide more precise figures, TriMet itself almost always gives only rounded figures for the lengths of the distinct segments of the Blue Line, of 15 miles (24 km) (Banfield/Eastside MAX), 12 miles (19 km) (Westside MAX), 6 miles (9.7 km) (Westside MAX Hillsboro Extension), and a total of 33 miles (53 km), with no tenths digit. At least one TriMet-issued news release referred to the Blue Line's length as "nearly 33 miles".)
- Num of tracks: 2
- Character: At-grade, elevated, and underground
- Track gauge: 4 ft 8 1/2 in (1,435 mm) standard gauge
- Electrification: Overhead line, 750 V DC
- Maximum incline: 7.0%

The MAX Blue Line is a light rail line serving the Portland metropolitan area in the U.S. state of Oregon. Operated by TriMet as part of MAX Light Rail, it connects Hillsboro, Beaverton, Portland, and Gresham. The line serves 47 stations; it travels 33 miles (53 km) from Hatfield Government Center station in Hillsboro to Cleveland Ave station in Gresham. Service runs for 22 1/2 hours per day from Monday to Thursday, with headways of between 30 minutes off-peak and five minutes during rush hour. It runs later in the evening on Fridays and Saturdays and ends earlier on Sundays. The Blue Line is the busiest of the five MAX lines, having carried an average 25,019 riders each day on weekdays in May 2025.

The success of local freeway revolts in Portland in the early 1970s led to a reallocation of federal assistance funds from the proposed Mount Hood Freeway and Interstate 505 (I-505) projects to mass transit. Among various proposals, local governments approved the construction of a light rail line between Gresham and Portland in 1978. Referred to as the Banfield Light Rail Project during planning and construction as a part of the Banfield Freeway redevelopment, construction of what is now the Eastside MAX segment began in 1983. The line was inaugurated as the Metropolitan Area Express (MAX) on September 5, 1986.

Planning for an extension of MAX to the west side began as early as 1979. Known as the Westside MAX, construction was delayed by nearly a decade due to funding disagreements. Originally designed to terminate at 185th Avenue near the border of Hillsboro and Beaverton, proponents for a longer line achieved a supplemental extension to downtown Hillsboro just before groundbreaking in 1993. The Westside MAX opened in two phases following delays in tunnel construction; the first section up to Goose Hollow opened in 1997 while the rest opened on September 12, 1998.

In 2000, the two distinct segments, already operating as a single through route between Gresham and Hillsboro, were unified in passenger information as the Blue Line after TriMet introduced a color coding scheme in preparation for the opening of the Red Line to Portland International Airport. The Blue Line currently shares its route with the Red Line between Hillsboro Airport/Fairgrounds station and Gateway/Northeast 99th Avenue Transit Center.

== Eastside history ==
=== Early freeway opposition ===
Following recommendations by Robert Moses, the Oregon State Highway Department developed a 1955 plan for freeways in the Portland metropolitan area that included, among others, the Stadium, Mount Hood, and Industrial freeways. Added to the Interstate Highway System as Interstate 405 (I-405), the Stadium Freeway was the first to begin construction, in 1963. Its route through downtown Portland resulted in property condemnations that sparked one of the region’s earliest freeway opposition movements, which intensified as planning advanced for the other projects.

In 1971, the Portland–Vancouver Metropolitan Transportation Study (PVMTS) (Note: The Portland–Vancouver Metropolitan Transportation Study, also referred to as the "Portland–Vancouver Metropolitan Area Transportation Study", or PVMATS, by some publications, was an agency charged with highway planning.) published a 1990 Transportation Plan. Later adopted by the Columbia Region Association of Governments (CRAG) as the regional transportation plan, it called for 54 new road and highway projects. That same year, an anti-freeway group, Sensible Transportation Options for People (STOP), was formed. Meanwhile, Neil Goldschmidt ran a successful campaign opposing freeway expansion, winning election to the Portland City Council.

By 1972, local groups had filed lawsuits against the Oregon Transportation Commission to halt the Mount Hood and Industrial—by then called I-505—freeways. For I-505, a U.S. district court forced the Highway Department to conduct an appropriate environmental impact statement (EIS) after Northwest Portland residents alleged that National Environmental Policy Act guidelines were ignored. In 1973, a separate EIS prepared by Skidmore, Owings & Merrill determined that if built, the Mount Hood Freeway would only add more traffic to downtown Portland than the surface streets could handle. Then, on February 4, 1974, U.S. District Judge James M. Burns rejected the freeway plan after finding that the corridor selection process failed to follow the appropriate procedures. Multnomah County and the City of Portland withdrew their support for the Mount Hood Freeway later that year, and in 1978, the City of Portland did the same for I-505.

=== Transitway planning and construction ===
With highway revolts similarly occurring in cities across the country, the U.S. Congress passed the Federal-Aid Highway Act of 1973 containing a provision that allowed state governments for the first time to transfer federal funds from withdrawn interstate projects to other transportation options, including mass transit. The Mount Hood Freeway and I-505 were officially removed from the Interstate Highway System in 1976 and 1979, respectively, but planning for the use of around $200 million from the Mount Hood Freeway and $154 million from I-505 on other projects in the Portland area started much earlier. In May 1973, Governor Tom McCall assembled a task force to determine alternative uses for the highway funds. The task force, in turn, recommended a network of "transitways". The task force was subsumed into CRAG in 1974, and CRAG incorporated its recommendations in an "Interim Transportation Plan" (ITP) adopted in June 1975. The ITP identified three corridors for potential funding using the highway funds: Banfield, Oregon City/Johnson Creek, and Sunset (Westside). In 1976, CRAG moved forward with a detailed study of the Banfield Corridor and put planning for the other corridors on hold. Among five alternatives developed by the Highway Division, including the removal or extension of an existing high-occupancy vehicle lane, a busway had been favored for the Banfield Corridor. Support for light rail on the corridor grew following the mode's inclusion as a sixth alternative in a 1977 EIS, though there was also opposition. Notable opposition came from the East County Concerned Citizens; 5,400 individuals signed a petition against any alternative involving light rail for costs and lack of presumed ridership. The group endorsed a plan to add an HOV lane and general lanes to Banfield instead. This opposition was notable, especially in comparison to the 340 individual comments received during a discussion period in 1977–1978.

In September 1978, TriMet became the first jurisdiction to adopt a resolution supporting a combined light rail and highway expansion plan. Remaining local jurisdictions each announced their support by November, and the State Transportation Commission approved the project in 1979. The Banfield light rail project received federal approval for construction in September 1980. Plans for a 27-station, 15.1-mile (24.3 km) line, running from Southwest 11th Avenue in downtown Portland to just east of Cleveland Avenue in Gresham, were produced by Wilbur Smith Associates. The project estimated a budget of $225.5 million (equivalent to $675 million in 2025 dollars), of which $146.9 million went to light rail. Planners selected the Steel Bridge to carry the alignment over the Willamette River because it had been designed for the use of the city's former streetcars. In the east side, planners routed the line through a former Mount Hood Company interurban right-of-way, which occupied the median of East Burnside Street between 99th Avenue in Portland and Ruby Junction/197th Avenue, along which interurban service had ended in 1927. From Ruby Junction to Cleveland Avenue, planners assumed acquisition of a two-mile (3.2 km) section owned by the Portland Traction Company (PTC). In August 1983, PTC agreed to surrender this segment as part of a longer abandonment up to Linnemann Junction, a total of 4.3 miles (6.9 km) of right-of-way, which TriMet bought for $2.9 million in December of that year. Anticipating 42,500 riders by 1990, TriMet purchased 26 light rail vehicles from Bombardier, with each car costing $750,000. Bombardier started their production in 1982 and began delivering them in 1984. Zimmer Gunsul Frasca designed the line's stations and overpasses, earning the firm a Progressive Architecture Award in 1984.

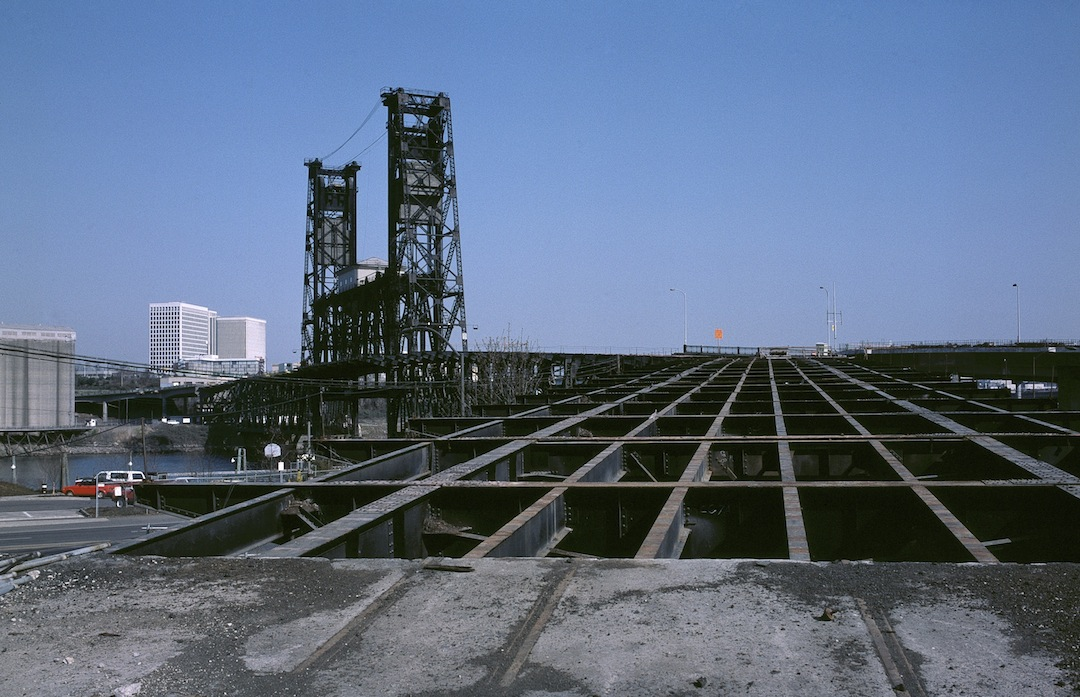
Redecking work on the Glisan Street ramp of the Steel Bridge in 1985

The groundbreaking ceremony took place at Ruby Junction Yard, which would house a 98,000-square-foot (9,100 m^{2}) maintenance and operations building, in March 1982. Light rail construction, which progressed largely east to west, commenced the following year in April, on the two-mile (3.2 km) section between Ruby Junction and Cleveland Avenue. The Ruby Junction facility opened as the system's first maintenance complex later that July. By January 1984, work had reached East Burnside Street. To minimize the cost of the Banfield Freeway segment, track right-of-way excavation and freeway widening took place simultaneously. Construction along this segment nonetheless slowed due to late material deliveries, particularly between Northeast Union and 39th avenues. Track work in downtown Portland, the final section to be built, began in March 1984 and involved utility relocation, cobblestone paving, and tree planting across 36 downtown blocks. The line's use of the Steel Bridge necessitated a $10 million rehabilitation that started the following June. System testing followed the completion of electrification work. This included the validation of the new light rail cars, which initially encountered electrical braking glitches, by putting each of them through 1,500 miles (2,400 km) of on-track testing. On July 28, 1986, an eastbound car conducting a test run struck and killed a man who had trespassed onto the light rail tracks near Northeast 68th Avenue. The Steel Bridge reopened in May 1986 after encountering a nine-month delay caused by structural problems and late deliveries. The bridge's owners—the Union Pacific and Southern Pacific railroads—added to the delay by insisting on the replacement of the bridge's 64 lift cables, which TriMet claimed had not been in the original contract.

=== Inauguration and later improvements ===
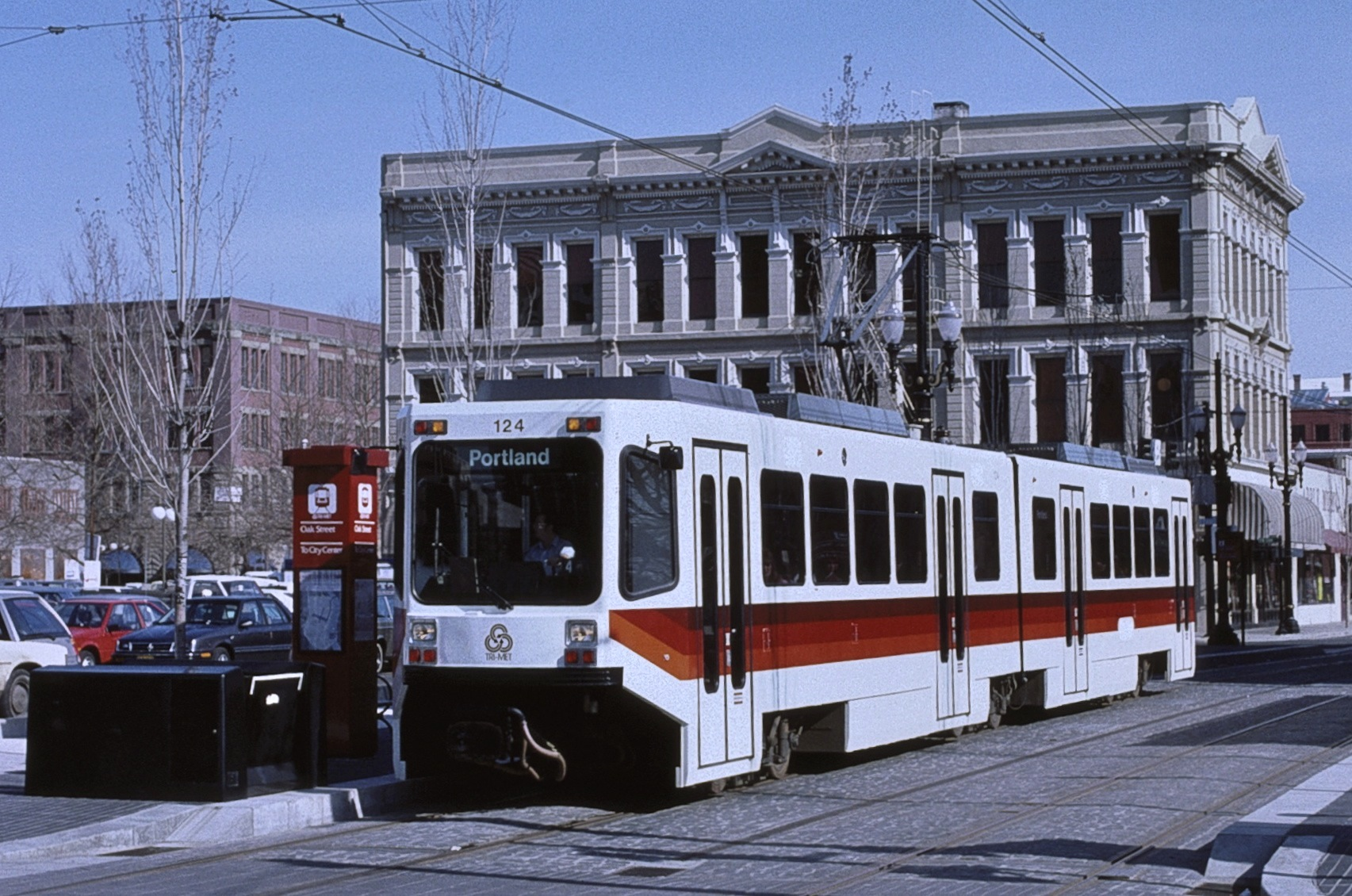
A MAX car stopped at Oak Street station in 1987

On September 5, 1986, the $214 million (equivalent to $532 million in 2025 dollars) light rail line—now called Metropolitan Area Express (MAX)—opened for service. Its new name was selected through a public contest held by The Oregonian and TriMet in June 1986. TriMet designer Jeff Frane, who attributed inspiration to his son Alex, made the winning suggestion. As the planning of an extension to the west side progressed, this line came to be referred to as the Eastside MAX. Freeway transfer funds provided $178.3 million, or 83 percent of the total cost. The project was completed $10 million under budget. An estimated 250,000 people attended the opening celebrations which spanned three days. Downtown retailers, many of whom had opposed light rail, reported substantial increases in sales following the line's opening. Nine new bus lines were created and six existing bus routes were modified as feeder routes. MAX trains initially operated between 5:00 am and 1:30 am, with headways as short as seven minutes. Fares ranged $0.85–$1.30 to travel up to four paid zones. Rides were free within Fareless Square from opening day until 2012.

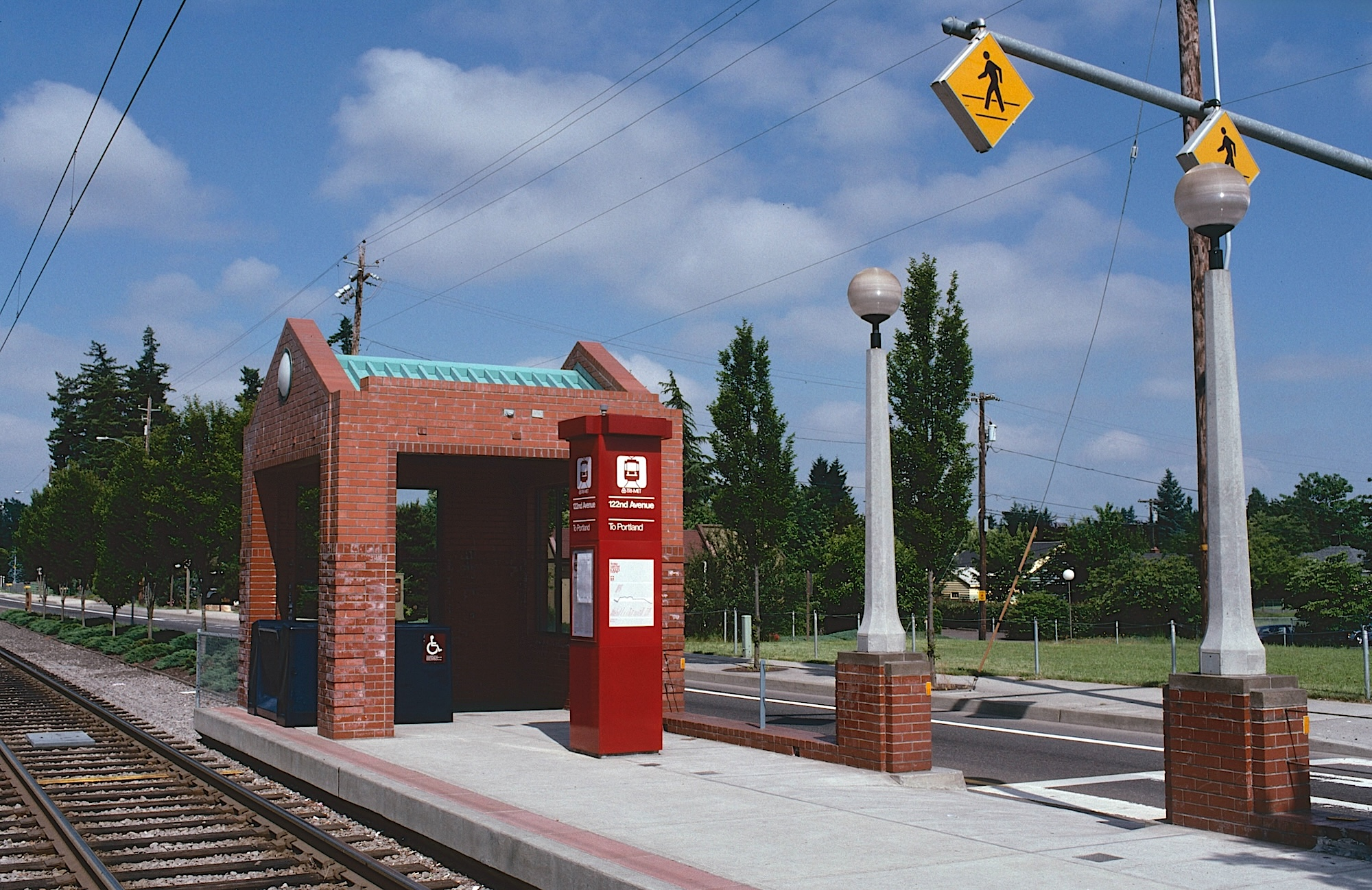
For the first 11 years, accessibility was provided by wheelchair lifts on the platforms, most housed within open-sided brick shelters.

Originally, MAX trains did not automatically stop at every station, if no one was waiting to board when a train approached a given stop. MAX cars were equipped with stop-request bell cords (as are commonly found on American transit buses), which passengers needed to pull to signal the operator that they wanted to get off at the next stop. However, after finding that the times when a train could pass a station without needing to stop – because no one was getting on or off – were mainly limited to late-night hours and a small number of less-used stations, TriMet removed the bell cords in November 1994 and changed its operating practices to have trains stop at every station at all times.

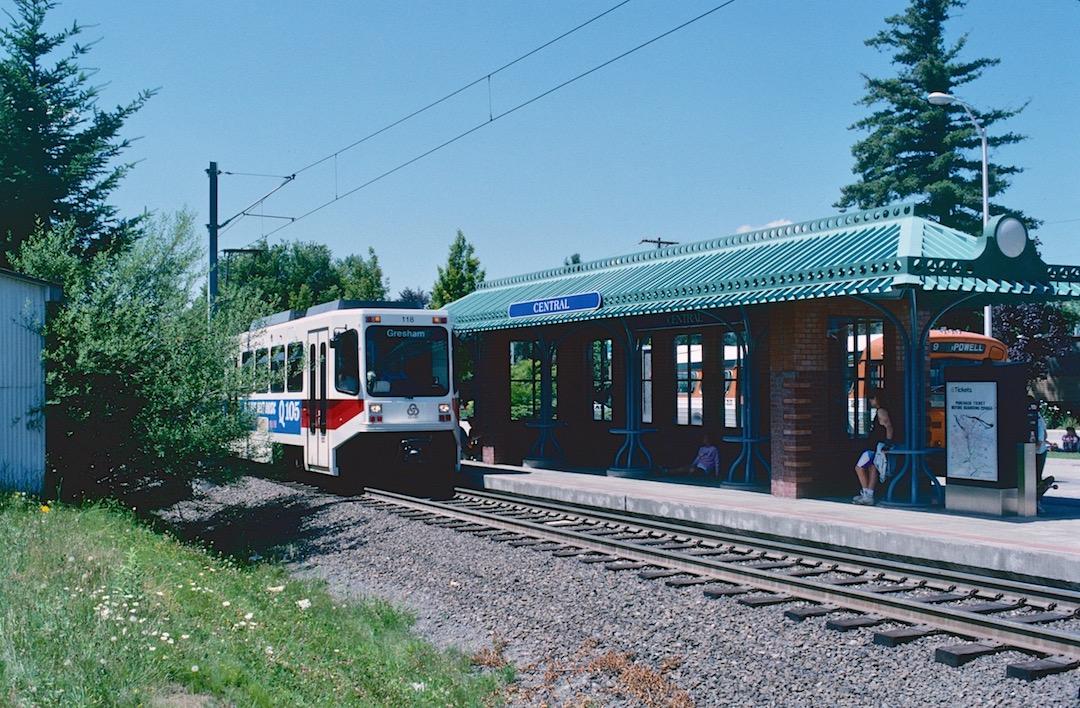
Gresham Central station in 1989, when the line section on which it is located was still single-track

From 1986 to 1996, most of the line's easternmost two miles (3.2 km), beyond the Ruby Junction maintenance facility, operated as bidirectional single-track. Trains traveling in opposite directions were unable to pass in these sections, resulting in delays when service ran behind schedule. In early 1996, a second track was laid and a second platform was constructed at Gresham Central Transit Center, making the section double-track and eliminating the only remaining single-track on the Eastside MAX. The new track was brought into use in May after a three-month suspension of MAX service east of Rockwood/East 188th Avenue station; it had been replaced by shuttle buses to allow the work to be carried out.

Since the inauguration of MAX, TriMet has added four infill stations to the original alignment. In March 1990, the system opened the Mall stations—their names referring to the Portland Transit Mall—to coincide with the opening of Pioneer Place shopping mall in downtown Portland. After operating for 30 years, these stations closed permanently in March 2020, owing to low ridership and to speed up train travel times across the city center. In September 1990, the Oregon Convention Center opened to the public with MAX service from Convention Center station. Work on the line's newest station, Civic Drive, started in 1997 as part of the Civic neighborhood development, but was delayed for approximately twelve years due to a lack of funding. Construction resumed in May 2010 and the station opened on December 1, 2010.

In 2015, TriMet began renovating fourteen of the system's oldest stations, between Hollywood/Northeast 42nd Avenue Transit Center and Cleveland Avenue. The project includes the installation of new windscreens, shelter roofs, digital information displays, lighting, and security cameras. Three stations—Gresham City Hall, East 122nd Avenue, and East 162nd Avenue—have been renovated as of February 2019.

== Westside extension ==
=== Early planning and delays ===
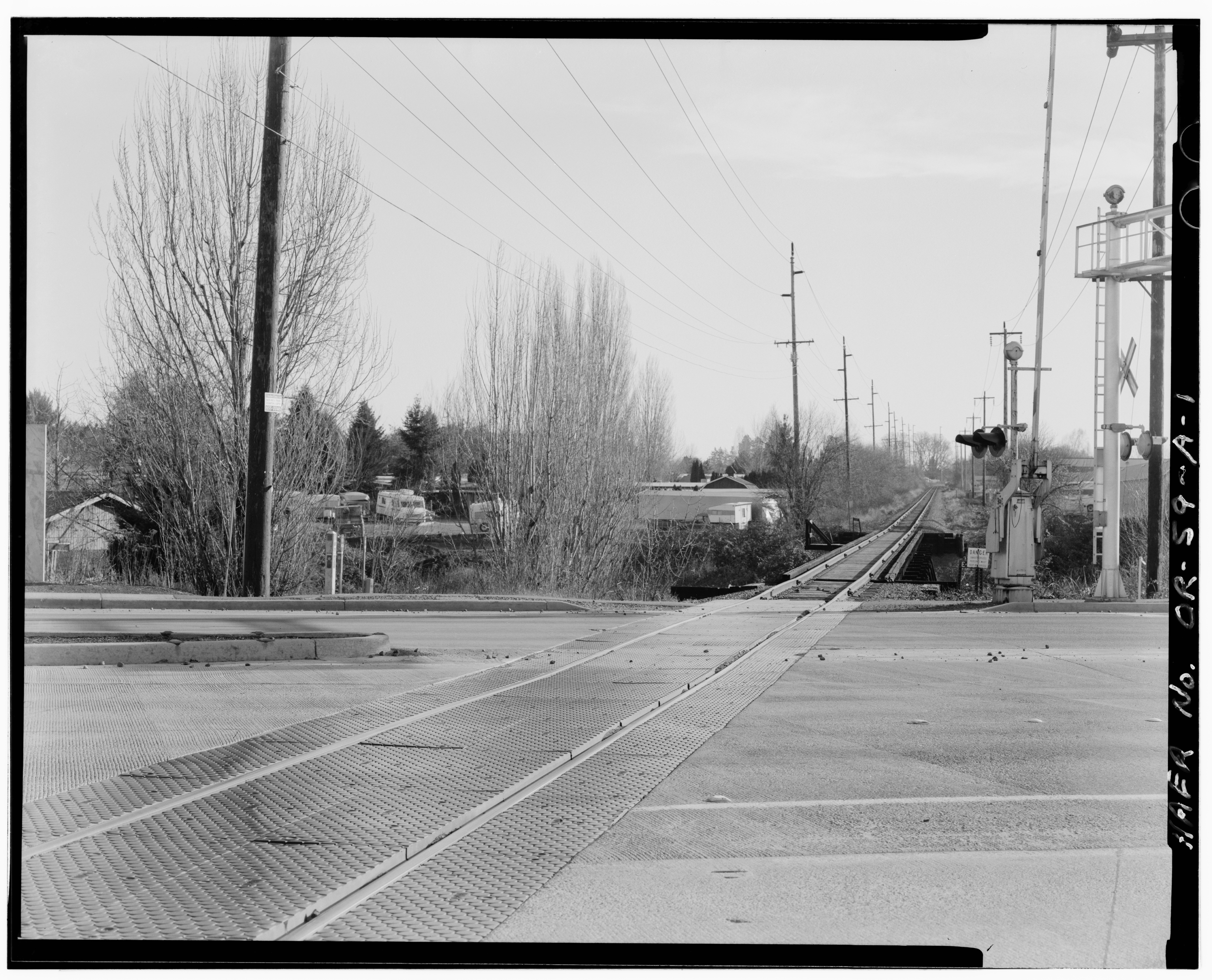
The former-OE railway crossing on 185th Avenue in 1995, prior to the start of construction

On September 30, 1908, an interurban rail service ran for the first time between Portland and Hillsboro. It was operated by the Oregon Electric Railway (OE), which built a branch line from its Garden Home depot to Forest Grove. The Great Depression and the rise of the automobile in the 1920s led to the closure of the Forest Grove Branch in 1932. The Burlington Northern Railroad (BN) later acquired much of this alignment and used it for freight service. It abandoned a segment between Orenco and central Hillsboro in 1977.

In 1979, plans to restore passenger rail service from Portland to the west side emerged with a proposal to extend MAX to 185th Avenue, near the Hillsboro–Beaverton boundary. In 1983, Metro (the successor to CRAG) selected light rail as the preferred mode alternative, and the Urban Mass Transportation Administration (UMTA) released $1.3 million to begin a preliminary engineering study. That same year, newly appointed Hillsboro Mayor Shirley Huffman began lobbying for the line's extension to downtown Hillsboro. She traveled frequently to Washington, D.C. to lobby Congress and UMTA. The project was later suspended by TriMet amid conflict with UMTA, who wanted the former to develop a financing plan before it released funding for preliminary engineering work. By the time planning resumed in January 1988, significant changes in the Westside Corridor, including the conversion of 3,000 acres (1,214 ha) of vacant Washington County land into mixed-use urban areas, required a re-evaluation that was completed in May 1991.

As planning continued on the route between Portland and 185th Avenue, alternative routes through Beaverton included alignments along the Sunset Highway (U.S. 26), the BN right-of-way, and the Tualatin Valley Highway (TV Highway). A consultant recommended the BN alternative to TriMet in December 1988, and the agency's board ultimately selected that recommendation. The terminus station would have been along the BN right-of-way near 185th Avenue and Baseline Road. Meanwhile, the Portland City Council formed an advisory committee to determine whether the route through downtown should extend west from 11th Avenue on Southwest Morrison and Yamhill streets or run through the Portland Transit Mall on 5th and 6th avenues. The locally preferred alternative ultimately adopted a continuation of MAX along Morrison and Yamhill streets.

The efforts of Huffman and others regarding the proposed Hillsboro extension led to a supplemental study in April 1993, which evaluated options to extend the westside light rail project, among other mode alternatives, to the Westside Commons or downtown Hillsboro. Alternative routes up to downtown Hillsboro included the abandoned BN segment from 185th Avenue to 10th Avenue, Baseline and Cornell roads, and TV Highway. In July of that year, TriMet approved an extension of the initial 11.5-mile (19 km) light rail line, 6.2 miles (10 km) farther west to downtown Hillsboro using the abandoned BN route. This brought the project's new total distance to 17.7 miles (28.5 km) (some sources say 17.5 km). At the time, the line was scheduled to open as far as 185th Avenue in September 1997, and downtown Hillsboro by the end of 1998.

=== Funding and construction ===
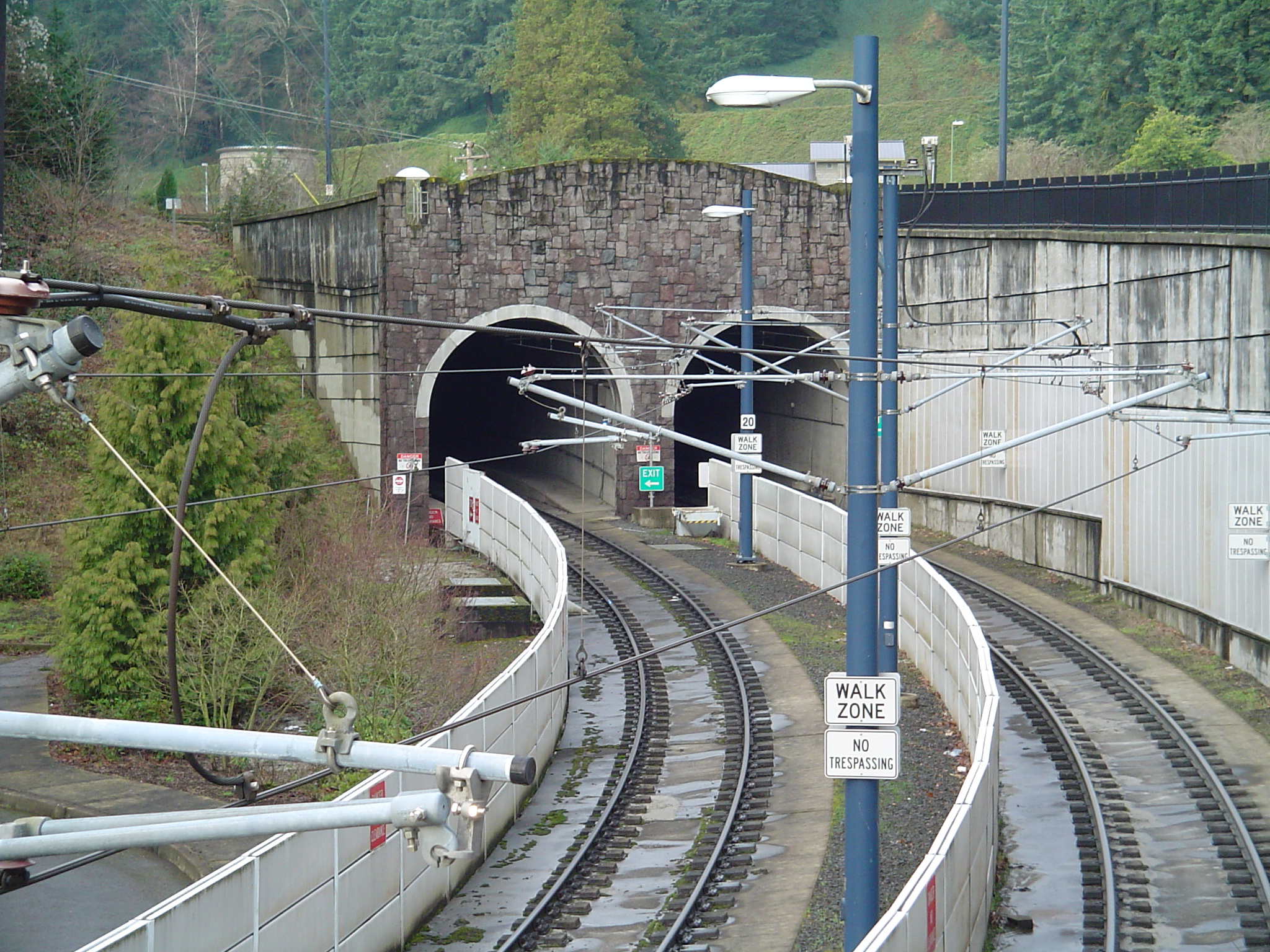
East portal of the Robertson Tunnel in Portland's Goose Hollow neighborhood

Funding for the westside extension proved difficult to obtain under the Reagan Administration, which sought to reduce federal expenditures by delaying existing light rail projects and declining to approve future planning. As members of their respective appropriations committees, U.S. Senator Mark Hatfield and U.S. Representative Les AuCoin secured preliminary engineering and environmental review grants in 1989 by withholding funds from the head of UMTA's office. In 1990, Congress adopted legislation requiring the federal government to cover a 75 percent share of transit projects approved within the fiscal year. Voters subsequently rejected a measure to permit the use of local vehicle registration fees for public transit, which would have covered Oregon's 25 percent share, defeating it 52 percent to 48 percent. With a year-end deadline approaching the 25 percent local-share stipulation, TriMet introduced a $125 million local bond measure in July 1990. Portland area voters overwhelmingly approved the ballot measure, which earned 74 percent average approval the following November. This marked the region's first successful vote approving public transportation. The Federal Transit Administration (the new name for UMTA) completed the funding package in 1991, granting $515 million to build the line up to 185th Avenue. It provided another $75 million in 1994 following the approval of the Hillsboro extension, which covered one-third of the segment's $224 million additional cost.

Construction of the Westside MAX began in August 1993 with the excavation of the 21-foot-diameter (6.4 m) Robertson Tunnel. Several alternative alignments through the West Hills were studied, including an all-surface option along the Sunset Highway, an option with a half-mile-long (0.8 km) "short tunnel", and an option with a 3-mile (4.8 km) "long tunnel". TriMet chose the "long tunnel" in April 1991. Frontier-Traylor, the project's general contractor, used conventional drilling and blasting techniques to dig through the west end. On the east segment, a 278-foot (85 m) tunnel boring machine was used to drill for two miles. Highly fragmented rock initially made machine excavation difficult, delaying the project for nine months. The $166.9 million tunnel was completed in 1997. It houses the 260-foot-deep (79 m) Washington Park station, currently the system's only underground station and the deepest transit station in North America.

Work along Oregon Highway 217 started in March 1994. Initially planned to run alongside freight trains through Beaverton and Hillsboro, the alignment was replaced with light rail following TriMet's acquisition of the BN right-of-way in June. The 600-foot-long (180 m) horseshoe tunnel below Sunset Highway was completed in July 1995 and all highway work ceased in December. Track work commenced west of 185th Avenue around the time the Elmonica Yard opened in January 1996. It was built to accommodate some of the 39 Siemens cars TriMet procured. The model SD660 low-floor cars, jointly developed by TriMet and Siemens, became notable as the first low-floor light rail vehicles in North America. The final rail spike was driven on Hillsboro's Main Street Bridge in October 1997. System testing took place in June 1998.

=== Opening ===
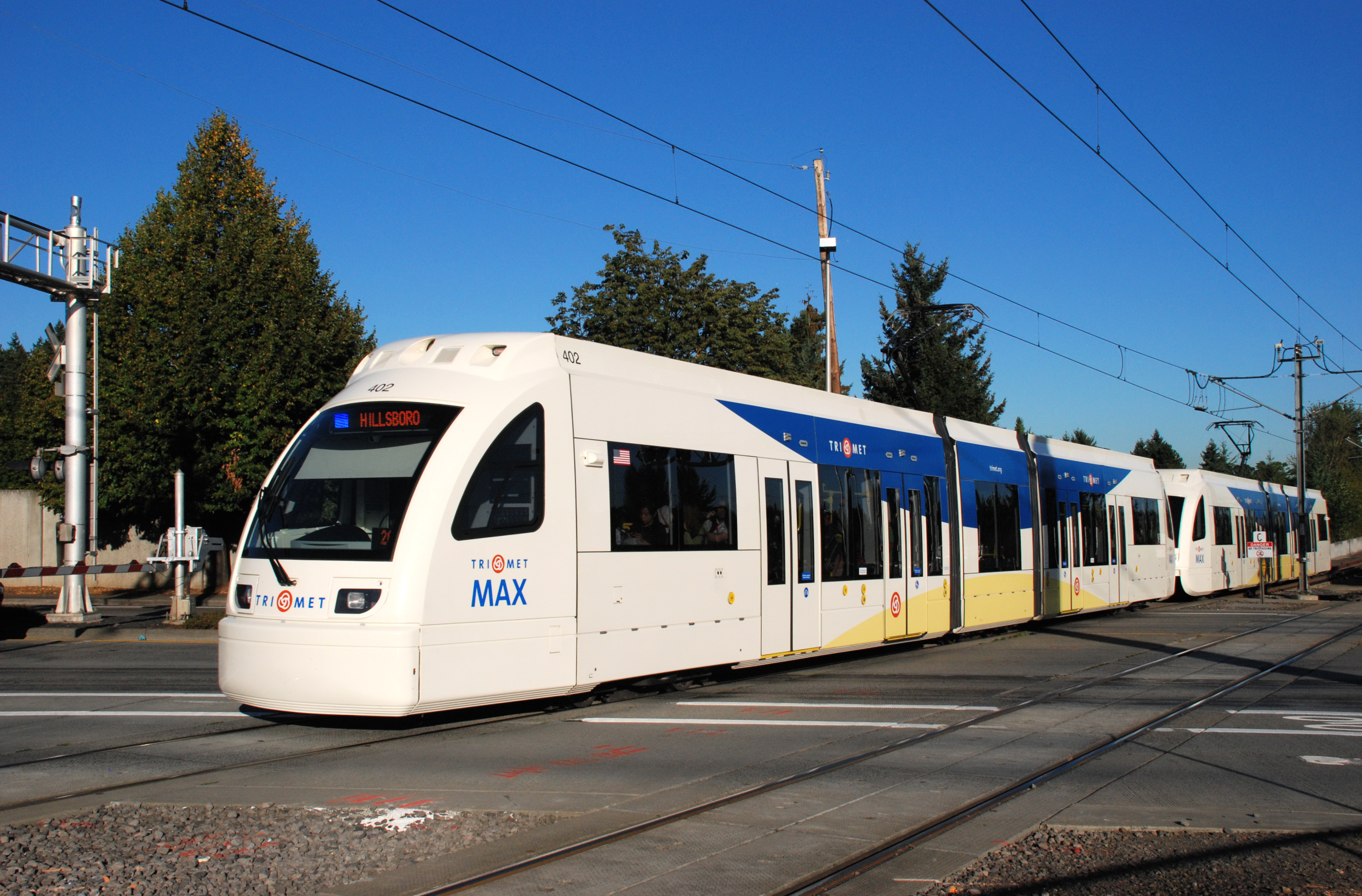
A two-car train crossing 185th Avenue and entering Hillsboro

Owing to delays caused by tunneling work, the line's planned September 1997 opening up to 185th Avenue was postponed by one year. On August 31, 1997, the Westside MAX opened its first section, a two-station extension west to the Civic Stadium and Kings Hill/SW Salmon Street, in conjunction with the entry into service of the first low-floor cars. Grand opening celebrations for the entire $963.5 million (equivalent to $1.77 billion in 2025 dollars) line took place on September 12, 1998. Ceremonies were held at various stations and speeches were delivered by local and national dignitaries, including Vice President Al Gore. Twelve TriMet bus routes, which had operated between the west side and downtown Portland, were reduced to five, replaced by light rail. The line immediately drew strong ridership, exceeding projections for 2005 less than two years after it opened. In September 2000, TriMet adopted a color coding scheme to differentiate its trains operating between Hillsboro and Gresham from those that were going to serve the Airport MAX extension, assigning the colors blue and red, respectively. The line-identification system was implemented shortly before the Red Line's opening on September 10, 2001.

=== Proposed extension to Forest Grove ===
In February 2006, local government officials proposed an extension of the Westside MAX from its Hatfield Government Center terminus to Forest Grove. City leaders approached a former TriMet engineer to conduct a feasibility study and develop a plan to get the project included in Metro's Joint Policy Advisory Committee on Transportation list of priority projects. The six-month study, completed in October, estimated a cost of about $200 million to build the segment. The study identified a best route option using existing tracks between Southwest Adams Avenue in Hillsboro and Douglas Street in Forest Grove. The tracks, which were formerly owned by OE, are currently state-owned with operating rights assigned to the Portland and Western Railroad. Metro proposes a high-capacity transit extension to Forest Grove as part of its 2018 Regional Transportation Plan for 2040 but does not specify the type of high-capacity transit, which could either be a bus or a rail option.

== Route ==
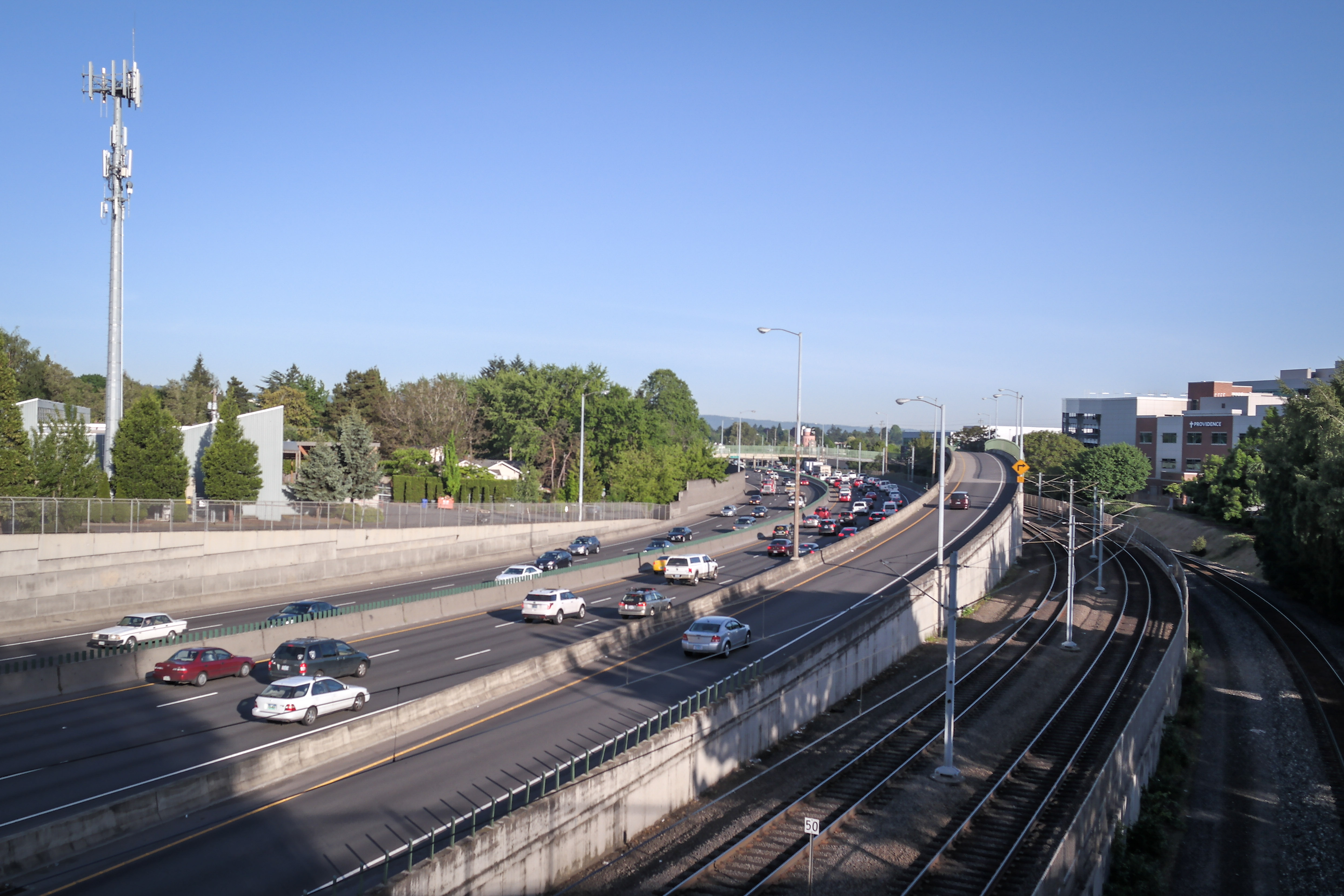
A section of the light rail tracks next to the Banfield Freeway

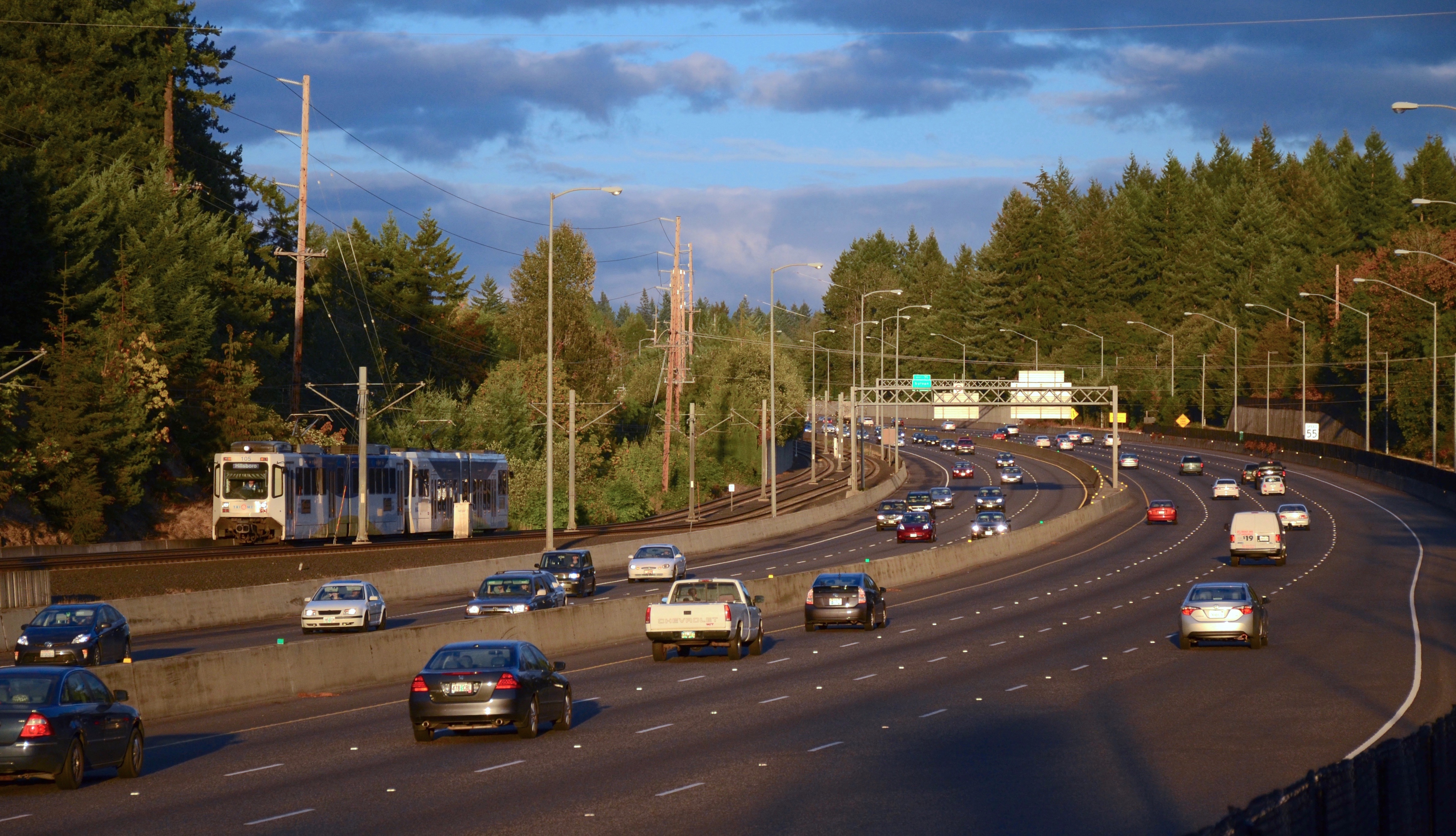
A MAX train next to the Sunset Highway, east of Sunset Transit Center

The Blue Line operates along the Eastside and Westside MAX segments, which combined total 32.6 miles (52.5 km) to 32.7 miles (52.6 km). Its western terminus is Hatfield Government Center in Hillsboro, on the corner of West Main Street and Southwest Adams Avenue. From there, the line heads east along the median of Southeast Washington Street and continues east on a former BN—former OE—right-of-way between Southeast 10th Avenue and Northwest 185th Avenue, traveling mostly at-grade except at grade-separated crossings—notably, the Main Street Bridge and Cornelius Pass Road—until it reaches Beaverton Transit Center. It then turns north, running adjacent to Oregon Highway 217 to Sunset Transit Center. From there it continues eastwards along the north side of the Sunset Highway before entering the Robertson Tunnel for Washington Park station. After leaving the tunnel, the line passes below the Vista Bridge and enters downtown Portland, continuing along Southwest Jefferson Street before turning north onto the median of Southwest 18th Avenue.

Near Providence Park, the tracks diverge eastbound onto Southwest Yamhill Street and westbound onto Southwest Morrison Street, crossing the Portland Transit Mall near the Pioneer Courthouse and Pioneer Courthouse Square. The tracks reconnect on Southwest 1st Avenue and head north, traversing the Willamette River via the Steel Bridge into the Rose Quarter. The line runs along Holladay Street in the Rose Quarter and the Lloyd District, passing the Moda Center and the Oregon Convention Center. It enters its grade-separated segment along the north bank of the Banfield Freeway at Sullivan's Gulch. The line then travels over the Interstate 84 and Interstate 205 interchange towards Gateway/Northeast 99th Avenue Transit Center. From Gateway Transit Center, tracks head south along the east side of I-205. A single-track junction south of Gateway Transit Center marks the start of the Airport MAX segment while a double junction south of Southeast Glisan Street splits into the I-205 MAX. The Blue Line turns east and enters the median of East Burnside Street at East 97th Avenue. At Ruby Junction/East 197th Avenue station, the line leaves the street and heads southeastwards until it reaches Cleveland Avenue station, its last stop, near the corner of Northeast Cleveland Avenue and Northeast 8th Street in Gresham.

The Blue Line shares much of its alignment with the Red Line. Between 2001 and 2003, they used the same tracks from the 11th Avenue loop tracks in downtown Portland to Gateway Transit Center, where Red Line trains diverge towards Portland International Airport. Since 2024, they have shared the same route between Hillsboro Airport/Fairgrounds station and Gateway Transit Center. The Green Line joined a part of this shared alignment in 2009, entering from the Portland Transit Mall just west of the Steel Bridge, diverging at Gateway Transit Center, and continuing south towards Clackamas.

A geographic map of the MAX Blue Line (in red) relative to the rest of the network (in black) with icons marking the line's termini. The official system schematic can be viewed on the TriMet website.

=== Stations ===
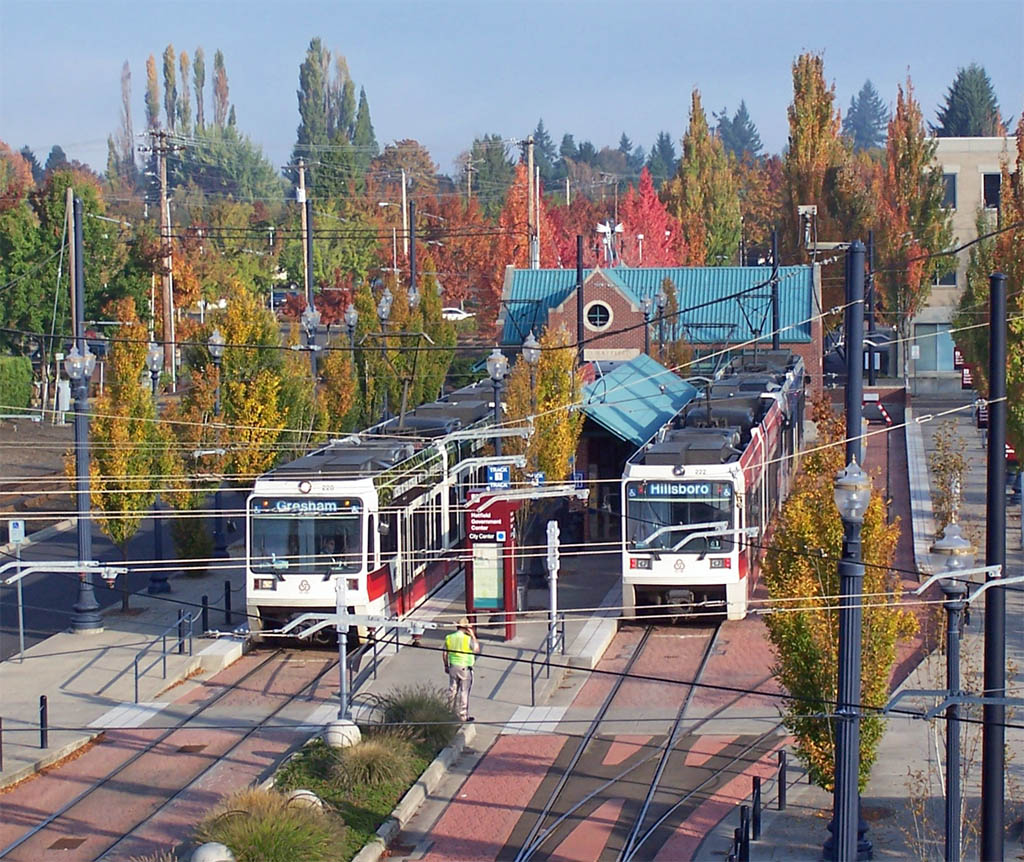
Hatfield Government Center station, the Blue Line's western terminus

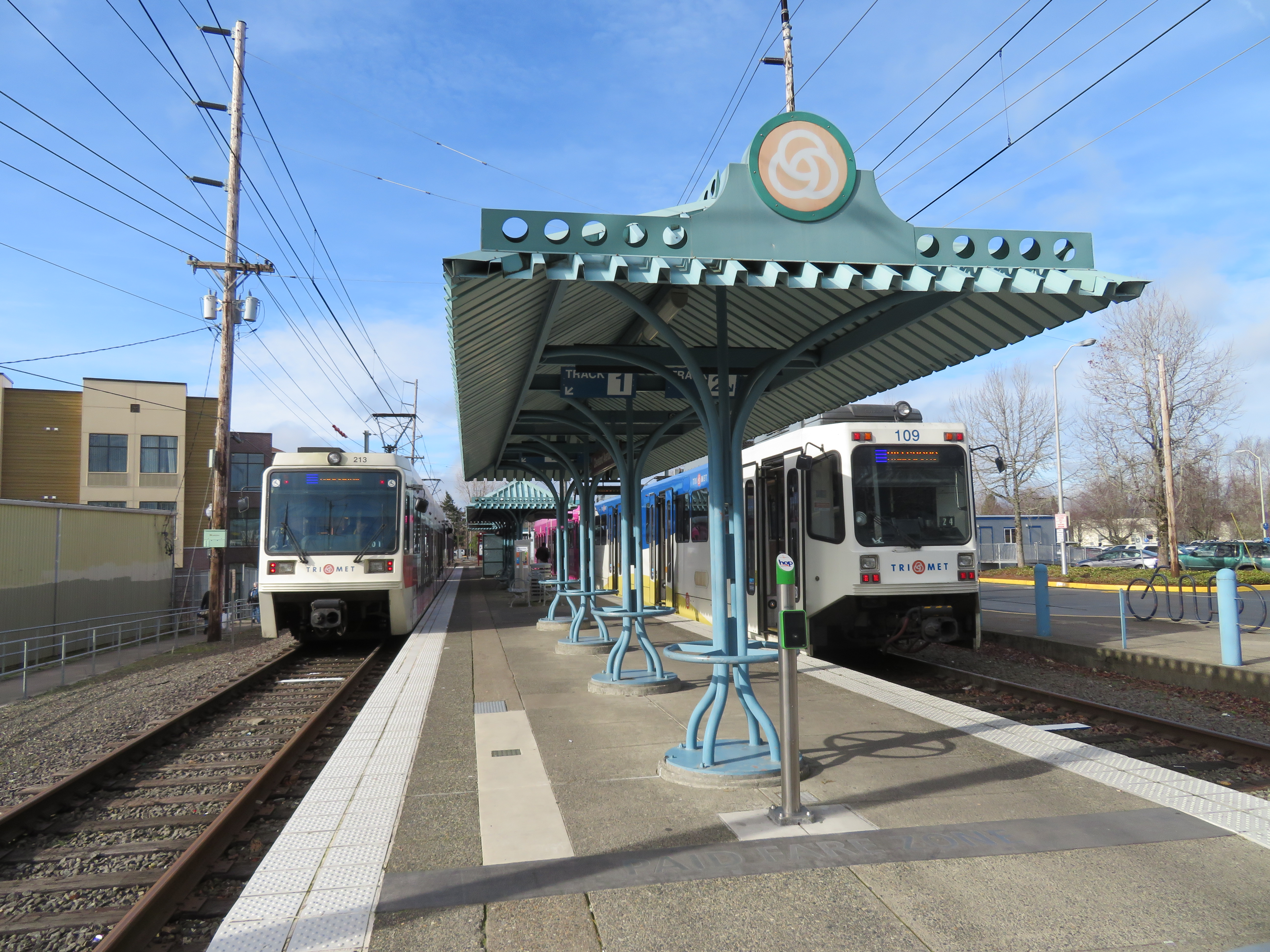
Cleveland Avenue station, the Blue Line's eastern terminus

The Blue Line serves 47 stations. The 27 stations built as part of the inaugural line between Gresham and downtown Portland opened on September 5, 1986. The Mall stations on Southwest 4th and 5th avenues were added in conjunction with the opening of Pioneer Place in March 1990, followed by the Convention Center station and the Oregon Convention Center in September. The Westside MAX opened in two stages due to delays in construction. The first two stations, Civic Stadium—now Providence Park—and Kings Hill/Southwest Salmon Street, opened on August 31, 1997. The remaining 18 stations opened during the segment's inauguration on September 12, 1998. The newest station is Civic Drive, which was opened on December 1, 2010.

On July 24, 2019, TriMet announced the permanent closure of the Mall stations, as well as a one-year pilot closure of Kings Hill/Southwest Salmon Street station, in an effort to speed up travel times. The closures took effect on March 1, 2020. On August 4, 2025, TriMet announced the permanent closure of Skidmore Fountain station. The closure took effect on August 24, 2025.

Transfers to the Yellow Line are available at the Pioneer Square stations and Rose Quarter Transit Center, while transfers to the Green Line (beyond the shared Eastside MAX alignment) and the Orange Line can be made at the Pioneer Square stations. Additionally, the Blue Line provides connections to local and intercity bus services at various stops across the line, the Portland Streetcar at four stops in and near downtown Portland, and a transfer to WES Commuter Rail, which runs from Beaverton to Wilsonville during the morning and evening commutes on weekdays, at Beaverton Transit Center.

Key
| Icon | Purpose |
|---|---|
| → | Eastbound travel only |
| ← | Westbound travel only |

List of MAX Blue Line stations
| Station | Connections | Began service | Location |
|---|---|---|---|
| Hatfield Government Center | | September 12, 1998 | Hillsboro |
| Hillsboro Central/SE 3rd Ave Transit Center | | September 12, 1998 | Hillsboro |
| Hillsboro Health District | | September 12, 1998 | Hillsboro |
| Washington/SE 12th Ave | | September 12, 1998 | Hillsboro |
| Hillsboro Airport/Fairgrounds | Red Line | September 12, 1998 | Hillsboro |
| Hawthorn Farm | Red Line | September 12, 1998 | Hillsboro |
| Orenco | Red Line | September 12, 1998 | Hillsboro |
| Quatama | Red Line | September 12, 1998 | Hillsboro |
| Willow Creek/SW 185th Ave Transit Center | Red Line | September 12, 1998 | Hillsboro |
| Elmonica/SW 170th Ave | Red Line | September 12, 1998 | Beaverton |
| Merlo Rd/SW 158th Ave | Red Line | September 12, 1998 | Beaverton |
| Beaverton Creek | Red Line | September 12, 1998 | Beaverton |
| Millikan Way | Red Line | September 12, 1998 | Beaverton |
| Beaverton Central | Red Line | September 12, 1998 | Beaverton |
| Beaverton Transit Center | Red Line; WES Commuter Rail | September 12, 1998 | Beaverton |
| Sunset Transit Center | Red Line | September 12, 1998 | Beaverton |
| Washington Park | Red Line | September 12, 1998 | Portland |
| Goose Hollow/SW Jefferson St | Red Line | September 12, 1998 | Portland |
| Providence Park | Red Line | August 31, 1997 | Portland |
| Library/SW 9th Ave→ | Red Line; A Loop (at Central Library); B Loop (at SW 11th & Taylor); NS Line (at Central Library and SW 11th & Taylor) | September 5, 1986 | Portland |
| Galleria/SW 10th Ave← | Red Line; A Loop (at SW 10th & Alder); B Loop (at SW 11th & Alder); NS Line (at SW 10th & Alder and SW 11th & Alder) | September 5, 1986 | Portland |
| Pioneer Square South→ | Red Line; Orange Line (at Pioneer Courthouse/SW 6th and Pioneer Place/SW 5th); Yellow Line (at Pioneer Courthouse/SW 6th and Pioneer Place/SW 5th); Portland Transit Mall | September 5, 1986 | Portland |
| Pioneer Square North← | Red Line; Orange Line (at Pioneer Courthouse/SW 6th and Pioneer Place/SW 5th); Yellow Line (at Pioneer Courthouse/SW 6th and Pioneer Place/SW 5th); Portland Transit Mall | September 5, 1986 | Portland |
| Yamhill District→ | Red Line | September 5, 1986 | Portland |
| Morrison/SW 3rd Ave← | Red Line | September 5, 1986 | Portland |
| Oak St/SW 1st Ave | Red Line | September 5, 1986 | Portland |
| Old Town/Chinatown | Red Line | September 5, 1986 | Portland |
| Rose Quarter Transit Center | Red Line; Yellow Line (at Interstate/Rose Quarter) | September 5, 1986 | Portland |
| Convention Center | Red Line; B Loop (at NE Grand & Holladay) | September 20, 1990 | Portland |
| NE 7th Ave | Red Line; A Loop (at NE 7th & Holladay) | September 5, 1986 | Portland |
| Lloyd Center/NE 11th Ave | Red Line | September 5, 1986 | Portland |
| Hollywood/NE 42nd Ave | Red Line | September 5, 1986 | Portland |
| NE 60th Ave | Red Line | September 5, 1986 | Portland |
| NE 82nd Ave | Red Line | September 5, 1986 | Portland |
| Gateway/NE 99th Ave Transit Center | Green Line; Red Line (westbound at Gateway North) | September 5, 1986 | Portland |
| E 102nd Ave | | September 5, 1986 | Portland |
| E 122nd Ave | | September 5, 1986 | Portland |
| E 148th Ave | | September 5, 1986 | Portland |
| E 162nd Ave | | September 5, 1986 | Gresham |
| E 172nd Ave | | September 5, 1986 | Gresham |
| E 181st Ave | | September 5, 1986 | Gresham |
| Rockwood/E 188th Ave | | September 5, 1986 | Gresham |
| Ruby Junction/E 197th Ave | | September 5, 1986 | Gresham |
| Civic Drive | | December 1, 2010 | Gresham |
| Gresham City Hall | | September 5, 1986 | Gresham |
| Gresham Central Transit Center | | September 5, 1986 | Gresham |
| Cleveland Ave | | September 5, 1986 | Gresham |

=== Transit-oriented development ===
In an Institute for Transportation and Development Policy study conducted in September 2013, the Blue Line was credited with generating $6.6 billion in transit-oriented development investment.

== Service ==
From Monday to Thursday, the Blue Line runs for 22 1/2 hours per day. The first train goes westbound from Elmonica/Southwest 170th Avenue station at 3:31 am and the last trip goes eastbound from Rose Quarter Transit Center to Ruby Junction/East 197th Avenue station at 1:29 am the following day. Additional late-night trips are provided on Fridays, with the last trip going eastbound from Hatfield Government Center station to Elmonica/Southwest 170th Avenue station at 2:01 am. Except for additional late-night trips on Saturdays, weekend service runs on a slightly reduced schedule. The first trains run westbound from Ruby Junction/East 197th Avenue station at 3:35 am and the last trains run eastbound from Hatfield Government Center station at 1:51 am and Rose Quarter Transit Center at 1:33 am, respectively. Select early morning trains operate as through services of the Red Line and the Yellow Line. End-to-end travel time is approximately 105 minutes. TriMet designates the Blue Line as a "Frequent Service" route along with the rest of the light rail system, ensuring service runs on a 15-minute headway for most of each day. Blue Line trains run most frequently during weekday rush hours, operating on headways as short as five minutes. During the early mornings and late evenings, headways increase to 30 minutes.

=== Ridership ===
During construction, the Eastside MAX was projected to carry 12,000 riders per day. It averaged 22,000 during its first four days and had leveled at 18,000 by December 1986. In June 1987, TriMet's general manager, James Cowen, stated that MAX ridership had grown to a point where it was "at peak all day" with a farebox recovery ratio of 50 percent. Two years after the opening of the Westside MAX, the system had been recording over 71,000 daily riders, a figure that was not anticipated until 2005. To relieve overcrowding, TriMet extended the Red Line further west to Beaverton Transit Center on August 31, 2003. From 2004 to 2007, TriMet recorded 18 percent and 27 percent increases in utilization between Hatfield Government Center station and Beaverton Transit Center during morning and evening rush hours, respectively, prompting the agency to add three Red Line trains running up to Hatfield Government Center on March 2, 2008. In the first three months of 2017, the Blue Line recorded an average 55,233 rides per weekday, a drop of 2.9 percent from the same period in 2016. TriMet attributes the drop to lower-income riders being forced out of the inner city by rising housing prices. The Blue Line is currently the busiest line in the MAX system, carrying 18.9 million passengers in 2015. It averaged 25,019 riders on weekdays in May 2025, out of a total system ridership of 67,058 daily riders.
