= Skidmore Fountain station =

Former light rail station in Portland, Oregon, U.S.

Skidmore Fountain
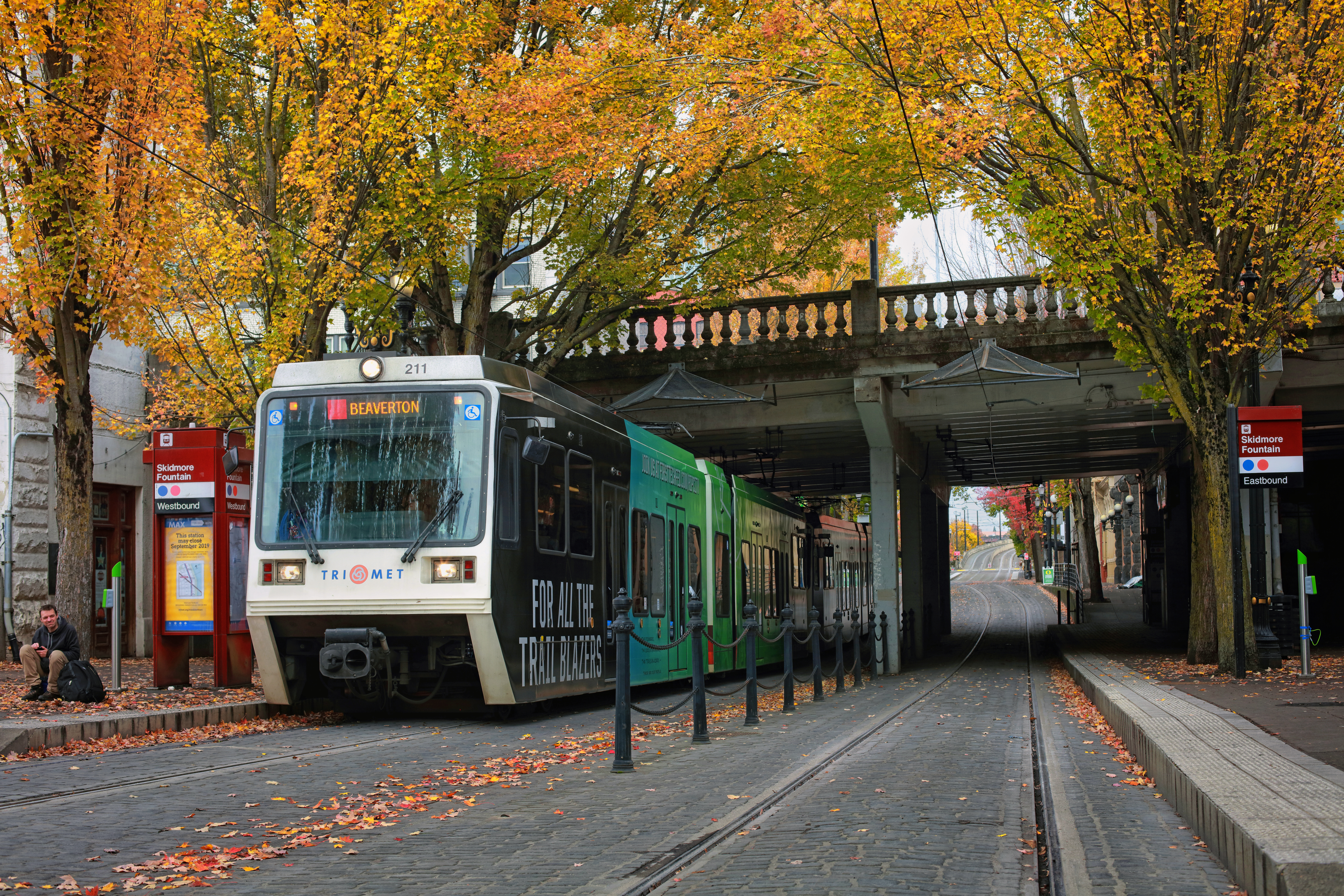
- Red Line train at Skidmore Fountain station

General information
- Location: SW 1st Ave below the Burnside Bridge, Portland, Oregon; USA
- Coordinates: 45°31′23″N 122°40′17″W
- System: Former MAX Light Rail station
- Owner: TriMet
- Platforms: 2 side platforms
- Tracks: 2
- Connections: TriMet: 12, 19, 20

Construction
- Cycle facilities: bike lockers
- Accessible: yes

History
- Opened: September 5, 1986
- Closed: August 24, 2025
Former services
| Preceding station | TriMet | Following station |
|---|---|---|
| Oak St/SW 1st Ave toward Hatfield Government Center | Blue Line 1986–2025 | Old Town/Chinatown toward Cleveland Ave |
| Oak St/SW 1st Ave toward Hillsboro Airport/Fairgrounds | Red Line 2001–2025 | Old Town/Chinatown toward Portland Airport |
| Oak St/SW 1st Ave toward Galleria/SW 10th Ave | Yellow Line 2004–2009 | Old Town/Chinatown toward Expo Center |
| Oak St/SW 1st Ave toward Galleria/SW 10th Ave | Portland Vintage Trolley 1991–2009 | Old Town/Chinatown toward Northeast 11th Avenue |
Location

Skidmore Fountain station is a disused light rail station on the MAX Blue and Red Lines in Portland, Oregon that closed in August 2025. It was the fifth stop eastbound on the Eastside MAX. It was previously also served by the Yellow Line, from 2004 to 2009, until that line's relocation to the Portland Transit Mall.

The station had side platforms that were built into the sidewalk. Located under the west approach of the Burnside Bridge at the intersection of Burnside Street and Southwest 1st Avenue, it previously served the Tom McCall Waterfront Park, the Portland Saturday Market, and Skidmore Fountain before the station’s closure.

== Bus connections ==
This station was served by the following bus lines:

- 12 – Barbur/Sandy Blvd
- 19 – Woodstock/Glisan
- 20 – Burnside/Stark

(ID number 689)

== Closure ==
Skidmore Fountain station permanently closed on August 24, 2025 due to the low number of riders using the station and its proximity to other stations on the Red and Blue lines. The closure was proposed in 2018 as part of a program to improve travel times along the MAX system, particularly in Downtown Portland.
