= Oak St/SW 1st Ave station =

Light rail station in Portland, Oregon, U.S.

Oak St/SW 1st Ave
- The station in 2026

General information
- Location: SW Oak Street & 1st Ave; Portland, Oregon; USA
- Coordinates: 45°31′12″N 122°40′20″W
- Owner: TriMet
- Platforms: Side platforms
- Tracks: 2
- Connections: TriMet: 16

Construction
- Cycle facilities: bike lockers
- Accessible: yes

History
- Opened: September 5, 1986

Services
Preceding station	TriMet	Following station
Morrison/SW 3rd Ave toward Hatfield Government Center	Blue Line	Old Town/Chinatown toward Cleveland Ave
Yamhill District One-way operation	Blue Line	Old Town/Chinatown toward Cleveland Ave
Morrison/SW 3rd Ave toward Hillsboro Airport/Fairgrounds	Red Line	Old Town/Chinatown toward Portland Airport
Yamhill District One-way operation	Red Line	Old Town/Chinatown toward Portland Airport
Former services
Preceding station	TriMet	Following station
Morrison/SW 3rd Ave toward Hatfield Government Center	Blue Line 1986–2025	Skidmore Fountain (closed) toward Cleveland Ave
Yamhill District One-way operation	Blue Line 1986–2025	Skidmore Fountain (closed) toward Cleveland Ave
Morrison/SW 3rd Ave toward Hillsboro Airport/Fairgrounds	Red Line 2001–2025	Skidmore Fountain (closed) toward Portland Airport
Yamhill District One-way operation	Red Line 2001–2025	Skidmore Fountain (closed) toward Portland Airport
Morrison/SW 3rd Ave toward Galleria/SW 10th Ave	Yellow Line 2004–2009	Skidmore Fountain (closed) toward Expo Center
Yamhill District One-way operation	Yellow Line 2004–2009	Skidmore Fountain (closed) toward Expo Center
Morrison/SW 3rd Ave toward Galleria/SW 10th Ave	Portland Vintage Trolley 1991–2009	Skidmore Fountain (closed) toward Northeast 11th Avenue
Yamhill District One-way operation	Portland Vintage Trolley 1991–2009	Skidmore Fountain (closed) toward Northeast 11th Avenue
Location

Oak Street/Southwest 1st Avenue is a light rail station on the MAX Blue and Red Lines in Portland, Oregon. It is the 4th stop on the current Eastside MAX. It was previously also served by the Yellow Line, from 2004 to 2009, until that line's relocation to the Portland Transit Mall.

The station has side platforms built into the sidewalk. Located on 1st Avenue and spanning the block from Oak Street to Stark Street, it serves office buildings and art galleries, as well as Tom McCall Waterfront Park.

== Bus line connections ==
This station on Southwest Oak Street is served by the following bus line:

- 16 - NW Front Ave (one direction only) (stop ID number 12798)
