= Mall/SW 4th Ave and Mall/SW 5th Ave stations =

Former light rail stations in Portland, Oregon, U.S.

Mall/SW 4th Ave and Mall/SW 5th Ave
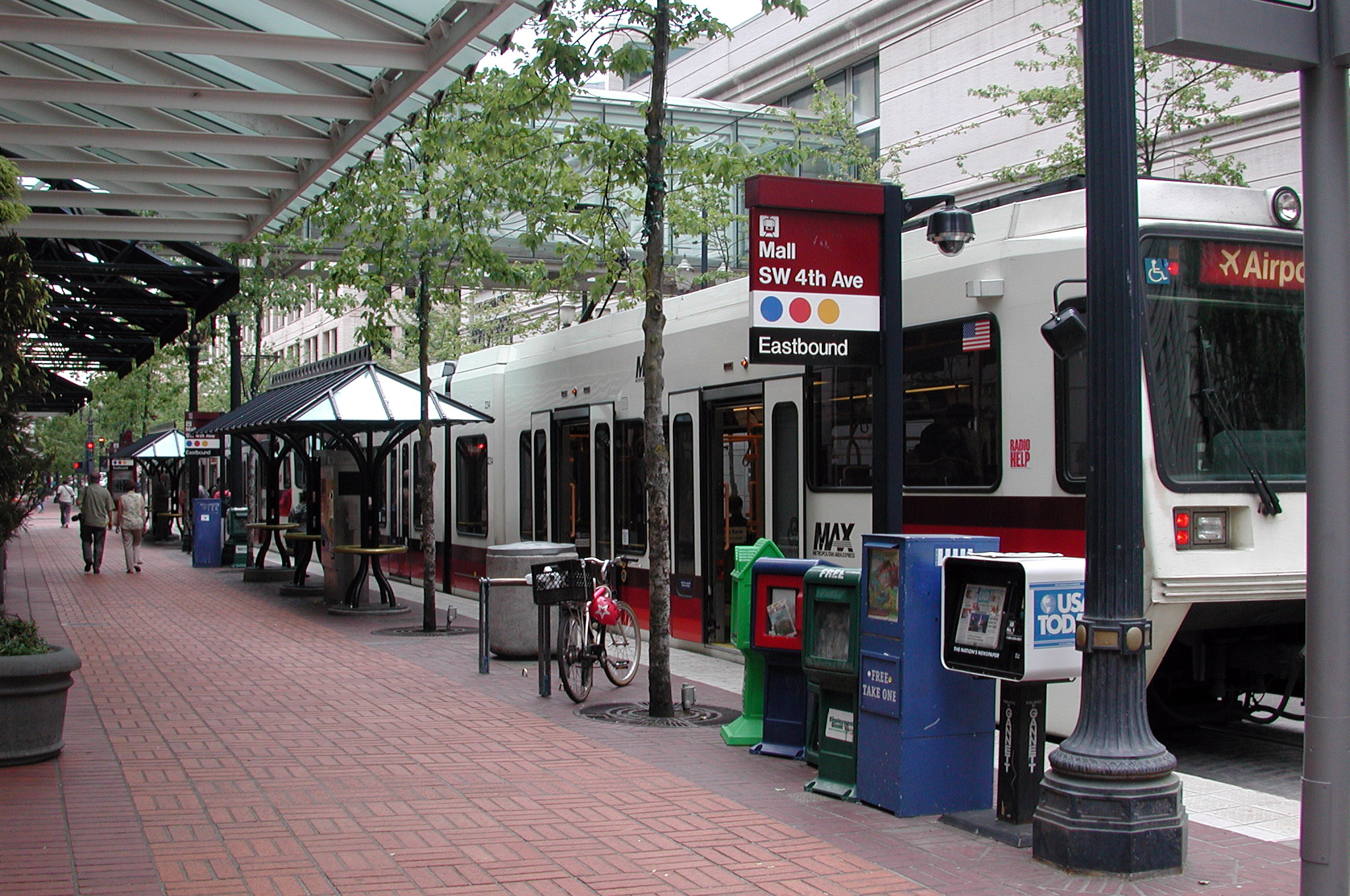
- An eastbound Red Line train stopped at Mall/SW 4th Ave station in 2009

General information
- Location: Southwest 4th & Yamhill (eastbound) and Southwest 5th & Morrison (westbound); Portland, Oregon, U.S.
- Coordinates: 45°31′06″N 122°40′38″W
- Platforms: 2 one-way side platforms
- Tracks: 1 per split

History
- Opened: March 26, 1990
- Closed: March 1, 2020
Former services
Preceding station	TriMet	Following station
Mall/SW 5th Avenue
Pioneer Square North toward Hatfield Government Center	Blue Line 1990–2020	Morrison/SW 3rd Ave One-way operation
Pioneer Square North toward Hillsboro Airport/Fairgrounds	Red Line 2001–2020	Morrison/SW 3rd Ave One-way operation
Pioneer Square North toward Galleria/SW 10th Ave	Yellow Line 2004–2009	Morrison/SW 3rd Ave One-way operation
Pioneer Square North toward Galleria/SW 10th Ave	Portland Vintage Trolley 1991–2009	Morrison/SW 3rd Ave One-way operation
Mall/SW 4th Avenue
Pioneer Square South One-way operation	Blue Line 1990–2020	Yamhill District toward Cleveland Ave
Pioneer Square South One-way operation	Red Line 2001–2020	Yamhill District toward Portland Airport
Pioneer Square South One-way operation	Yellow Line 2004–2009	Yamhill District toward Expo Center
Pioneer Square South One-way operation	Portland Vintage Trolley 1991–2009	Yamhill District toward Northeast 11th Avenue
Location

The Mall/SW 4th Avenue and Mall/SW 5th Avenue stations were a pair of light rail stations in Portland, Oregon, United States, served by TriMet as part of MAX Light Rail. Built into the sidewalks on Southwest Yamhill and Morrison streets between 4th and 5th avenues in downtown Portland, the west end of both stations was at the southbound street of the Portland Transit Mall.

MAX began operating in 1986 without stations at this location to make way for the Morrison Street redevelopment project. The stops were infilled during the construction of Pioneer Place and opened on March 26, 1990. On March 1, 2020, TriMet closed the stations in an effort to speed up MAX trains in downtown. The Mall stations were served by the Blue and Red lines upon closing, and they had also been served by the Yellow Line from May 2004 to August 2009.

== History ==
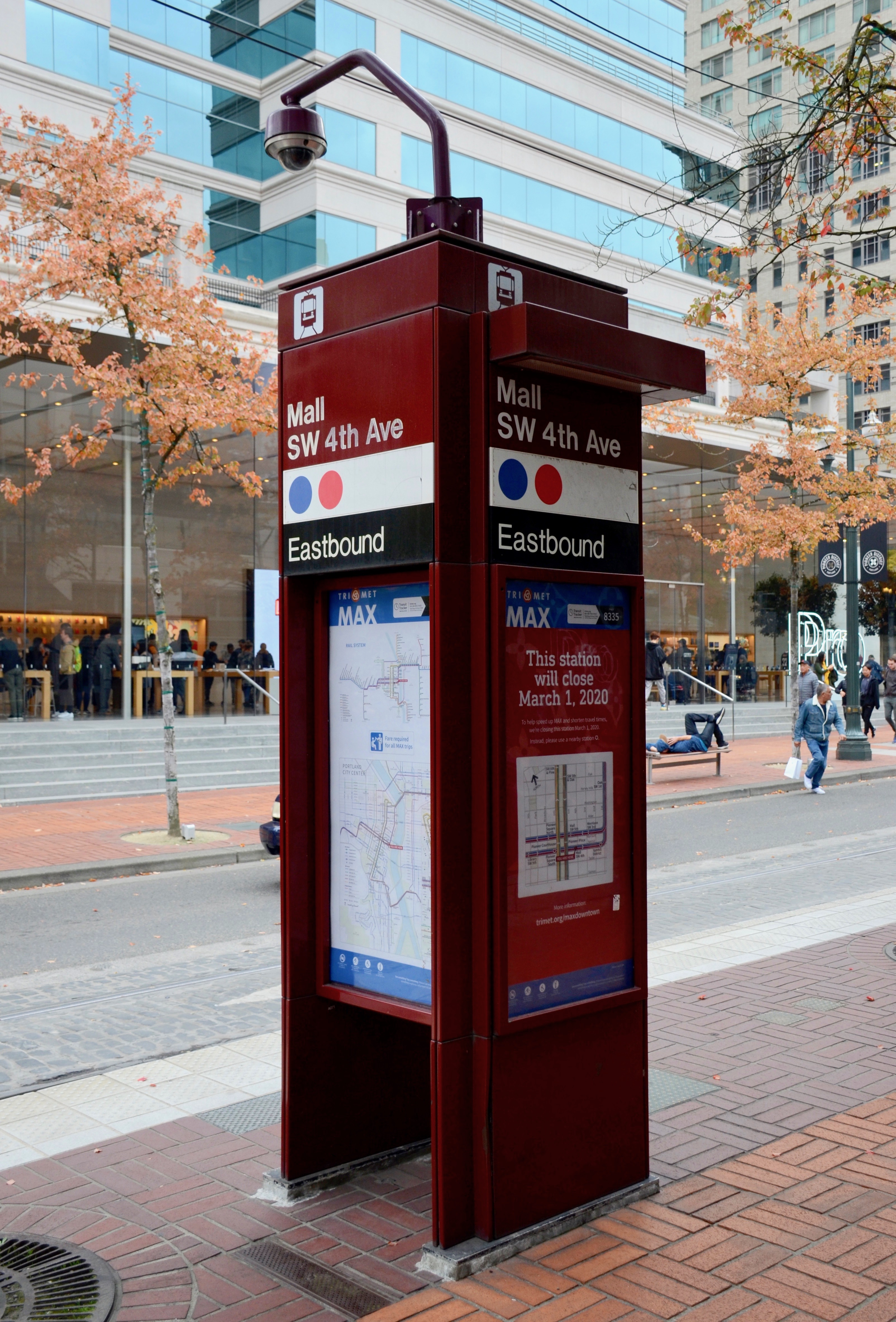
An information pylon at Mall/SW 4th Ave station with a sign indicating the station's planned closure

In July 1981, the Portland City Council presented the Morrison Street Project, a proposed redevelopment of three blocks in downtown Portland near the Portland Transit Mall, around the intersections of 5th and 6th avenues and Morrison and Yamhill streets. That November, TriMet published a conceptual design report for the Banfield Light Rail Project, which would traverse Morrison and Yamhill streets, that outlined a pair of light rail stations to serve the development. TriMet recommended platforms along the north end of the block southeast of the intersection of Southwest 5th Avenue and Morrison Street and along the opposite end of the same block on Yamhill Street.

In 1983, the Portland Development Commission (PDC) hired the Rouse Company to develop the Morrison Street Project. The developer designed a mall and mixed-use development proposal called "Pioneer Place". PDC approved Rouse's design, which included a 400-room hotel, 1,025 underground parking spaces, and buildings up to 25 stories high. In 1985, Rouse revealed that it was encountering problems signing tenants, citing a weak market for hotels and department stores, and announced a six-month delay in construction. After failing to secure key tenants the following year, the developer offered a scaled-down revision of its initial proposal and further postponed construction to 1987, a year after the scheduled completion of the Banfield Light Rail Project, which by then was formally named "Metropolitan Area Express" (MAX). MAX thus began operating on September 5, 1986, without a stop at this location.

PDC approved Rouse's scaled-down plans in October 1986. In December, the city council authorized the construction of a six-story parking garage for Pioneer Place on a fourth block bound by 3rd and 4th avenues and Yamhill and Taylor streets. The Oregon Court of Appeals ruled the following year that the city violated state law by condemning this fourth block without first seeking a review from Multnomah County, but the county board ultimately approved it. The groundbreaking of "Pioneer Place I", the first of a two-phase development plan of Pioneer Place, finally took place on March 3, 1988.

During the construction of Pioneer Place I, TriMet revisited its original plans and proposed infill stops to serve the development. The MAX platforms were ultimately built; the Mall stations—their names referring to the Portland Transit Mall—opened on March 26, 1990. In September 2001, the Red Line became a second MAX line to serve the stations while TriMet rebranded the original service as the "Blue Line". From May 2004 to August 2009, the Yellow Line also stopped at the Mall stations until TriMet rerouted it to the Portland Transit Mall.

After nearly 30 years in operation, TriMet closed the Mall stations on March 1, 2020, as part of a consolidation program to speed up MAX trains in downtown Portland. The area will continue to be served by the Blue and Red lines via the Pioneer Square South and Pioneer Square North stations, which are located two blocks to the west; and the Yamhill District and Morrison/SW 3rd Ave stations, which are located two blocks to the east.

== Station details ==
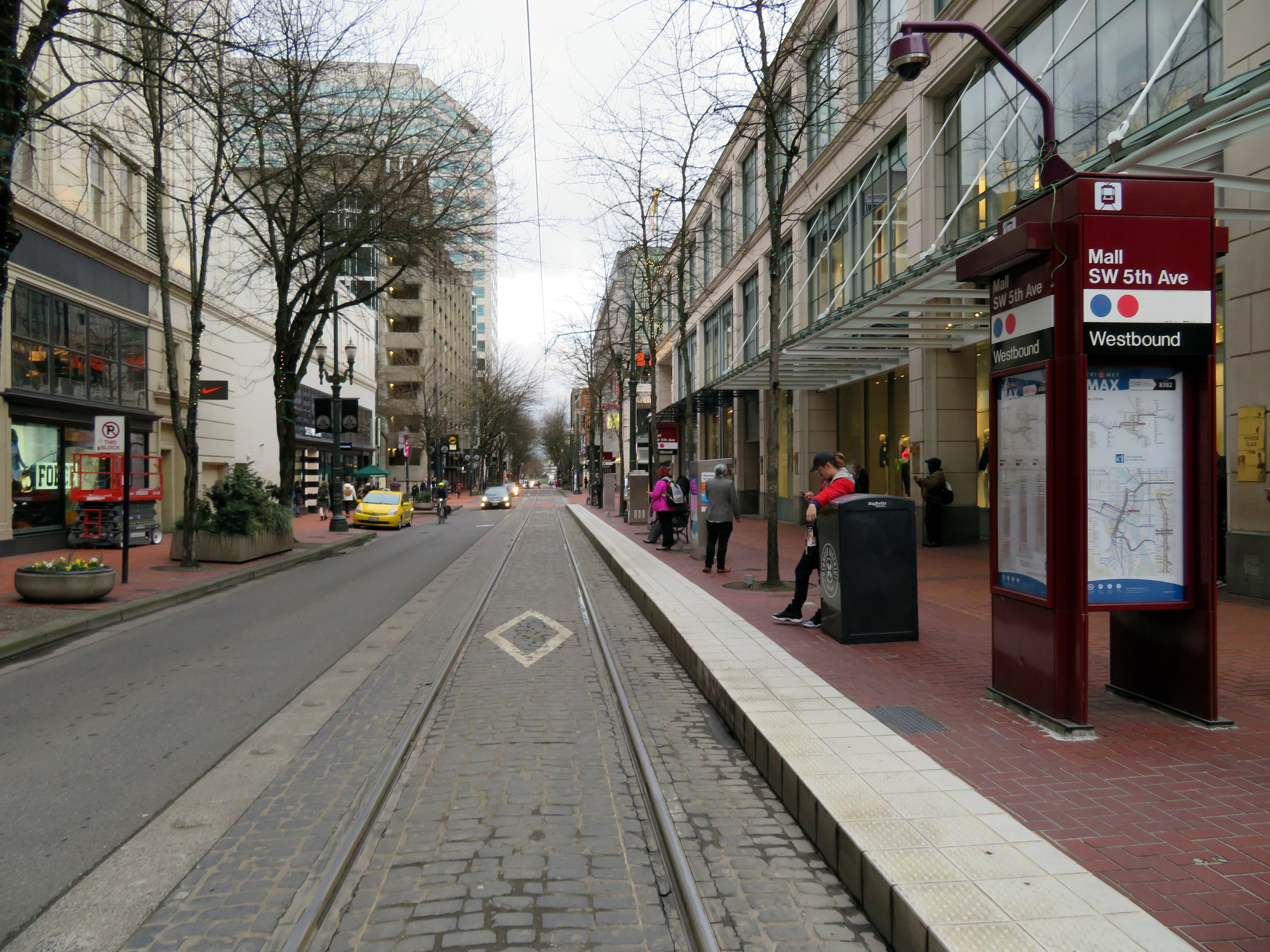
Mall/SW 5th Ave station in February 2018

The Mall stations occupied the sidewalks facing Southwest Yamhill and Morrison streets between 4th and 5th avenues in downtown Portland. Pioneer Place I is situated between the former platforms. The stations' amenities included benches, bicycle parking racks, garbage cans, shelters, and schedule information displays. The southbound MAX tracks on the Portland Transit Mall run along the immediate west side of the defunct platforms on 5th Avenue; this provided a direct transfer to the MAX platform of Pioneer Place/SW 5th station across the street, served by the Green and Orange lines. On the opposite end of this adjacent block, which is occupied by the Pioneer Courthouse, is the northbound MAX station, Pioneer Courthouse/SW 6th served by the Green and Yellow lines. The Mall stations also facilitated transfers to transit buses serving the Portland Transit Mall.

On the final day of service, the Mall stations were served by the MAX Blue Line, which connected the stations to Beaverton and Hillsboro to the west and Gresham to the east, and the MAX Red Line, which connected the stations to Beaverton to the west and Portland International Airport to the east. In the fall of 2019, Mall/SW 5th Ave and Mall/SW 4th Ave were the 25th and 39th busiest stations of the MAX network's 97 stations, respectively, based on TriMet's weekday on-and-off boarding totals; Mall/SW 5th Ave recorded 3,436 passengers on weekdays while Mall/SW 4th Ave recorded 2,467 passengers.
