= Old Town/Chinatown station =

Light rail station in Portland, Oregon, U.S.

Old Town/Chinatown
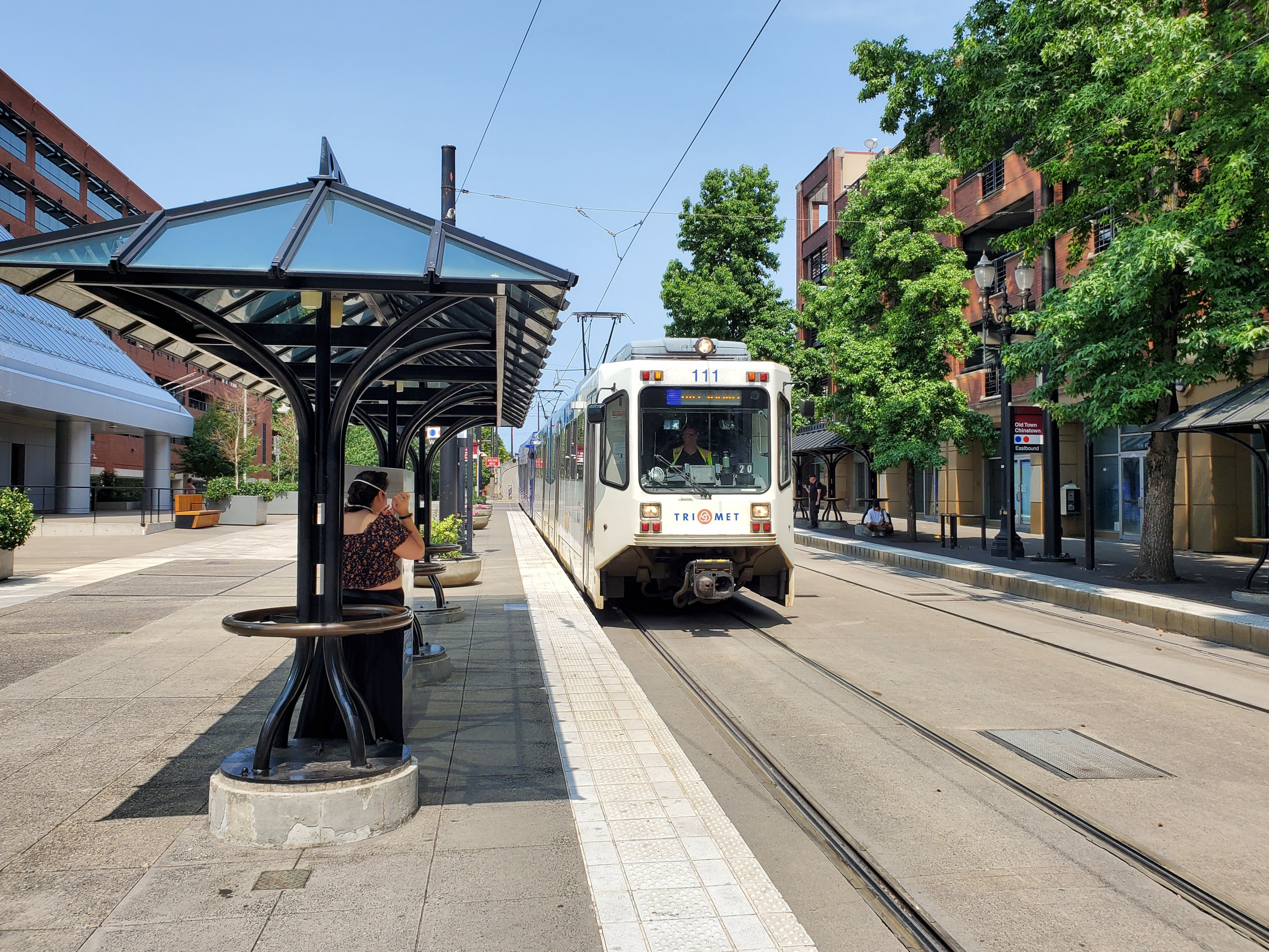
- A westbound Blue Line train at the station in 2024

General information
- Location: NW 1st Ave & Davis St; Portland, Oregon; USA
- Coordinates: 45°31′30″N 122°40′17″W
- Owner: TriMet
- Platforms: Side platforms
- Tracks: 2
- Connections: TriMet: 4, 8, 16, 17, 35, 40, 44, 77

Construction
- Cycle facilities: bike lockers
- Accessible: yes

History
- Opened: September 5, 1986

Services
Preceding station	TriMet	Following station
Oak St/SW 1st Ave toward Hatfield Government Center	Blue Line	Rose Quarter Transit Center toward Cleveland Ave
Oak St/SW 1st Ave toward Hillsboro Airport/Fairgrounds	Red Line	Rose Quarter Transit Center toward Portland Airport
Former services
Preceding station	TriMet	Following station
Skidmore Fountain (closed) toward Hatfield Government Center	Blue Line 1986–2025	Rose Quarter Transit Center toward Cleveland Ave
Skidmore Fountain (closed) toward Hillsboro Airport/Fairgrounds	Red Line 2001–2025	Rose Quarter Transit Center toward Portland Airport
Skidmore Fountain (closed) toward Galleria/SW 10th Ave	Yellow Line 2004–2009	Interstate/Rose Quarter toward Expo Center
Skidmore Fountain (closed) toward Galleria/SW 10th Ave	Portland Vintage Trolley 1991–2009	Rose Quarter Transit Center toward Northeast 11th Avenue
Location

Old Town/Chinatown station is a MAX Light Rail station served by the Blue and Red Lines. It is located in the Old Town Chinatown neighborhood in Portland, Oregon and is currently the 6th stop eastbound on the Eastside MAX. It is also the last stop before crossing the Willamette River. It is next to the Portland Downtown Heliport. The station was previously also served by the Yellow Line, from 2004 to 2009, until that line's relocation to the Portland Transit Mall.

The station has side platforms built into the sidewalk of NW First Avenue. It is just east of the Portland Classical Chinese Garden and is within walking distance of Union Station, including Amtrak, and the Greyhound bus station.

== Bus line connections ==
This station is served by the following bus lines:

- 4 – Fessenden/Woodstock
- 8 – Jackson Park/NE 15th
- 16 – NW Front Ave
- 17 – Holgate/NE 33rd
- 35 – Macadam/Greeley
- 40 – Tacoma/Swan Island
- 44 – Capitol Hwy/N Rosa Parks
- 77 – Broadway/Halsey
