= Yamhill District and Morrison/SW 3rd Ave stations =

Light rail stations in Oregon

Yamhill District Morrison/SW 3rd Ave
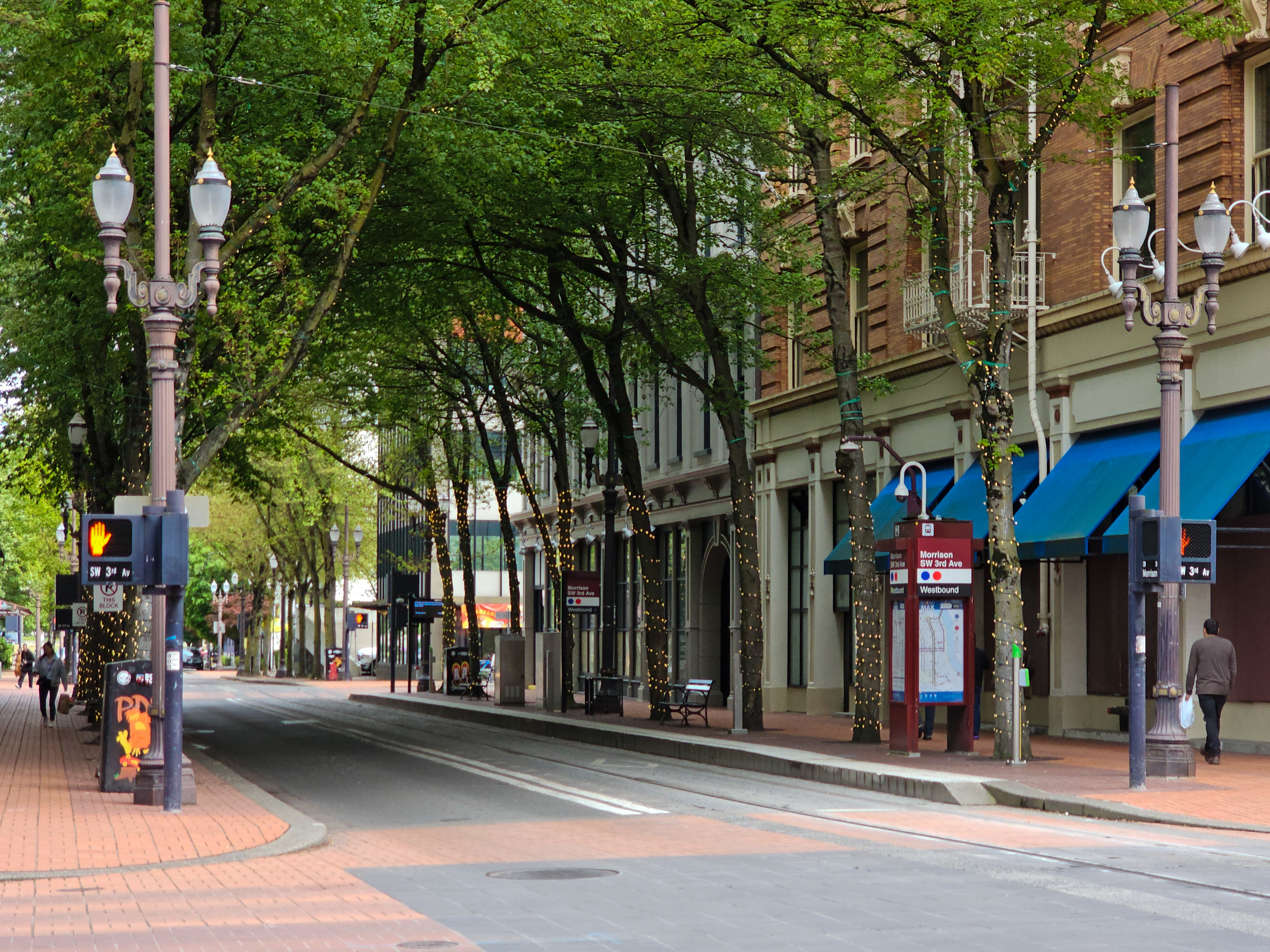
- The westbound platform of Morrison/SW 3rd Ave station in 2025

General information
- Location: SW 1st & Yamhill (eastbound); SW 3rd & Morrison (westbound); Portland, Oregon; USA
- Coordinates: 45°31′04″N 122°40′29″W
- Owner: TriMet
- Platforms: 2-one way side platforms
- Tracks: 1 per split
- Connections: TriMet: 15

Construction
- Cycle facilities: bike lockers
- Accessible: yes

History
- Opened: September 5, 1986

Services
| Preceding station | TriMet | Following station |
|---|---|---|
SW 3rd Avenue
| Pioneer Square North toward Hatfield Government Center | Blue Line | Oak St/SW 1st Ave One-way operation |
| Pioneer Square North toward Hillsboro Airport/Fairgrounds | Red Line | Oak St/SW 1st Ave One-way operation |
Yamhill District
| Pioneer Square South One-way operation | Blue Line | Oak St/SW 1st Ave toward Cleveland Ave |
| Pioneer Square South One-way operation | Red Line | Oak St/SW 1st Ave toward Portland Airport |
Former services
| Preceding station | TriMet | Following station |
|---|---|---|
SW 3rd Avenue
| Mall/Southwest 5th Avenue (closed) toward Hatfield Government Center | Blue Line 1990–2020 | Oak St/SW 1st Ave One-way operation |
| Mall/Southwest 5th Avenue (closed) toward Hillsboro Airport/Fairgrounds | Red Line 2001–2020 | Oak St/SW 1st Ave One-way operation |
| Mall/Southwest 5th Avenue toward Galleria/SW 10th Ave | Yellow Line 2004–2009 | Oak St/SW 1st Ave One-way operation |
| Mall/Southwest 5th Avenue toward Galleria/SW 10th Ave | Portland Vintage Trolley 1991–2009 | Oak St/SW 1st Ave One-way operation |
Yamhill District
| Mall/Southwest 4th Avenue (closed) One-way operation | Blue Line 1990–2020 | Oak St/SW 1st Ave toward Cleveland Ave |
| Mall/Southwest 4th Avenue (closed) One-way operation | Red Line 2001–2020 | Oak St/SW 1st Ave toward Portland Airport |
| Mall/Southwest 4th Avenue (closed) One-way operation | Yellow Line 2004–2009 | Oak St/SW 1st Ave toward Expo Center |
| Mall/Southwest 4th Avenue (closed) One-way operation | Portland Vintage Trolley 1991–2009 | Oak St/SW 1st Ave toward Northeast 11th Avenue |
Location

The Yamhill District and Morrison/SW 3rd Ave stations are a pair of light rail stations in Portland, Oregon, United States, served by TriMet as part of MAX Light Rail. Located within the Yamhill Historic District, the stations are built into the sidewalks of Southwest Yamhill and Morrison streets between 1st and 3rd avenues. Each station comprises one side platform, and trains traveling eastbound stop at Yamhill District while trains traveling westbound stop at Morrison/SW 3rd Ave.

The two stations are among the 27 original stations of the Banfield Light Rail Project, which built the Metropolitan Area Express (MAX), Portland's first light rail line. They opened along with the inaugural service of MAX on September 5, 1986. The stations are currently served by the Blue and Red lines. The Yellow Line had served the stations from May 2004 until August 2009 when it was rerouted to the Portland Transit Mall.
