= Pioneer Place =

Mixed-use in Portland, Oregon, U.S.

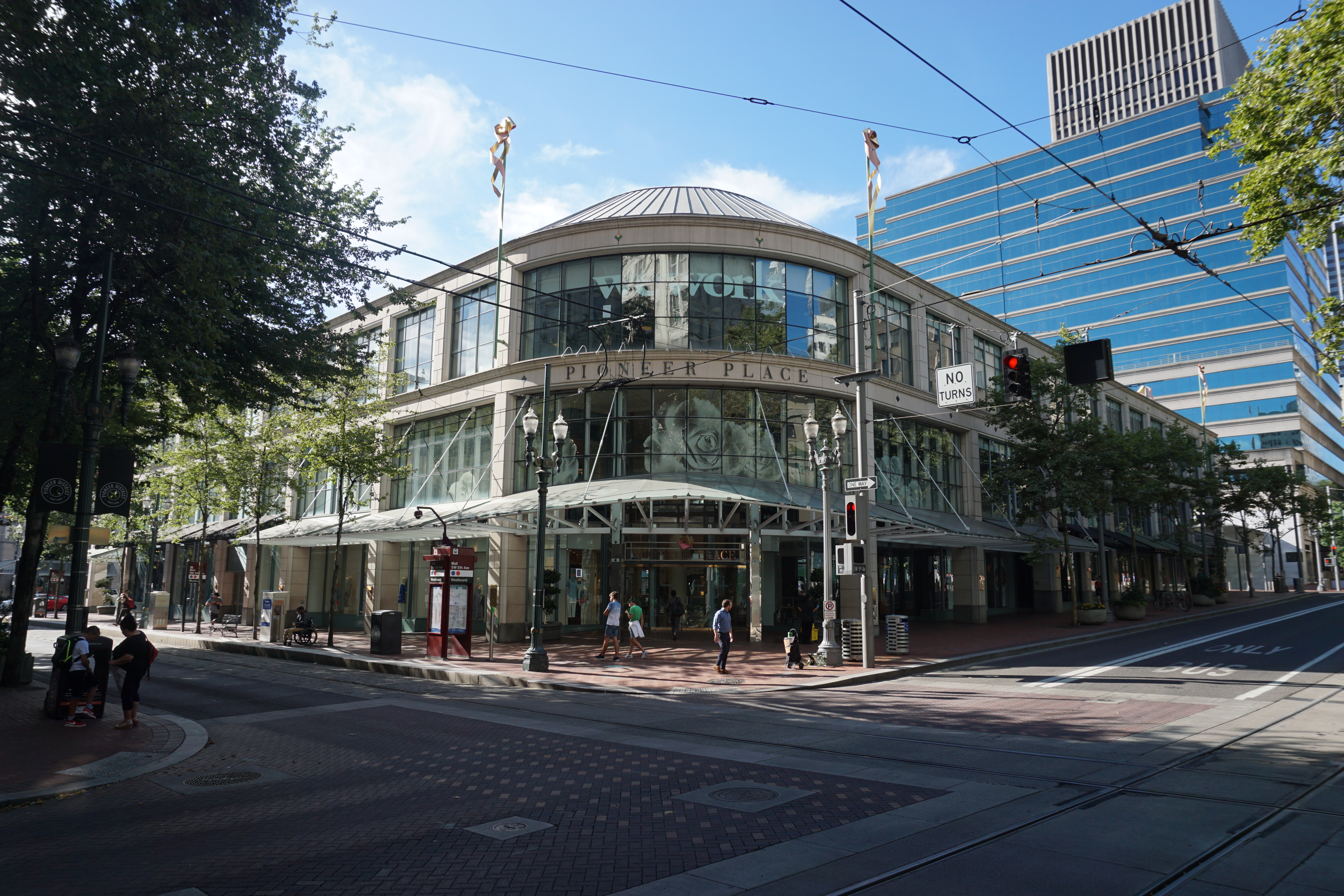
- Exterior view of Rotunda Shops in July 2017
- Location: Portland, Oregon, United States
- Coordinates: 45.5183°N 122.6773°W
- Address: 700 SW 5th Ave, 97204 (shopping mall); 888 SW 5th Ave, 97204 (Pioneer Tower)
- Opened: March 29, 1990; 36 years ago (Atrium Shops); March 29, 2000; 26 years ago (Rotunda Shops)
- Renovated: 2016–2018
- Developer: The Rouse Company
- Manager: GGP (Pioneer Place); JLL Income Property Trust (Pioneer Tower)
- Owner: GGP (Pioneer Place); JLL (Pioneer Tower)
- Architect: ELS Architecture and Urban Design
- Num. of stores: 100 (at peak; 28 remaining)
- Num. of anchor tenants: 1
- Floor area: 369,000 square feet (34,000 m^{2}) (retail); 296,000 square feet (27,500 m^{2}) (office)
- Floors: 4 (Atrium Shops) (including one basement level); 5 (Rotunda Shops) (including one basement level); 17 (Pioneer Tower)
- Parking: Parking garage with 200 paid spaces
- Public transit: Pioneer Place MAX light rail station on SW 5th Avenue and three other MAX Light Rail stations one block away at Pioneer Courthouse Square; Several bus lines on the Portland Mall
- Website: pioneerplace.com
- Building details
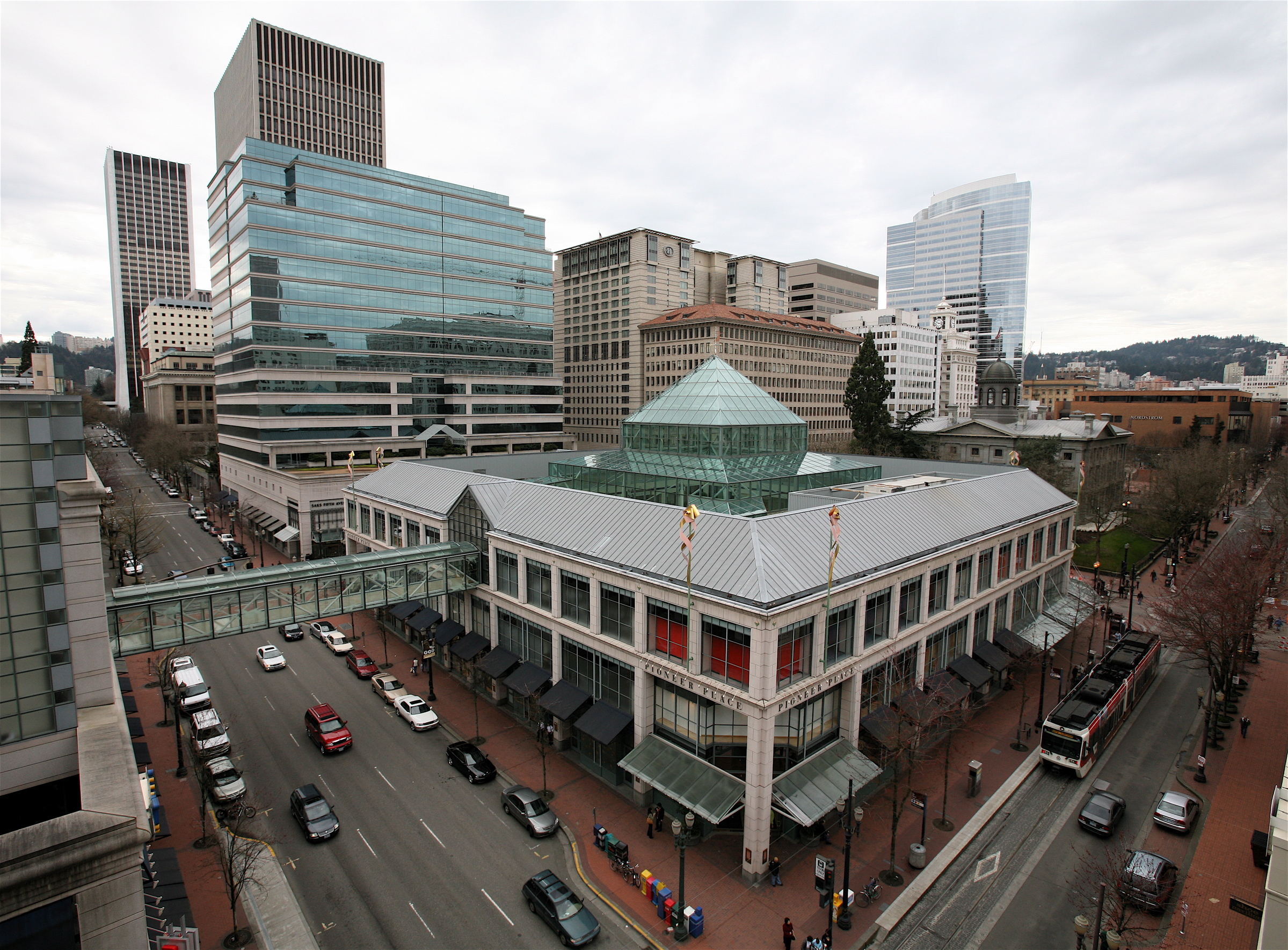
- Exterior view of Atrium Shops in March 2007

General information
- Type: Mixed-use
- Construction started: 1988; 38 years ago (Atrium Shops, Pioneer Tower); 1998; 28 years ago (Rotunda Shops)
- Completed: 1990 (Atrium Shops); 2000 (Rotunda Shops)

Design and construction
- Main contractor: Howard S. Wright Construction Company

Renovating team
- Renovating firm: General Growth Properties (2015–2018); Brookfield Properties (2018)

Pioneer Place is a mixed-use development consisting of a once-upscale, urban regional mall of the same name (composed of two retail pavilions: the Atrium Shops and the Rotunda Shops) in downtown Portland, Oregon. It consists of four blocks of retail, dining, parking, and an office building called Pioneer Tower. The mall itself is spread out between four buildings, interconnected by skywalks and underground mall sections. The footprint of the entire complex consists of four full city blocks, bisected by SW Yamhill and Fourth, bounded north–south by SW Morrison and Taylor Streets and east–west by SW Third and Fifth Avenues.

The complex was developed by the Rouse Company of Columbia, Maryland, opening in phases: Atrium Shops/Pioneer Place I in March 1990, and Rotunda Shops/Pioneer Place II exactly one decade later. Counting Rotunda Shops, Pioneer Place is one of the last enclosed malls Rouse developed, alongside Oviedo Mall in Seminole County, Florida. In 2014, Pioneer Place was the third-highest selling mall in the United States based on sales per square foot, sitting just behind Bal Harbour Shops and The Grove at Farmers Market. It is owned and managed by GGP, a subsidiary of Brookfield Properties, and the mall also contains a Regal Cinemas on the final floor of Rotunda Shops, as well as an Apple Store, branded Apple Pioneer Place.

However, having experienced decreased foot traffic, remote work trends, and safety concerns, Pioneer Place struggled as a retail center, with chains such as Forever 21 and J.Crew leaving in recent years. As of 2026, there are only 20+ stores still open. Former Lloyd Center tenants have relocated to the mall in the summer.

== Overview ==
The center has 356,154 square feet (33,087.8 m^{2}) of space, and had about 100 stores at its peak. Pioneer Place I and II contain five levels, one of which is a basement level. The top floor of Pioneer Place II houses a 6-screen Regal Cinemas movie theater. Cascades, the mall's second food court, is located underground below Pioneer Tower/Zone C, which also connects to a parking garage. That parking garage, located to the south, also contains retail space, home to Tiffany & Co. The northern lower above-ground levels of the block with Pioneer Tower housed Saks Fifth Avenue.

Pioneer Place I faces the Fifth Avenue section of the Portland Transit Mall, served by several TriMet bus routes and MAX Light Rail. It is served by all five lines of the MAX system, with its Fifth Avenue side being across the street from the Pioneer Place/5th Avenue station (southbound service), and with the Pioneer Courthouse/6th Avenue station (northbound service) and "Pioneer Square" stations (eastbound and westbound service) being only one block away. Pioneer Place II is similarly only one block away from the Third Avenue station. Since its opening in 1990, building I had been flanked by directly adjacent MAX stations on Morrison and Yamhill Streets. The two stations were closed in 2020 in order to reduce travel time for MAX riders through downtown and to the close proximity of other stations on the same MAX lines.

== History ==
=== 1970s–2000: Development and opening ===
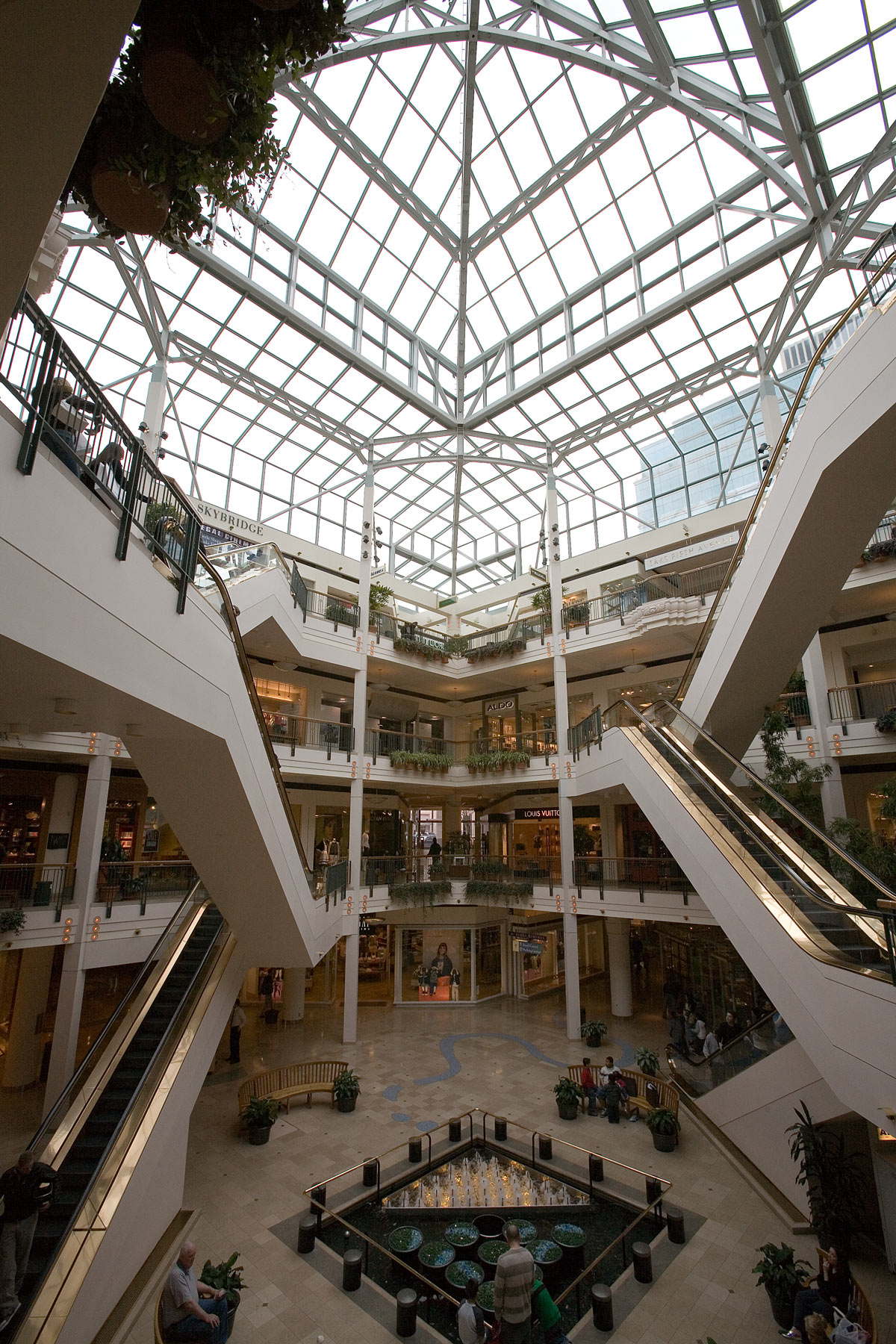
Center court of Atrium Shops in March 2007

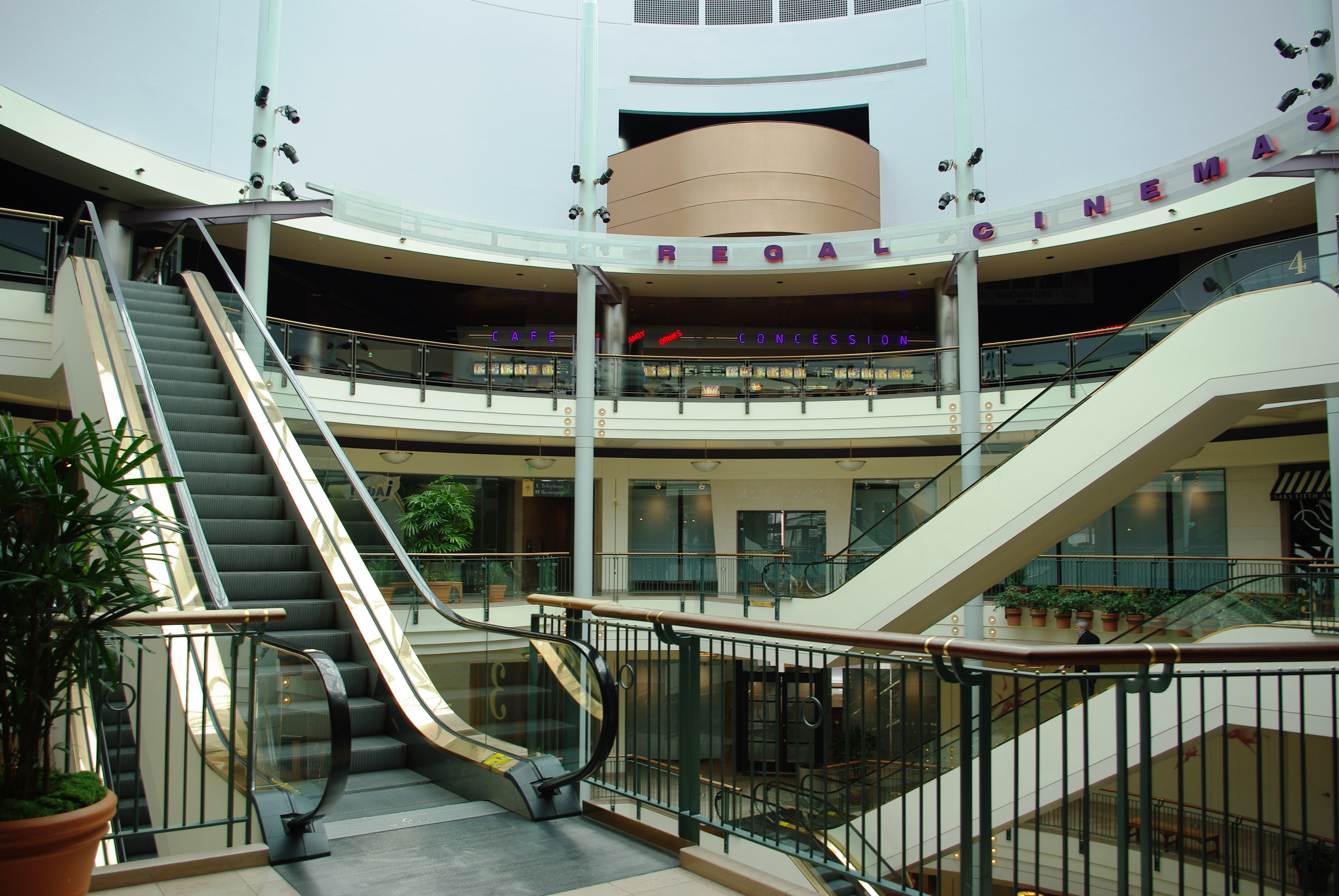
Interior view of Rotunda Shops in April 2010

In the early 1970s, the City of Portland initiated a planning process to revitalize downtown, as many have moved to the suburbs following the rise of shopping malls and decline from industrial cities. As part of these efforts, the Portland Transit Mall, alongside a light rail system, was constructed.

In July 1980, the Portland Development Commission (PDC) began plans for a mixed-use complex that included retail on a four-block site in downtown Portland (200 by 200 feet (61 by 61 m)) adjacent to the refurbished Pioneer Courthouse Square. The Request for Proposals (RFP) stated that the primary public objective of the project was the development of "major new high-quality retail facilities." The retail was to serve two vital purposes in downtown Portland: it had to link the traditional retail core at the west end of downtown with the emerging specialty and nicheoriented sector at the east end, and it needed to provide an exciting new location for national chains who would implement strong local establishments. The PDC approved the development program in 1981, and sent a request for proposals to developers based in North America, hoping for high-quality retail, offices, and parking. $32 million in tax-increment bonds supported the development of a public parking garage. Three proposals were received, and in June 1983, The Rouse Company of Columbia, Maryland was selected, and a development agreement was settled in May 1984 following negotiations. Rouse signed a deal for Frederick & Nelson and Saks Fifth Avenue to be anchor stores for the new mall.

However, development was stalled because of a major problem after the Rouse Co. was on board. Frederick & Nelson fell out of the deal in January 1986, and its departure also led to Saks Fifth to consider pulling out of the project as well. As a result of this issue, the development commission and Rouse revised the development plans, involving a phased project on three blocks with only one department store in the first phase.

Land assembly, tenant relocation, and the public parking garage structure were financed through $32 million in tax-increment bonds. Rouse invested in over $115 million for what the company announced would contain a four-story retail pavilion and an office building, akin to The Gallery at Harborplace. The deal provided between the city and Rouse involved one of two options: a land payment of $7.4 million by Rouse for the retail and of five blocks that was due ten years after the project opened, or an annual participation payment option. The city chose the second option, as well as constructing the parking garage, converting its land investment into a limited partner position in the project, thus securing a share of the project's future cash flow.

The Rouse Company established Rouse-Portland, Inc., which would develop the project, along with two legal affiliates: Pioneer Place Limited Partnership (as well as Pioneer Place Development Corporation) for the mall, and Pioneer Office Limited Partnership for the tower. Pioneer Place I finally began construction in 1988. Buildings demolished to clear the site for the mall included the Corbett Building, an office building constructed in 1907.

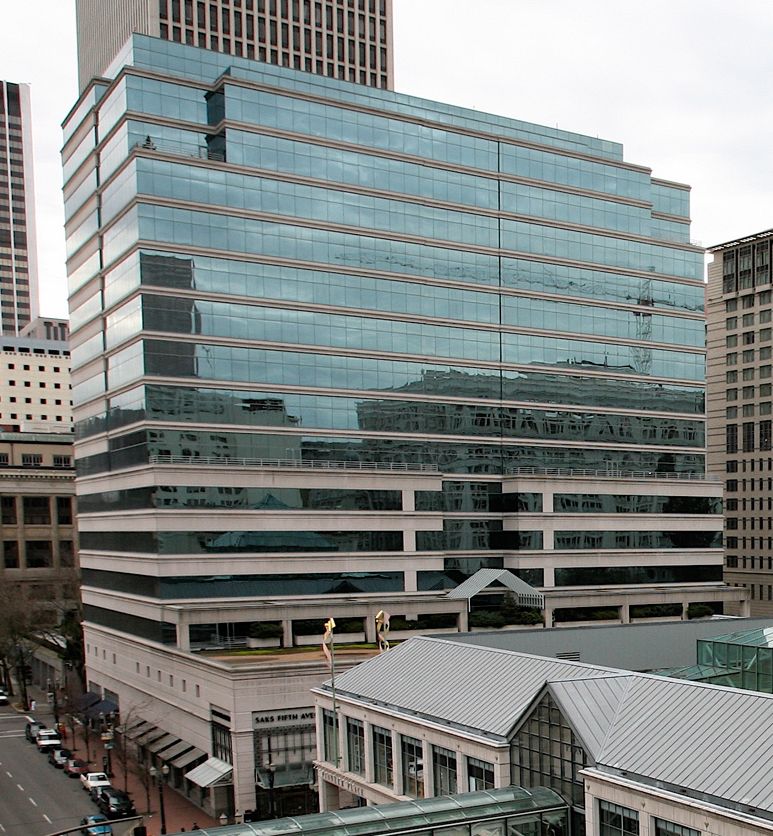
Pioneer Tower, as viewed from the north (March 2007)

The 17-story, 296,000-square-foot (27,500 m^{2}) Pioneer Tower opened first in February 1990. Pioneer Place I, or the "Atrium Shops"/Zone A, opened on March 29 of that year, and was developed with assistance from the PDC. Construction on Pioneer Place II began in 1998, and would add 150,000 square feet (14,000 m^{2}) at a cost of around $60 million. Pioneer Place II, or the "Rotunda Shops"/Zone B, is located across Fourth Avenue to the east. It opened on March 29, 2000—perfectly timed with the complex's 10th anniversary—though some tenants wouldn't finish construction until the summer of that year, such as Sundance Film Center. Rouse-Portland founded the legal affiliate Pioneer Place II Limited Partnership for this second phase, and Rotunda Shops was constructed as a five-story retail pavilion.

=== 2004–present: Decline ===
In November 2004, The Rouse Co. and its assets were acquired by General Growth Properties (GGP) of Chicago, Illinois for $12.6 billion, including Pioneer Place. Saks Fifth Avenue closed its store at the mall in 2010, with H&M taking over the portion that had been Saks men's store later that year. The remaining parts of the Saks footprint were demolished starting in August 2012 to make way for a new Apple Store and a Yard House restaurant.

In 2010, some of the empty spaces on the third floor of the Atrium Shops were temporarily subsidized for local art galleries. One of them was called Place Gallery, but it only lasted for four years. It ceased operations in April 2014 because GGP announced that its partnership with local art galleries for Pioneer Place has ended. In the summer of 2016, JLL acquired Pioneer Tower from GGP for $122 million.

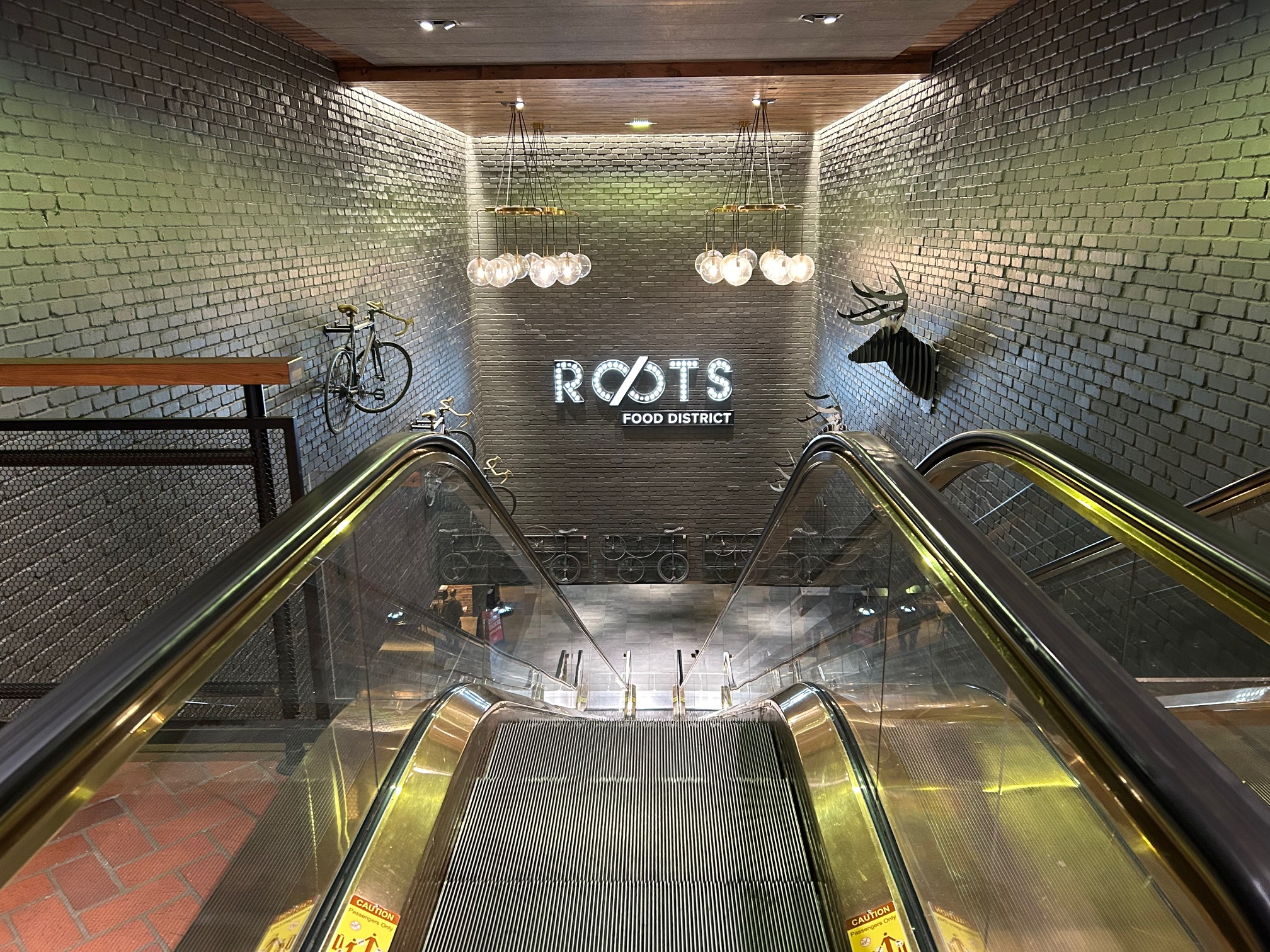
Entrance to Roots Food District (January 2025)

In 2016, Pioneer Place started its renovations, and was completed in 2018. It included the addition of the Roots Food District, and as part of those renovations, in February 2017, shared workspaces provider WeWork signed a lease to take 30,000 square feet (2,800 m^{2}) of space, one of their first leases in a mall. They took over the former art gallery spaces.

The New York-based Brookfield Properties acquired GGP and its assets in August 2018, thus giving them full ownership and management of Pioneer Place. J.Crew, a long-time tenant at the mall, closed its doors on January 22, 2023. In February 2024, Nike opened a store at Pioneer Place, but it was not permanent. The company announced that it would leave the mall when renovations on its flagship Portland store is finished. Nike vacated the mall on October 30, 2025, and its renovated store reopened on November 13.

On May 1, 2025, Forever 21 closed all of its U.S. stores, including Pioneer Place, after filing for Chapter 11 bankruptcy. Nordstrom Rack closed its store permanently on January 31, 2026, for unspecified reasons.

==== Former Lloyd Center tenants ====
Due to Lloyd Center's permanent closure date of August 8, 2026, tenants from that mall have been relocating to Pioneer Place as of July 2026. This included Brickdiculous Shop & Gallery, which would occupy the former space of Bath & Body Works and open on August 15, Floating World Comics, which would replace Made in Oregon, All American Magic Shop & Theater, which would open adjacent to the mall's Raising Cane's by mid-August, and Kathmandu To You, which would move to Pioneer Place alongside Auntie Anne's.

== See also ==
- List of shopping malls in Oregon
- Westlake Center, National Place, and Arizona Center, all of which also developed by Rouse
