= Pioneer Square stations (TriMet) =

Pair of light rail stations in Portland, Oregon

Pioneer Square South Pioneer Square North
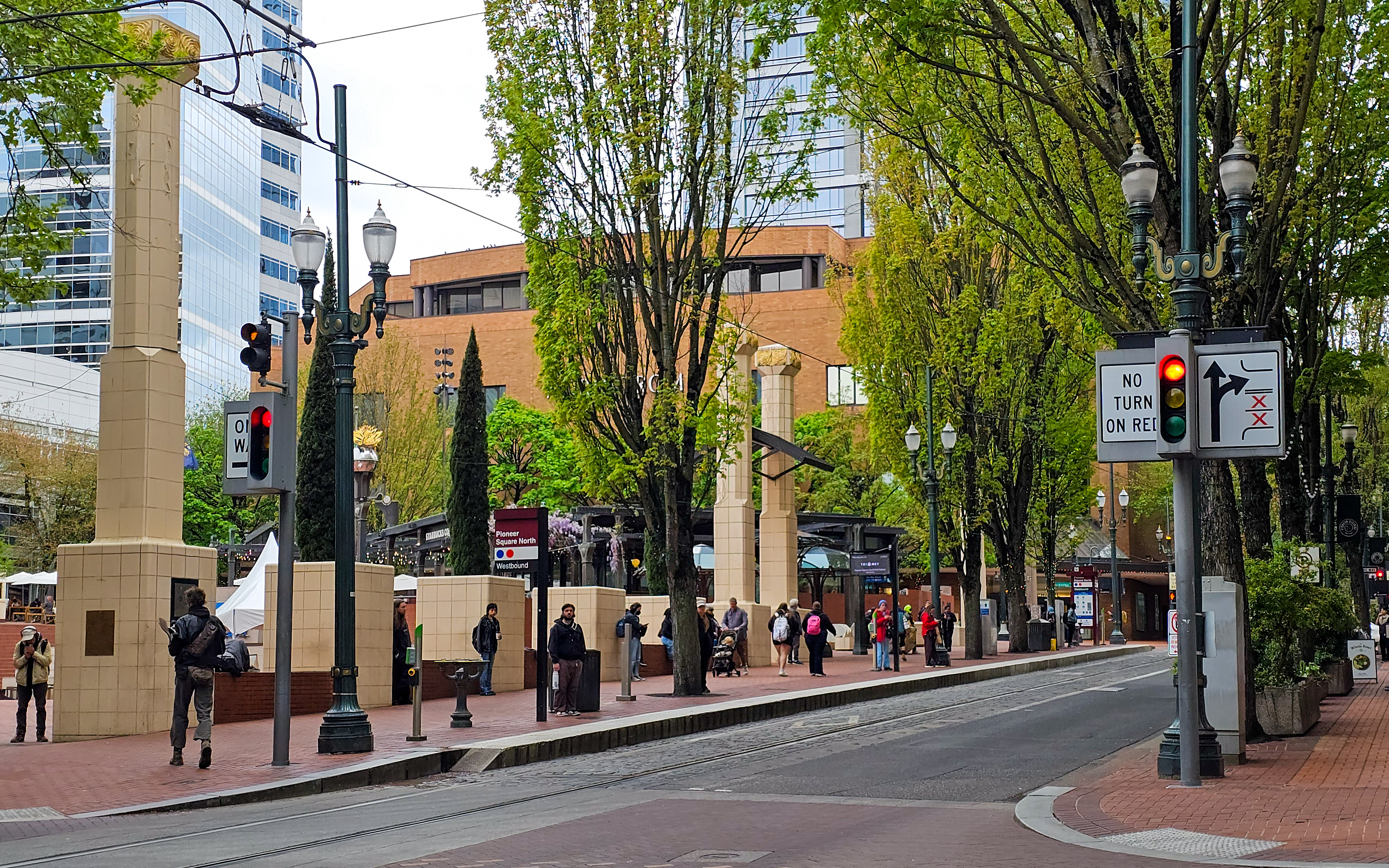
- The westbound platform of Pioneer Square North station in 2026

General information
- Location: Pioneer Courthouse Square; Portland, Oregon, U.S.
- Coordinates: 45°31′08″N 122°40′46″W
- Owner: TriMet
- Platforms: 2 one-way side platforms
- Tracks: 2 (1 per split)
- Connections: MAX Orange, Yellow lines (at Pioneer Courthouse and Pioneer Place); C-Tran, TriMet bus (Portland Transit Mall)

Construction
- Accessible: yes

History
- Opened: September 5, 1986

Passengers
- Fall 2019: 1,796 (Pioneer Square South); 3,327 (Pioneer Square North); 5,123 (total) weekday boardings

Services
Preceding station	TriMet	Following station
Pioneer Square North
Galleria/SW 10th Ave toward Hatfield Government Center	Blue Line	Morrison/SW 3rd Ave One-way operation
Galleria/SW 10th Ave toward Hillsboro Airport/Fairgrounds	Red Line	Morrison/SW 3rd Ave One-way operation
Pioneer Square South
Library/SW 9th Ave One-way operation	Blue Line	Yamhill District toward Cleveland Ave
Library/SW 9th Ave One-way operation	Red Line	Yamhill District toward Portland Airport
Former services
Preceding station	TriMet	Following station
Pioneer Square North
Galleria/SW 10th Ave toward Hatfield Government Center	Blue Line 1986–2020	Mall/Southwest 5th Avenue (closed) One-way operation
Galleria/SW 10th Ave toward Hillsboro Airport/Fairgrounds	Red Line 2001–2020	Mall/Southwest 5th Avenue (closed) One-way operation
Galleria/SW 10th Ave Terminus	Yellow Line 2004–2009	Mall/Southwest 5th Avenue (closed) One-way operation
Galleria/SW 10th Ave Terminus	Portland Vintage Trolley 1991–2009	Mall/Southwest 5th Avenue (closed) One-way operation
Pioneer Square South
Library/SW 9th Ave One-way operation	Blue Line 1986–2020	Mall/Southwest 4th Avenue (closed) toward Cleveland Ave
Library/SW 9th Ave One-way operation	Red Line 2001–2020	Mall/Southwest 4th Avenue (closed) toward Portland Airport
Library/SW 9th Ave One-way operation	Yellow Line 2004–2009	Mall/Southwest 4th Avenue (closed) toward Expo Center
Library/SW 9th Ave One-way operation	Portland Vintage Trolley 1991–2009 1986–2020	Mall/Southwest 4th Avenue (closed) toward Northeast 11th Avenue
Location

The Pioneer Square South and Pioneer Square North stations are a pair of light rail stations in Portland, Oregon, United States, served by TriMet as part of MAX Light Rail. Located at Pioneer Courthouse Square in downtown Portland, the side-platform stations are integrated into the sidewalks along Southwest Yamhill and Morrison streets between Broadway and 6th Avenue. Eastbound trains stop at Pioneer Square South, while westbound trains stop at Pioneer Square North.

The Pioneer Square stations are among the 27 original stops of the Banfield Light Rail Project, Portland's first light rail line. They opened with the system’s inaugural service on September 5, 1986. The stations are served by the Blue Line, which operates between Hatfield Government Center station in Hillsboro and Cleveland Avenue station in Gresham, and the Red Line, which operates between Hillsboro Airport/Fairgrounds station and Portland Airport station. The Yellow Line had served the stations from May 2004 until August 2009 when the line was rerouted to the Portland Transit Mall.

== Location ==
The Pioneer Square stations occupy the sidewalk facing Southwest Yamhill and Morrison streets between Broadway and 6th Avenue at Pioneer Courthouse Square in downtown Portland. The square, commonly referred to as "Portland's Living Room", is situated on a 40,006-square-foot (3,716.7 m^{2}) city block in the center of downtown. It features several pieces of artwork, including the Waterfall Fountain, a water feature built of granite, and the Weather Machine and Allow Me sculptures. Oregon's first Starbucks outlet sits on the northwest corner of the square, while a news television studio for KGW called "Studio on the Square" occupies the southeast corner. Neighboring office towers include the American Bank Building to the north and the Jackson Tower and 6Y building to the south. Nordstrom occupies the block to the west.

== History ==
The downtown city block bound by Morrison and Yamhill streets to the north and south and 6th Avenue and Broadway to the east and west had been occupied by various structures, including Portland's first public school, the Portland Hotel, and a two-story parking garage. In 1969, block owner Meier & Frank requested a permit to construct an 800-car parking garage at the site, which the Portland City Council rejected following a series of heated public hearings. The controversial proposal led the city and local businesses to pursue a comprehensive downtown plan that envisioned turning the site into a public space instead. After negotiating with Meier & Frank, the city purchased the property and in 1980, announced a national design competition for a plaza that would be called "Pioneer Courthouse Square".

Portland's first light rail line, which planners referred to as the Banfield Light Rail Project, received federal approval for construction in September 1980. Just over a year later, TriMet published a conceptual design report of the project that outlined a 27-station, 15.1-mile (24.3 km) line and included a pair of light rail stations at Pioneer Courthouse Square. The plans called for a pair of platforms along the north and south ends of the square on Morrison and Yamhill streets.

Construction of the line commenced in April 1983 in Gresham and largely progressed from east to west, with the downtown segment among the final sections to be completed. Street and sidewalk reconstruction work finally reached downtown in March the following year. While work continued on the line, the city finished building the square and dedicated it on April 6, 1984. By March 1986, major light rail construction work had ceased. Line testing in downtown began with the arrival of the first light rail car two months later.

On September 5, 1986, the light rail line, which TriMet officially named the Metropolitan Area Express (MAX), opened to the public. A three-day celebration took place across the route, including at Pioneer Courthouse Square, which hosted an opening ceremony and several concerts. Over 3,000 people gathered at the square to welcome the 11:45 am arrival of the first train from Gresham.

Until 1998, MAX only ran from 11th Avenue in downtown Portland to Cleveland Avenue in central Gresham, with a stop at the Pioneer Square stations. In September 1998, TriMet extended MAX service farther west to Hatfield Government Center in downtown Hillsboro in Washington County with the opening of the Westside MAX extension. Three years later, the Red Line became the second line to serve the Pioneer Square stations following the opening of the Airport MAX extension, which introduced an airport rail link between downtown Portland and Portland International Airport. The original service between Hillsboro and Gresham was subsequently renamed the Blue Line. In September 2003, TriMet extended the Red Line westward to Beaverton Transit Center. From 2004 to 2009, the Yellow Line, which runs to the Expo Center in North Portland, also stopped at these stations until TriMet rerouted it to the light rail tracks on Portland Transit Mall in August 2009.

== Station details ==
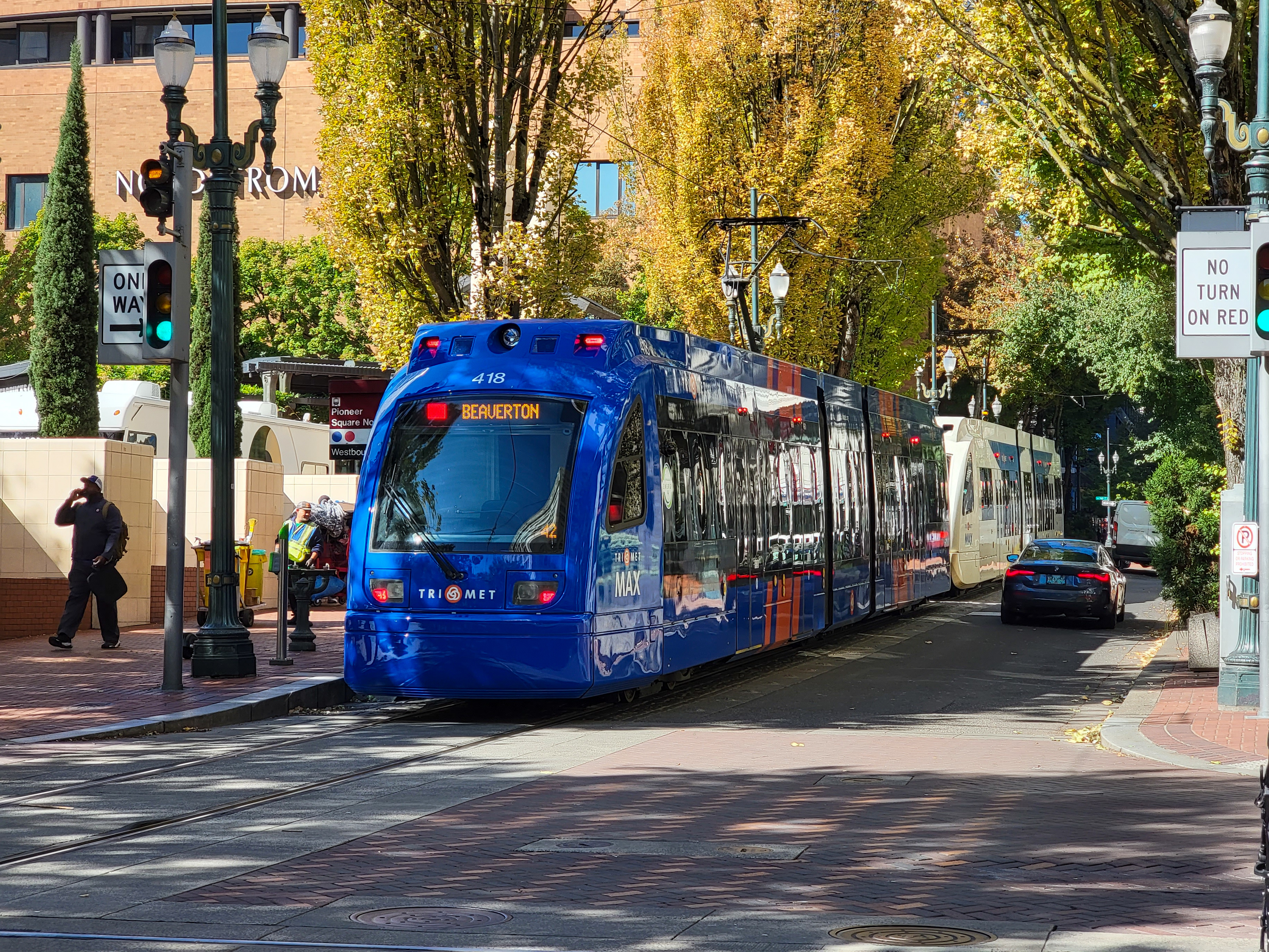
A Red Line train stopped at Pioneer Square North station in 2023

Each station comprises one side platform as MAX operates in a one-way pair along the Yamhill–Morrison segment. Pioneer Courthouse Square is situated between the two platforms. Amenities include ticket vending machines, garbage cans, shelters, and schedule information displays. TriMet's ticket office is located inside the visitor information center on the west side of the square between the Waterfall Fountain. Fares may be purchased at the ticket office or from ticket vending machines on the platforms.

=== Service ===
The Pioneer Square stations are served by two MAX lines: the Blue Line, which operates from Hatfield Government Center station in Hillsboro in the west to Cleveland Avenue station in Gresham in the east, and the MAX Red Line, which operates from Hillsboro Airport/Fairgrounds station in the west to Portland Airport station in the east. From the stations, westbound trains take approximately 25 minutes to reach Beaverton Transit Center and 50 minutes to reach Hatfield Government Center station. Eastbound trains take approximately 35 minutes to reach Portland International Airport station and 50 minutes to reach Cleveland Avenue station. The stations together recorded an average 5,123 riders on weekdays in fall 2019.

TriMet considers the Pioneer Courthouse Square vicinity a transit hub. It is the only point in the MAX system where all five existing light rail services interconnect. The northbound light rail tracks on the Portland Transit Mall run along the immediate east side of the Pioneer Square station platforms on 6th Avenue; this provides a transfer to the MAX platform of Pioneer Courthouse/Southwest 6th station across the street, served by the Yellow Line. On the opposite end of this adjacent block, which is occupied by the Pioneer Courthouse, is the southbound MAX station, Pioneer Place/Southwest 5th; this station is served by the Orange Line.

The Pioneer Square stations also facilitate transfers to TriMet and C-Tran buses serving the Portland Transit Mall, including a future connection to FX–Division via stops 5th and Salmon and 6th and Taylor.
