= Pioneer Square =

Pioneer Square may refer to:

- Pioneer Courthouse Square, a town square in Portland, Oregon, United States
- Pioneer Square, Seattle, a neighborhood in Seattle, Washington, United States

== See also ==
- Pioneer Square station (Sound Transit), a light rail station in Seattle, Washington, United States
- Pioneer Square stations (TriMet), a pair of light rail stations in Portland, Oregon, United States
