= Corbett Building =

Former building in Portland, Oregon, U.S.

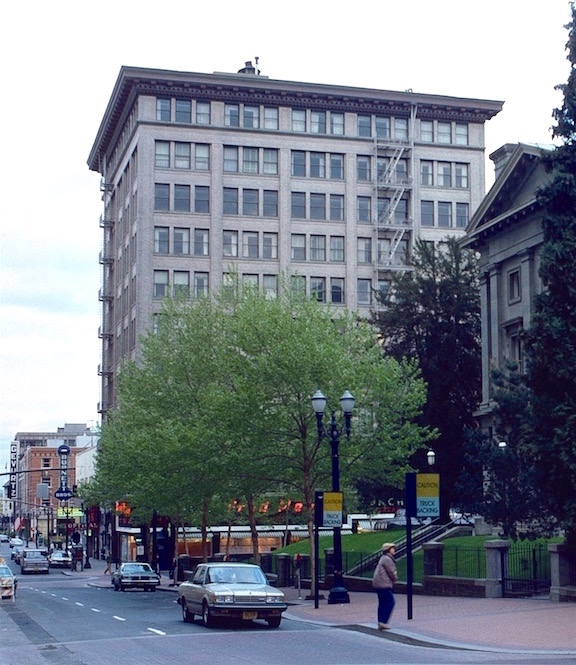
- The building's exterior in 1984
- Interactive map of the Corbett Building area

General information
- Location: Portland, Oregon, United States
- Coordinates: 45.5183°N 122.6773°W
- Opened: 1907
- Demolished: May 1, 1988

The Corbett Building was located at Southwest 5th and Morrison in downtown Portland, Oregon. Designed by Whidden & Lewis and built in 1907, the structure was demolished in 1988 to make way for the Pioneer Place shopping mall.
