= Library/SW 9th Ave and Galleria/SW 10th Ave stations =

Light rail stations in Portland, Oregon, U.S.

Library/SW 9th Ave Galleria/SW 10th Ave
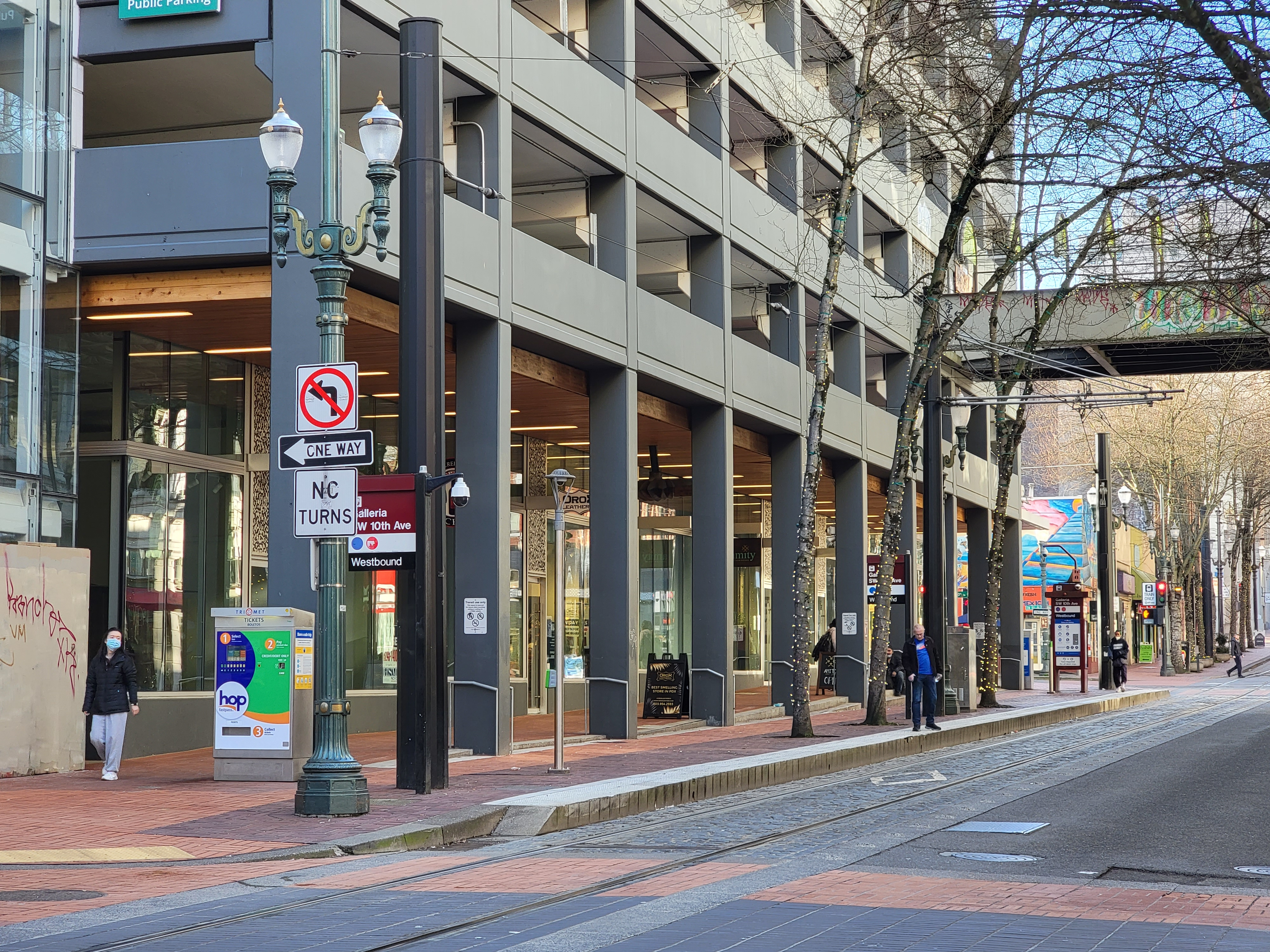

General information
- Location: SW 9th & Yamhill (eastbound); SW 10th & Morrison (westbound); Portland, Oregon; USA
- Coordinates: 45°31′11″N 122°40′58″W
- Owner: TriMet
- Platforms: 2 one-way Side platforms
- Tracks: 1 per split
- Connections: Portland Streetcar: A and B Loop, NS Line; TriMet: 15, 63

Construction
- Accessible: yes

History
- Opened: September 5, 1986

Services
Preceding station	TriMet	Following station
Galleria/SW 10th Avenue
Providence Park toward Hatfield Government Center	Blue Line	Pioneer Square North One-way operation
Providence Park toward Hillsboro Airport/Fairgrounds	Red Line	Pioneer Square North One-way operation
Library/SW 9th Avenue
Providence Park One-way operation	Blue Line	Pioneer Square South toward Cleveland Ave
Providence Park One-way operation	Red Line	Pioneer Square South toward Portland Airport
Services at nearby streetcar stop
Preceding station	Portland Streetcar	Following station
Central Library
Art Museum; One-way operation	NS Line	Southwest 10th & Alder towards South Lowell & Bond
Art Museum; One-way operation	A Loop	Southwest 10th & Alder; Next clockwise
Southwest 11th & Taylor
Southwest 11th & Jefferson towards NW 23rd & Marshall	NS Line	Southwest 11th & Alder; One-way operation
Southwest 11th & Jefferson; Next counter-clockwise	B Loop	Southwest 11th & Alder; One-way operation
Former services
Preceding station	TriMet	Following station
Galleria/SW 10th Avenue
Terminus	Yellow Line 2004–2009	Pioneer Square North One-way operation
Terminus	Portland Vintage Trolley 1991-2009	Pioneer Square North One-way operation
Library/SW 9th Avenue
Terminus	Yellow Line 2004–2009	Pioneer Square South toward Expo Center
Terminus	Portland Vintage Trolley 1991-2009	Pioneer Square South toward Northeast 11th Avenue
Preceding station	Portland Streetcar	Following station
Central Library
Art Museum; One-way operation	Portland Vintage Trolley; 2001-2005	Southwest 10th & Alder; Next clockwise
Southwest 11th & Taylor
Southwest 11th & Jefferson; Next clockwise	Portland Vintage Trolley; 2001-2005	Southwest 11th & Alder; One-way operation
Location

Library/Southwest 9th Avenue and Galleria/Southwest 10th Avenue are light rail stops on the MAX Blue and Red Lines in Portland, Oregon. It was the original western terminus and is now the Eastside MAX line's first stop eastbound/last stop westbound in downtown.

The Library/Southwest 9th Avenue stop is located on Yamhill Street and is used by eastbound trains, while the Galleria/Southwest 10th Avenue is on Morrison Street and is used by westbound trains. Both platforms are built into the street's sidewalk, and a parking garage with ground-floor retail sits between them.

For a little more than five years, this station was also served by the Yellow Line, from that line's opening in May 2004 until its relocation to the Portland Transit Mall in August 2009.

== 11th Avenue loop tracks ==
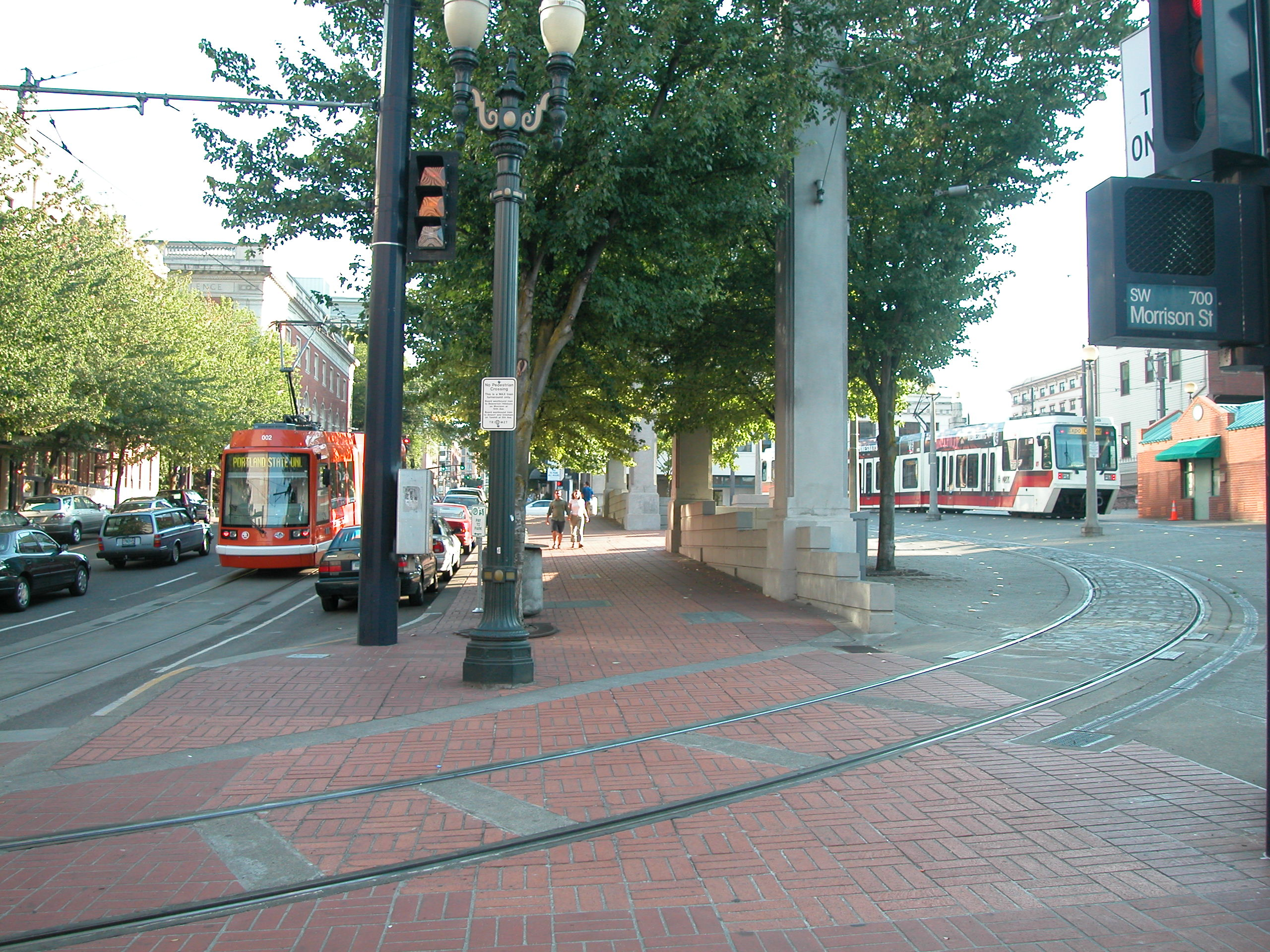
A partial view of the SW 11th Ave turnaround loop, showing one of the three tracks in the loop and a Portland Streetcar passing by on 11th Avenue

The three 11th Avenue loop tracks, located one block west of these two stations, allow westbound trains terminating in downtown Portland access to Yamhill Street from Morrison Street. Previous to the opening of the Westside section of what is now the Blue Line, all trains used this facility to turn around. Red Line trains used them from that line's opening in 2001 until it was extended to Beaverton Transit Center in 2003. Then, Portland Vintage Trolley still used it on Sundays, and starting in 2004 Yellow Line trains used the loops every day until the Yellow Line and Vintage Trolley both moved to the Portland Transit Mall. Presently, there is no regularly scheduled use of the turnaround loop here, but it is often used to store trains temporarily for use after events, such as a game at nearby Providence Park.

When TriMet began using colors to designate rail lines (2001), this was considered the western terminus for what is now the Blue Line, until it was expanded westward to Hillsboro in 1998; this was also the case for the Red Line when it opened in 2001 until it was extended west to Beaverton Transit Center in 2003. It was then used as the western terminus for the Yellow Line until it moved to the Portland Transit Mall in 2009.

Due to safety concerns, passengers are not allowed on trains passing through the loop and must disembark at the Galleria platform. The yard takes up about half a Portland city block, and includes a small maintenance pit and an operator break room. It is also used to store trains for special events. This is similar to the Vintage Trolley junction at Lloyd Center/NE 11th Ave MAX Station, which is now used to store extra light rail cars for events at Rose Quarter Transit Center since the Vintage Trolley is no longer in service.

== Points of interest nearby ==
The Multnomah County Central Library is on the corner opposite the Library/9th platform. The westbound station's namesake, The Galleria, a former shopping center, now hosts the Le Cordon Bleu College of Culinary Arts. It is located across Morrison Street from the Galleria/10th platform. This section of Portland is known as the "West End", containing the Portland Park Blocks, museums, and historic hotels.

== Portland Streetcar connection ==
The Portland Streetcar system stops close to this MAX station, on 10th Avenue and 11th Avenue. The stops on 10th Avenue allow transfers to streetcars northbound on the NS Line to the Pearl District and Northwest Portland, and on the A Loop to the Pearl District, the Lloyd District, the Oregon Convention Center, and other points on the city's east side. The stops on 11th Avenue allow transfers to streetcars southbound on the NS Line to Portland State University and South Waterfront, and on the B Loop to South Waterfront, the Oregon Museum of Science and Industry and the east side. Northbound stops, on 10th Avenue, are at Central Library (across Yamhill Street from the MAX platform) and at Alder (one block north of the MAX platform on Morrison). Southbound stops, on 11th Avenue, are at Alder and Taylor Streets (the latter behind the Central Library).

MAX trains passing through the light rail/Portland Streetcar junction have priority over streetcar traffic, though both generally move with the traffic flow. In addition, there is also a switch to bring streetcars onto the MAX line. On a rainy day, one can see sparks when either type of train pantograph hits the electrical wire junction.
