= Hillsboro Airport/Fairgrounds station =

Light rail station in Oregon, US

Hillsboro Airport/Fairgrounds
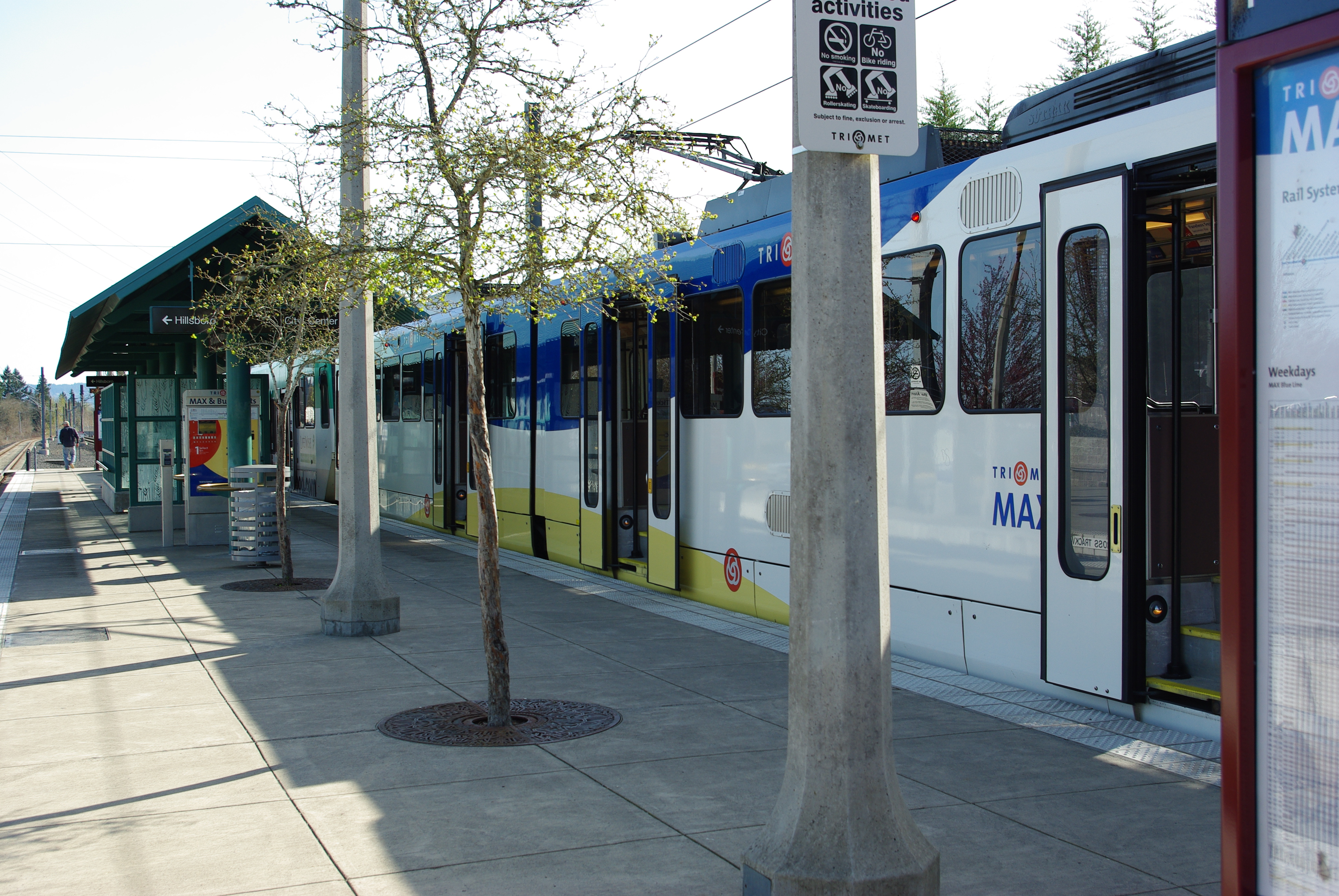

General information
- Location: 601 Northeast 34th Avenue; Hillsboro, Oregon; USA
- Coordinates: 45°31′37″N 122°56′46″W
- Owner: TriMet
- Platforms: 1 island platform, 1 side platform
- Tracks: 2
- Connections: TriMet: 46

Construction
- Parking: 396 park and ride spaces
- Accessible: yes

History
- Opened: September 12, 1998
- Former names: Fair Complex/Hillsboro Airport station

Services
Preceding station	TriMet	Following station
Washington/SE 12th Ave toward Hatfield Government Center	Blue Line	Hawthorn Farm toward Cleveland Ave
Terminus	Red Line	Hawthorn Farm toward Portland Airport
Location

Hillsboro Airport/Fairgrounds, formerly Fair Complex/Hillsboro Airport, is a light rail station on the MAX Blue and Red lines in Hillsboro, Oregon, United States. It is the 16th stop westbound on the Westside MAX, and the last westbound stop prior to crossing the Main Street Bridge. The station is located close to the Westside Commons – the 2019-adopted new name for the Washington County Fair Complex – and Hillsboro Airport, a major general-aviation facility in Hillsboro, and the location of the Oregon International Airshow in the summer. Bus line 46-North Hillsboro serves the station.

== History ==
Construction of TriMet’s Westside MAX project began in 1994, with the Fairplex station opening on September 12, 1998, along with the rest of the line west of Downtown Portland. A person was struck and killed by a MAX train at the station in April 2001. In June 2004, the station was the site of a failed armed robbery where the robber's gun failed to fire. In 2007, plans for redesigning the county fairgrounds were announced and included a proposal to create a large exhibition hall that would connect to the MAX station via a public plaza. In March 2011, TriMet received a federal grant to pay for the installation of security cameras at the station. TriMet announced the station would be renamed to "Hillsboro Airport/Fairgrounds" on August 25, 2024, concurrent with the extension of Red Line service to the station on that date (with an inauguration ceremony three days later, on August 28).

== Amenities ==
Located south of northeast Cornell Road on northeast 34th Avenue, the station is adjacent to the Washington County Fair Complex – renamed Westside Commons in 2019 – and directly south of the Hillsboro Airport. Passengers can travel west to downtown Hillsboro or east to Portland and Gresham from the stop. The station has a park-and-ride lot and bus connections to the number 46 line. Designed by architectural firm OTAK Inc., the station features an island platform and a side platform along the two tracks, with a third track to the west used for parking extra trains utilized for increased capacity during special events such as the county fair and the Oregon International Airshow. The station also includes bike lockers and bike racks, is compliant with the Americans with Disabilities Act, and has a seasonal concessions stand.

Across the street from the station's parking lot, a new 89,000-square-foot (8,300 m^{2}) conference center and exhibition hall, known as the Wingspan Event & Conference Center, opened in August 2020, replacing buildings demolished in 2018.

=== Artwork ===
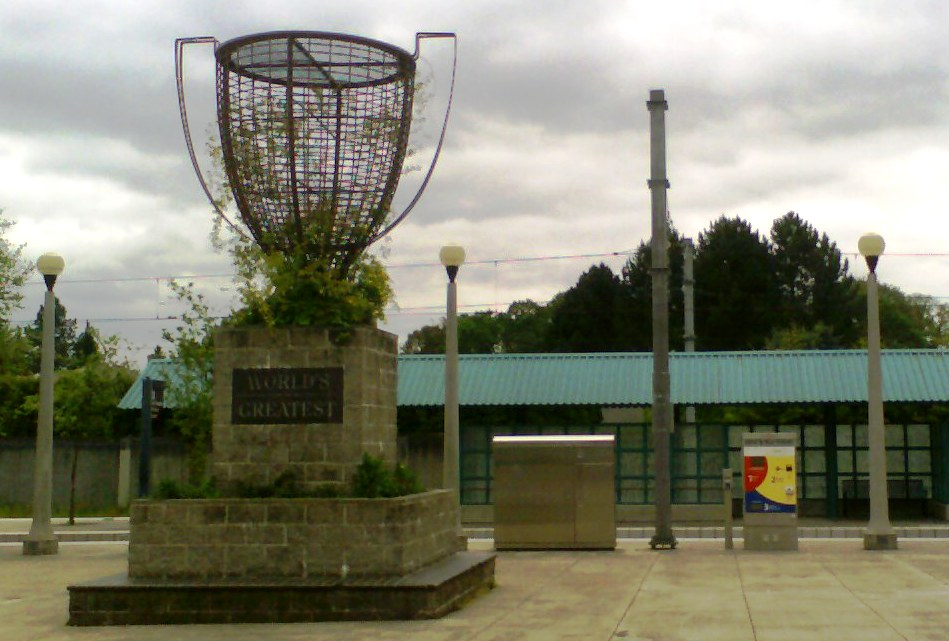
"World's Greatest" in the foreground and the station shelter behind

As with all stations along the Westside MAX line, the Fairgrounds station includes public artwork, with the theme of pride in achievement for this stop. One item is a weather vane featuring five model airplanes designed by Glen Geller and Curt Oliver. These planes have a wingspan of approximately 2 feet (61 cm), are based on real historic aircraft, and include a Longster III, a dirigible named Gelatine, the George Yates Geodetic, a Curtiss Pusher, and Van's Aircraft RV-3. An additional piece of art at the station is a large metal sculpture of a trophy designed by Bill Will. Entitled "World's Greatest", the wire cup is a topiary covered in ivy sitting atop a cement block base. Additionally, historic photographs featuring the county fair are etched into the glass of the windscreen, while tree rooms create shade.
