= Portland Airport station =

Light rail station in Portland, Oregon, United States

Portland Airport
- The station's platform in 2024, facing west

General information
- Other names: Airport; Portland International Airport (Note: "Portland Airport" is the name displayed on station signage and on the TriMet Rail System map following the station's 2023 reconstruction. Prior to reconstruction, the station was called "Airport" on station signage as well as on previous TriMet maps. TriMet also refers to the station as "Portland International Airport" in other mediums.)
- Location: 7000 NE Airport Way; Portland, Oregon, U.S.
- Coordinates: 45°35′15″N 122°35′35″W
- Owner: TriMet
- Platforms: 1 island platform
- Tracks: 2

Construction
- Structure type: At-grade
- Parking: Paid parking nearby
- Accessible: Yes

History
- Opened: September 10, 2001

Passengers
- Spring 2023: 1,705 weekday boardings

Services
Preceding station	TriMet	Following station
Mt Hood Ave toward Hillsboro Airport/Fairgrounds	Red Line	Terminus
Location

Portland Airport station is a light rail station in Portland, Oregon, United States, serving Portland International Airport. Part of TriMet's MAX Light Rail system, it is the eastern terminus of the Red Line, which connects the airport with Portland, Beaverton, and Hillsboro. The platform is located on the ground floor of the main passenger terminal near the southern end of the arrivals hall and baggage claim area.

Portland Airport station was built as part of the Airport MAX project, a 5.5-mile (8.9 km) branch line extending from the Eastside MAX at Gateway Transit Center. Construction of the station began in July 2000, and it opened on September 10, 2001. Trains serve the station for 22 hours per day with headways of 15 minutes during most of the day. The station recorded an average of 1,705 weekday boardings in spring 2023.

== History ==
Before the light rail station was built, Portland's regional transit agency, TriMet, had been serving Portland International Airport with buses since 1970. In 1986, TriMet began operating the Metropolitan Area Express (MAX) between Portland and Gresham, along what is now known as the Eastside MAX, and the Portland metropolitan area's regional government, Metro, proposed a light rail extension to the airport. Early plans envisioned a line running from Clackamas to the airport via Interstate 205 (I-205) using rights-of-way provided by the I-205 busway, which was originally built to accommodate a bus rapid transit line that never materialized.

In 1991, the Port of Portland adopted a multi-phased, $300 million airport master plan to address expected growth through 2010. The plan would upgrade the main passenger terminal with space for a future light rail station outside the terminal's arrivals hall. By 1994, travelers using the airport had risen by 34 percent, far exceeding the Port's projections. Struggling to meet demand, Port officials moved to accelerate airport light rail plans, which regional planners did not anticipate pursuing until the late 2000s. TriMet had also wanted to prioritize completing the Westside MAX and South/North Corridor projects before extending MAX to the airport.

In 1996, engineering firm Bechtel approached the Port with an unsolicited proposal to build the airport line. After negotiations between Bechtel, the Port, and local jurisdictions, Bechtel was granted the design–build contract for the light rail extension in exchange for development rights to the 120-acre (48.6 ha) Portland International Center, the largest commercially zoned property in Portland at the time. Bechtel later developed this property and renamed it Cascade Station. The Port projected the airport terminal station to cost $8.4 million and allocated a $3 ticket fee to fund its construction. Delta Air Lines, Reno Air, and United Airlines protested the use of ticket fees but the Federal Aviation Administration authorized it in May 1999. Construction of the Airport MAX extension commenced the following month. Hoffman Construction began building the station's platform in July 2000 and by August, Stacy Witbeck had started to lay the 3,000 ft (914.4 m) of rail along the segment closest to the terminal.

On September 10, 2001, the station opened along with the entire Airport MAX extension that introduced Red Line service between downtown Portland and the airport. Celebrations planned for the following weekend were canceled following the September 11 attacks, and the airport was closed for three days. Planners projected single-car trains to initially serve Portland International Airport station but TriMet deployed two-car consists on the line after recording 3,800 riders over Thanksgiving weekend in November 2001. In September 2003, TriMet extended Red Line service farther west using the existing Westside MAX tracks to Beaverton Transit Center. This was done in an effort to provide a one-seat ride to the airport for westside riders. In 2006, the station handled more than one million passengers in a single year for the first time.

TriMet had reintroduced bus service to the airport with the 272–PDX Night Bus route on September 2, 2018. The bus route ran in the late night and early morning hours when the Red Line was not operating. It was indefinitely suspended on April 5, 2020, amid the COVID-19 pandemic.

=== 2023 reconstruction ===
On June 18, 2023, TriMet temporarily ceased MAX Red Line service from Portland Airport station to Gateway Transit Center to make way for reconstruction. The newly renovated Portland Airport station opened on October 22, 2023.

== Station details ==
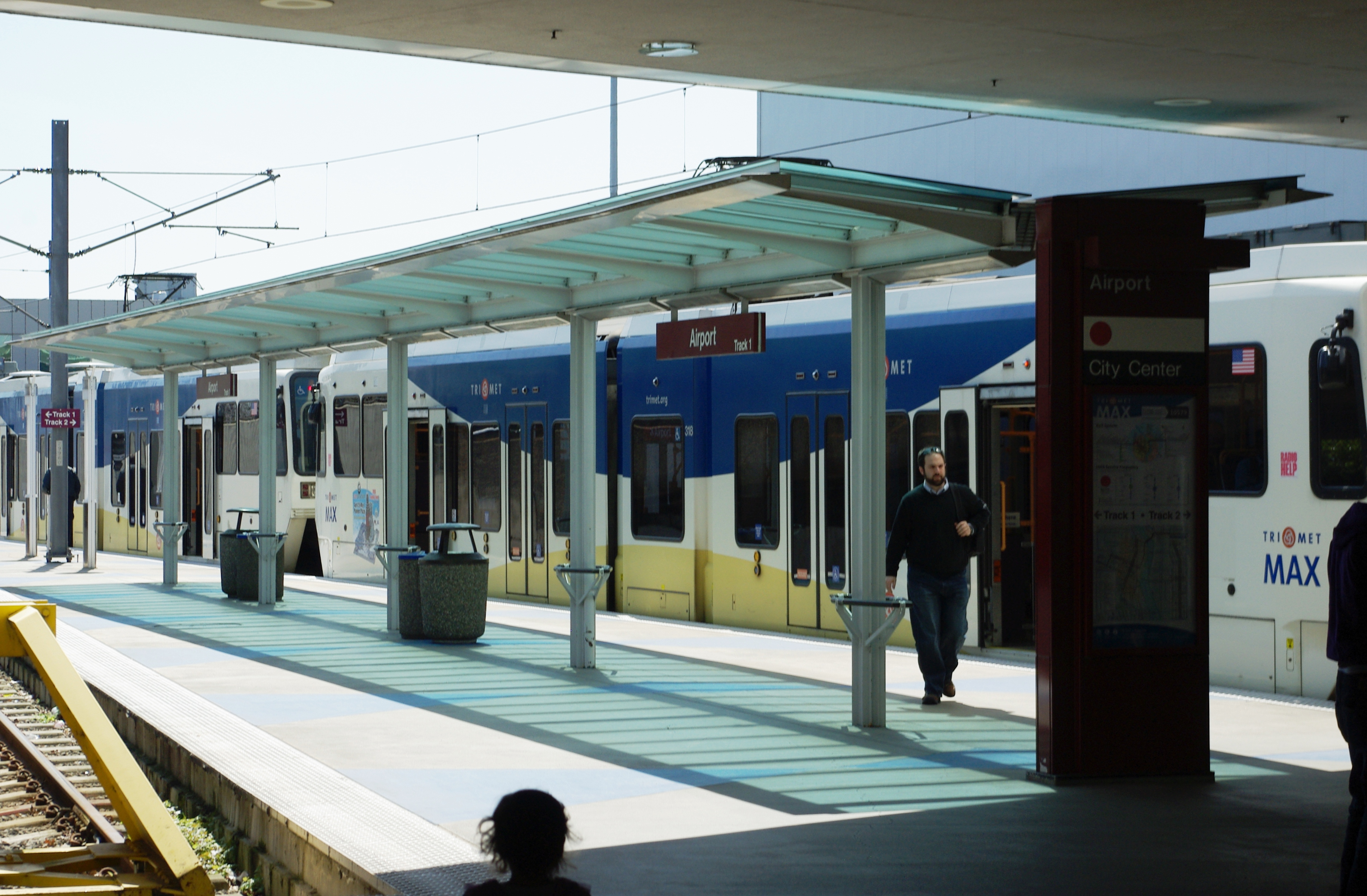
The station platform in 2011, prior to reconstruction

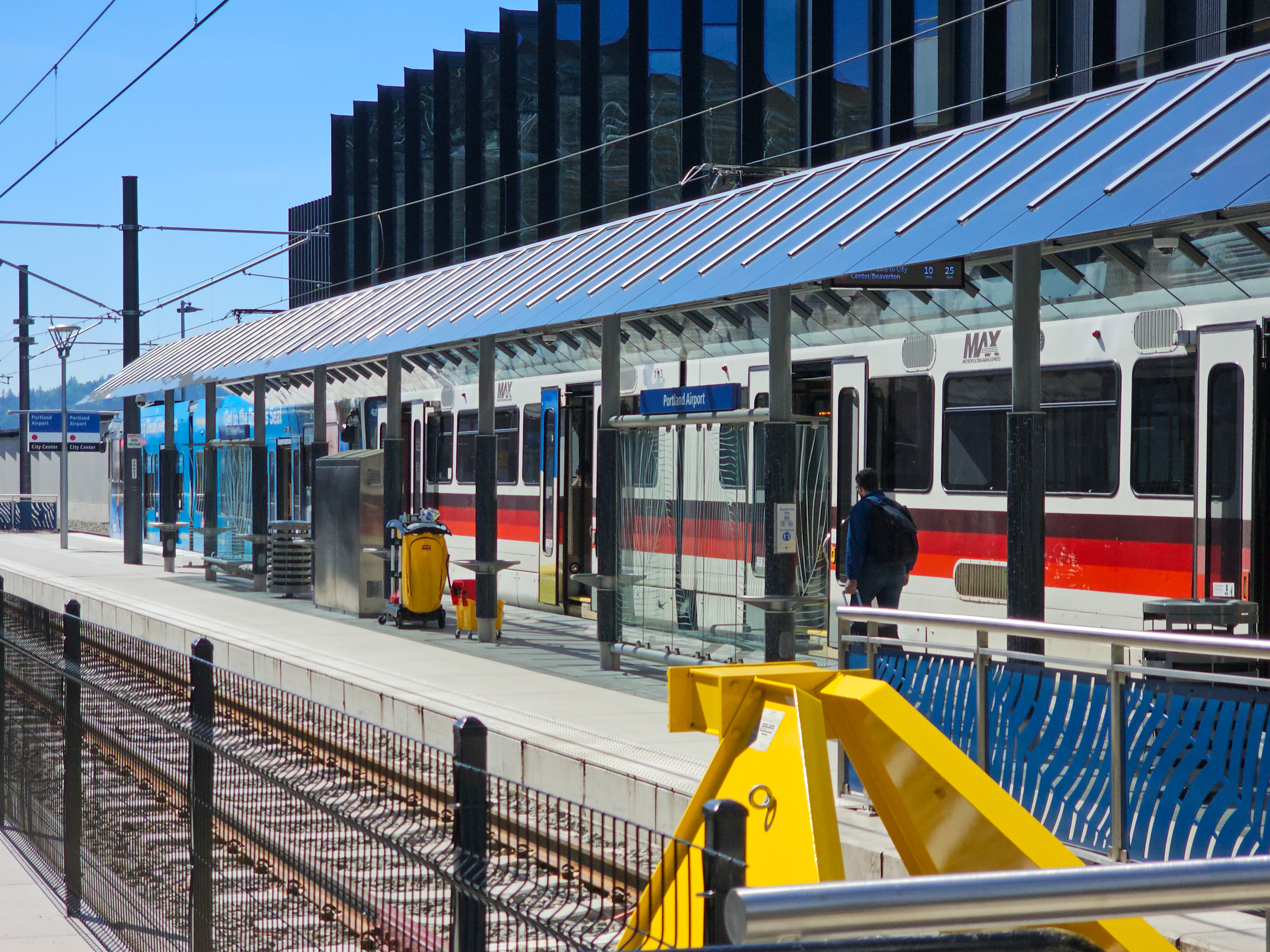
The station platform in 2024, after reconstruction

Portland Airport station's platform is situated at ground level just outside the main passenger terminal, near the southernmost entrance, and within 150 ft (45.7 m) of the baggage claim area. Prior to the 2023 renovation, it featured a wedge-shaped island platform and a glass canopy designed by ZGF Architects. The rebuilt platform is rectangular. An 80-seat station lobby is located inside the terminal and has ticket vending machines and real-time displays showing train departure times. Prior to the 2023 renovation, the station occupied the end of a single-track section of the Airport MAX segment; the only other such section on the MAX system was the Red Line's merge with the Blue and Green Lines at Gateway/Northeast 99th Avenue Transit Center. The Gateway segment was upgraded to double track in 2024 with the construction of a new platform north of the original station to serve inbound trains.

=== Public art ===
Public art pieces commissioned for the Airport MAX Project have a common theme of "flight". Portland Airport station houses one art installation as part of TriMet's Public Art Program. Time Flies by Christine Bourdette is a large, porcelain enamel mural displayed on a wall between the station platform and the baggage claim area. The work is described as "a sequence of images related to time and motion". Bourdette also installed bronze rails that lead passengers from the escalators to the platform and blue chevrons on the platform pavement to depict movement.

== Services ==
Portland Airport station is served by the MAX Red Line, which connects the airport to Northeast Portland, Portland City Center, Beaverton, and Hillsboro. In spring 2023, the station recorded an average of 1,705 boardings on weekdays. The day's first train arrives from Beaverton Transit Center. The last three westbound trips travel eastbound to Ruby Junction/East 197th Avenue station as through services of the Blue Line. Headway between trains varies from 15 minutes for most of the day to 30 minutes during the early mornings and late evenings. Services operate on all days of the week and are the most frequent on weekdays. Trains from the station take approximately 40 minutes to reach Pioneer Square in downtown Portland—where transfers to all lines are available—and approximately 65 minutes to reach the other end of the line at Beaverton Transit Center.
