= Cleveland Ave station =

Light rail station in Gresham, Oregon, US

Cleveland Ave
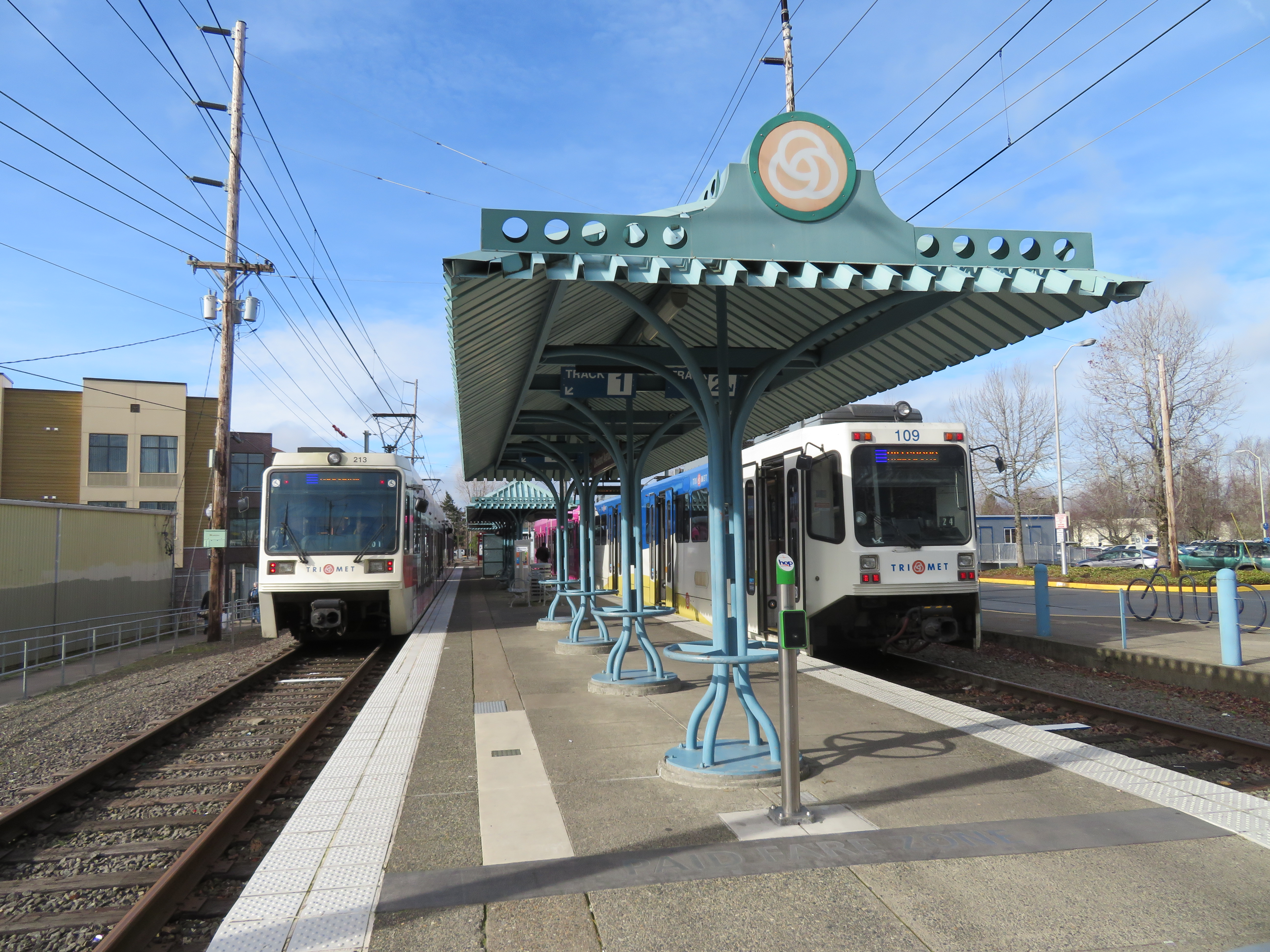
- Cleveland Avenue station platform

General information
- Location: 1200 NE 8th Street; Gresham, Oregon; U.S.
- Coordinates: 45°30′07″N 122°25′06″W
- Owner: TriMet
- Line: Eastside MAX
- Platforms: 1 island platform
- Tracks: 2
- Connections: TriMet: FX2

Construction
- Parking: 392 spaces
- Cycle facilities: Racks
- Accessible: Yes

History
- Opened: September 5, 1986

Services
Preceding station	TriMet	Following station
Gresham Central Transit Center toward Hatfield Government Center	Blue Line	Terminus
Location

Cleveland Avenue station is a MAX light rail station in Gresham, Oregon. The light rail station is the 26th and final stop eastbound on the current Eastside MAX line. It is the eastern terminus of the Blue Line.

This station has a large park-and-ride lot and is located just east of Cleveland Avenue in Gresham, between Northeast Division Street and East Powell Boulevard. Service began at this station in 1986, when the original Eastside MAX opened.

A short section of tracks and electrification continue east to allow for the storage of a two-car train on each track. There is also a double crossover switch directly west of the station which allows arriving and departing trains to use either track at the station. The station is named for Cleveland Avenue, an arterial street located just to the west, but access for cars is only via NE 8th Street. Alpha High School is not far from the station. The park and ride lot at the station tends to fill up at 8am on weekdays.

The station was located in TriMet fare zone 4 from its opening in 1986 until September 1988, and in zone 3 from then until September 2012, at which time TriMet discontinued all use of zones in its fare structure.

== Bus service ==
As of September 18, 2022, this station is served by the following bus line:

- FX2–Division
