= Hatfield Government Center station =

Light rail station in Hillsboro, US

Hatfield Government Center
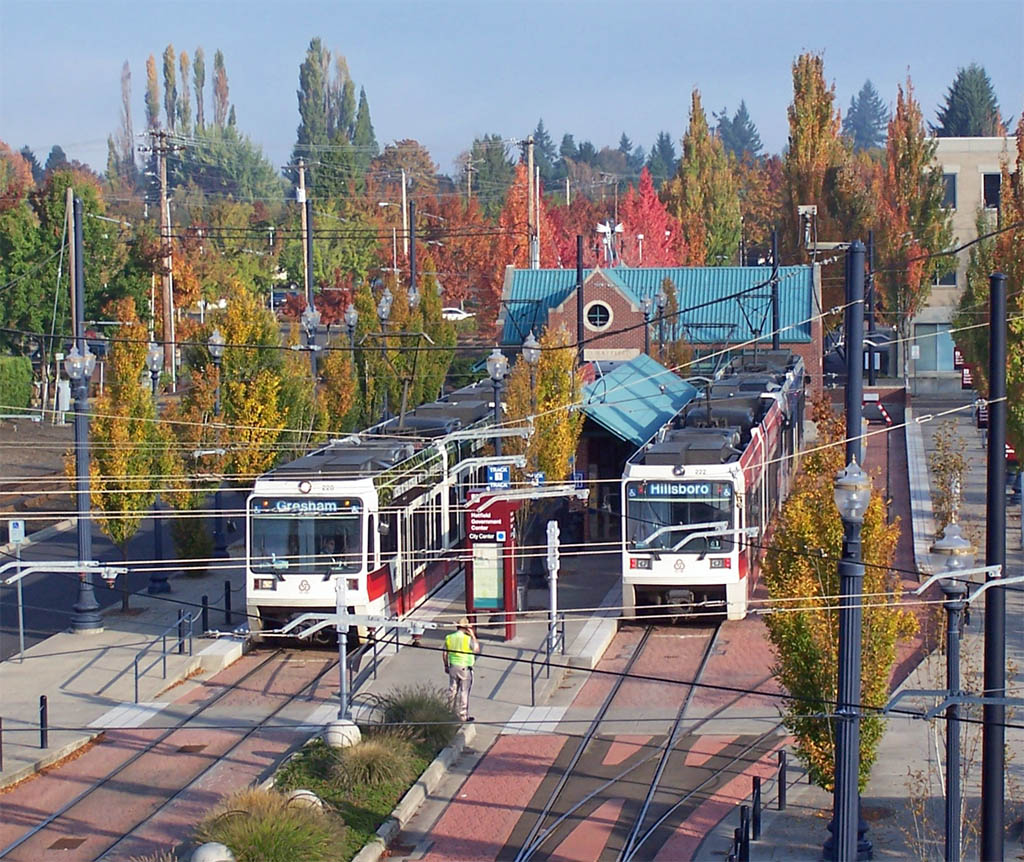
- Two light rail vehicles at the station platforms in 2005

General information
- Location: 110 SW Washington Street; Hillsboro, Oregon, U.S.
- Coordinates: 45°31′19″N 122°59′28″W
- Owner: TriMet
- Platforms: 1 island platform and 1 side platform
- Tracks: 3
- Connections: TriMet: 46, 57

Construction
- Structure type: At-grade
- Parking: 250 park and ride spaces
- Cycle facilities: Racks and lockers
- Accessible: yes

History
- Opened: September 12, 1998

Services
Preceding station	TriMet	Following station
Terminus	Blue Line	Hillsboro Central/SE 3rd Avenue Transit Center toward Cleveland Ave
Location

Hatfield Government Center station is a light rail station in downtown Hillsboro, Oregon, United States, served by TriMet as part of the MAX Light Rail system. It is the western terminus of the Blue Line. Opened in 1998, it is located in the same block as the Hillsboro Post Office and adjacent to the Washington County Courthouse and the Hillsboro Civic Center. The block is bounded by First and Adams streets on the east and west and Washington and Main streets on the south and north. The station is named in honor of Mark O. Hatfield, a former United States Senator from Oregon and light rail proponent. It is the furthest west light rail station in the Continental United States.

== History ==
Construction of the Westside MAX project began in 1993. In November 1996, Hillsboro and TriMet named the yet-to-be-completed station at the western end of the project as the Mark O. Hatfield Government Center Station. Hatfield was retiring from 30 years as U.S. Senator and previously used his political clout as Chairman of the Senate Appropriations Committee to ensure funding for the project. In June 1998, after completion of the station but prior to its opening, government officials held a dedication ceremony at the station. Hatfield, who had by then retired, was in attendance as the station was officially dedicated in his honor.

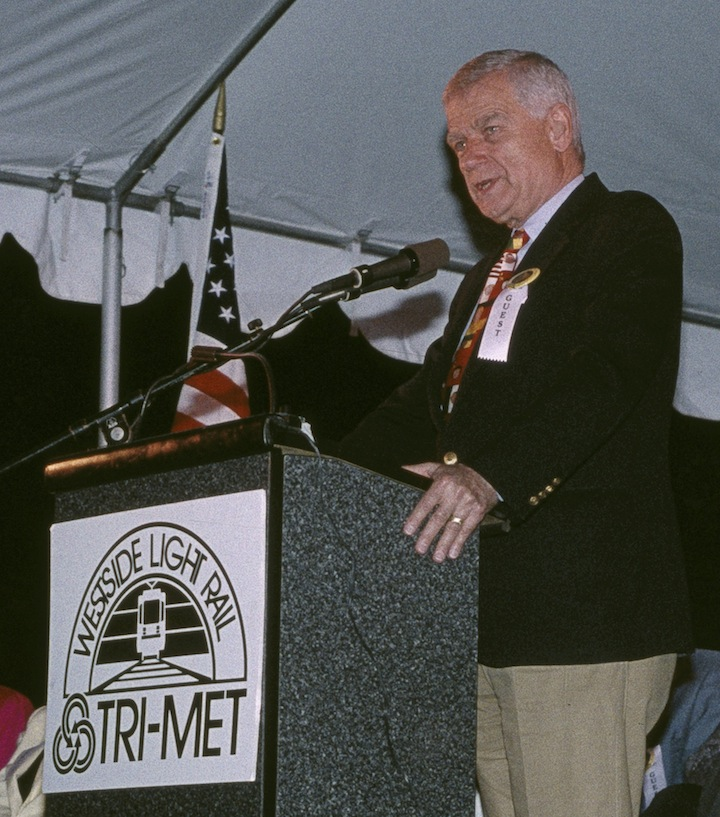
Senator Hatfield at 1993 groundbreaking ceremony for the Westside MAX line

On September 12, 1998, Hatfield Government Station opened along with the Westside MAX line. Dedication ceremonies for the line at the station included a speech by then U.S. Vice President Al Gore and U.S. Transportation Secretary Rodney E. Slater. Oregon politicians speaking at the dedication included Governor John Kitzhaber, former Congressman Les AuCoin, then Congresswoman Elizabeth Furse, U.S. Senators Ron Wyden and Gordon Smith, and former Senator and station namesake Mark Hatfield. Scheduled train service began at 11:00 a.m., which was followed by a two-day opening party.

The station was the busiest stop on the Westside line by 1999 with an average of 3,005 daily boardings. In March 2008, TriMet added additional capacity during the morning and evening commuting period. This was accomplished by extending three Red Line trains from the Beaverton Transit Center stop each morning and evening during peak ridership times.

== Amenities ==
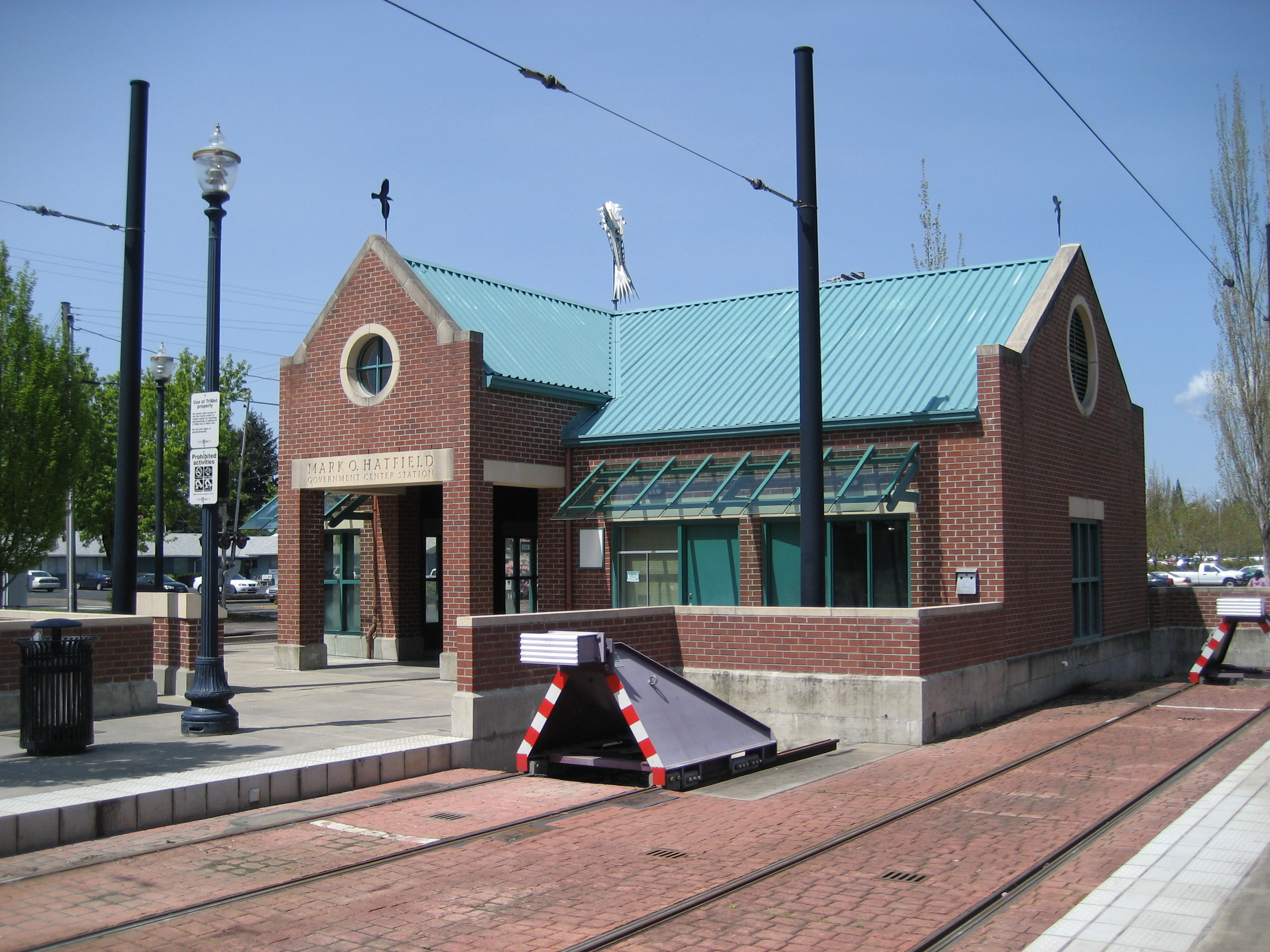
The station building

Located at the Hatfield Government Center station is a parking garage for park-and-ride passengers. The garage includes 250 parking spaces accessible 24-hours a day. The stop is compliant with the Americans with Disabilities Act, contains bike racks and bike lockers, and has an electronic reader board listing up-to-date arrivals of trains.

Hatfield Government Center is part of TriMet's Blue Line and has three sets of tracks and three platforms. One track is only used when passenger demand is high. The central island platform includes a covered shelter, and each platform has ticket vending machines. The parking structure is located across Washington Street, to the south.

The north end of the station features a light-red brick and green-roof building that contains space for use by the train and bus operators. The building is postmodern in style and includes rose windows, false chimneys, and gables. The entire station was designed by the architectural firm OTAK Inc. and also includes an electrical substation. Hatfield's name is etched in the façade of the main station building in stone.

Trains lay over at this station to reverse and go eastward to Beaverton, Portland, and Gresham. Development built near the station includes many civic and Washington County offices. Near the station is the Washington County Sheriff's office, the county jail, the courthouse, the Hillsboro Civic Center, and other government offices. Retail shops are located at street level in the parking structure. Portland Community College's Hillsboro Education Center is also housed in the street level space at the garage.

=== Art ===
As with all the stops on the Westside MAX, displays of public artwork were included in the construction of the stop. Overall the artwork at the station reflects the gathering and dispersal of people and the harvest. Christine Bourdette, a sculptor, working with the architects from OTAK designed some of the artwork at Hatfield Station. Described as a "clash of sensibilities" and "organically abstract", items include sculptures of bronze baskets and granite balls installed at the southern end of the station. Attached to the station's building is a bronze work entitled "Gathering Rail" which resembles twine woven together and is intended to represent the various themes of the community coming together.

Other station artwork includes a three-part bronze plaque featuring Hatfield's face in relief and other images representing the entire Blue line. Designed by graphic artist Elizabeth Anderson and sculpted by Bill Bane, the other images are the Robertson Tunnel that runs through the West Hills, Mount Hood, the Oregon Convention Center, and the Steel Bridge. On the roof of the passenger shelter is a wind vane designed by artist Miles Pepper. Representing agriculture, the design includes an abstract scarecrow, crows on the corners of the roof, and a portion that extends into the shelter that displays a seed, all moving with the wind.
