= Elmonica/SW 170th Ave station =

Light rail station in Beaverton, Oregon, U.S.

Elmonica/SW 170th Ave
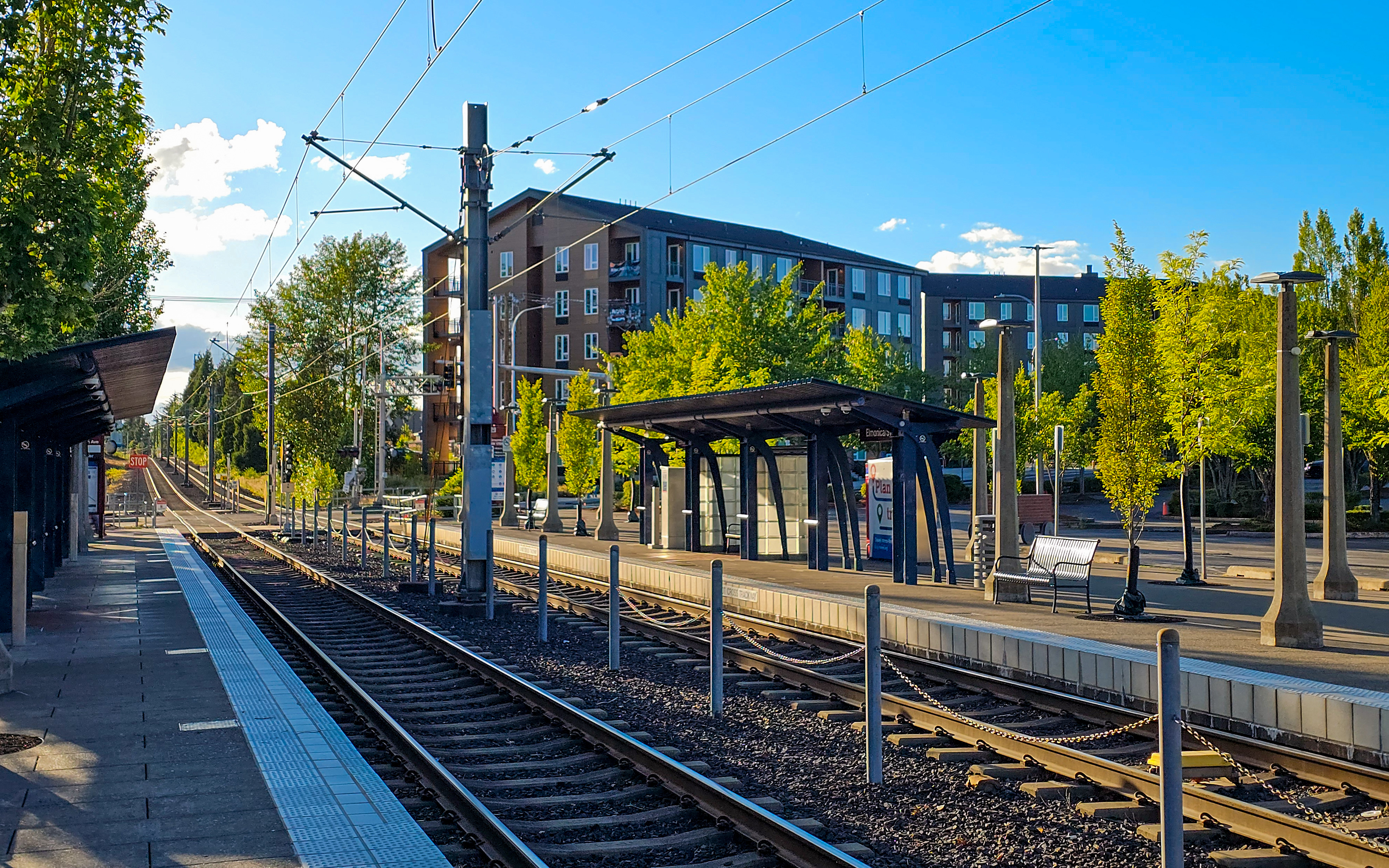
- The station platform in 2026, facing west

General information
- Location: 1200 SW 170th Avenue; Beaverton, Oregon; USA
- Coordinates: 45°30′35″N 122°51′04″W
- Owner: TriMet
- Platforms: 2 side platforms
- Tracks: 2

Construction
- Parking: 435 park and ride spaces
- Accessible: yes

History
- Opened: September 12, 1998

Services
Preceding station	TriMet	Following station
Willow Creek/Southwest 185th Avenue Transit Center toward Hatfield Government Center	Blue Line	Merlo Rd/SW 158th Ave toward Cleveland Ave
Willow Creek/Southwest 185th Avenue Transit Center toward Hillsboro Airport/Fairgrounds	Red Line	Merlo Rd/SW 158th Ave toward Portland Airport
Former services
Preceding station	Oregon Electric Railway	Following station
Elmonico toward Forest Grove	Forest Grove branch	St. Marys toward Garden Home
Location

Elmonica/SW 170th Ave station is a light rail station on the MAX Blue and Red lines in Beaverton, Oregon, United States. Named after a former station on the Oregon Electric Railway, it is the eleventh stop westbound on the Westside MAX. The side platform stop is located between Hillsboro to the west and Beaverton to the east.

== Details ==
The station has two side platforms. To the northeast of the station is one of the facilities where MAX trains are stored and serviced, called Elmonica Yard, or "Elmo Yard" for short. As a result, most trains in the morning start here, and go west to Hillsboro's Hatfield Government Center station before heading to Gresham's Cleveland Avenue station, and service at the end of the day splits between terminating here or Merlo Road/Southwest 158th Avenue, and Hillsboro's Hatfield Government Center station and returning eastward to the yard.

== History ==
Elmonica station is named after the area, which was named after a station on the old Oregon Electric Railway. The MAX line follows the old Oregon Electric right-of-way and shares several stop names with the old interurban. The name derives from the names of the daughters of an owner of land along the route. Samuel B. Stoy, a Portland insurance executive, owned property along the proposed OE line and only gave permission for the railroad to go through his property if the company agreed to name the station after his daughters, Eleanor and Monica. After the station was named Elmonica, this then led to the area around the station becoming known as Elmonica as well.
