= School of Science and Technology =

Location
- 10740 NE Walker Road; Hillsboro, Oregon; United States

Information
- Type: Public
- Established: 1993; 33 years ago
- Closed: 2020; 6 years ago
- School district: Beaverton
- Principal: Andrew Cronk
- Faculty: 8
- Grades: 9–12
- Enrollment: 170 (2015–16)
- Campus: Capital Center
- Campus type: Suburban
- Colors: Blue and silver
- Mascot: Flying Hedgehog
- Website: SST Homepage

The School of Science and Technology (SST) was an accredited, public high school located in Beaverton, Oregon, United States. It was a magnet program for students who have an interest in mathematics, life and physical sciences, and technology. It is part of the Beaverton School District (BSD). It was established in 1993, as the School of Natural Resources Science and Technology, and later renamed. SST moved at the end of 2015 to expanded and remodeled facilities at a site it shares with BSD's Health and Science School. For the 2020–2021 school year and onward, this school and the neighboring school, the Beaverton Health & Science School have merged to become the Beaverton Academy of Science and Engineering.

In 2017, U.S. News & World Report ranked SST as the best high school in Oregon. For 2015, the magazine had ranked SST second among public high schools in the Beaverton School District (first among schools offering AP programs), fourth in the state of Oregon, and 598th nationally. The Oregonian ranked SST first in its 2015 school performance ratings within the Beaverton School District.

== History ==
SST began as a Certificate of Initial Mastery program called the School of Natural Resources Science and Technology (NRST) in 1993, and was one of the magnet programs at the then-new Merlo Station High School, located on S.W. Merlo Drive just west of the then-planned Merlo Road/SW 158th MAX Light Rail station (which opened in 1998). The school occupied an old warehouse, which was renovated a few months before the program's opening. The name was eventually shortened to School of Science and Technology (SST) in 2001.

At the end of 2015, SST moved from the Merlo Station campus to newly remodeled space about one to two miles to the west, in the Capital Center development at N.W. 185th Avenue and Walker Road. BSD's Health & Science School, another option school, had already been located at Capital Center since its 2007 establishment, so SST's move made the two programs neighbors, allowing them to share some facilities, such as a cafeteria and library.

== Students ==
As of February 2015, 68% of students were Caucasian, 15% Asian or Pacific Islander, 8% Hispanic, 2% Black, and 7% fit into multiple categories. 15% were on free or reduced lunch, 19% were eligible for special education, and 1% were enrolled in ESL. 30% were enrolled in TAG in middle or elementary school, significantly higher than the 11% district average.

== Academics ==
The average SAT score in 2015 was 593 in critical reading, 642 in math, and 582 in writing. The average ACT composite score was 27. In the 2015 Regional Science Fair, SST had eight Special Award Winners and ten Category Winners; and had two Category Winners in the 2015 State Science Fair.

== Application process ==
Until 2007, students were required to follow an application process which involved writing three essays and an interview from an SST teacher. However, in effect from 2007 to 2008 onward, the Beaverton School District simplified the application process to a single "option school" application. This removed the essays and the interview from the application process. Due to the controversy of the change in application process, the Beaverton School District modified their new system to allow 15% of students to be accepted based on talent or sibling status, while the other 85% would continue to use the streamlined application.

This new application process is a point of controversy among students, who hold one of two points of view. The first is that the incoming students will not be weeded out through the harder application, which, before the change, meant that only students that wanted to attend would be accepted to SST. They fear that the attitude of students who are accepted into SST through the easier application will change the school's unique culture. The second opinion is that SST will gain new life from the potential flood of new students who were put off by the old application process. Students of this line of thought refer to the fact that the class of 2010 turned out to be much smaller than any other class in recent history, presumably from lack of applicants under the old application process. This was a result of the teachers being unable to promote SST to as many 8th graders. The new application process, arguably better, promotes SST to incoming freshmen.

=== Shadowing ===
All applicants to the School of Science and Technology are encouraged to shadow a current student for a day. This allows the applicant to see the school in its entirety, and to see a "day in the life" of an average student. This enables them to make the most informed decision regarding their application. If an applicant decides to shadow, he or she is assigned to a student of the same gender, same high school, and a similar grade, as the shadow. In addition to shadowing, attending school open houses and tours is promoted.

== Merger ==
Starting with the 2020–2021 school year, Health and Science School merged with School of Science and Technology, becoming the Beaverton Academy of Science and Engineering.
