= Tonquin =

Tonquin may refer to:

== Ships ==
- Tonquin (1807), an American merchant vessel destroyed on Vancouver Island in 1811
- Tonquin (1845), a later American commercial vessel that sank in 1849 near San Francisco, CA
- SS City of Paris (1865), a French steamship briefly named Tonquin that sank in 1885

== Locations ==
- Tonquin Valley, a valley located in Alberta
- Tonquin Pass, a mountain pass in the Canadian Rockies
- Tonquin, Oregon, an unincorporated locale of Oregon

== Vietnam ==
- Tonkin, the northern region of Vietnam
- Tonquin War, an alternative name for the Sino-French War

== Plants ==
- Tonquin bean, a flowering pea tree native to Central and South America
