= Fulton Park =

Fulton Park may refer to:

- Fulton Park (Brooklyn), New York, U.S.
- Fulton Park (Portland, Oregon), U.S.
