= Latourell, Oregon =

Unincorporated community in the state of Oregon, United States

- Unincorporated community
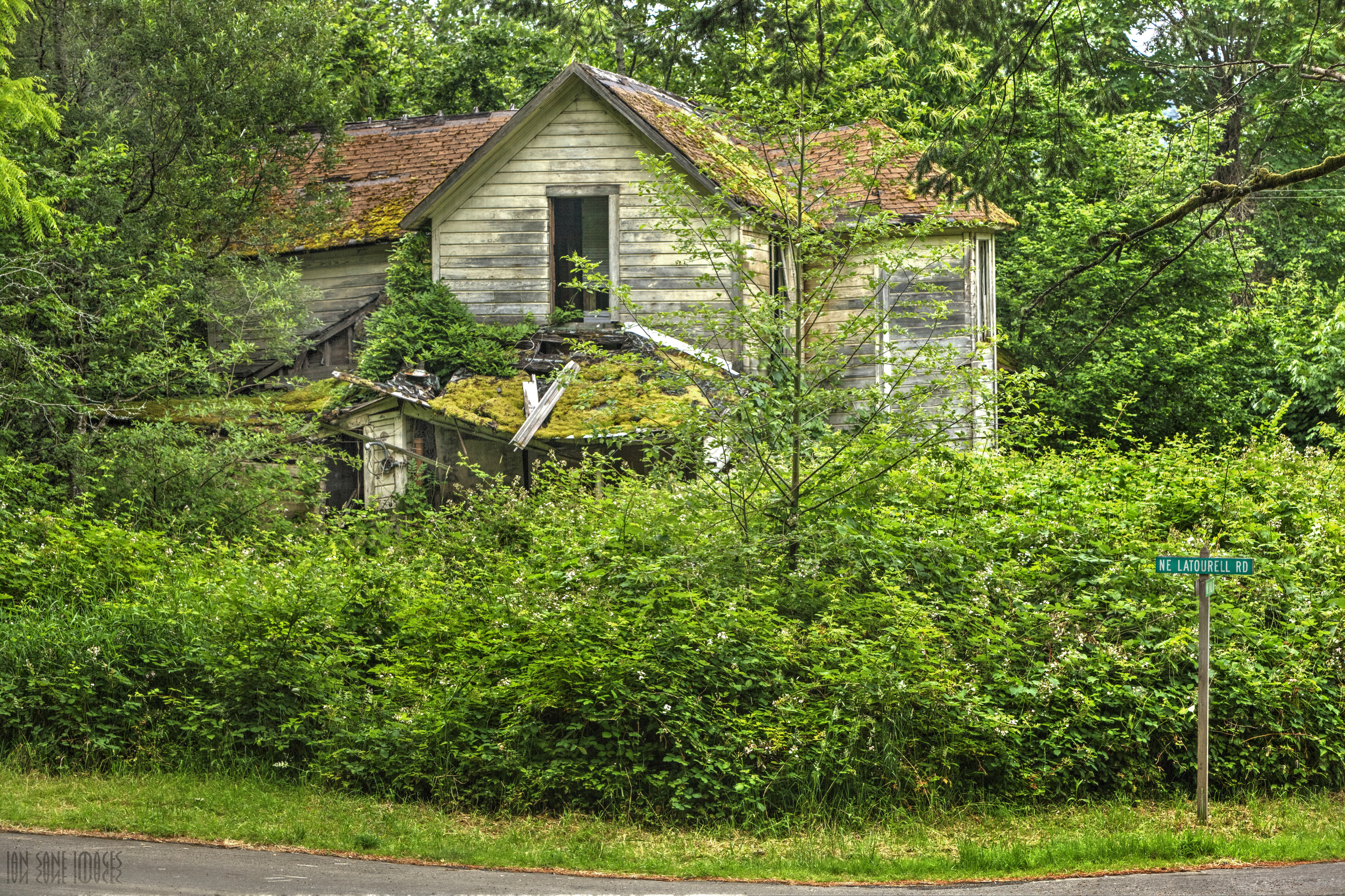
- Old Latourell House, 2016

- Location within Oregon Location within the United States
- Coordinates: 45°32′26″N 122°13′16″W
- Country: United States
- State: Oregon
- County: Multnomah
- Elevation: 72 ft (22 m)

Population (2020)
  - Total: 3,261
- Time zone: UTC-8 (Pacific (PST))
  - Summer (DST): UTC-7 (PDT)
- GNIS feature ID: 1167712

Latourell is an unincorporated community located in Multnomah County, Oregon, United States, on the Historic Columbia River Highway about eight miles (13 km) east of Troutdale and 5.5 miles (8.9 km) west of Multnomah Falls. Compared to its peak in the 1880s, it is now virtually a ghost town.

== History ==
Latourell Falls and the town of Latourell were named for Joseph "Frenchy" Latourell who immigrated to Oregon in the 1850s. Latourell owned a mercantile and a fish wheel, and he was a boatman on the Columbia River.

The first post office in the area was called Rooster Rock after the natural feature; it was established in May 1876. Joseph Latourell became postmaster in August 1876, and the name of the post office was changed to Latourell Falls a year later. The office closed in 1964. The name of the local railroad station was "Latourell".

The falls are on property formerly owned by Guy W. Talbot and now part of Guy W. Talbot State Park. Latourell Prairie, on the bluffs above the river and east of the falls, is also named for Joseph Latourell.

The Latourells had eight children and were known to Portlanders who visited by steamboat to sing, dance, dine and listen while the family played musical instruments.

At its height, Latourell was a working timber town and had five saloons and a well-known brass band. Large scale commercial logging did not arrive until the 1880s. Before that, many Columbia River Gorge residents cut and delivered cordwood to Columbia River steamships.

== See also ==
- List of ghost towns in Oregon
