= Chemawa =

Chemawa may refer to one of these United States subjects:

- The Chemawa band of the Kalapuya tribe of Native Americans
- Chemawa, Oregon, a former community now part of Salem, Oregon
  - Chemawa Indian School, a Native American boarding school in Oregon
- Chemawa Middle School, a school in the Riverside Unified School District in California
