= Merlo Station High School =

Public school in Beaverton, Oregon, United States

Location
- 1841 SW Merlo Drive; Beaverton, (Washington County), Oregon 97006; United States; 45.506081°N 122.847592°W

Information
- Type: Public
- Opened: 1993
- School district: Beaverton
- Principal: Dr. Jonathon Sanchez
- Grades: 9-12
- Enrollment: 457 (2008)
- Colors: Maroon and forest green
- Website: Merlo Station High School
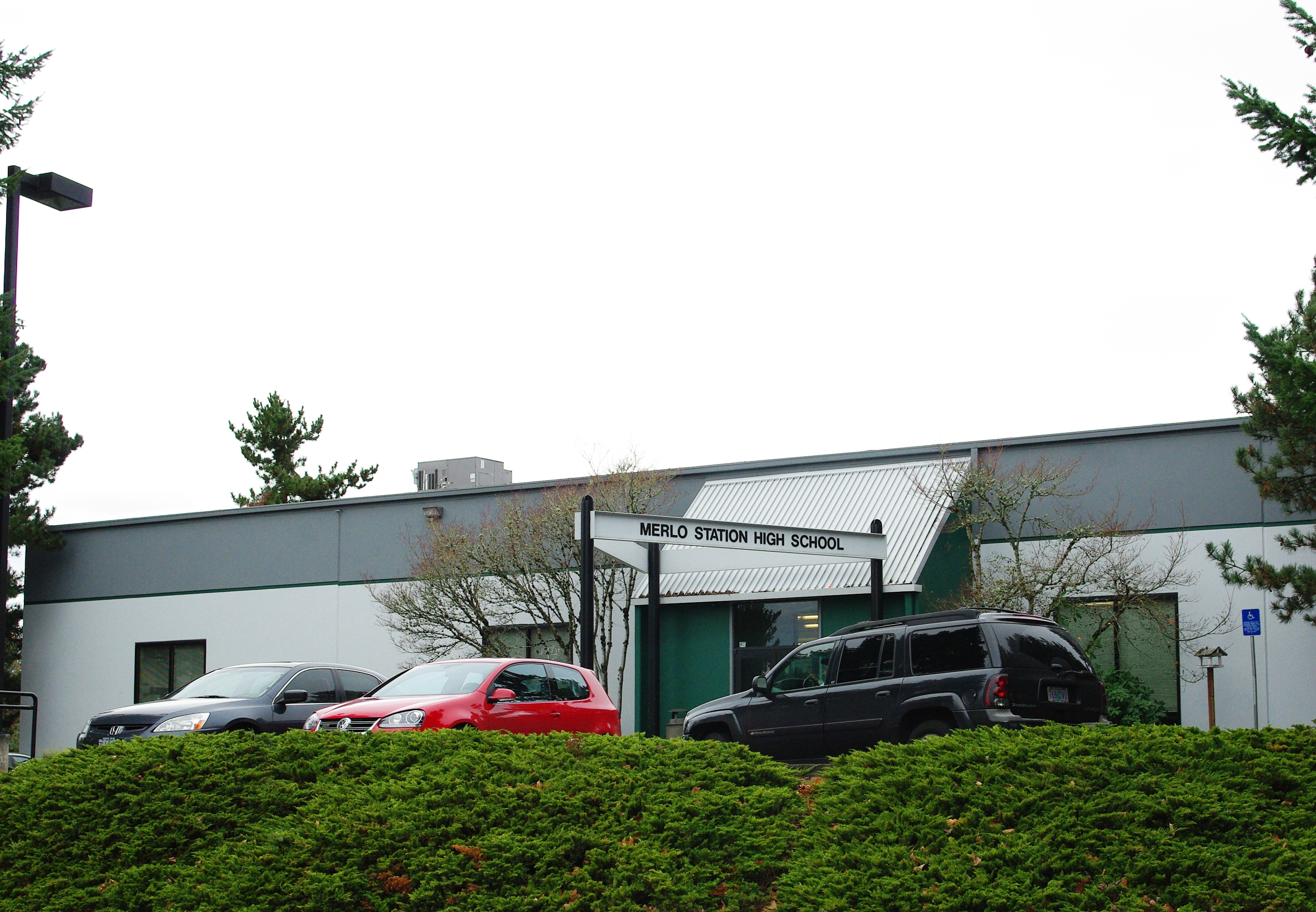

Merlo Station High School is a public high school located in Beaverton, Oregon, United States, which is part of the Beaverton School District (BSD). It is considered an "options" high school, meaning that it houses several different scholarly magnet programs that differ from "traditional" high schools. This allows Merlo Station to meet the many different needs of all its students. The school opened in 1993. One of the option schools that had been at Merlo Station campus since its opening in 1993, the School of Science and Technology, moved at the end of 2015 to a different site, shared with BSD's Health & Science School.

== Academics ==
=== Community School ===
The Community School contains 215 students in grades 9-12. In 2008, 33% of the seniors received a high school diploma. Of 67 students, 22 graduated, 12 dropped out, and 33 were still in high school in 2009.

=== Merlo Station Night School ===
The Merlo Station Night School contains 75 students in grades 10-12. In 2008, 48% of the seniors received a high school diploma. Of 42 students, 20 graduated, four dropped out, and 18 were still in high school in 2009.

=== School of Science and Technology ===
The School of Science and Technology (SST) was part of Merlo Station High School until the end of 2015. In 2010, it had 178 students in grades 9-12. In 2010, 100% of the seniors received a high school diploma. Of 36 students, 36 graduated and none dropped out.

At the end of 2015, SST moved out of Merlo Station High School to the Capital Center, a business park located at the southwest corner of NW 185th Avenue and Walker Road, already the site of BSD's Health & Science School.

== See also ==
- Merlo MAX station
