= Guy W. Talbot State Park =

State park in Oregon, United States

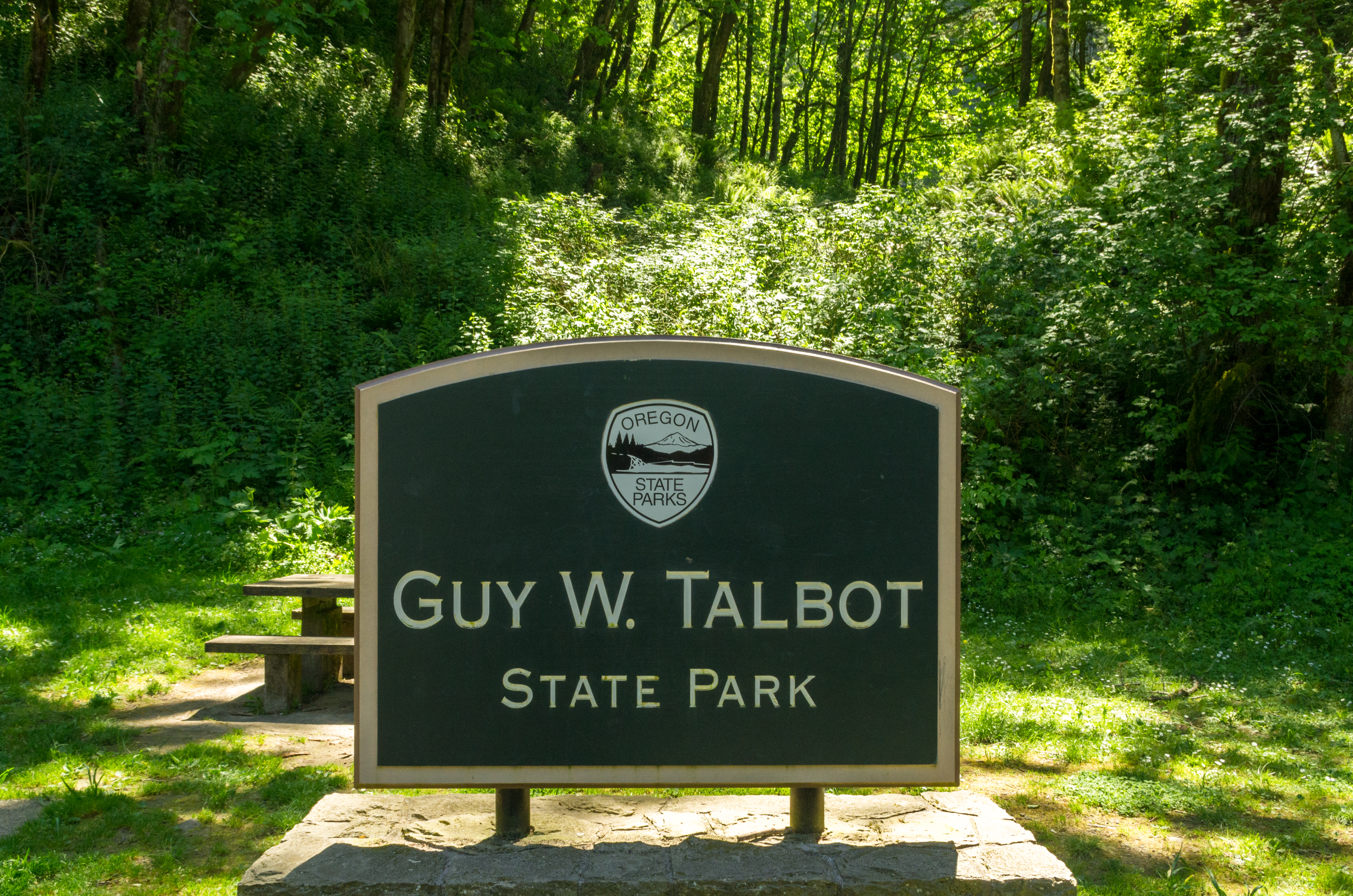
- Guy W. Talbot State Park entrance sign, May 2016

- Location within Oregon Location within the United States
- Type: Public, state
- Location: Multnomah County, Oregon
- Nearest city: Troutdale
- Coordinates: 45°32′07″N 122°13′31″W
- Operator: Oregon Parks and Recreation Department

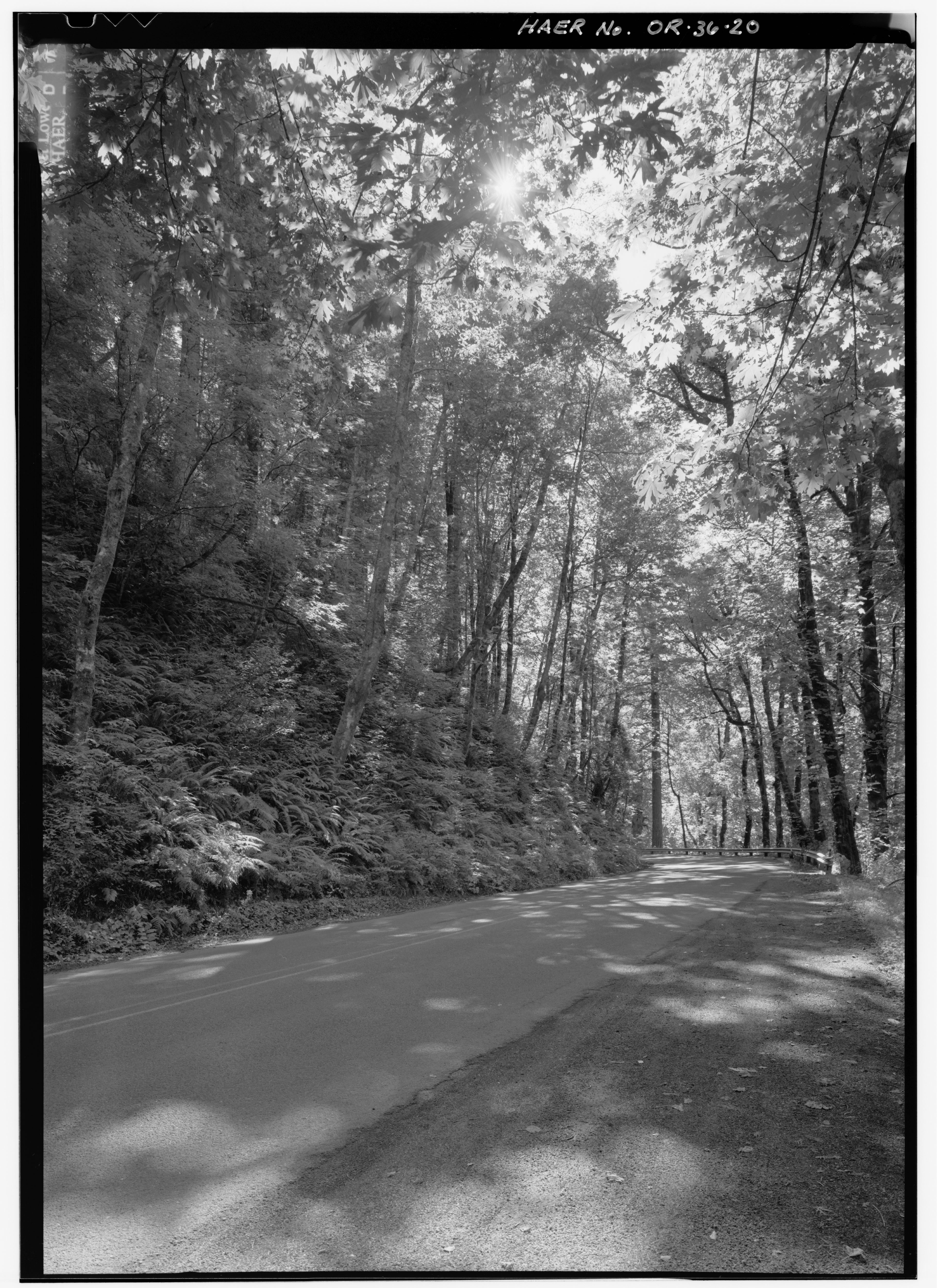
Along the Figure-Eight Loops

Guy W. Talbot State Park is a state park in the Columbia River Gorge, near Troutdale, Oregon, United States. Although the main feature of the park is Latourell Falls, the parkland stretches west to the Crown Point State Scenic Corridor. Here the Historic Columbia River Highway descends from Crown Point via the Figure-Eight Loops, a series of horseshoe curves that "develop distance" and thus keep the grade to a minimum.

== History ==
Guy Webster Talbot and his family used this property as a summer estate. The falls itself was located on the property of Guy W. Talbot of Portland, who, in 1929, donated 220 acres (0.89 km^{2}) of property to the State of Oregon.

== Guy Talbot ==
In 1903, Talbot married Geraldine Wallace, of Kingman, Kansas, and they were the parents of three children: Sara Jane, who was the wife of Charles G. Dimon, of New York; Prudence; and Guy W., Jr. Dimon was the sole heir to the Smith & Dimon Shipbuilder empire in New York. Smith and Dimon were the builders of the Sea Witch, whose record-breaking run from China to New York was great news of that day.

In 1906 Talbot came to Portland as vice president and general manager of the Astoria & Columbia River Railroad and the Corvallis & Eastern Railroad, and was later made vice president and general manager of the Oregon Electric Railway, which he completed, holding that position until the road was sold, when he went to the American Power & Light Company of New York, which bought the Portland Gas & Coke Company, of which Talbot was made president, still holding that position.

In 1910, he was also made president of the Pacific Power & Light Company. In 1915 the American Power & Light Company purchased the control of the Northwestern Electric Company and at that time he was also elected to the presidency of that Company. He was also president of the Walla Walla Valley Railroad, which was sold to the Northern Pacific Railroad Company, but he still remained as vice president and director. He was president of the Deschutes Power & Light Company, a director of the Electric Products Corporation and a director of the Pacific Properties Company. A man of alert mentality, progressive ideas and intensely practical in his methods, he has shown marked ability in the management of the important interests of which he was the head, and earned the respect of all who knew him. His great-grandson David Talbot Dimon still resides in Oregon. Dimon and his wife continue to be benefactors of the park.

== See also ==
- Talbot, Oregon
