= Waconda, Oregon =

- Unincorporated community
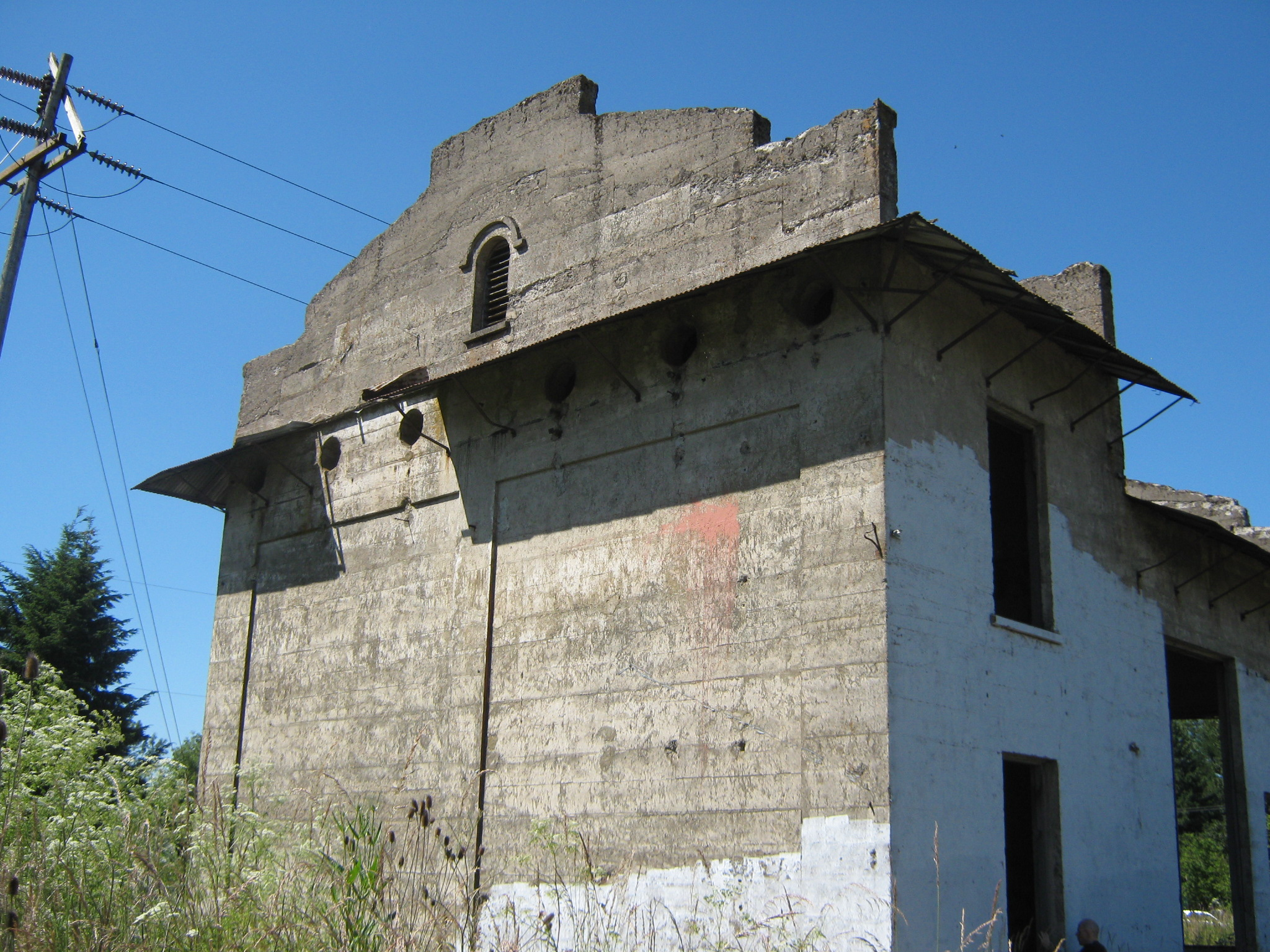
- Former Oregon Electric substation at Waconda

- Location within Oregon Location within the United States
- Coordinates: 45°4′31″N 122°58′37″W
- Country: United States
- State: Oregon
- County: Marion
- Established: 1907
- Elevation: 177 ft (54 m)
- Time zone: UTC-8 (Pacific (PST))
  - Summer (DST): UTC-7 (PDT)

Waconda is a historic unincorporated community in Marion County, Oregon, United States, near the crossroads of River Road Rd NE and Waconda Road NE on the French Prairie.

Waconda was once a station on the Oregon Electric Railway and it formerly had a post office by the same name. The station was named when the railroad was built through the area in 1907, and the post office was established in 1912. There was previously a community called Waconda about a mile south of Gervais established in 1870 on the former line of the Oregon & California Railroad (now owned by Union Pacific). The name may come from the Great Plains Native American word "Wakonda" (something consecrated). Waconda was one of a series of OE stations with Native American names; one station to the south was named for Chinookan leader Comcomly and the next one to the north was named for Kalapuyan "Chief" Quinaby.

In 1915, Waconda had a store and a population of 40. An American Foursquare house near the ruins of the OE station once served as the post office and is still standing.

Agriculture in the area includes the growing of hops, berries, fruit, and the production dairy products.
