= Latourell Falls =

Lower Latourell Falls
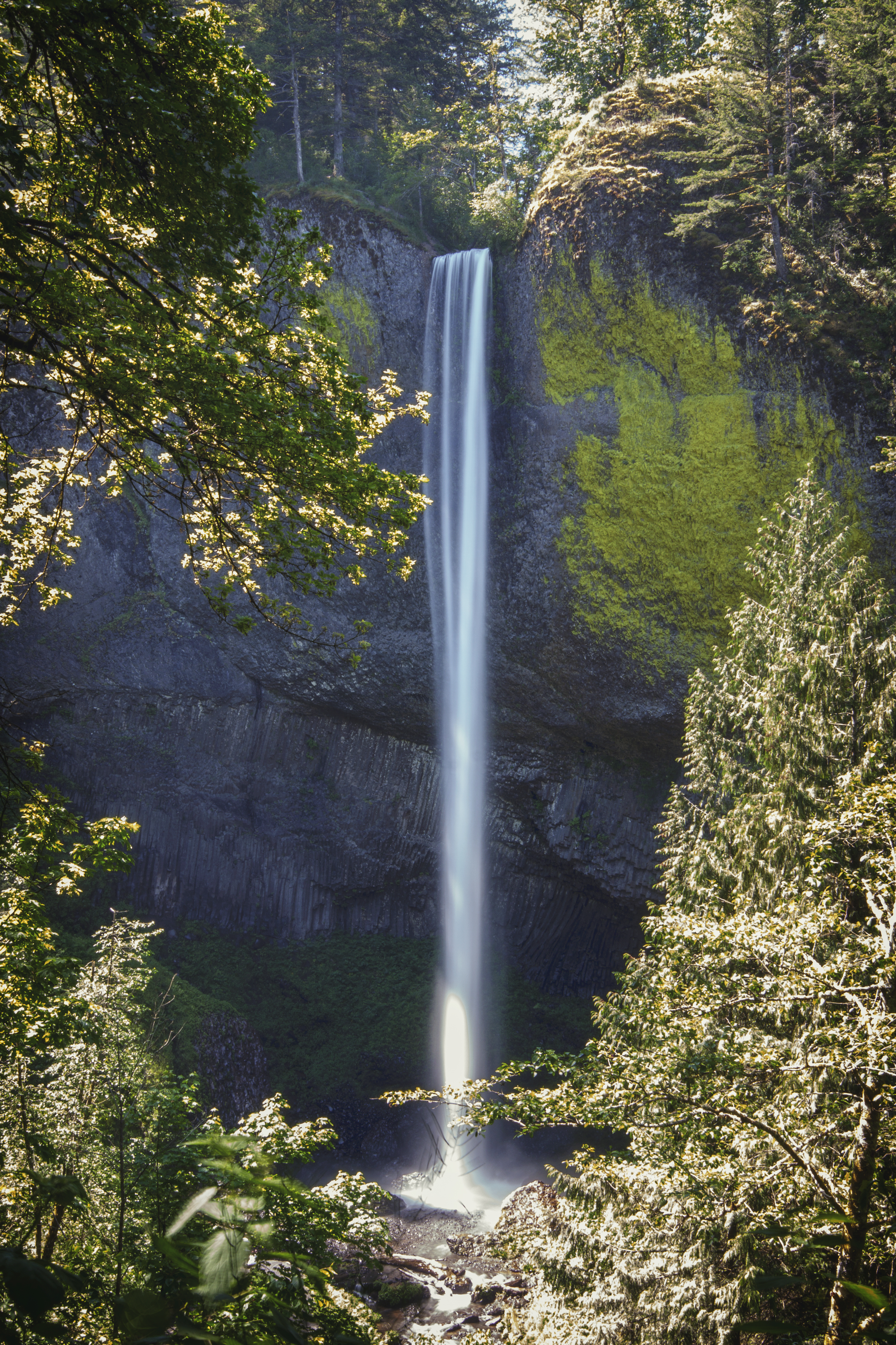
- The waterfall in 2006
- Interactive map of Lower Latourell Falls
- Location: Columbia River Gorge, Multnomah County, Oregon, United States
- Coordinates: 45.53710°N 122.21686°W
- Total height: 249 ft (76 m)
- Number of drops: 1

Latourell Falls is a waterfall along the Columbia River Gorge in the U.S. state of Oregon, within Guy W. Talbot State Park.

The Historic Columbia River Highway passes nearby, and at certain locations the Lower falls are visible from the road. Near the base of the falls, a parking lot and path were erected to assist visitors to the site. Visitors must hike along the 2.1-mile (3.4 km) loop trail to see the upper falls.

The Latourell Creek Bridge, below the falls, is a contributing structure in the Historic Columbia River Highway's listing on the National Register of Historic Places and in its designation as a National Historic Landmark.

Latourell is unique among the best-known Columbia Gorge waterfalls, in the way that it drops straight down from an overhanging basalt cliff. Most of those falls (even the famous Multnomah Falls) tumble to some degree.

Latourell Falls is an excellent example of columnar basalt formations.

== See also ==
- Latourell, Oregon
- List of bridges documented by the Historic American Engineering Record in Oregon
