= Talbot, Oregon =

Unincorporated community in Oregon, US

Coordinates: 44°45′39″N 123°05′46″W

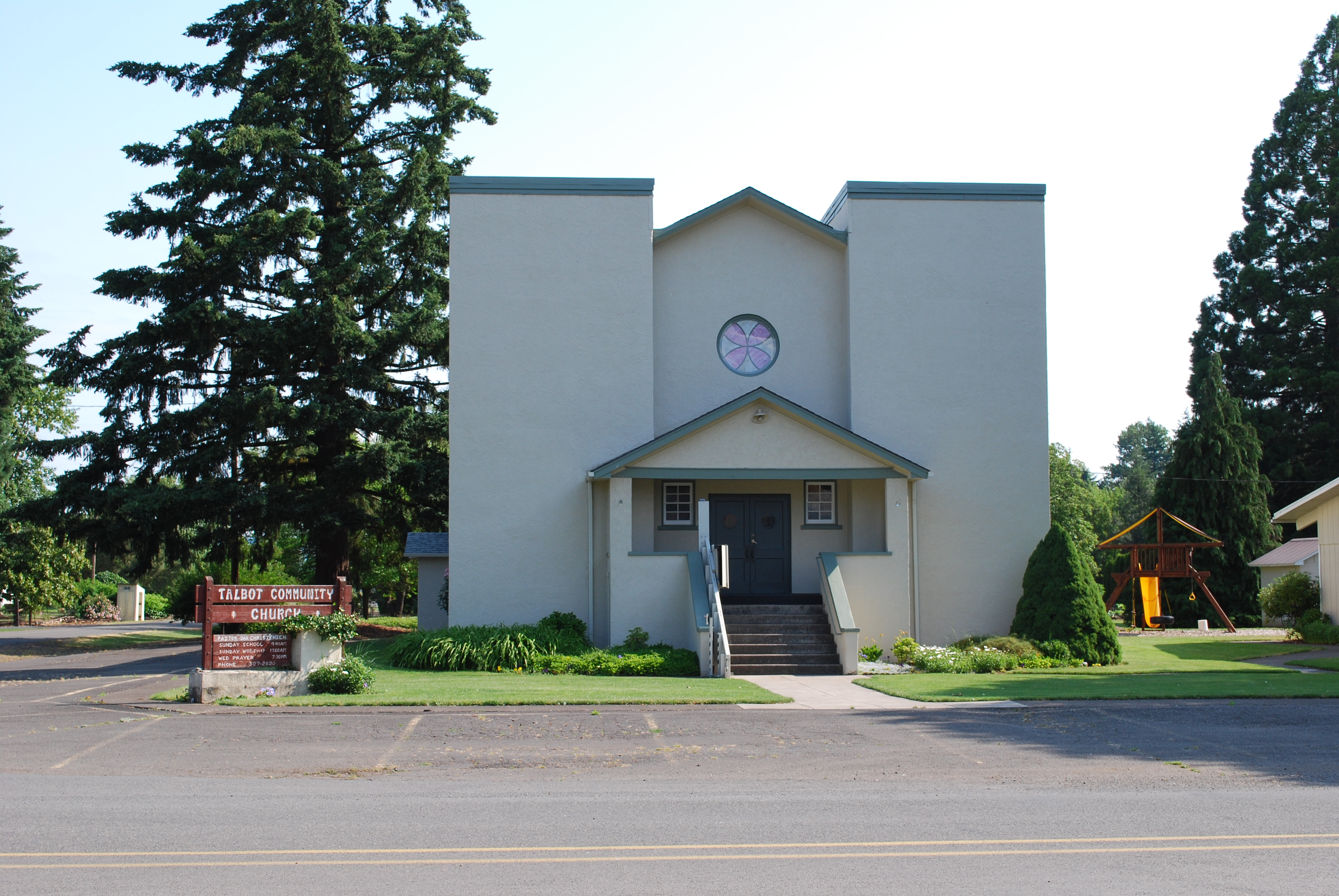
Talbot Community Church

Talbot is an unincorporated community in Marion County, Oregon, United States. It was named after Guy W. Talbot, the first vice-president and general manager of the Oregon Electric Railway Company. The station was first known as Roby, after a pioneer family in the vicinity but the name was changed to Talbot when it became confused with "Ruby" in Multnomah County.

== See also ==
- Guy W. Talbot State Park
