= Oregon Electric Railway =

Former interurban railroad

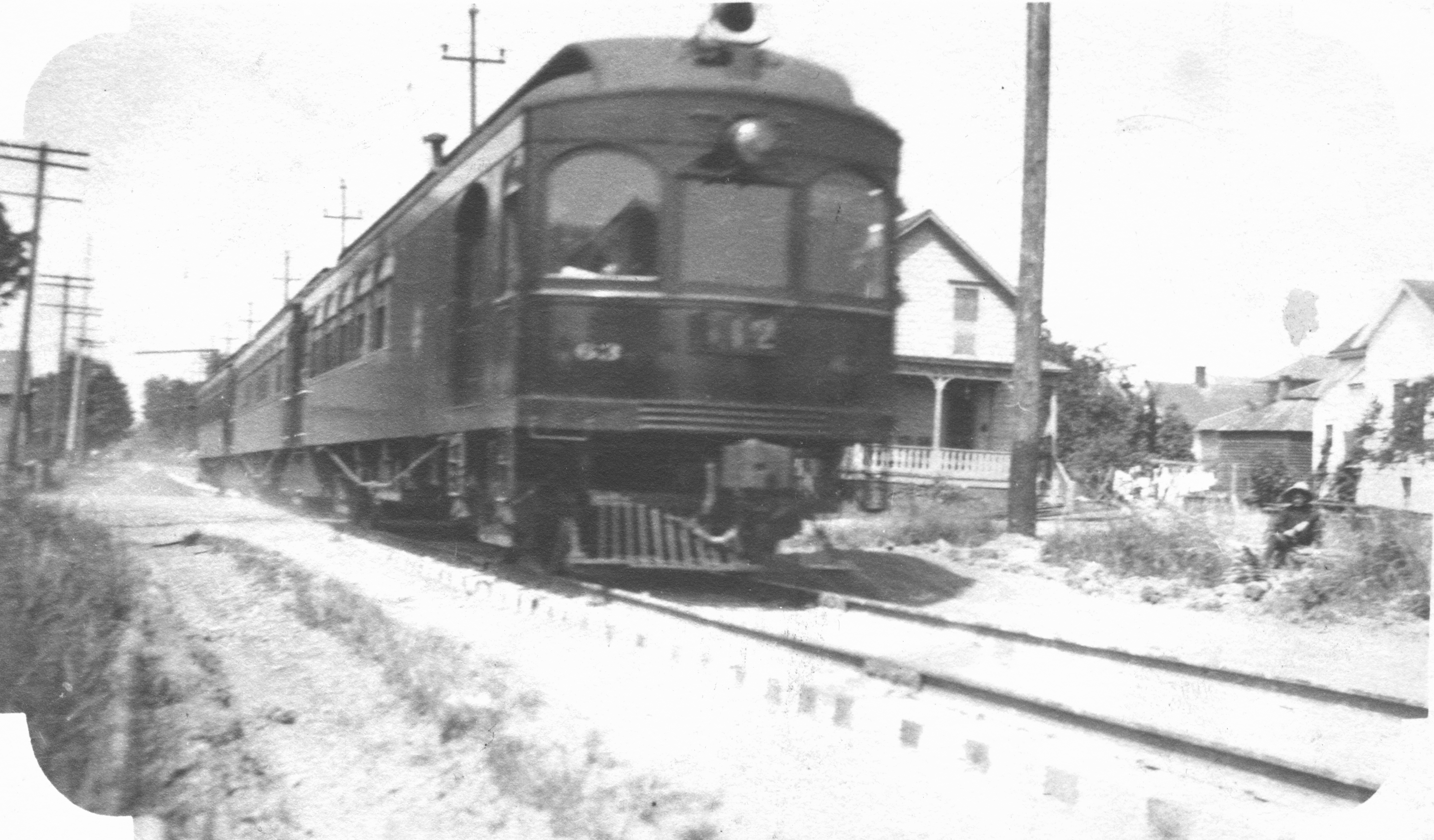
- Oregon Electric train passing through Albany, Oregon

Overview
- Dates of operation: 1906–1970
- Successor: Burlington Northern Railroad

Technical
- Track gauge: 1,435 mm (4 ft 8 1/2 in)
- Electrification: 600 V DC (1906–1912); 1,200 V DC (1912–1945)

The Oregon Electric Railway (OE) was an interurban railroad line in the U.S. state of Oregon that linked Portland to Eugene.

== History ==
Service from Portland to Salem began in January 1908. The Spokane, Portland and Seattle Railway purchased the system in 1910, and extended service to Eugene in 1912. After the company requested, and received, permission from the Interstate Commerce Commission to abandon a section of line in Portland because of declining ridership and worsening traffic congestion. Passenger service was cut back to Front and Jefferson streets the following day, and OE moved its ticket office to that location. The tracks along 10th and Salmon streets were abandoned and soon removed. Regular passenger service in the Willamette Valley ended in May 1933.

Electrified freight service continued until dieselization in 1945. The Oregon Electric was merged into the new Burlington Northern Railroad in 1970. The Burlington Northern operated the last freight train on the ex-OE Forest Grove branch on December 31, 1994, in preparation for the construction of Westside MAX, part of the TriMet light rail system.

== Route ==
The tracks run parallel to the main modern Union Pacific line between Portland and Eugene, used for freight and passenger service. The OE line is to the west, closely following the Willamette River. In the 2000s, the line has been under consideration as an alternative for Amtrak's Cascades and Coast Starlight passenger lines. Removing passenger service from the clogged Union Pacific track would improve the timeliness of the trains, permit higher capacity, and allow higher-speed travel, peaking at 110 miles per hour (180 km/h).

The right-of-way between Portland and Tigard has since been abandoned. From the North Bank Depot, it followed 10th Avenue, Salmon Street, and the west bank of the Willamette River. Portions of the right-of-way between the South Waterfront and Multnomah Boulevard are currently under Interstate 5.

== Stations ==
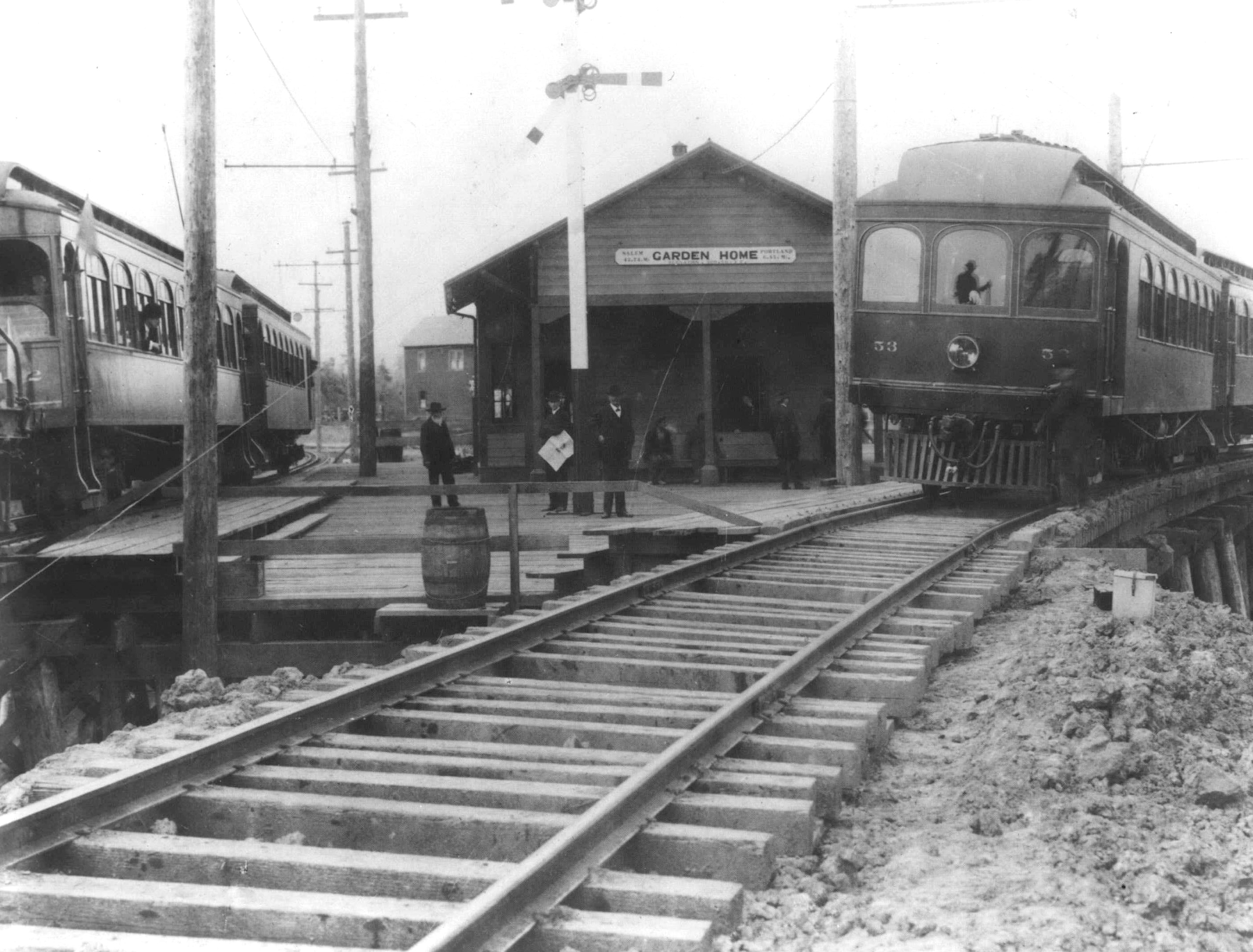
Garden Home Railway Depot c. 1911

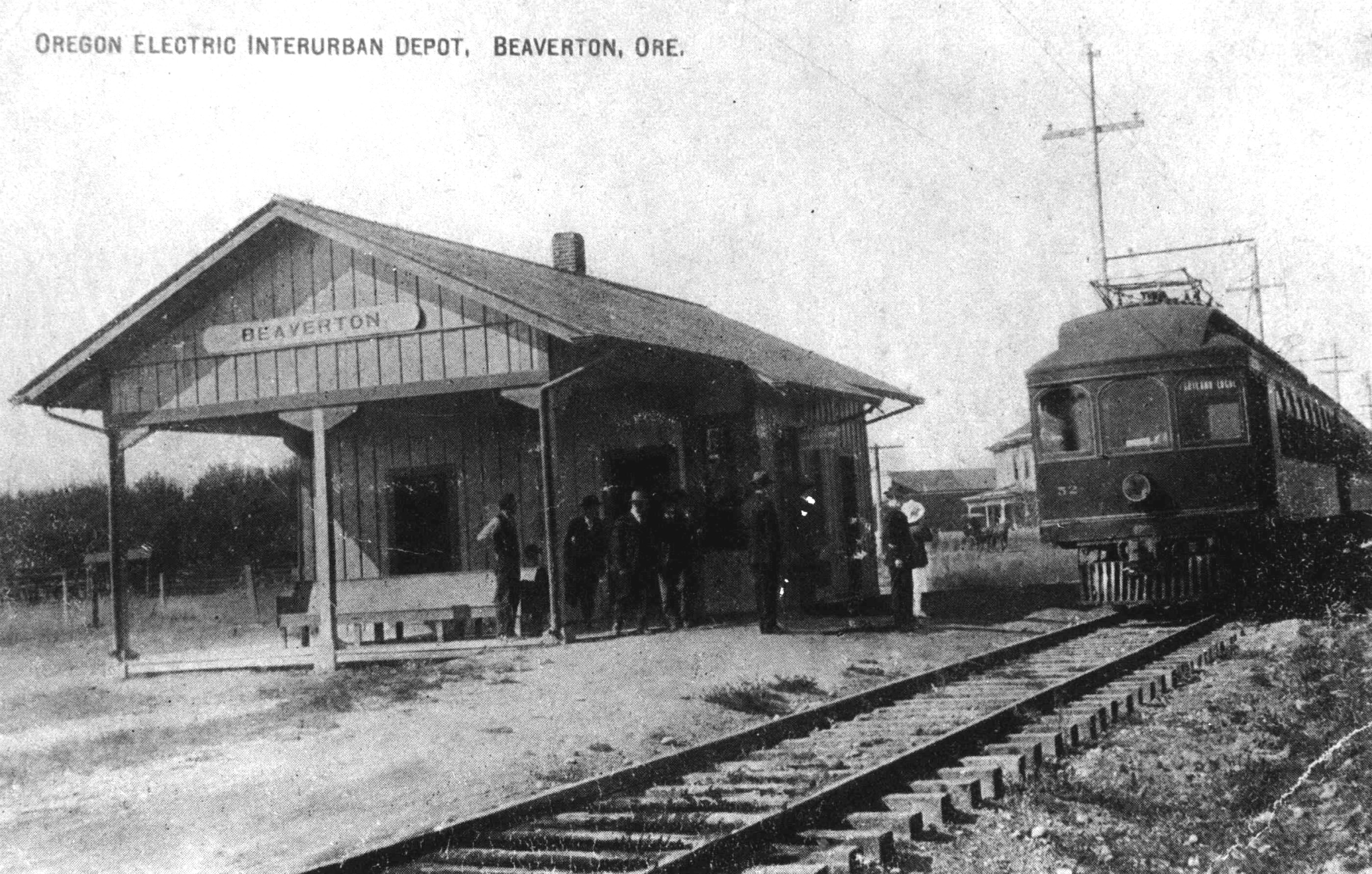
Oregon Electric Railroad Depot in Beaverton, Oregon

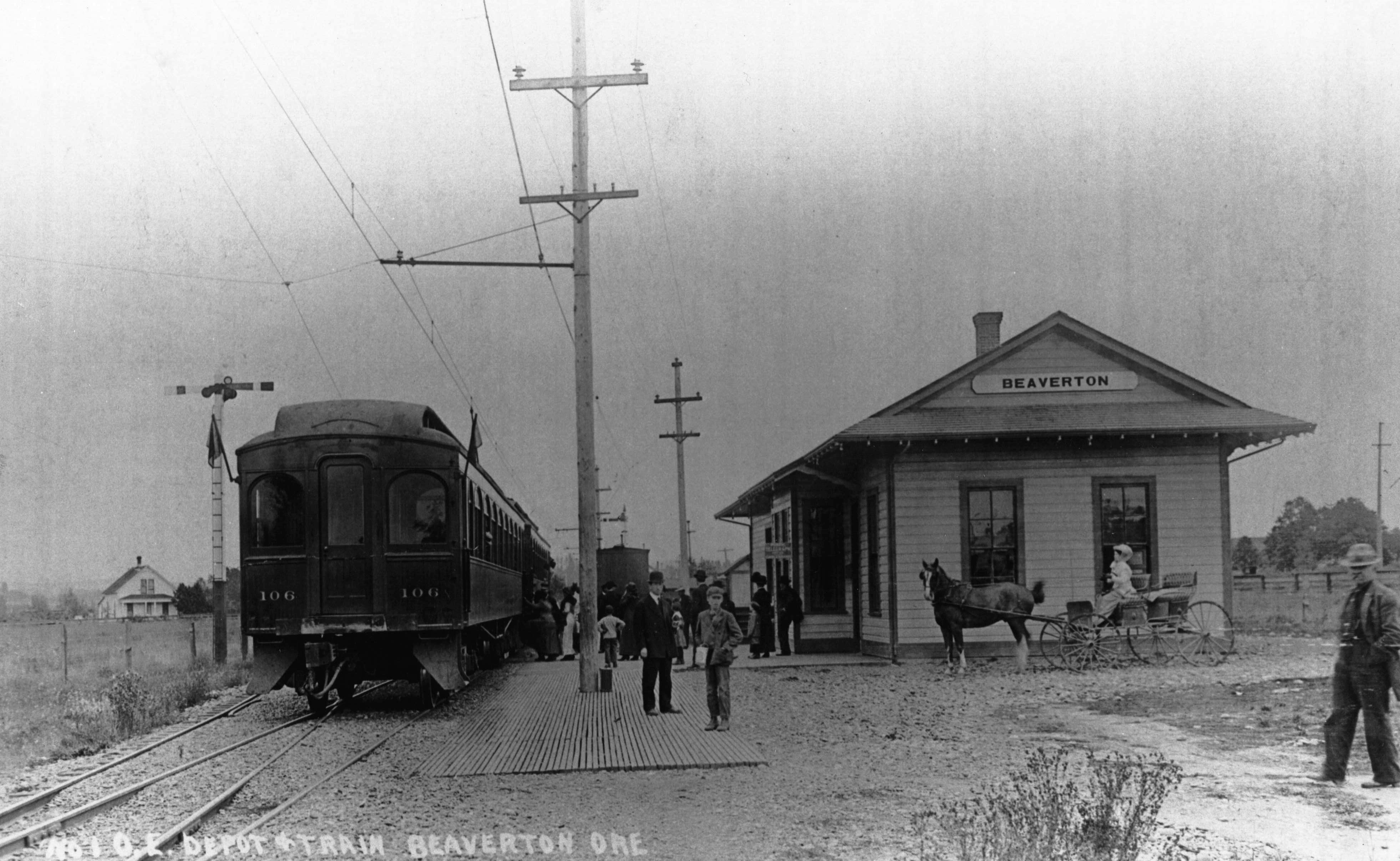
Beaverton Depot, c. 1911

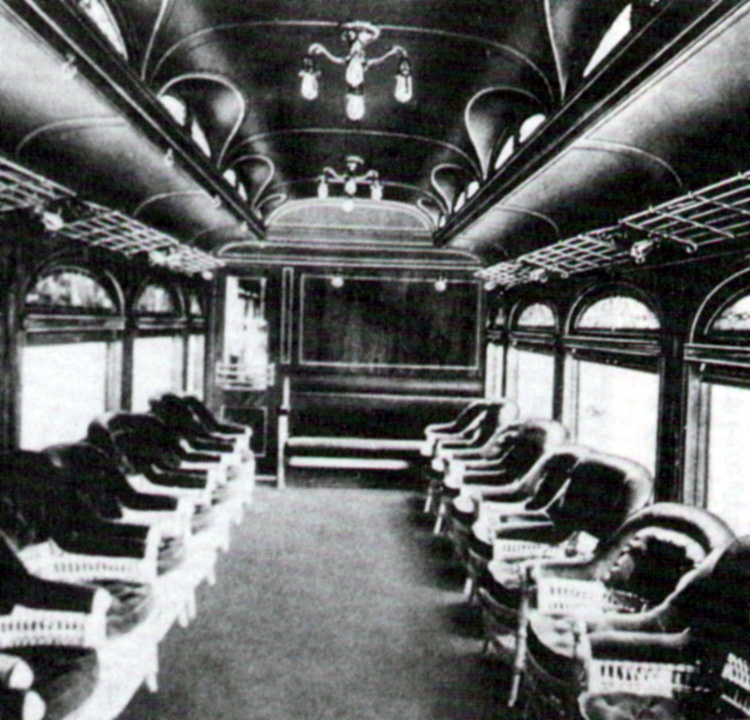
The interior of an Oregon Electric Railway train

=== Main line ===
In order from north to south

- Portland North Bank Depot
- 10th & Stark
- 10th & Morrison
- 5th & Salmon
- 2nd & Salmon
- Front & Jefferson
- View Point
- Fulton Park
- Capitol Hill
- Ryan Place
- Multnomah
- Shahapta
- Maplewood
- Barstow
- Garden Home
  - branch to Forest Grove
- Nesmith
- Metzger
- Greenburg
- Tigard
- Bonita
- Durham
- Tualatin
  - branch to McMinnville
- Nasoma
- Tonquin
- Mulloy
- Wilsonville
- Prahl
- Butteville
- Fargo
- Donald
- Fellers
- Broadacres
- West Woodburn
  - spur to Woodburn
- Saint Louis
- Concomly
- Waconda
- Chemeketa (now Hopmere)
- Quinaby
- Chemawa
- Claxtar
- Deaf School
- Highland
- Salem
- Melas
- Livesley
- East Independence
- Orville
- Sidney
- Talbot
- Dever
- Conser
- Albany
- Pirtle
- Gray
  - spur to Corvallis
- Oakville
- Fayetteville
- Potter
- Tulsa
- Nixon
- Cartney
- Harrisburg
- Junction City
- Milorn
- Meadow View
- Aubrey
- Enid
- Lasen
- Eugene

=== United Railways line ===
In order from west to east

- Wilkesboro
- North Plains
- Lincoln
- Helvetia
- Falkenberg
- Burlington
- Linnton

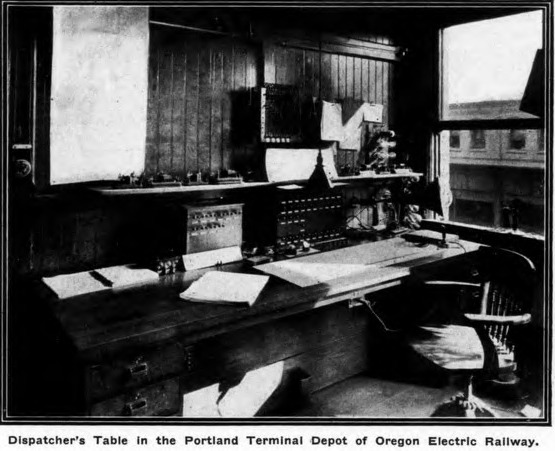
Dispatcher's table at the Portland Terminal Depot

=== Forest Grove line ===
In order from west to east

- Forest Grove
- Cornelius
- Hillsboro
- Orenco
- Quatama
- Elmonica
- Beaverton
- Whitford
- Garden Home

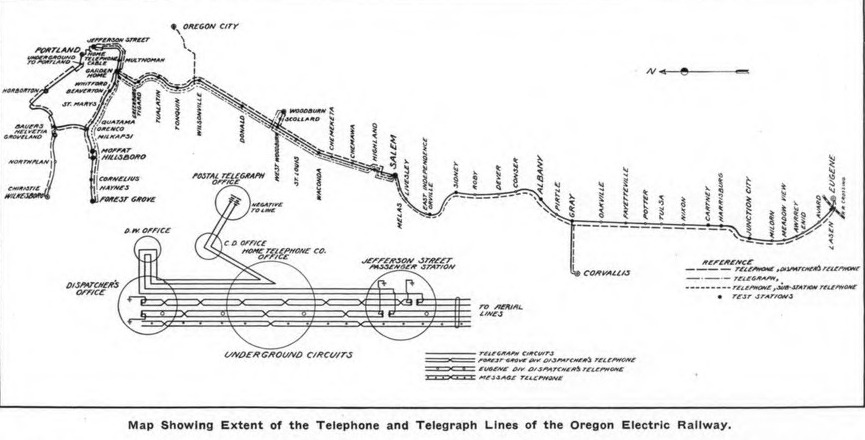
Map of telephony lines of the Oregon Electric Railway

== Remnants ==
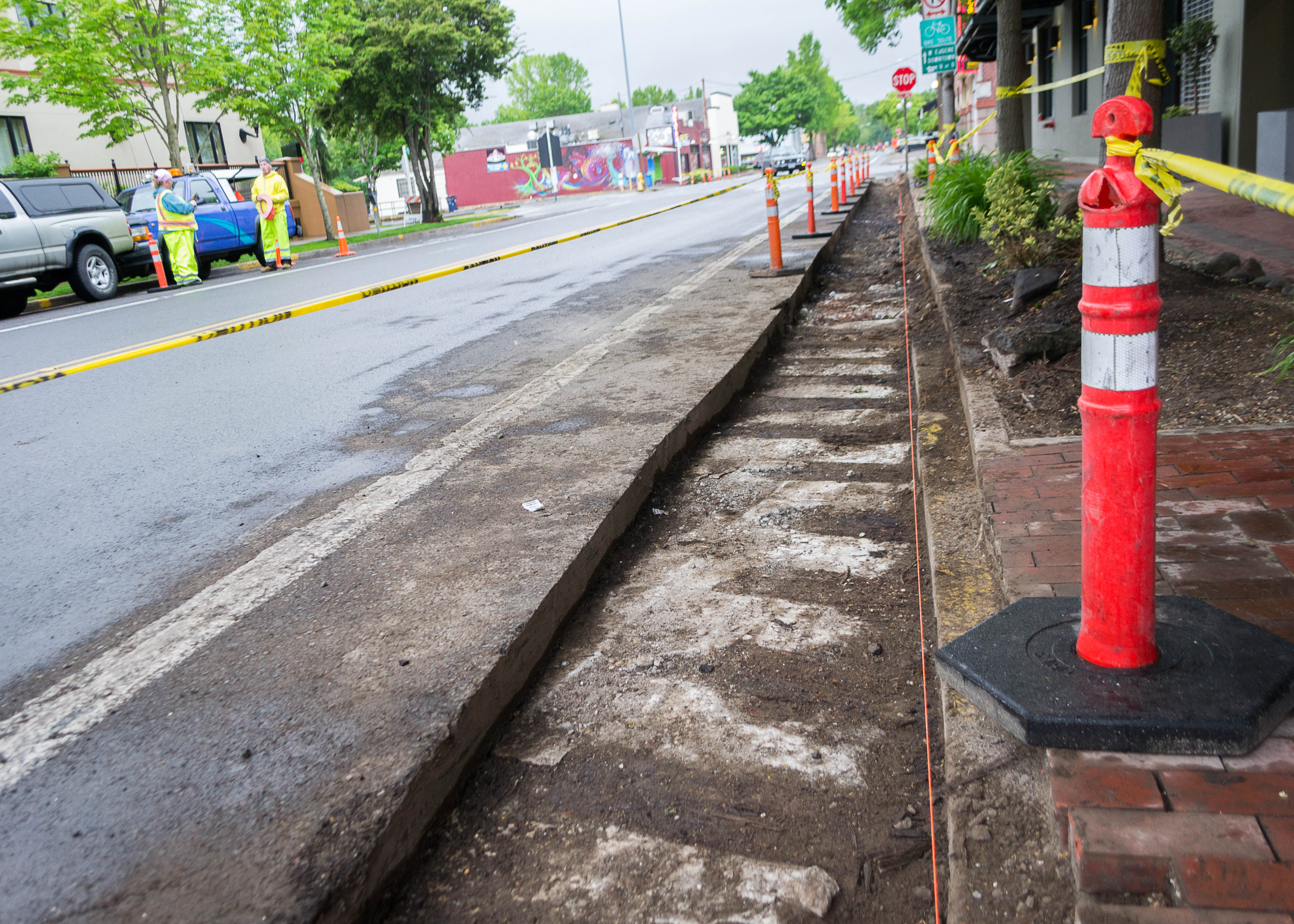
City workers uncover a section of railway ties beneath Fifth Avenue in Eugene, about two blocks from the Oregon Electric Railway Station. This view looks west between High and Pearl Streets.

- The Forest Grove Station is now owned by Friends of Historical Forest Grove, which is the town's historical society, This station was Southern Pacific Red Electric, Oregon Electric station was located behind current fire station.
- The former Oregon Electric line from Tigard to Eugene is now operated by the Portland & Western Railroad. BN donated the track from Tigard to Quinaby (a farming community north of Keizer) to the State of Oregon and sold the track to the Portland & Western. South of Quinaby, the line is still owned by BN successor BNSF and leased to P&W for operation.
- The OE branch between Hillsboro and Beaverton is now part of the MAX Blue Line.
- Passenger service is again available on the segment from Tigard to Wilsonville as part of the Westside Express Service (WES) commuter rail line. WES service continues north of Tigard to Beaverton using a former Southern Pacific track that the OE had used since the mid-1930s when its own route north of Tigard to downtown Portland was abandoned. The OE used to join with the ex-Southern Pacific track at Greton, located in the northern part of Tigard near the intersection of S.W. North Dakota Street and S.W. Tiedeman Avenue. Today, the original OE track ends and joins the former SP line southeast of S.W. Hall Boulevard. The parking lot of the current WES station in downtown Tigard is where the OE tracks used to lie; the abandoned right-of-way is still plainly visible north of downtown Tigard.
- The former station in Eugene had been reused and housed the Oregon Electric Station restaurant.
- The Albany station was a video poker outlet and later a pizza parlor. It underwent renovations from 2022 to 2025 to prepare for conversion into a restaurant.
- The Multnomah depot was located at the current site of the John's Market parking lot, on the northwest corner of SW 35th and Multnomah Blvd. The adjacent 1913 Nelson Thomas Building, characterized as "streetcar era commercial" architecture, still stands.
- The North Bank Depot in Portland was the northern terminal for the OE from 1912 to 1931. Used also as a warehouse, the building (and a matching one across the street) was preserved and converted into condominiums in the 1990s.
- The site of the Tigard station is now occupied by the Tigard Chamber of Commerce.
- The former Springfield Southern Pacific station was leased to Oregon Electric for a brief period. Is now a museum. It has an authentic semaphore signal and baggage car outside.
- Several of the railway's electric substations still exist, including those at Tonquin and Waconda.
- Seven passenger coaches, built in 1912-13 by American Car Company were disbursed to other interurbans after 1934: Two went to the Skagit River Railway in Washington until 1955, five went to the Pacific Great Eastern before all were reunited on the Vernonia, South Park & Sunset tourist line in Oregon. All were obtained by the Black Hills Central Railroad in the 1970s, and are still in use on this heritage railroad.

== See also ==
- Red Electric – a competing interurban service of the Southern Pacific Railroad in the Willamette Valley
- Oregon Electric Railway Historical Society
