= Forest Grove branch =

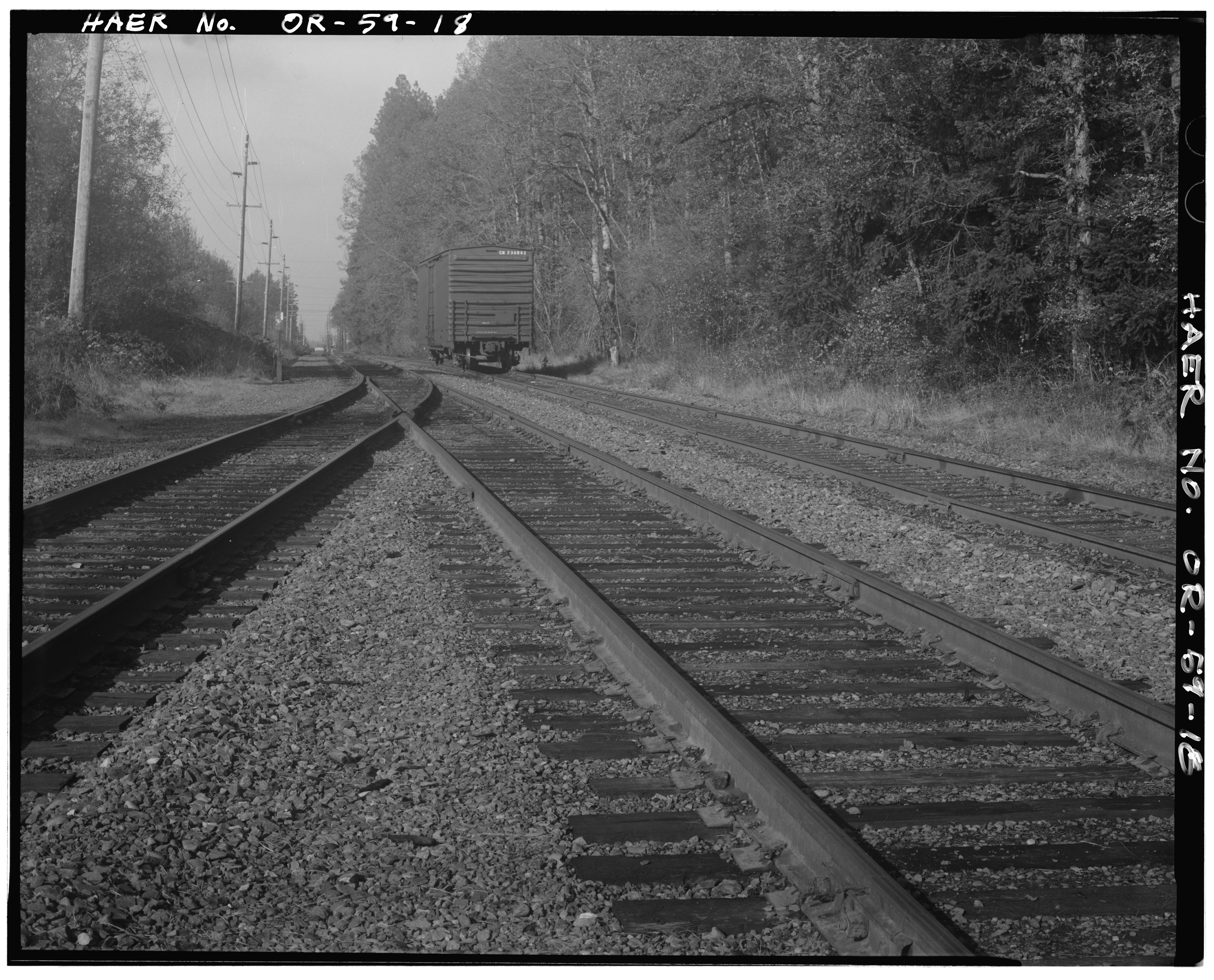
- West of Beaverton in 1992–1993, prior to the construction of the MAX Blue Line

Overview
- Status: Abandoned

Technical
- Line length: 19.1 mi (30.7 km)
- Track gauge: 1,435 mm (4 ft 8 1/2 in) standard gauge
- Electrification: 600 V DC (1908–1912); 1,200 V DC (1912–1945)

The Forest Grove branch is an abandoned railway line in the state of Oregon, in the United States. It was built by the Oregon Electric Railway and ran 19.1 miles (30.7 km) from Garden Home to Forest Grove via Beaverton and Hillsboro. The MAX Blue Line uses part of the right-of-way between Beaverton and Hillsboro.

== History ==
=== Oregon Electric ===
The Oregon Electric Railway completed the 19.1-mile (30.7 km) branch from its main line at Garden Home to Forest Grove in 1908. At the time of completion the branch, like the main line, was electrified at 600 V DC. This was converted to 1,200 V DC in 1912.

Passenger service ended on the Forest Grove branch in July 1932. Electrified freight service continued until dieselization in 1945. In 1933, the Interstate Commerce Commission blocked a proposal by the Oregon Electric Railway to extend the line further west to serve the Stimson lumber mill in Steghers, citing the parallel Southern Pacific Railroad line.

Under pressure from the city of Portland to vacate Front Avenue, the Oregon Electric filed in 1941 to abandon its original main line into the downtown, and with it the Forest Grove branch between Garden Home and Beaverton, only keeping a small spur between Beaverton and Beburg. The Oregon Electric constructed new connections to the Southern Pacific in Beaverton and Tigard and obtained trackage rights.

=== Burlington Northern ===
The Oregon Electric was merged into the new Burlington Northern Railroad in 1970. The Burlington Northern abandoned the branch between Hillsboro and Orenco in 1977. The abandonment eliminated a low overpass over East Main Street, and mile of street-running on Washington Street, in Hillsboro. BN trains served the Hillsboro–Forest Grove section via trackage rights over the Southern Pacific's Tillamook Branch.

The Burlington Northern abandoned the original right-of-way through Beaverton (including the spur to Beburg) in 1984 following the construction of a new connecting track to the Southern Pacific's parallel line. The track was built west of Beaverton, passing under the Tualatin Valley Highway.

=== Light rail ===
Discussion of what became the Westside extension of the MAX Blue Line began in 1979, and light rail was chosen as the preferred mode in 1983. As late as 1994, all light rail alternatives assumed that the line from Beaverton to Hillsboro would follow the Forest Grove branch's right-of-way, then still in use, as far as Orenco. From Orenco, it would use the abandoned right-of-way to Hillsboro. This routing would require an at-grade crossing of the Forest Grove branch near the present location of Quatama station.

In June 1994, TriMet reached an agreement with the Burlington Northern, Southern Pacific, and Union Pacific Railroad that made these arrangements unnecessary. The Burlington Northern would abandon its line from Beaverton to Orenco and reach the remaining part of the Forest Grove via trackage rights over the Southern Pacific and Union Pacific. The entire routing of Burlington Northern trains in the Portland would change, with BN trains using the Union Pacific's Steel Bridge to cross the Willamette River in downtown Portland. The new light rail line opened on September 12, 1998.

=== Portland and Western ===
In 1987–1988 the Burlington Northern attempted to divest itself of 288 miles (463 km) of branchline track in Oregon, including the Forest Grove branch. The effort stalled after legal opposition. The BNSF Railway, successor to the Burlington Northern, sold the remainder of the Forest Grove to the Portland and Western Railroad in 1997. The Portland and Western, a shortline railroad founded in 1995, had already leased a number of Southern Pacific lines in the area, including the parallel Tillamook line. Under the Portland and Western the line is known as the Forest Grove District.

In 2010, the line handled one freight movement per week. A study by the Oregon Department of Transportation stated that it was in "poor condition." The last freight movement occurred in 2015, and the Portland and Western filed to abandon in 2023. The right-of-way between Hillsboro and Forest Grove will be converted to the Council Creek Regional Trail.
