= Merlo Rd/SW 158th Ave station =

Light rail station in Beaverton, Oregon, U.S.

Merlo Rd/SW 158th Ave
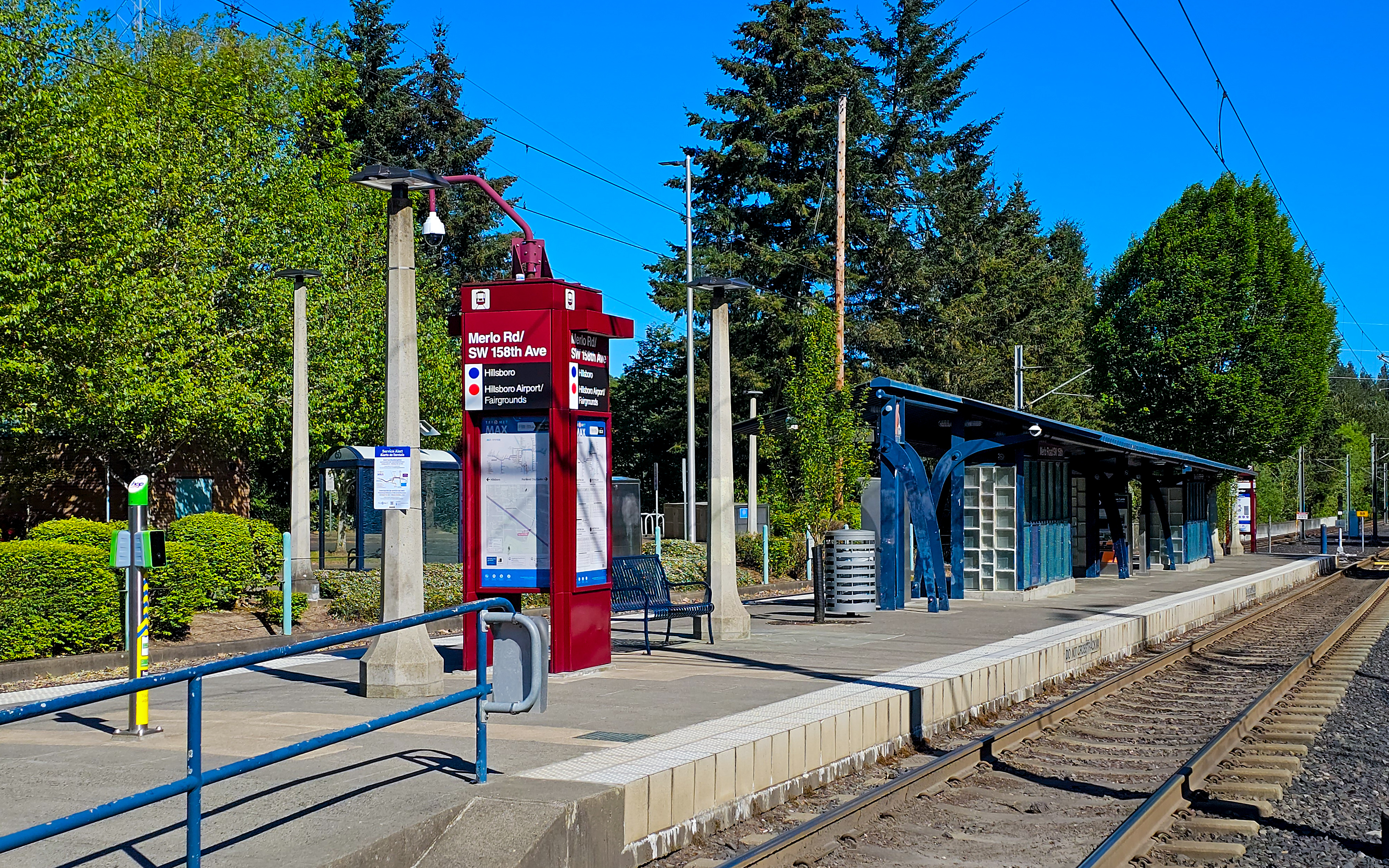

General information
- Location: Southwest Merlo Road & 158th Avenue; Beaverton, Oregon, U.S.
- Coordinates: 45°30′19″N 122°50′32″W
- Owner: TriMet
- Platforms: 1 island platform
- Tracks: 2
- Connections: TriMet: 67

Construction
- Cycle facilities: Racks and lockers
- Accessible: yes

History
- Opened: September 12, 1998

Services
Preceding station	TriMet	Following station
Elmonica/SW 170th Ave toward Hatfield Government Center	Blue Line	Beaverton Creek toward Cleveland Ave
Elmonica/SW 170th Ave toward Hillsboro Airport/Fairgrounds	Red Line	Beaverton Creek toward Portland Airport
Location

Merlo Rd/SW 158th Ave is a light rail station in Beaverton, Oregon, United States, served by TriMet as part of MAX Light Rail. It is the 10th stop westbound on the Westside MAX.

Located to the south of the station is Merlo Garage used by TriMet buses and a paved path into Tualatin Hills Nature Park. It is also the primary transit stop for students attending Merlo Station High School. It is also a short walk to the Nike World campus, and the H.M. Terpenning Recreational center. In March 2011, TriMet received a federal grant to pay for the installation of security cameras at the station.

== Bus connections ==
This station is served by the following bus line:

- 67 - Bethany/158th Avenue

== Car connections ==
There is no parking area at this station.
