= Chemawa, Oregon =

Unincorporated community in Oregon, United States

Coordinates: 45.0015084°N 122.9925959°W

Chemawa was an unincorporated community north of Salem, Oregon, in Marion County in the United States. Chemawa was also the name of a station on the Southern Pacific railroad, originally the Oregon Electric Railway. Chemawa Indian School was named after the Chemawa post office at this locale.
