= Tonquin, Oregon =

Unincorporated community in Oregon, US

Coordinates: 45.350119°N 122.793985°W

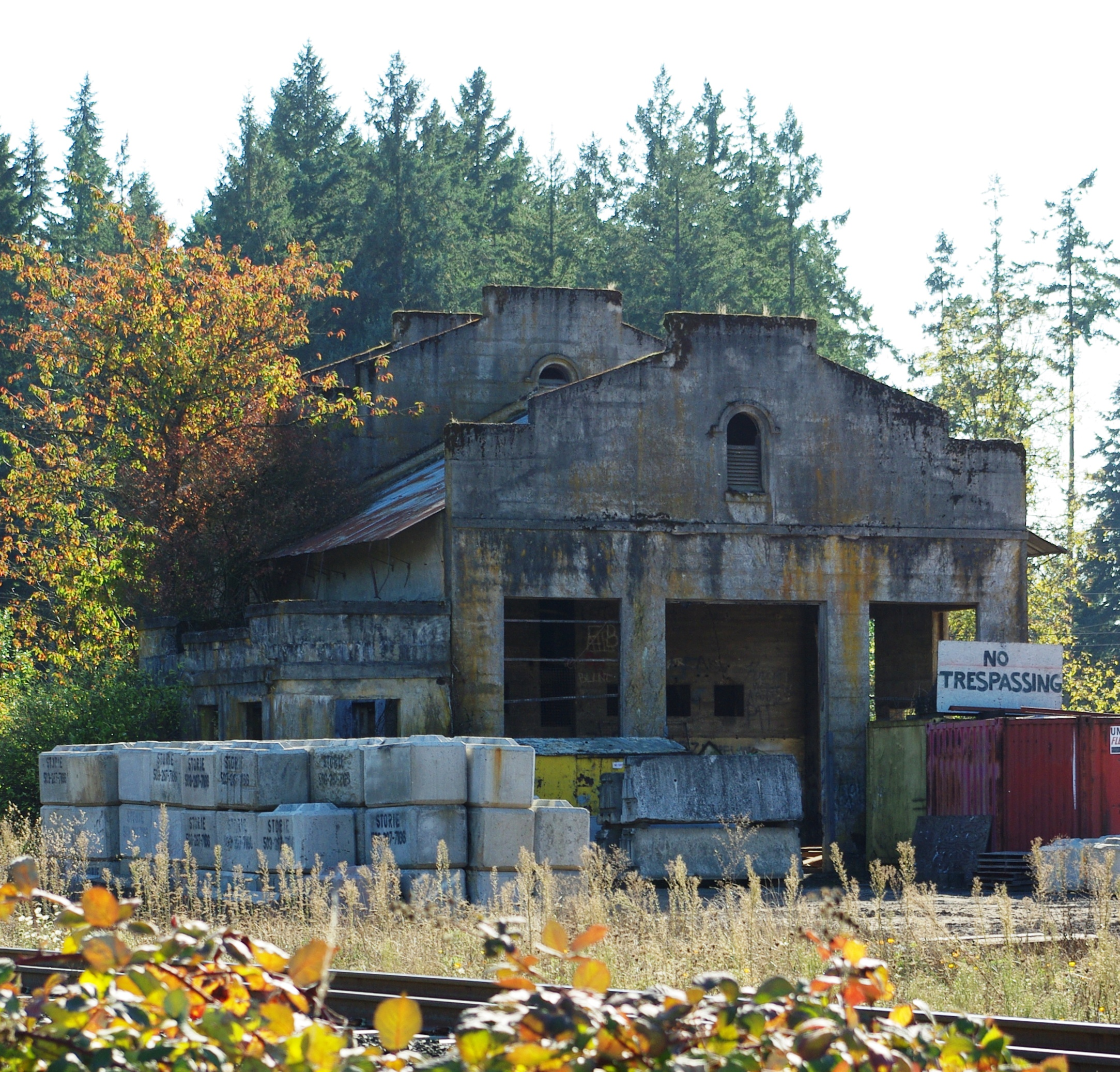
Former Oregon Electric Railway substation in Tonquin

Tonquin is an unincorporated locale in Washington County, Oregon, United States.

Tonquin was a station on the Oregon Electric Railway, named for the Pacific Fur Company ship Tonquin, because of the company's policy of naming stations for topics of historic interest to Oregonians. The station was built in 1907–08. Tonquin post office was established in 1909, and closed in 1924.

The station was 12 miles from Multnomah and 12 miles from Donald, on what is now the main line of the Portland and Western Railroad. Tonquin is on the portion of the line used by the Westside Express Service passenger train. The abandoned Oregon Electric substation/depot still exists at the site today.
