= Beaverton Creek station =

Light rail station in Beaverton, Oregon, U.S.

Beaverton Creek
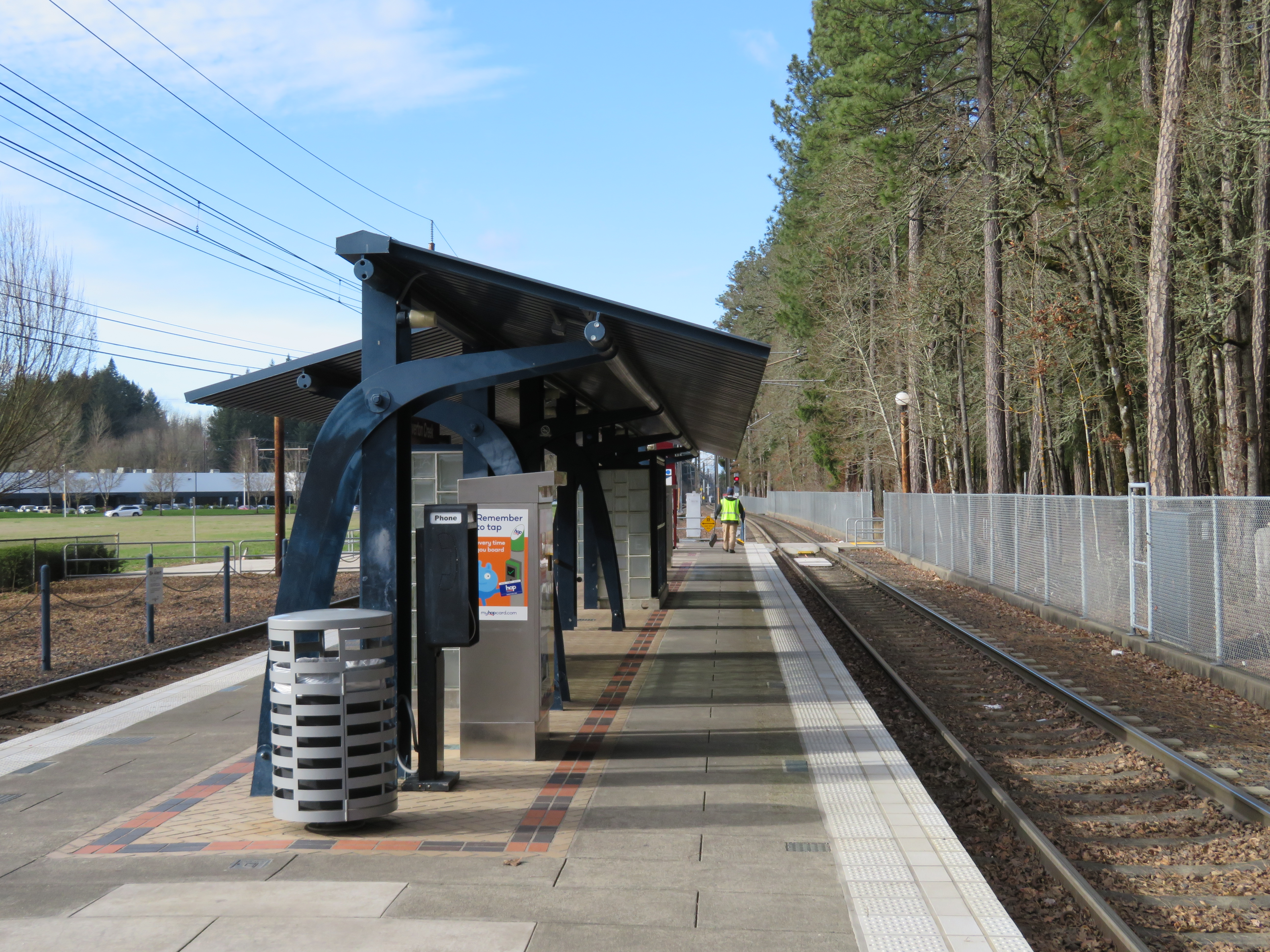
- Platform at Beaverton Creek station in 2018

General information
- Location: SW 153rd Dr, south of Jenkins; Beaverton, Oregon; USA
- Coordinates: 45°30′02″N 122°49′59″W
- Owner: TriMet
- Platforms: 1 island platform
- Tracks: 2

Construction
- Parking: 417 park and ride spaces
- Cycle facilities: Racks and lockers
- Accessible: yes

History
- Opened: September 12, 1998

Services
Preceding station	TriMet	Following station
Merlo Rd/SW 158th Ave toward Hatfield Government Center	Blue Line	Millikan Way toward Cleveland Ave
Merlo Rd/SW 158th Ave toward Hillsboro Airport/Fairgrounds	Red Line	Millikan Way toward Portland Airport
Location

Beaverton Creek is a light rail station on the MAX Blue and Red lines in Beaverton, Oregon, United States. It is the 9th stop westbound on the Westside MAX.

The station is located near parkland, which is near the Nike World Campus. Retained at the station's crosswalk to the platform are remnants of a railroad spur, once used to serve light industrial customers and to deliver MAX vehicles. Nike operates its own fleet of shuttle buses, all running on biodiesel, to its world headquarters and nearby satellite offices.

In March 2011, TriMet received a federal grant to pay for the installation of security cameras at the station.
