= Fulton Park (Portland, Oregon) =

Public park in Portland, Oregon, U.S.

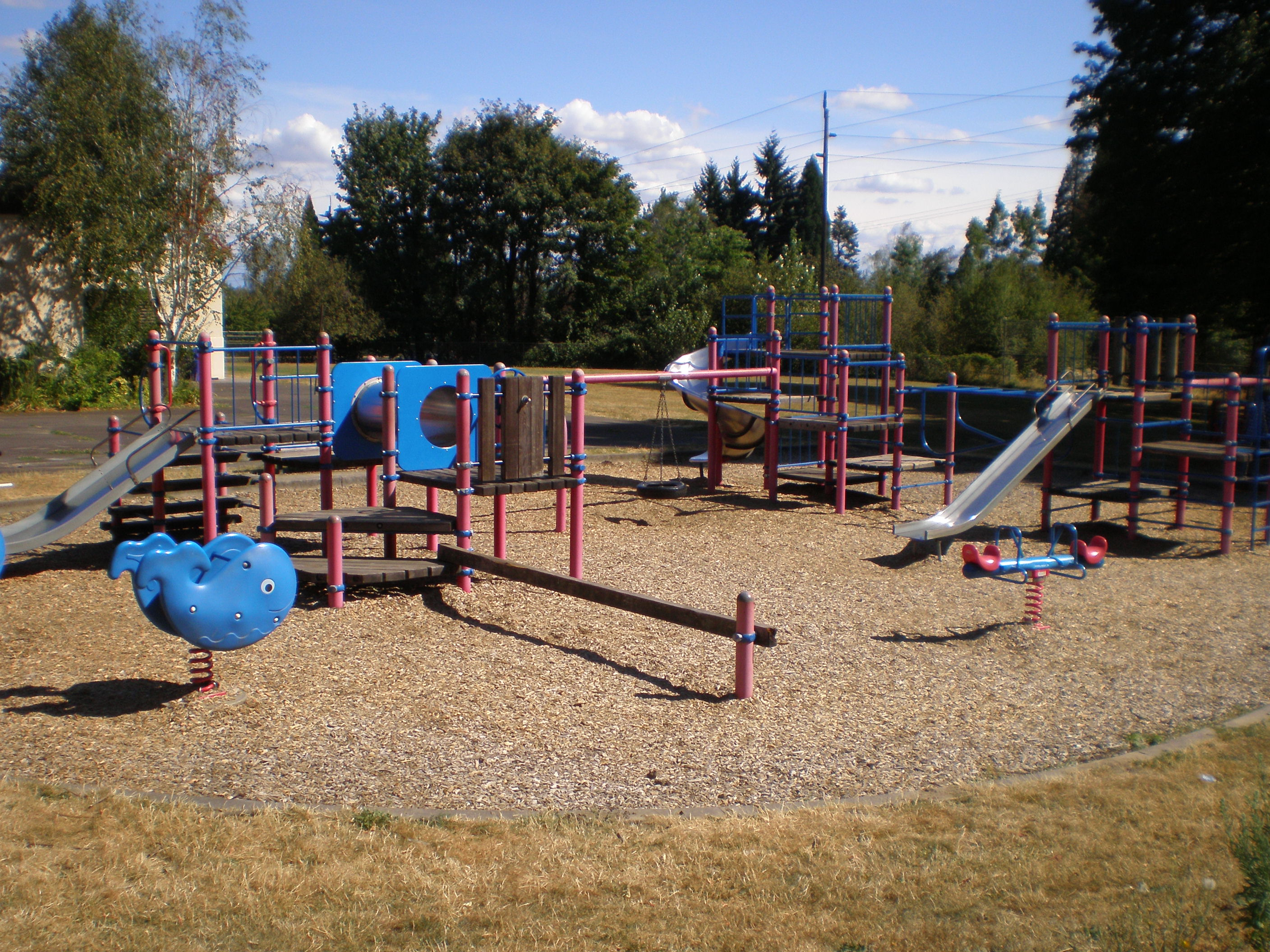
- Playground, 2010

- Location within Portland, Oregon
- Location: 68 SW Miles St. Portland, Oregon
- Coordinates: 45°28′14″N 122°40′50″W
- Area: 8.50 acres (3.44 ha)
- Operator: Portland Parks & Recreation

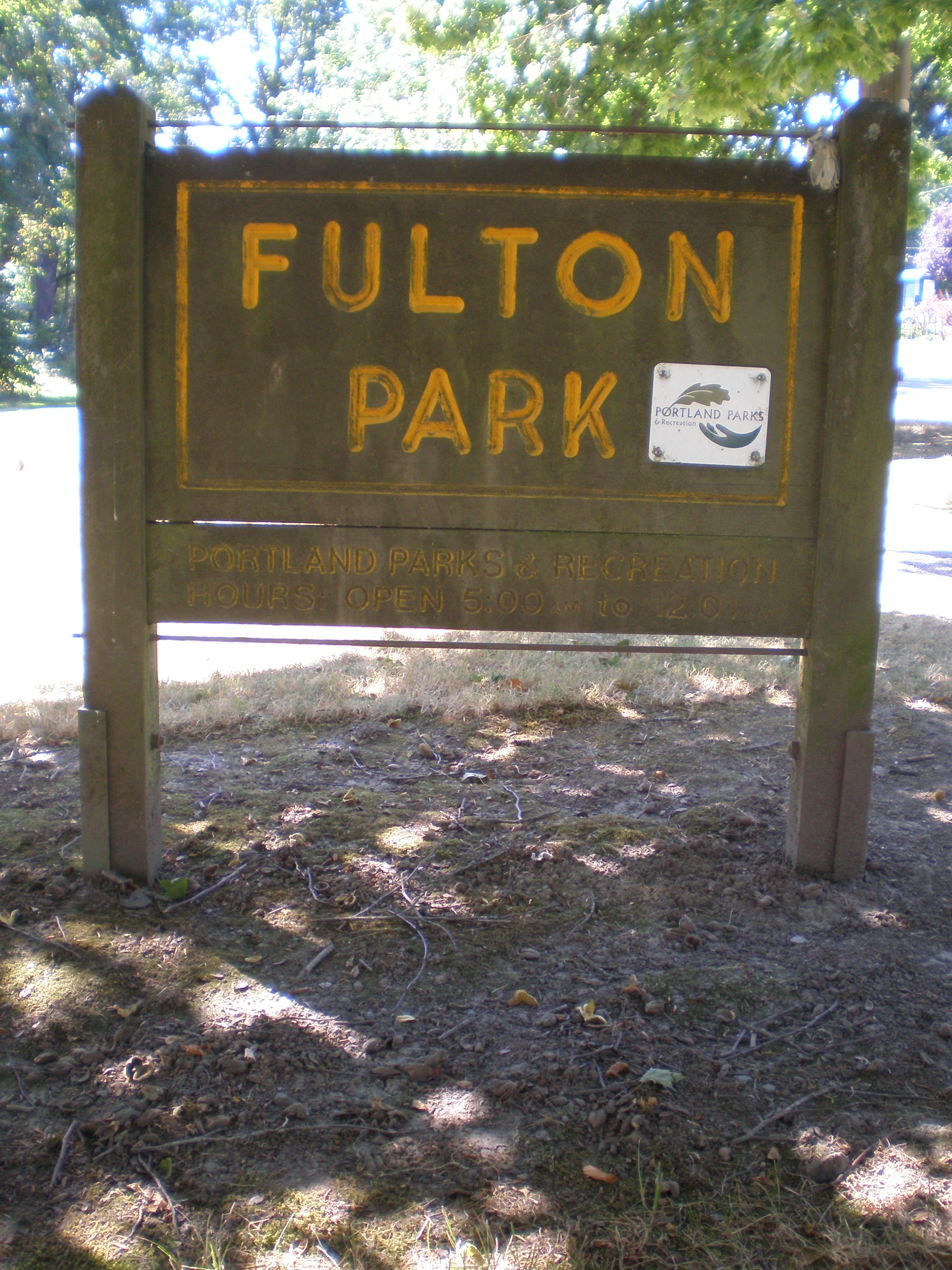
Sign, 2010

Fulton Park is an 8.5-acre (3.4 ha) public park in southwest Portland, Oregon. The space was acquired in 1941.
