= Garden Home–Whitford, Oregon =

Garden Home-Whitford, Oregon
- CDP
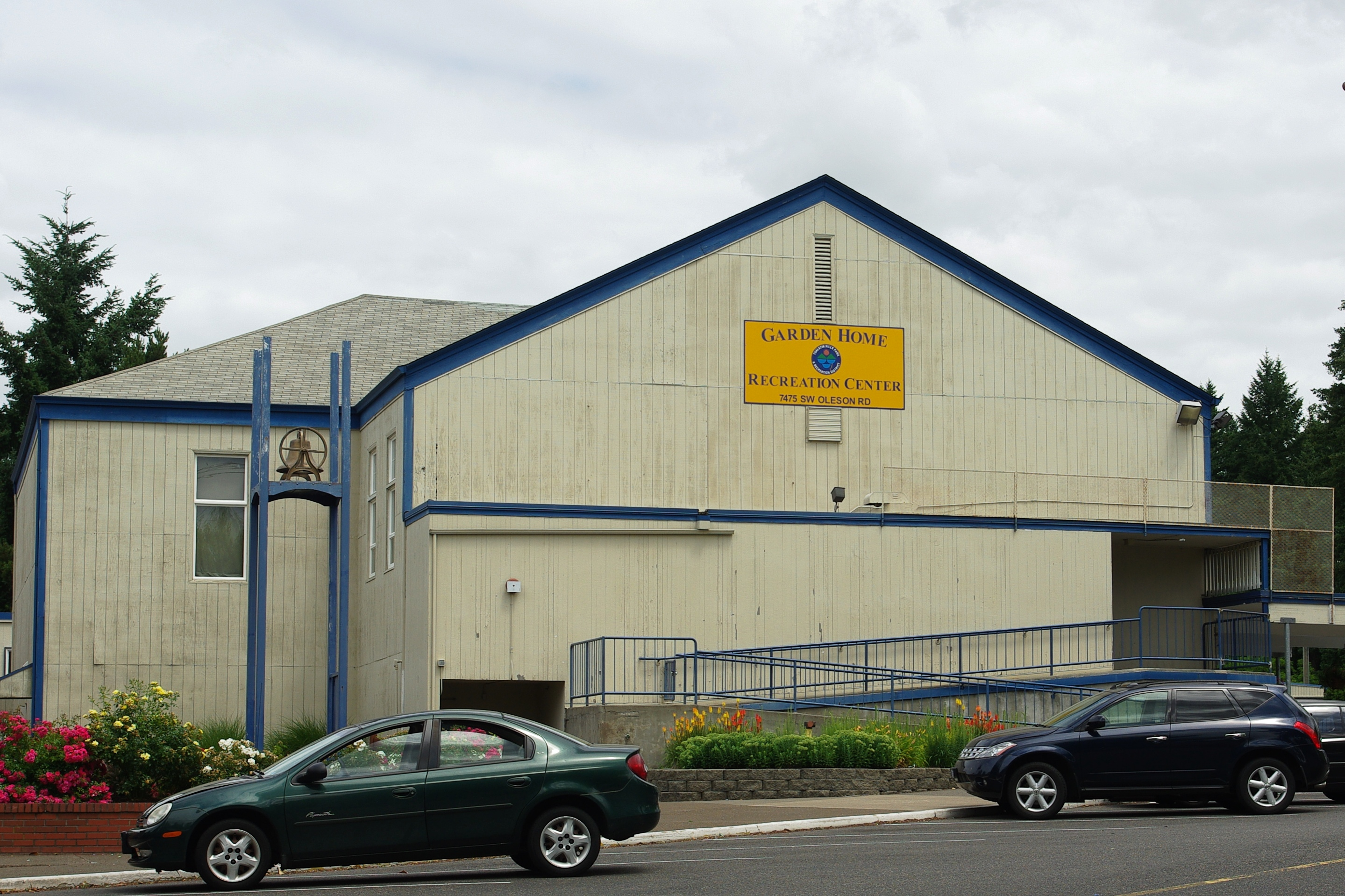
- Recreation Center in Garden Home

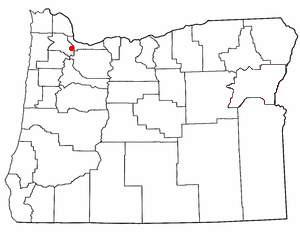
- Location of Garden Home-Whitford, Oregon
- Coordinates: 45°27′50″N 122°45′32″W
- Country: United States
- State: Oregon
- County: Washington

Area
  - Total: 1.55 sq mi (4.02 km^{2})
  - Land: 1.55 sq mi (4.01 km^{2})
  - Water: 0.0039 sq mi (0.01 km^{2})
- Elevation: 256 ft (78 m)

Population (2020)
  - Total: 7,081
  - Density: 4,571.5/sq mi (1,765.06/km^{2})
- Time zone: UTC-8 (Pacific (PST))
  - Summer (DST): UTC-7 (PDT)
- FIPS code: 41-27825
- GNIS feature ID: 2408277

Garden Home-Whitford is a census-designated place (CDP) consisting of the neighborhoods of Garden Home and the smaller Whitford area in Washington County, Oregon, United States. They are located in the southwest hills of Portland, near Beaverton. As of the 2020 census, the CDP population was 7,081.

== History ==
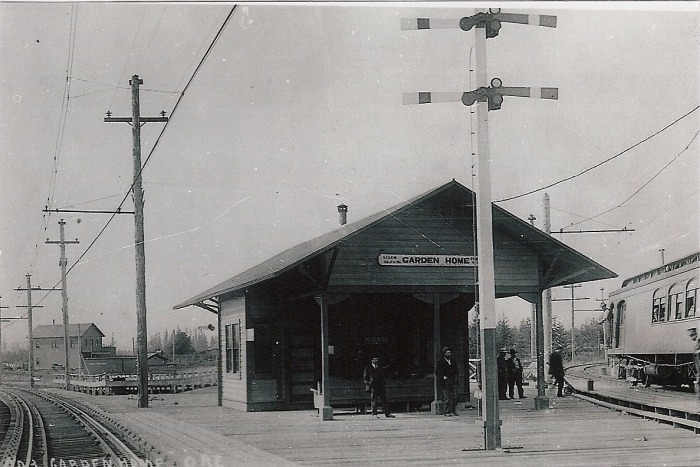
The Oregon Electric Railway's Garden Home Railway Depot c. 1911. This structure stood on a trestle at the intersection of Multnomah Blvd and Garden Home Rd. Tracks on the left continued south to Nesmith, Metzger, and Greenburg. Tracks on the right continued northwest to Firlock, Fanno Creek, Whitford, and Beaverton.

Garden Home post office was established in 1882. Garden Home was an established community when the Oregon Electric Railway was built at the beginning of the 20th century, which named a depot on the line for the community. Whitford was a station on the same line, located at the present-day intersection of Allen Road and Scholls Ferry Road (Oregon Route 210); the name was created by combining the names of W.A. White and A.C. Bedford, New York investors who were directors of the railway.

Whitford station closed when the railway stopped running circa 1920 and, unlike Garden Home, which became the name of a Portland suburb, Whitford exists today primarily as the name of a Beaverton middle school.

== Geography ==
According to the United States Census Bureau, the CDP has a total area of 1.9 square miles (4.9 km^{2}), all land.

== Demographics ==
Historical population
Census	Pop.	Note	%±
2000	6,982		—
2010	6,671		−4.5%
2020	7,081		6.1%
U.S. Decennial Census

=== 2020 Census ===
As of the 2020 census, there were 7,081 people and 3,419 households in the CDP. The racial makeup of the CDP was 80.8% White, 4.43% Asian, 1.31% African American, 0.58% Native American, 0.31% Pacific Islander, 2.37% from other races, and 10.2% from two or more races. Non-Hispanic white people made up 79.1% of the population.

There were 3,419 households, of which 17% had children under the age of 18 living with them, 42.2% were married couples living together, 28.8% had a female householder with no husband present, and 25% were never married. 22.6% of people in the CDP were aged 65 years or older. The median age was 45.8.

The median household income in the CDP was $94,382, and the median income for a family was $138,894. The poverty rate for the CDP was 6%.

=== 2000 Census ===
As of the census of 2000, there were 6,931 people, 3,048 households, and 1,834 families residing in the CDP. The population density was 3,656.9 inhabitants per square mile (1,411.9/km^{2}). There were 3,175 housing units at an average density of 1,675.2 per square mile (646.8/km^{2}). The racial makeup of the CDP was 91.79% White, 3.17% Asian, 0.75% African American, 0.40% Native American, 0.16% Pacific Islander, 0.72% from other races, and 3.00% from two or more races. Hispanic or Latino people of any race were 3.20% of the population.

There were 3,048 households, out of which 26.3% had children under the age of 18 living with them, 47.8% were married couples living together, 9.3% had a female householder with no husband present, and 39.8% were non-families. 30.6% of all households were made up of individuals, and 7.2% had someone living alone who was 65 years of age or older. The average household size was 2.26 and the average family size was 2.83. The population in the CDP is spread out, with 21.1% under the age of 18, 6.5% from 18 to 24, 31.6% from 25 to 44, 27.7% from 45 to 64, and 13.1% who were 65 years of age or older. The median age was 40 years. For every 100 females there were 92.1 males. For every 100 females age 18 and over, there were 89.5 males.

The median income for a household in the CDP was $52,321, and the median income for a family was $60,703. Males had a median income of $45,220 versus $35,000 for females. The per capita income for the CDP was $28,681. About 2.5% of families and 5.1% of the population were below the poverty line, including 4.5% of those under age 18 and 2.7% of those age 65 or over.

== Government ==
Fire protection and EMS services are provided by Tualatin Valley Fire and Rescue.

== Education ==
It is in the Beaverton School District 48J.
