= Beaverton Academy of Science and Engineering =

Public school in Beaverton, Oregon, U.S.

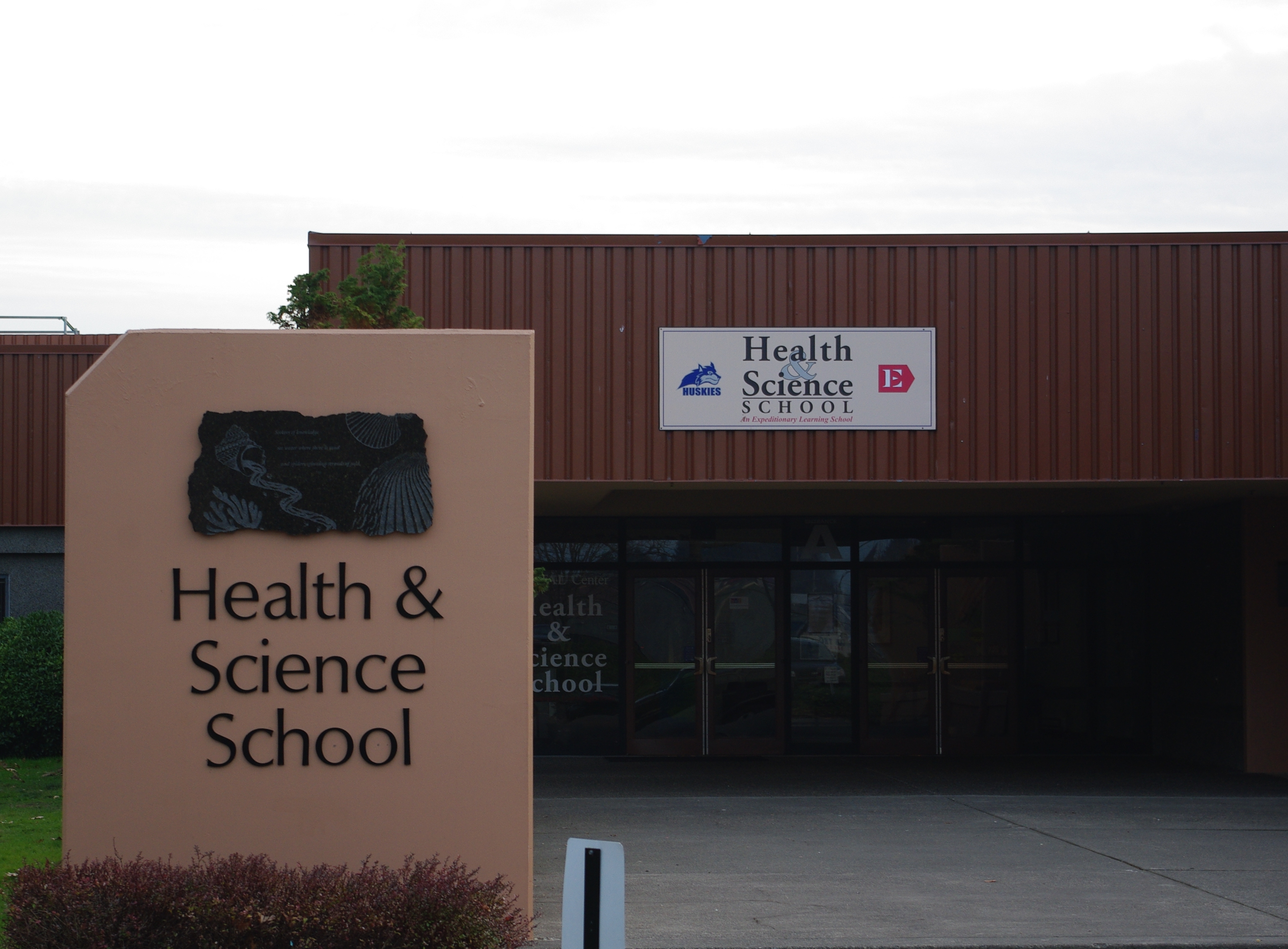

Location
- 10740 NE Walker Road; Hillsboro, (Washington County), Oregon 97006; United States; 45.5273°N 122.86984°W

Information
- Type: Public
- Opened: 2020; 6 years ago (as BASE)
- School district: Beaverton School District
- Principal: Diane Fitzpatrick
- Staff: 40.63 (FTE)
- Grades: 6–12
- Enrollment: 852 (2024-25)
- Student to teacher ratio: 20.97
- Campus: Capital Center
- Campus type: Suburban
- Colors: Blue, Gold
- Mascot: Phoenix (Formerly the Husky as voted on by the 2011 Graduating Class, the first Graduating Class of the original school)
- Website: base.beaverton.k12.or.us

The Beaverton Academy of Science and Engineering (BASE) is a public school located in Hillsboro, Oregon, United States. Part of the Beaverton School District (BSD), the school offers grades 6 through 12. Opened in 2007, the school was housed in the Capital Center at NE 185th Avenue and Walker Road in Hillsboro, then named the Health and Science School (HS2). Being an Expeditionary Learning School, the school thoroughly incorporates the principals of Expeditionary Learning through programs like CREW. The school hosts a HOSA-Future Health Professionals chapter.

== History ==
=== Start ===
The school opened in September 2007 with 120 students in ninth grade as an option program, intending to add students each year until it included grades six through twelve. In January 2008, the district purchased the Capital Center from Portland Community College and the Oregon University System for $15 million to serve as the home for the Health & Science School. Plans called for an additional $6 million to be spent remodeling the center for use by the school. The Capital Center was previously a campus of Tektronix that was sold in 1995 to a consortium of local public education entities with plans that included using part of it for a regional high school.

=== 2008–2011 ===
In 2008, the school was one of six district schools that failed to provide enough class time to meet a state mandate.

Also in 2011, the school was rated as needing improvement by the state after it failed to hold some state mandated tests.

=== 2011 arson ===
On April 26, 2011, Beaverton Academy of Science and Engineering (then Health & Science School) suffered a fire in the student girls' bathroom. According to the Oregonian, the fire was an arson and was started by 2 14-year-old girls and 1 15-year-old girl, who started the fire with a paper towel and a match in the bathroom's trash can, reportedly to get out of class. These students were later arrested after they admitted to starting the fire, but were later released but referred to the Washington County Juvenile Department. The fire cost $22,000 in damage, and all three perpetrators were expelled.

=== 2012–2013 ===
The school was identified as one of several schools that would take students with the closure of Terra Nova High School in 2012.

Female students participated in the Hermanas Conference sponsored by Intel Corporation in February 2013.

=== 2016–2019 ===
In 2016, the School of Science and Technology (SST), an accredited high school initially located beside Merlo High School, moved next door to the Health and Science school to occupy the 2 left-most side halls of the campus. Student attending classes at SST had the option of taking crossover classes with HS2.

In 2019, it was decided by the district that due to limited budgeting, SST and HS2 would merge to become one entity known as the Beaverton Academy of Science and Engineering, thus making the 2019-2020 school-year the last year that the two schools would be officially separate entities. From 2020 to 2021 and onward, the school was officially recognized as BASE, dawning new colors, blue and gold, and a new mascot, a Phoenix.

== Academics ==
Beaverton Academy of Science and Engineering is an option school; students opt out of their neighborhood school and are entered into a lottery for one of the limited spots at the school. As of the 2022-2023 school year it had an on time graduation rating of 100% from the state. Enrollment for the 2022 to 2023 school year was 811 students.

The high school adheres to a rigorous dual credit program that is incorporated into the Expeditionary Learning curriculum. Students have the opportunity to earn college credit in math, biomedical science, engineering, foreign language and science courses through OIT (Oregon Institute of Technology), PCC (Portland Community College) and PSU (Portland State University).
