= Boxer Ramen =

Chain of ramen restaurants in the U.S. state of Oregon

Boxer
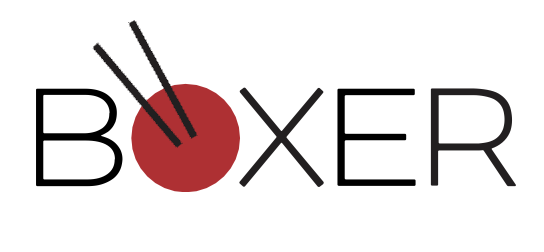

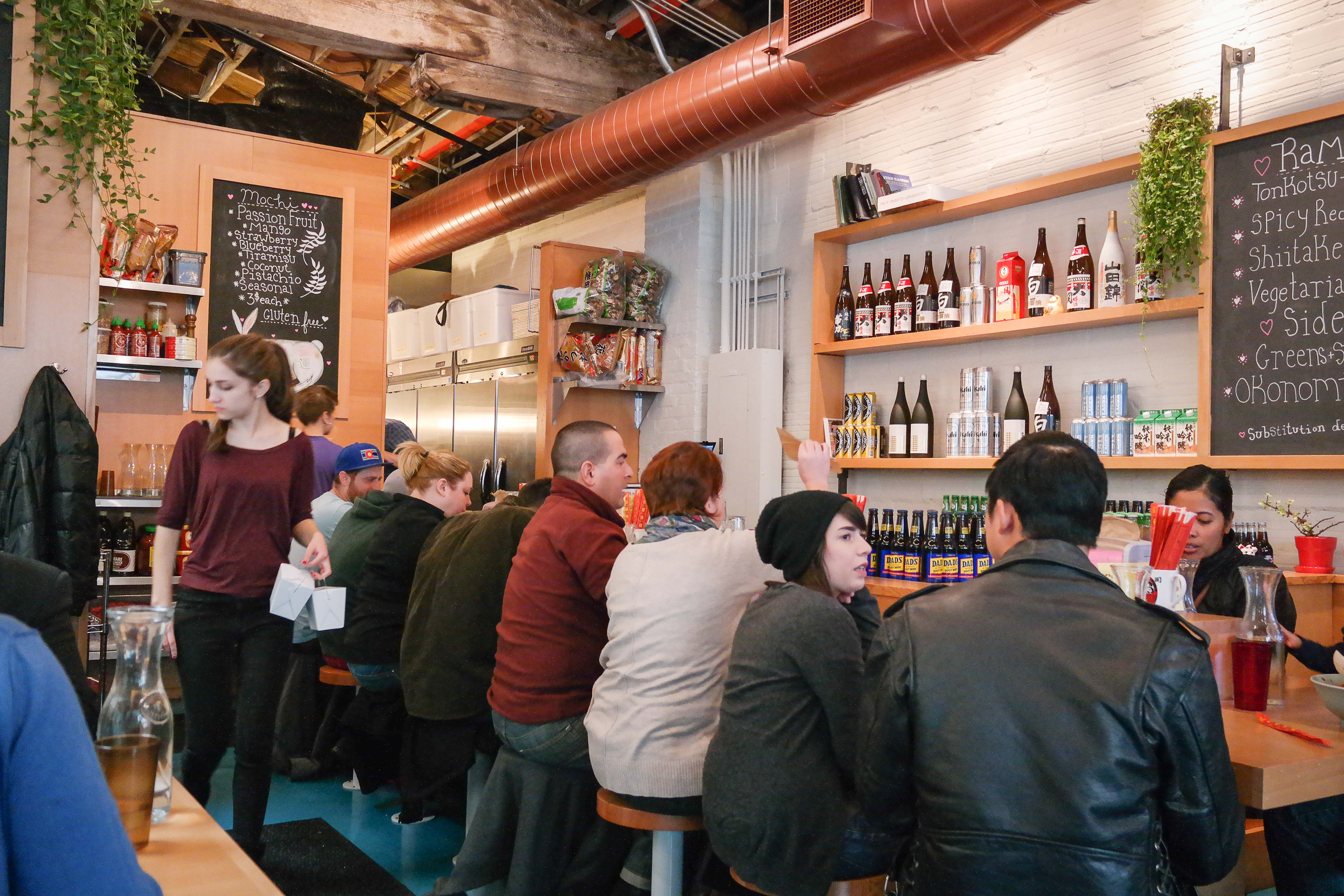
- Guests dining in the original Boxer Ramen restaurant in January 2014
- Interactive map of Boxer

Restaurant information
- Established: November 1, 2013; 13 years ago
- Closed: April 28, 2024; 2 years ago
- Owners: Micah Camden; Katie Poppe; Matt Lynch; Chris Thornton
- Food type: Japanese (ramen)
- Location: Portland; Beaverton, Oregon, United States
- Website: boxerramen.com

Boxer (originally Boxer Ramen) was a small chain of ramen restaurants in the Portland, Oregon metropolitan area, in the United States. Micah Camden and Katie Poppe opened the original 30-seat Boxer Raman in downtown Portland in 2013, followed by a second in January 2015. Matt Lynch and Chris Thornton later joined as partners. Boxer Ramen opened third, fourth, and fifth locations in 2016, 2017, and 2018, respectively.

All of the restaurants closed temporarily in 2020 as a result of the COVID-19 pandemic. Two of the outposts were converted into other restaurants operated in part by Camden, and two reopened in 2022 and were rebranded as Boxer. A third Boxer opened in Beaverton's Cedar Hills Crossing in December 2022. The company declared Chapter 11 bankruptcy in February 2024. In April, Camden announced plans to close all restaurants permanently after service on April 28.

== Description ==
Boxer (originally Boxer Ramen) was a small chain of fast casual restaurants in the Portland metropolitan area. The original 30-seat ramen shop was located in Union Way, a multi-use retail "alleyway project" in the space formerly occupied by Red Cap Garage, in downtown Portland's West End. It was described as a "sister restaurant" to Boxer Sushi, opened by Micah Camden in southeast Portland's Hawthorne district in 2012 and closed in September 2014. Portland Monthly said of the original location's atmosphere and interior: "Micah Camden's neo-pop noodle house looks like a ramen shop designed by Lucky Peach magazine. Wu-Tang Clan bumps from the sound system and an entire wall is clad in a mural of three cute but devilish Japanese girls hovering over a chicken, pig, or tuna leaping from a ramen bowl."

Three additional locations opened. Their interiors featured pop art decor. The restaurant on Alberta Street features "utilitarian plywood decor" and umbrellas hanging from the ceiling, an alley spray-painted gold, and a mural described as "drawings of animal-people eating bowls of animal-people, like an anime episode of BoJack Horseman". Alexander Basek of Food & Wine said of the interior: "Boxer's generous use of hot pink and unfinished plywood for decor bestows Boxer's small interior with a work-in-progress vibe."

The original restaurant accepted cash only and did not offer take-out containers, as of 2013.

=== Menu ===
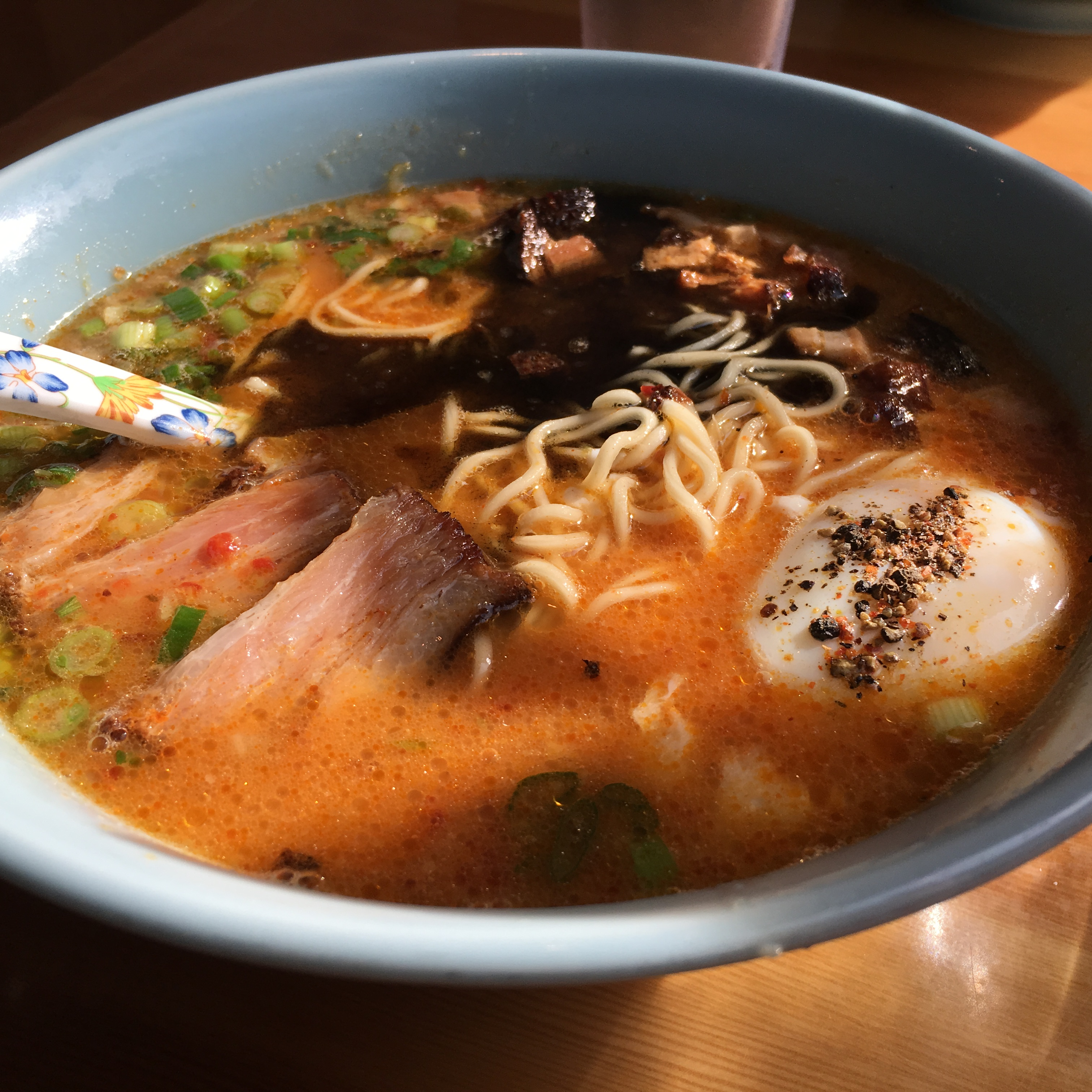
Spicy Red Miso Ramen

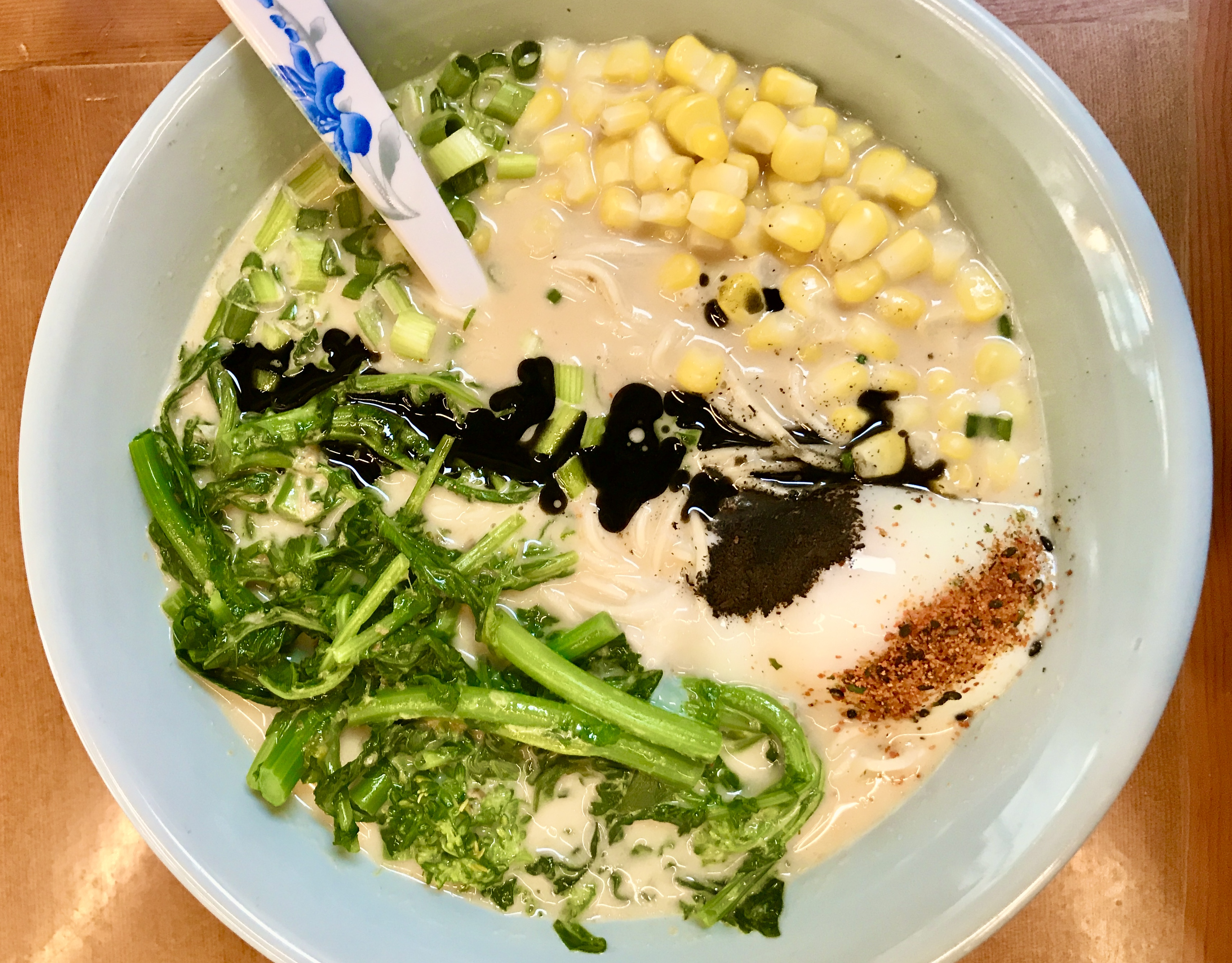
Vegetarian Yellow Curry Ramen

When it opened, Boxer Ramen's menu featured noodle soups with noodles made by Sun Noodle Company and two types of broth: spicy miso and tonkotsu-shoyu. Within a year, two additional ramen options were added: shiitake, featuring a mushroom-pork bone dashi, and vegetarian yellow curry, with coconut milk, corn, stock, and tofu. Other soup ingredients included pork belly, scallions, and soft poached eggs. Rotating side dishes included Japanese pickles, ohitashi spinach salads, okonomiyaki tater tots, pork belly buns and pot stickers. Mochi ice cream shipped from Bubbies in Honolulu was available for dessert; flavors included passion fruit. The fourth Boxer Ramen location added a bowl with short ribs to the menu, along with cocktails, including a Moscow mule and yuzu-infused gin and tonic.

== History ==
=== Original restaurant ===
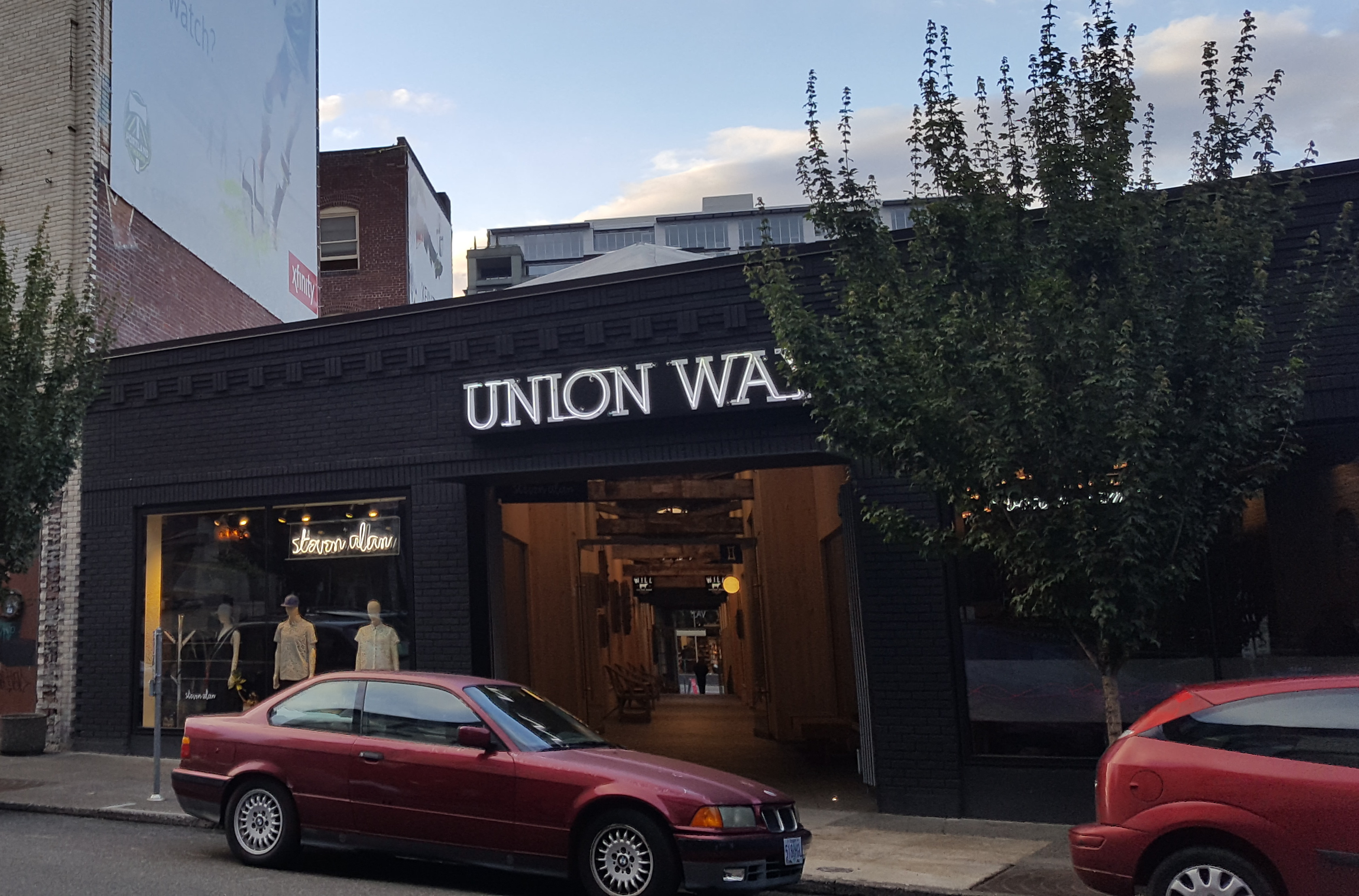
The southern entrance to Union Way, which housed the original Boxer Ramen restaurant, in 2016

Micah Camden announced plans to open Boxer Ramen in April 2013. In August, he and co-owner Katie Poppe confirmed plans to open in late September, but there were some delays while the restaurant offered "soft openings" and "test dinners". October 9 was later announced as the opening date, but this was pushed back to November 1. Boxer Ramen hosted a "ramen free-for-all" on October 31, offering guests bowls at no cost from noon to 3:00 pm. The restaurant celebrated its first anniversary by offering half-price bowls from noon to 9:00 pm on November 1, 2014.

=== Subsequent locations ===
Boxer Ramen opened a second location in northeast Portland's Vernon neighborhood, at the intersection of 21st Avenue and Albert Street in the Alberta Arts District, in January 2015. Camden and Poppe had applied for a liquor license by November 2014. The opening kicked off with a ramen bowl giveaway on January 22, and the restaurant initially operated from noon to 10:00 pm. It closed at 9:00 pm on all evenings, as of 2016.

The soft launch for the third restaurant, housed in a space previously occupied by the Two Tarts Bakery at the intersection of Northwest 23rd Avenue and Kearney Street, in the city's Northwest District, was held on March 25, 2016. Camden and Poppe had applied for a liquor license for the restaurant by November 2015, and were joined by new co-owner Matt Lynch. Similar to the promotional giveaway for the original location, Boxer Ramen offered free ramen bowls on site from 4:00 pm–7:00 pm. The Northwest District restaurant has a 28-seat dining area with an additional 8-seat counter. It offers a similar menu as the first two locations, operating from noon–9:00 pm on weekdays and from 11:00 am to 9:00 pm on weekends, as of 2016.

The trio opened a fourth location along East Burnside Street on December 1, 2017, slightly later than the previously announced opening date of October 15. Boxer Ramen hosted a similar on-site ramen giveaway on November 30. The 40-seat restaurant had a slightly expanded menu, cocktails, and happy hour from 10:00 m to midnight on Thursdays, Fridays, and Saturdays. The restaurant was the largest of the Boxer Ramen locations.

Plans for a fifth location in the Westmoreland, district of southeast Portland's Sellwood-Moreland neighborhood were confirmed in 2018. In January 2018, Portland Mercury said construction had recently begun on the 32-seat restaurant and anticipated a start by the summer season.

Boxer Ramen supported Family Meal, a nonprofit organization supporting "food service and agricultural workers in need in a medical debt crisis", as of 2019. In addition to Camden, Poppe, and Lynch, Chris Thornton was named a co-owner of Boxer Ramen in 2020.

=== COVID-19 pandemic, rebrand, and closure ===
Former logo of Boxer Ramen

When the COVID-19 pandemic prompted Governor Kate Brown to close indoor dining, Camden gave teams at all restaurants the choice of temporary closure or continuing as a take-out service. The Boxer Ramen teams elected to pause operations altogether. In September 2020, Camden said of the closures: "Boxer Ramen has always been one of my favorite restaurants. I have five locations. But nobody in the world orders ramen to go." The Burnside location had closed by August, and was converted into Rock Paper Fish, a seafood chain by Camden, Craig Peterson, and Ndamukong Suh. By July, the Sellwood restaurant was converted into a second location for Baes Fried Chicken, a fried chicken operation by Camden with Suh. Some Boxer Ramen staff continued to work at the satellite Baes, and new employees were hired as well.

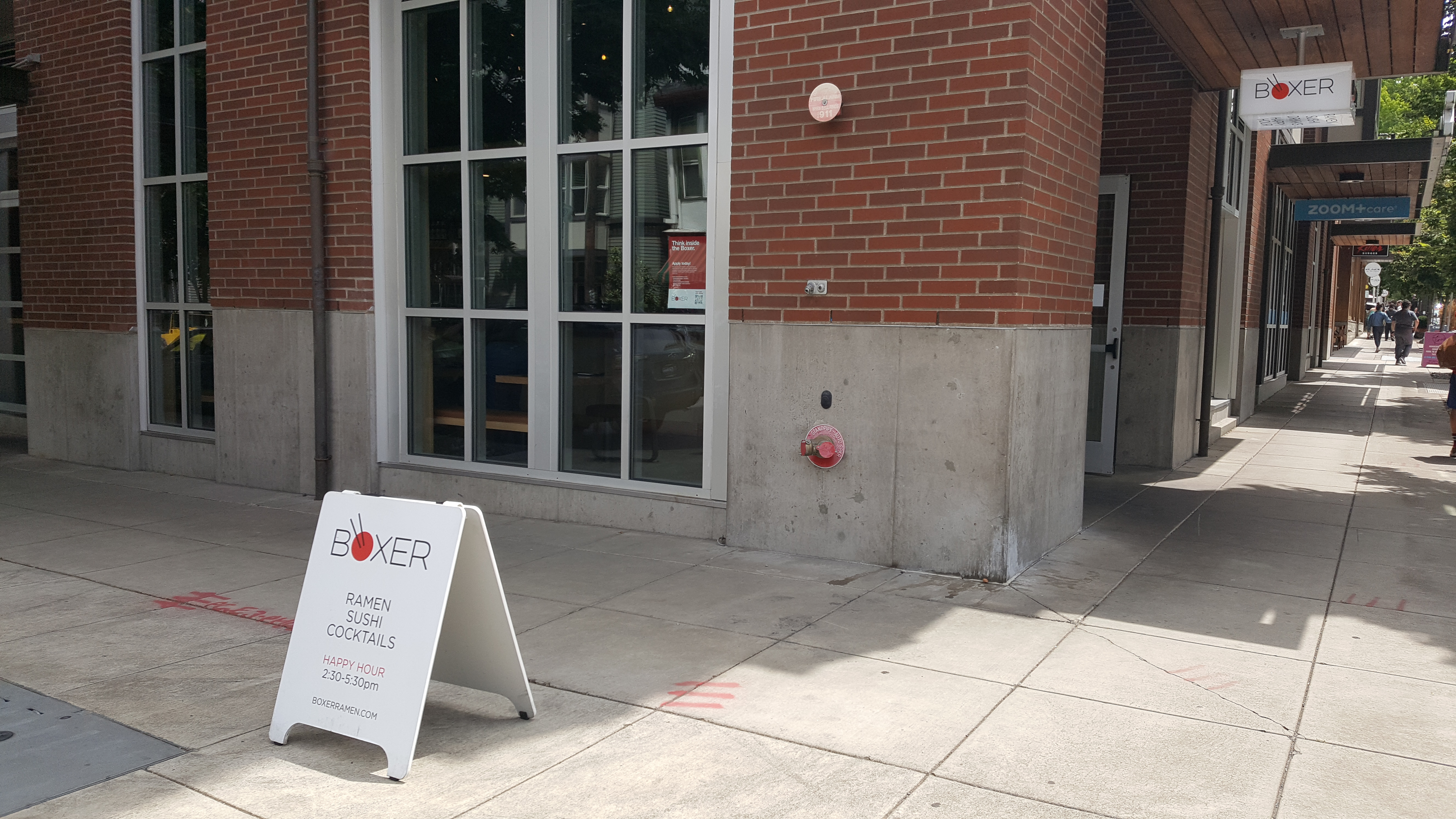
Exterior of the restaurant in the Northwest District in July 2022, rebranded as simply Boxer

In 2022, the Northwest District restaurant reopened at a new location in the Slabtown area. It and the Alberta location were rebranded as simply Boxer. The Slabtown restaurant's menu was expanded to include serving sushi, sashimi, sake, and cocktails. A third Boxer opened at Cedar Hills Crossing, in Beaverton, on December 2, 2023. The outpost's expanded menu includes bento boxes with teriyaki chicken, ahi tuna poke, pork katsu, and kalbi teriyaki. Drinks include saki, craft beer, Orion, and teas.

In February 2024, Boxer declared Chapter 11 bankruptcy, citing heavy debt caused from the COVID-19 pandemic. Two months later, Camden announced plans to close all Boxer restaurants permanently after service on April 28, citing the pandemic and inflation as reasons. In August 2024, a group of Boxer employees announced plans to launch Fat Kitty Ramen in two former Boxer locations. An outpost of the California-based gluten-free bakery Kirari West later operated in the space that had housed the 23rd Avenue location.

== Reception ==
Following the opening of the original restaurant, Michael Russell of The Oregonian gave Boxer Ramen a "B" rating and called the restaurant a "small step forward" for the city's ramen scene. He described the tonkotsu broth as "a salty Japanese carbonara" and deemed the dish Portland's best ramen. Russell also called the okonomiyaki tater tots a "cross-cultural stroke of genius". He later included Boxer in the newspaper's list of the 21 "most painful" restaurant and bar closures of 2024. Willamette Week's Martin Cizmar said Boxer Ramen "delivers quick, hard jabs" and called the restaurant Camden's "greatest creation yet" (in addition to Boxer Sushi, his other projects have included Blue Star Donuts and Little Big Burger). Portland Monthly said the spicy red miso ramen "has addictive potential" and recommends the passion fruit mochi, described as "creamy and softly fruity, a Dreamsicle reborn".

The Oregonian's Samantha Bakall wrote, "The hip, Southwest Portland ramen-ya is known for its tonkotsu broth, arguably the best in Portland right now. Boxer was one of our favorite ramen shops of 2014." She also included Boxer Ramen in her 2014 list of "50 great Portland-area restaurants where you and a friend can chow down -- and maybe even have a drink -- for under $50". In his review, Ben Waterhouse recommended the pork-bone, shoyu, and tonkotsu broths, and wrote, "nowhere in town offers a bowl more like that you're likely to find after a long night of drinking in Shibuya".

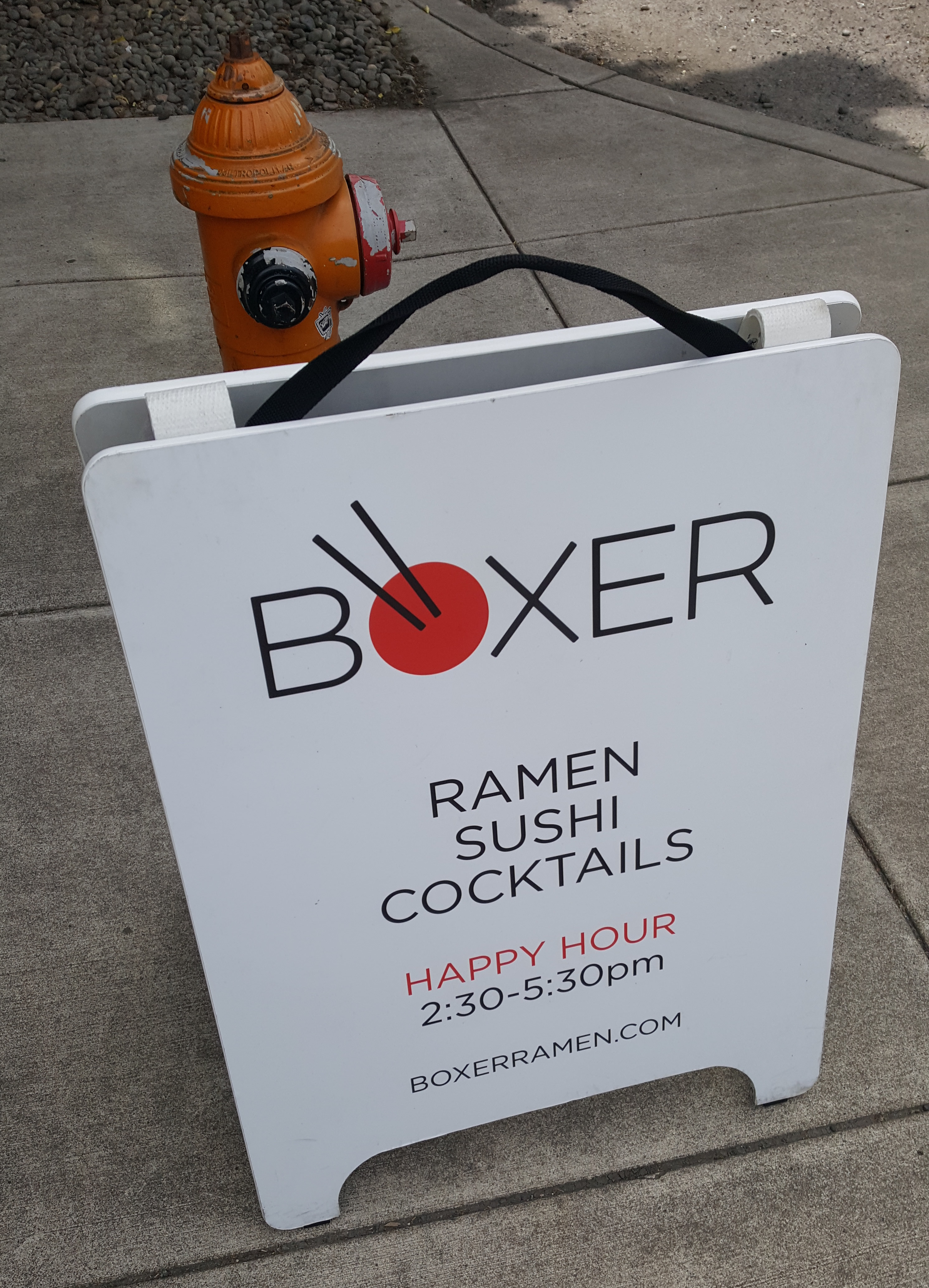
Sign for Boxer, following the restaurant's rebranding

Chris Onstad of the Portland Mercury recommended the tonkotsu-shio ramen in his 2014 review, and complimented the service staff for being "quick, remarkably knowledgable, and friendly to the point of actual charm". He did, however, criticize the restaurant for accepting cash only, and wrote:

It is claimed the noodles are brought in from a vaunted purveyor, but I would still like them to be a little more toothsome when first set down. If the same noodle is going to be used in all four dishes, as it is here, it deserves finer tuning. Quantity-wise, I always felt like I ran out three bites shy of satisfaction.

In 2016, Willamette Week staff recommended the Northwest District restaurant during neighborhood visits, and Aaron Mesh questioned the Alberta restaurant's relatively early closing time. He wrote, "The puzzling part of a high-gloss take on the Tokyo ramen counter is that it closes at 9 pm. The starter menu ... would be impossibly popular at last call." Furthermore, he opined, "Camden's little big touches remain deft, even as he makes Portland look increasingly like a cartoon." The newspaper's Elise Herron ranked Boxer Ramen number six in her 2019 list of the "seven best places to get tots" in Portland, and wrote, "Seafood lovers will appreciate the fish flake-topped tots with sides of tonkatsu and creamy-spicy sauce." Boxer Ramen won in the "best ramen" category in Willamette Week's annual 'Best of Portland' readers' poll in 2016, and was runner-up in 2017, 2020, and 2022. Portland Mercury's Jenni Moore wrote in 2019, "Boxer Ramen's cool little space on Alberta has purposely exposed-but-glossed-over plywood walls, some pleasant mural art, and an only slightly alarming taxidermy raccoon riding in a canoe... They get extra points for bumping rap from the likes of Big K.R.I.T. and 2Pac, because yes, hip-hop does make my plant-based ramen more enjoyable."

Fodor's has described the original location as "often crowded and convivial", and Thrillist said: "This place is all about creating a dish, executing it well, and selling it for a decent price in a good environment. Nestled at the front end of Union Way plaza, this place has been the best place to get ramen in Downtown since its opening, and a great place to stop for post-shopping lunch." Zagat gives Delta ratings of 4.0 for food, 3.9 for decor, and 4.0 for service, each on a scale of 5. The guide said, "Fans find extreme umami at these no-nonsense Japanese from Micah Camden ... that offer a simple menu of great, rich ramen plus a few side dishes; the compact spaces are not a place to go with groups, but speedy, solicitous service ensures a noodle-icious experience that hits the spot."

== See also ==
- List of casual dining restaurant chains
- List of Japanese restaurants
- List of noodle restaurants
- List of restaurant chains in the United States
