= Charles E. Bernard =

American aviation pioneer

- Born: July 29, 1893; Beaverton, Oregon, United States
- Died: October 7, 1979 (aged 86); Oregon, U.S.
- Other name: Charlie Bernard
- Occupations: Aviator, businessman
- Known for: Bernard's Airport
- Spouse: Vivian (m. 1919–79)

Charles E. Bernard (July 29, 1893 – October 7, 1979) was an American aviation pioneer who developed Bernard's Airport, in Beaverton, Oregon, United States.

== Early life and work ==
Charles Bernard was born in 1893 in Beaverton, Oregon. He lived on his family's hay farm in Beaverton, on land that amounted to 60 acres (24 hectares) at least as early as the mid-1920s. He developed an interest in aviation as a teenager. In the mid-1910s, he became friends with some students at the Adcox School of Aviation, in Portland, and after learning that they were assembling an experimental glider, he invited them to his family's hayfield for test flights in which a galloping horse would launch the glider for flights of up to a thousand feet. Bernard's father had been unaware of these activities, which he considered immature and not good preparation for any career, and when he learned of them in 1916, he put a stop to them; the glider strip closed. Bernard finished school and began working as an automobile salesman. He opened a Chevrolet dealership that year, with Elmer Stipe. Until his father's death in 1928, Bernard kept his interest in aviation to himself.

== Airport development ==
About one-half mile to the south of the Bernard farm, an airfield known as Watts Field was opened around 1926 on the 33-acre (13 ha) former site of Premium Picture Productions (1922–25). Beaverton's second airfield began to take shape in 1928, as Charles Bernard erected the first hangar along what is now Cedar Hills Blvd. (then Cedar Street), to the northwest of the center of Beaverton. As Watts Field began to run out of space for expansion, the nearby field that had come to be known as Bernard's Airport grew. In 1932, Watts Airport was still the larger of the two, occupying 60 acres (24 ha) of land, with 10 airplanes based there (and room for 40 aircraft), and was the third-busiest of nine airports then operating in the Portland metropolitan area, while Bernard's Airport occupied 30 acres (12 ha) and had only three aircraft based there at that time. Both were privately owned, non-commercial airports.

Bernard's Airport and Watts Airport were still in operation concurrently in 1935, but Watts Airport closed not long afterwards, leading to considerable expansion at the Bernard airfield. The Oregonian of September 11, 1938, stated that Bernard Airport was "perhaps the busiest non-commercial airport in the United States". By 1955, it had 44 wooden hangars, along with numerous open sheds (or "'plane-ports") capable of housing more than 100 additional light aircraft.

A large area to the north of Charles "Charlie" Bernard's property was developed between 1946 and 1955 as the Cedar Hills residential area. In 1963, Bernard considered selling his then-60-acre (24 ha) property for redevelopment as housing, after his airport began to lose money, a change he attributed to a big increase in his property taxes. Bernard was still living nearby at the time, in his family's old farmhouse on Walker Road. He decided against selling at that time.

In January 1969, Bernard announced that he had leased his 60 acres (24 ha), including the 40 acres of airport property, to a group of developers and that the airport would close, to be replaced by a new shopping mall. Bernard's Airport closed in February 1969, and the Beaverton Mall was developed on the airport site. The shopping center was originally named "Bernard's Beaverton Mall" (and referred to as "Bernard Mall", for short), after the local aviation pioneer who still owned the property.

== Personal ==
In February 1919, Charles Bernard married Vivian O'Connor (1901–1991), and they remained married until his death. The couple had at least three children: a son and two daughters.

Bernard died on October 7, 1979, in a Beaverton-area hospital.
