= Kinnamōns =

Bakery in the U.S. state of Oregon

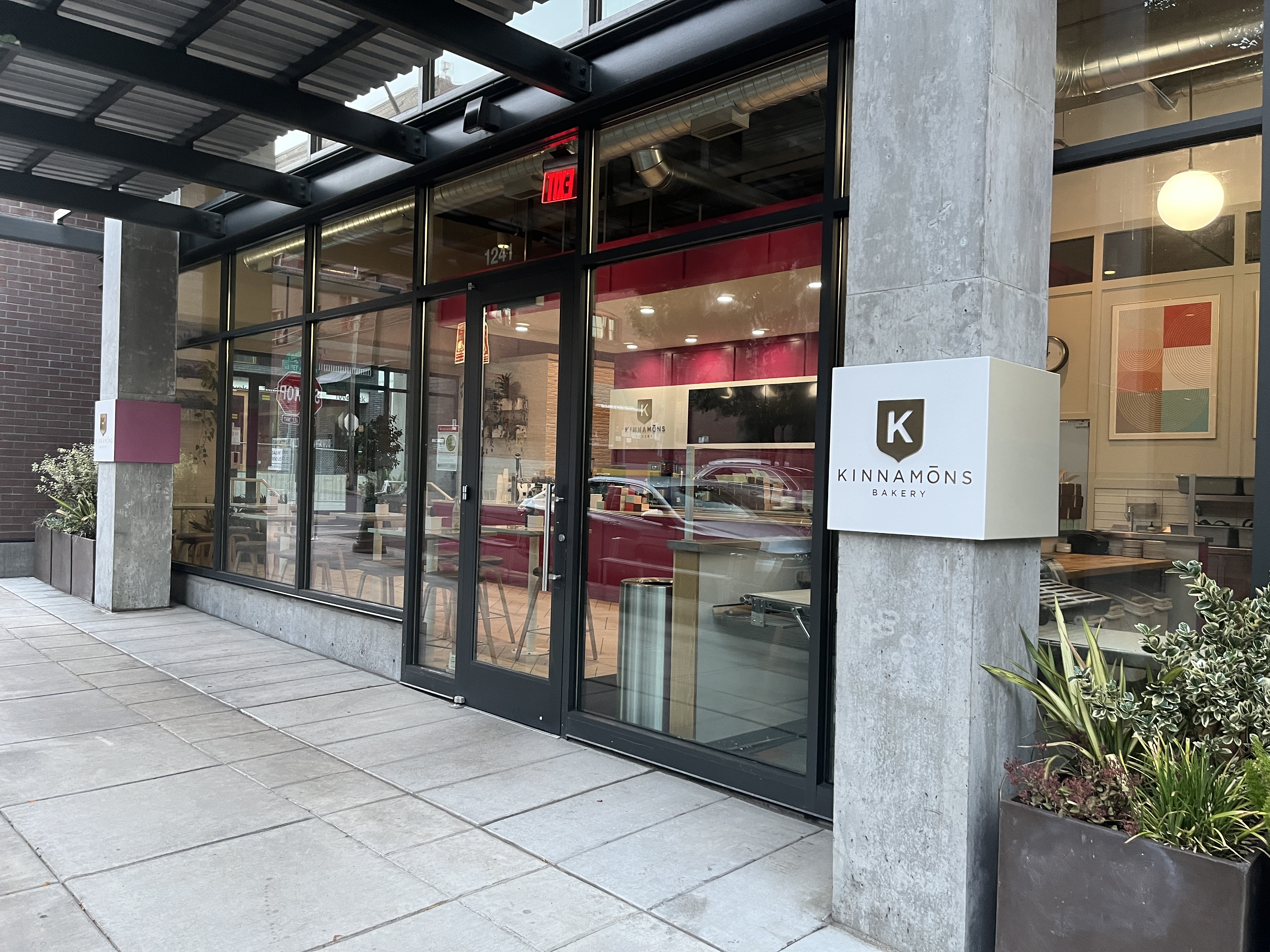
- The bakery in northwest Portland's Pearl District in 2022

Restaurant information
- Established: July 2022
- Owner: Craveworthy Brands (2025–present)
- Previous owner: Ndamukong Suh (2022–2025)
- Location: Cedar Hills; Portland, Oregon, United States
- Website: kinnamons.com

Kinnamōns is a cinnamon roll business based in the Portland metropolitan area, in the U.S. state of Oregon. The first bakery opened in northwest Portland's Pearl District in 2022. Another bakery opened in Beaverton's Cedar Hills Crossing in 2023. In 2024, the original bakery closed, operations moved to the location in northeast Portland's Concordia neighborhood, and the Beaverton bakery became the flagship location.

== Description ==
Kinnamōns operates two bakeries in the Portland metropolitan area; the flagship bakery is in Beaverton's Cedar Hills Crossing and another location is in northeast Portland. The name of the business is derived from the Greek word for cinnamon ("kinámōmon"). Kinnamōns serves cinnamon rolls with various glazes and icing flavors. Varieties include Banana Cream Pie, Blueberry Crumble, Caramel Apple Pie, Cookies and Cream, Key Lime Pie, Maple Bacon, Passionfruit Chocolate, Peanut Butter Chocolate Pretzel, Raspberry Pistachio, Tiramisu. Kinnamōns also offers coffee drinks.

== History ==
Kinnamōns was founded by restaurateur Micah Camden in 2022. Initially owned by former professional American football player Ndamukong Suh, the business was acquired by Craveworthy Brands in 2025. Suh will continue as an investor and will join Craveworthy's advisory board.

The first bakery opened on Thurman Street in northwest Portland's Pearl District in July 2022. A second bakery opened in Beaverton in December 2023. In 2024, the original bakery closed and the production facility moved to Alberta Street in northeast Portland's Concordia neighborhood. The Beaverton location became the flagship. Camden attributed the Pearl District bakery's end to a decrease in foot traffic and the closure of other businesses in the neighborhood.

In 2023, free cinnamon rolls were offered to commemorate the opening of the Baes Fried Chicken at Alberta Alley.

In March 2025, it was announced that Craveworthy Brands had acquired Kinnamōns.

== See also ==
- List of bakeries
