= Bernard's Airport =

Former airfield in Beaverton, Oregon

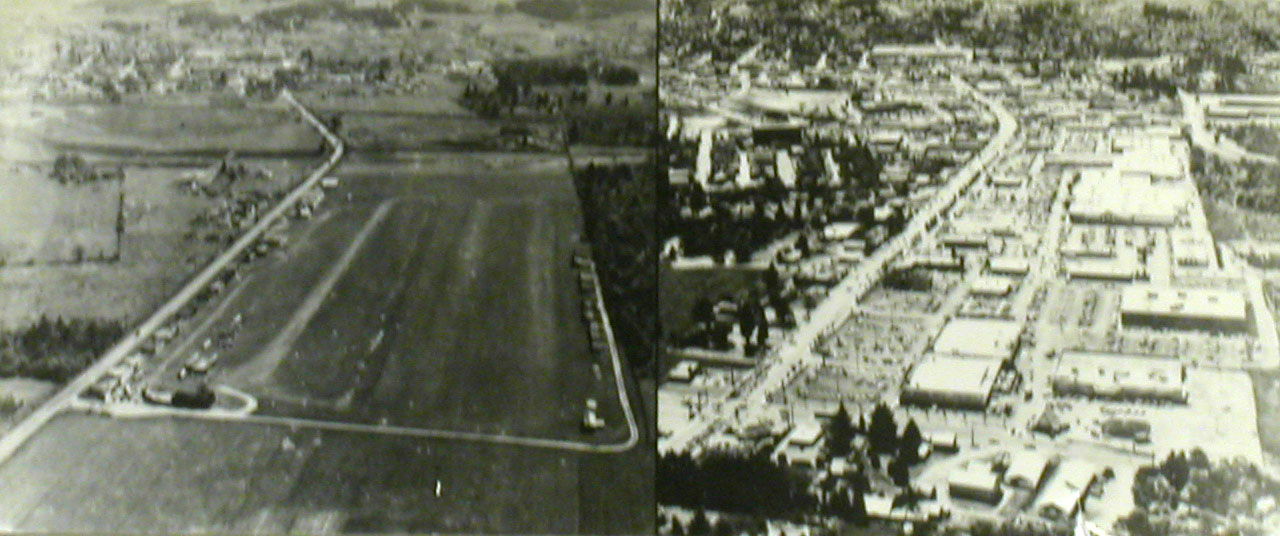
- Bernard's Airport in the 1930s (looking south) with a 1980s view of the replacement shopping mall
- IATA: none; ICAO: none

Summary
- Airport type: Private
- Location: Beaverton, Oregon
- Opened: 1928
- Closed: February 1969
- Coordinates: 45°29′48.93″N 122°48′37.63″W

Map
- Location within Oregon

Bernard's Airport, also known as Bernard Airport, was a non-commercial airfield in Beaverton, Oregon, United States, from 1928 to 1969. In its early years, it was one of two private airports located in Beaverton, the other being Watts Field, about one-half mile to the south of Bernard's Airport. The Bernard Airport site was redeveloped in 1969 as "Bernard's Beaverton Mall", now known as Cedar Hills Crossing.

== History ==
Both of Beaverton's airports were opened in the latter half of the 1920s. The first was Watts Field, or Watts Airport, located on the west side of Erickson Avenue, along what is now 6th Street, to the southwest of the center of town. Different sources give its opening year as either circa 1925–26 or 1928.

Its site was originally developed as a motion picture studio in 1922, Premium Picture Productions opening its Beaverton Studios on the site in that year. The airport was named for Dr. G.E. Watts, the financier behind the film venture in Beaverton, who was also an aviation enthusiast. Premium Pictures went out of business in late 1925, after filmmaking on the West Coast became concentrated in Hollywood, and in 1928 the buildings were sold to Davis-Langman Aircraft Corporation, but G.E. Watts remained an investor. The 33-acre (130,000 m^{2}) film studio site was converted into an airstrip. In 1929, the facilities were sold to the Breese Aircraft Corporation (of San Francisco), for use in aircraft manufacturing. The first airplane manufactured in Beaverton was launched in April 1930, and the Watts airstrip was used for many test flights.

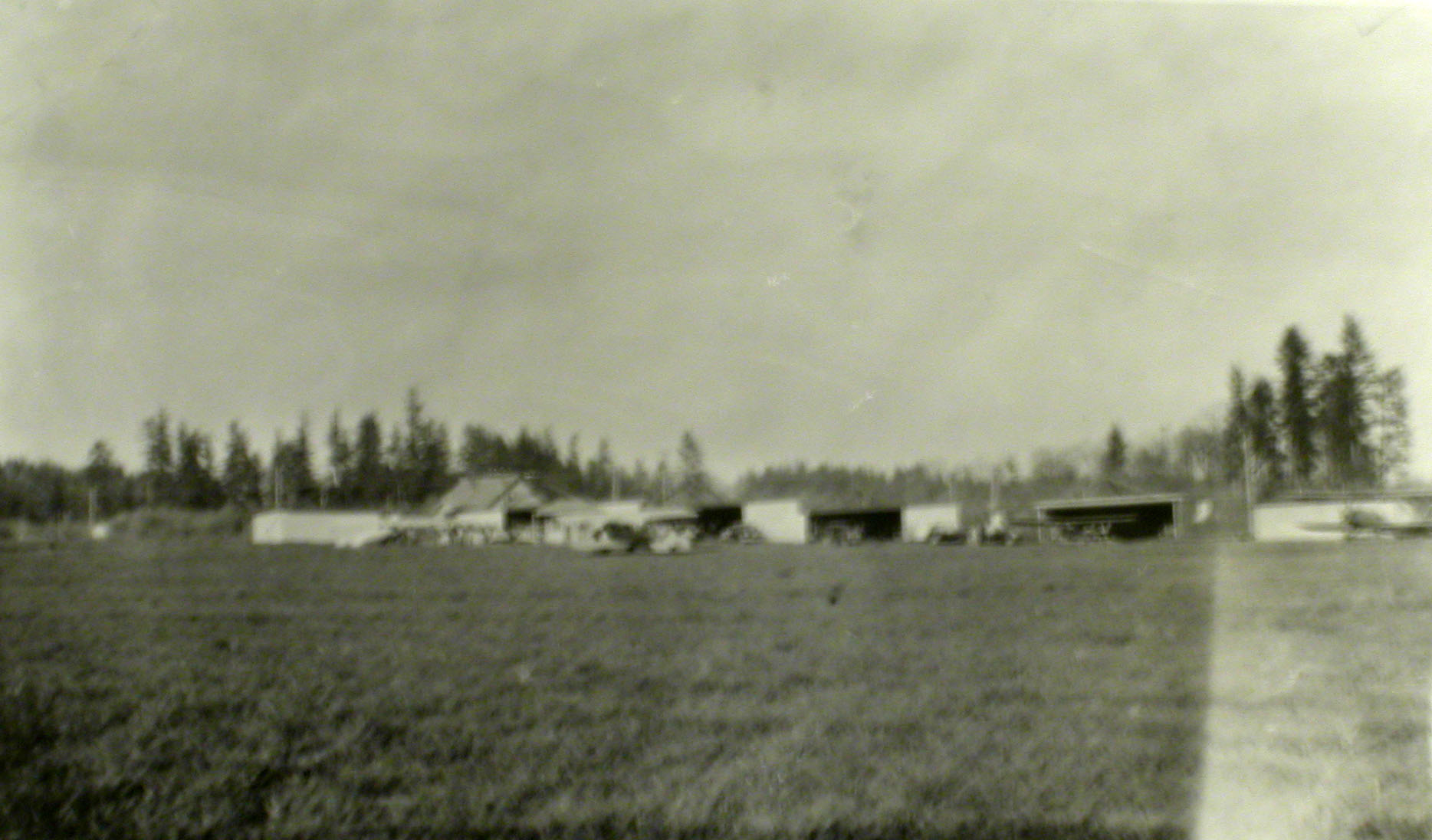
Bernard Airport in 1934

Later in 1928, Beaverton's second airport began to take shape, as Charles Bernard erected the first hangar along what is now Cedar Hills Blvd. (then Cedar Street), to the northwest of the center of Beaverton. Named Bernard's Airport, it was located about one-half mile north of Watts Airport, immediately north of Beaverton Creek (with its south end just south of present-day Hall Blvd.).

Air & Space/Smithsonian has stated that the real history of grassroots aviation in Oregon began in "the hayfields of Beaverton" (i.e. Watts Field and Bernard's Airport), where aircraft innovation design achieved a wide circle of inventors and pilots. As of 1932, Watts Airport had 60 acres (240,000 m^{2}) of land, with 10 airplanes based there (and room for 40 planes), and was the third-busiest of nine airports then operating in the Portland metropolitan area, while Bernard's Airport occupied 30 acres (120,000 m^{2}) and had only three planes based there at that time.

== Expansion ==
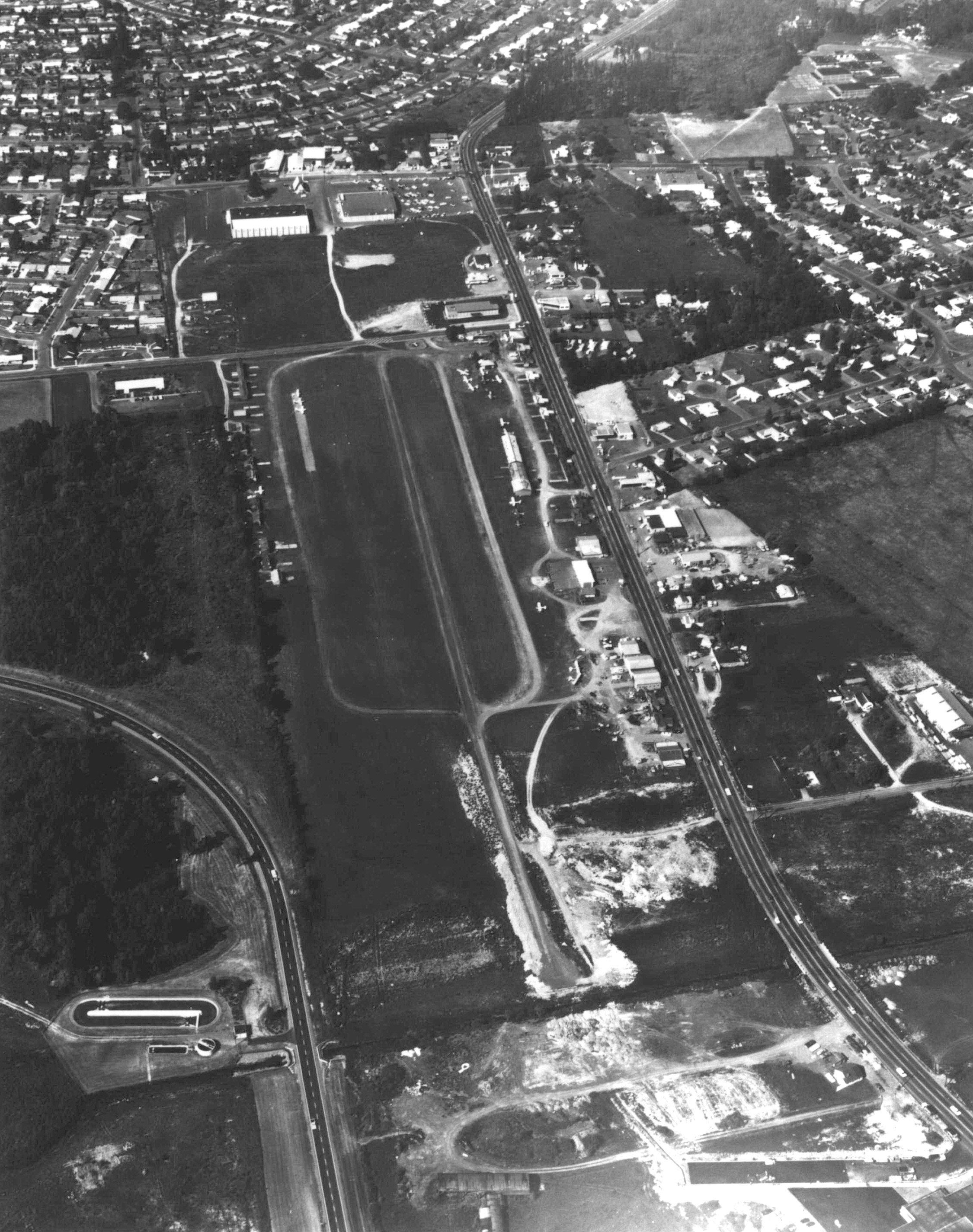
Aerial view of Bernard's Airport in 1966, looking north

Activity at Watts Airport began to outgrow the site, so some of its users convinced 'Charlie' Bernard (as he was commonly known) to expand his nearby airport. Several additional wood frame hangars were constructed, designed by George Edward Moshofsky, a Beaverton builder whose home was across the street from the airstrip. The unusual design, which accommodated the aircraft wings, was later depicted in a mural at the Salem Airport. The home-built airplane industry in Beaverton thrived.

Bernard's Airport and Watts Airport were still in operation concurrently in 1935, but Watts Airport closed not long afterwards, leading to still more expansion at the Bernard airfield.

The Oregonian of September 11, 1938, stated that Bernard Airport was "perhaps the busiest non-commercial airport in the United States". By 1955, Bernard's Airport had 44 wooden hangars, along with numerous open sheds (or "plane-ports") capable of housing more than 100 additional light aircraft. By that time, it was "Oregon's oldest – and one of its busiest – private airports". It was also once known as the "oldest continuously-operated airport in Oregon".

== Problems ==
The Cedar Hills residential area was built between 1946 and 1955, 1,500 ft (460 m) to the north of the airport. Some residents disliked having airplanes flying so near their homes and in 1955 a group of 34 property owners filed a lawsuit claiming that the planes were trespassing in the airspace above their properties, in an attempt to force the airport to close. A circuit court judge ruled against them. However, soon afterward, Jenkins Road was built, cutting across the north end of the runway, despite objections by Charlie Bernard and others to the county commission.

In 1963, Bernard considered selling his then-60-acre (0.24 km^{2}) property for redevelopment as housing, after his airport began to lose money, a change he attributed to a big increase in his property taxes. Bernard was still living nearby at the time, in his family's old farmhouse on Walker Road. He decided against selling at that time.

== Closure ==
In January 1969, Bernard announced that he had leased his 60 acres (0.24 km^{2}), including the 40 acres of airport property, to a group of developers and that the airport would close in February. The airport was to be replaced by a shopping mall. Closure of the runways was set for February 1. At this time, the airport had 40 hangars remaining, and around 100 planes were residing there. Demolition of the hangars began in late February and was nearing completion in mid-March, although the last few planes had not yet been removed at that time.

The shopping mall, known since 2002 as Cedar Hills Crossing, was originally named "Bernard's Beaverton Mall" (and referred to as "Bernard Mall", for short), after the local aviation pioneer who still owned the property.
