= Joyce Hotel =

Historic building in Portland, Oregon, U.S.

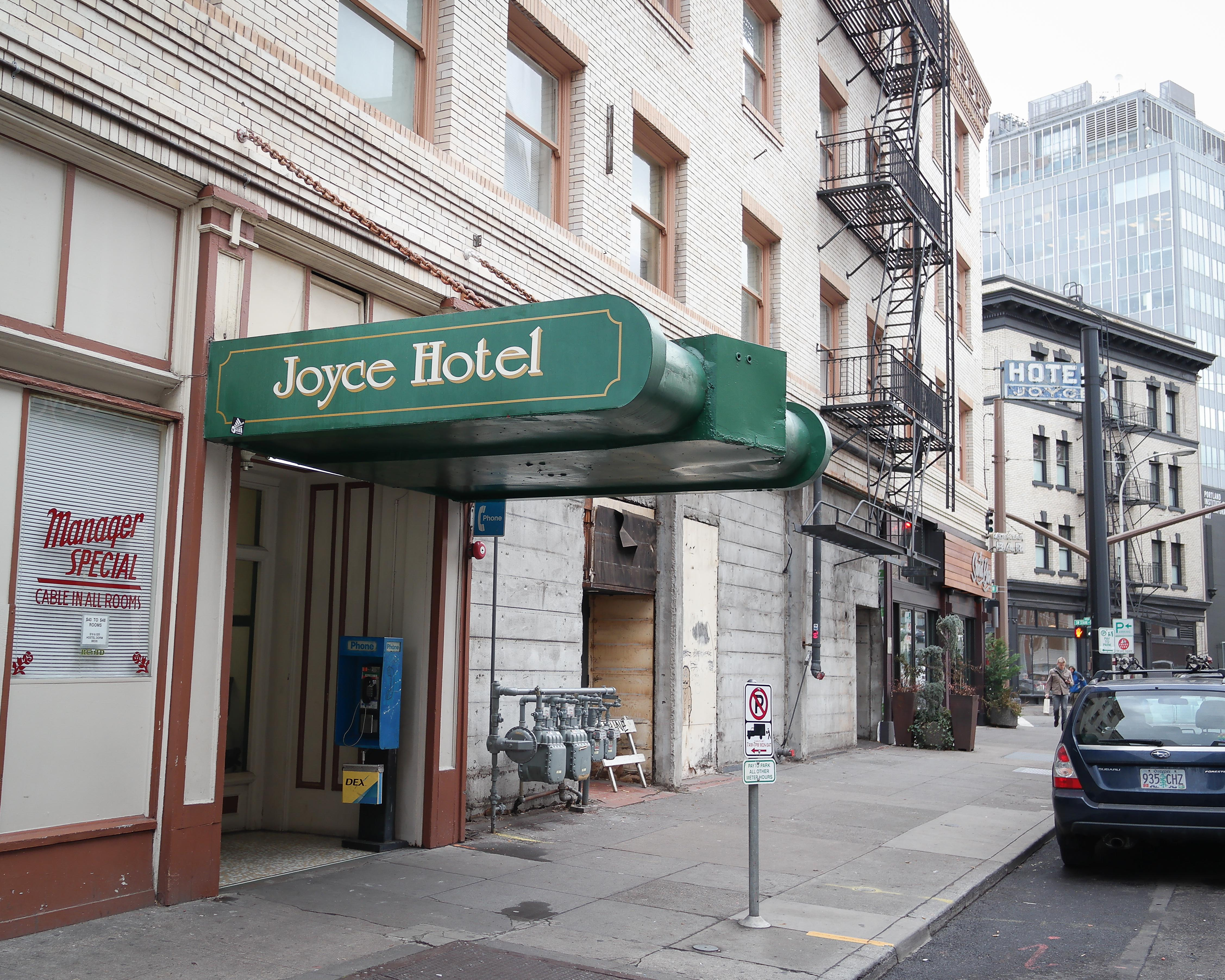
- The building's exterior in 2014
- Interactive map of the Joyce Hotel area

General information
- Location: Portland, Oregon, United States
- Coordinates: 45°31′21″N 122°40′55″W

The Joyce Hotel, formerly Hotel Treves, is an historic building and former hotel in downtown Portland, Oregon. The building has housed Fish Grotto.

== History ==
The Portland Housing Bureau purchased the building in 2016. In February 2022, work began on an estimated $21 million project to renovate the currently vacant building to provide 66 units of permanent affordable housing, mental health services, and ground-floor retail space.
