= Union Way =

Building in Portland, Oregon, U.S.

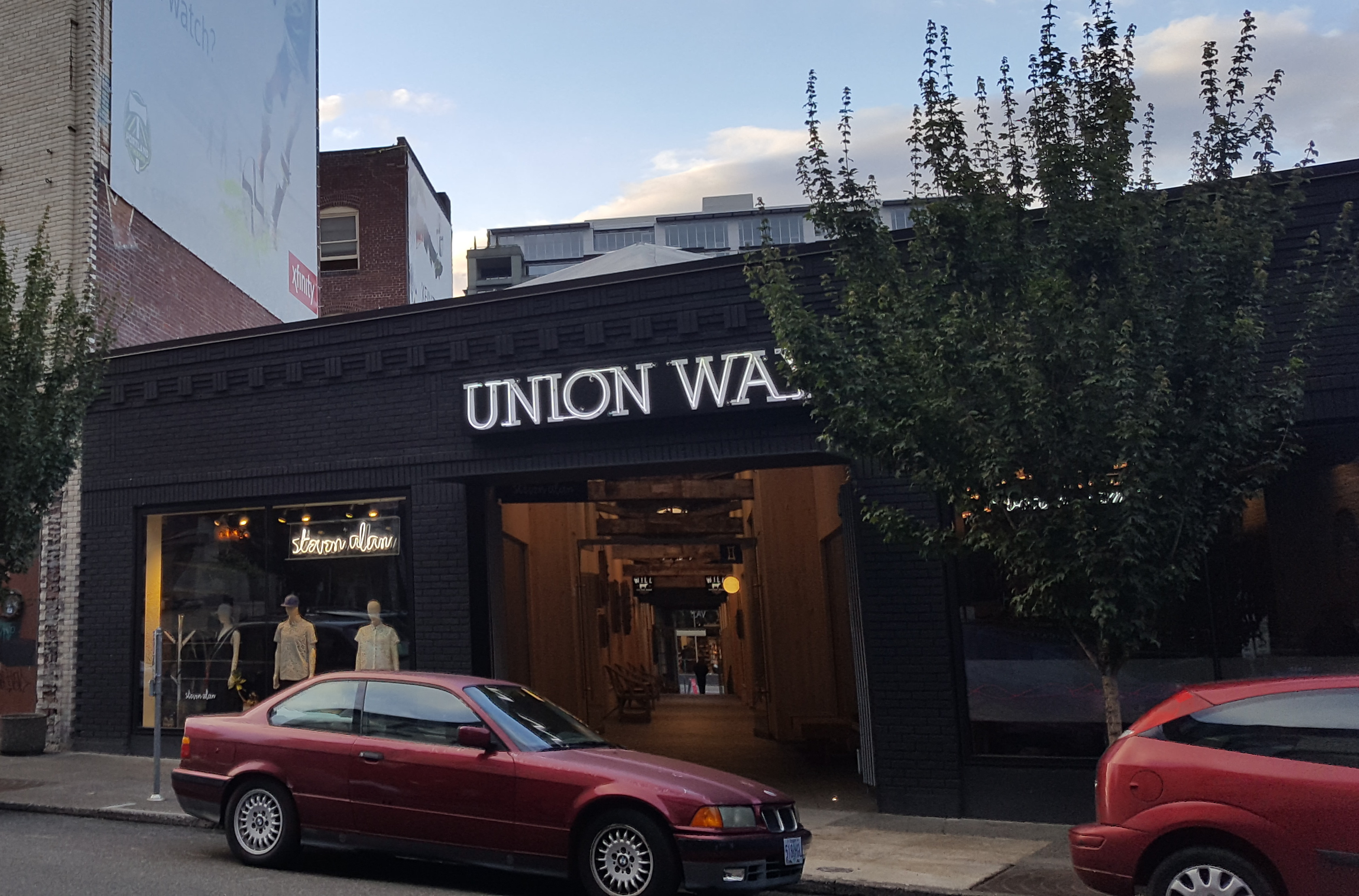
- Union Way in 2016
- Interactive map of the Union Way area

General information
- Location: Portland, Oregon, United States
- Coordinates: 45.5226°N 122.6817°W

Union Way is a corridor and retail gallery in Portland, Oregon, United States. Located along West Burnside Street in the West End district of downtown Portland, it is inspired by Paris's glass-roofed retail arcades, according to Condé Nast Traveler.

== Description and history ==
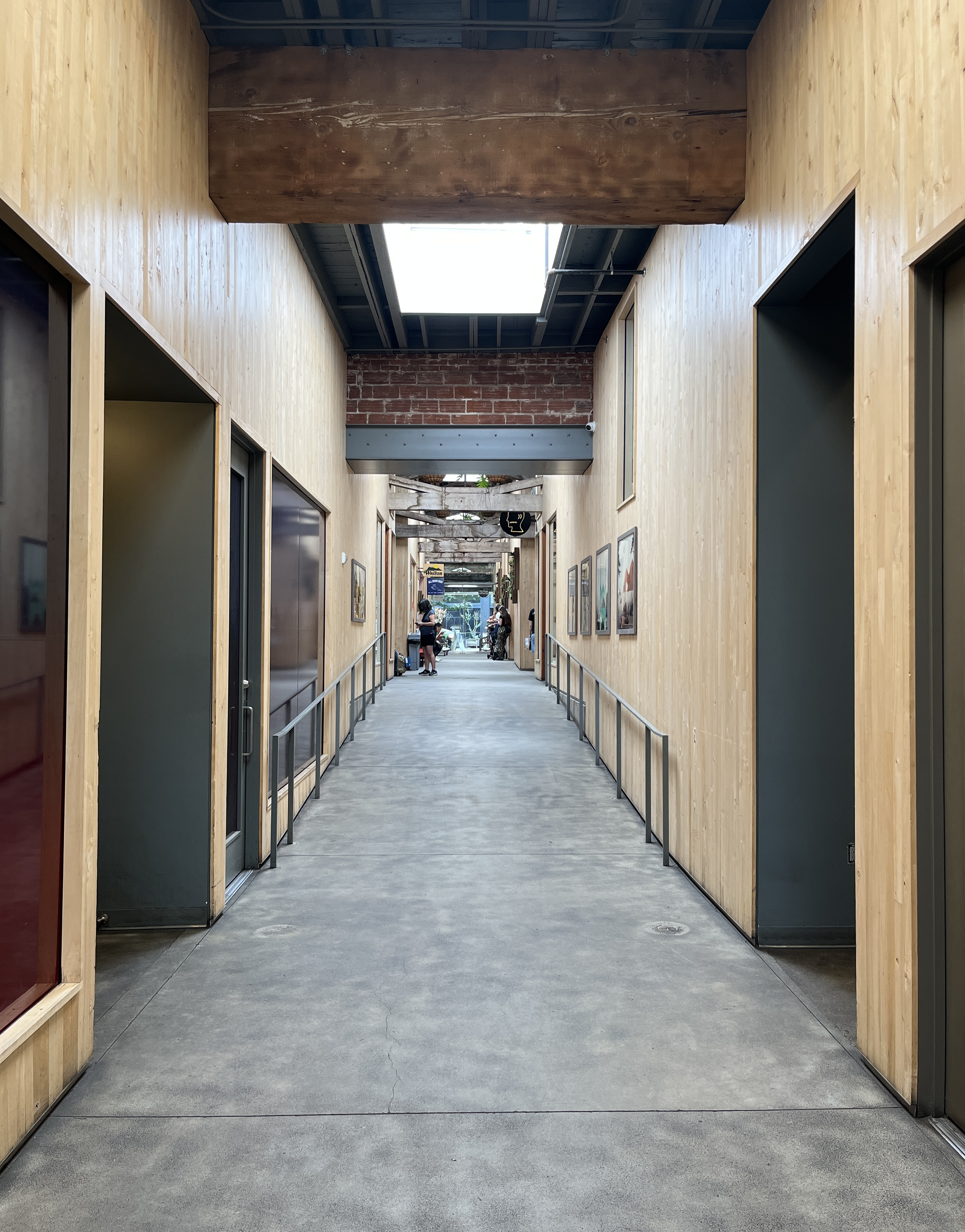
Interior, 2025

Union Way has concrete floors, wood walls, and windows in the ceiling. The corridor connects the Ace Hotel to Powell's Books. It was designed by Lever Architecture, which is based in Portland. Union was converted from an early 20th-century brick garage and replaced two nightclubs: Aura and Red Cap Garage. Union opened in 2013.

=== Vendors ===
Vendors have included All Good, Danner, Spruce Apothecary, Steven Alan, and Unless Collective, Self Edge, and Will Leather Goods. Shops have sold products ranging from candy to Japanese denim. Previously, the restaurant Boxer Ramen operated at Union Way's southern end. The ramen restaurant Ikimono later operated in the same space. Swee2o Drinks and Desserts has no seating and operates via take-out only. Wailua Shave Ice operates in Union Way.

== Reception ==
Chris Onstad of the Portland Mercury called Union Way "precious" in 2014. In 2016, Ben Barna of Nylon wrote, "This very impressive feat of urban development takes the traditional, turn-of-the-century European concept of a shopping arcade, and updates it with some very chic, very minimalist Scandinavian design." Carrie Brownstein has said, "It's almost meta, but Union Way both comments on and embodies all of Portland's lifestyle and aesthetic aspirations." Jen Stevenson of Condé Nast Traveler described Union Way as a "beautiful skylight-illuminated, succulent-lined, blonde wood breezeway" and "Portland's answer to Diagon Alley".
