= Red Cap Garage =

Defunct gay bar and nightclub in Portland, Oregon, U.S.

- Logo

- The bar's exterior, 2010
- Interactive map of Red Cap Garage
- Address: 1035 Southwest Stark Street
- Location: Portland, Oregon, United States
- Coordinates: 45.52233°N 122.68172°W
- Type: Gay bar; nightclub

Construction
- Opened: 1987
- Closed: August 18, 2012

Red Cap Garage, sometimes abridged as Red Cap, was a gay bar and nightclub that operated in Portland, Oregon, from 1987 to 2012. The bar was connected to two others called Boxxes and the Brig. It hosted drag queen shows, live music, special events, and viewing parties. In 2012, the bar was sold and closed after operating for 25 years. The building which housed Red Cap was gutted to make way for the retail alley known as Union Way.

== Description and history ==
Red Cap Garage, established in 1987, occupied a building which once housed a taxicab company. The bar faced Stark Street and was connected to two others called Boxxes and the Brig, and the restaurant Fish Grotto. In 2008, Out Traveler's Jason Rowan described the three establishments as: "interconnected bars offer[ing] one-stop shopping: twink go-go boys in Boxxes, dirty smokers in Red Cap, and late-night clubbing at the Brig. Good-natured, sauced-up fun reigns in this trampy labyrinth, especially during Tuesday night drink specials."

Red Cap held events like "Bearracuda", "Peep Show", "Portland Drag Race", "Portland Idol", and "Queerlandia", and hosted disc jockeys as well as the drag queens Joey Arias, Lady Bunny, and Sherry Vine. It also hosted RuPaul's Drag Race participants and viewing parties of the reality competition television series.

In June 2010, the bar's events manager started a project allowing bias crime victims to report incidents to a trained "ally" at Red Cap, following an attack on six gay men who were assaulted after leaving the establishment.

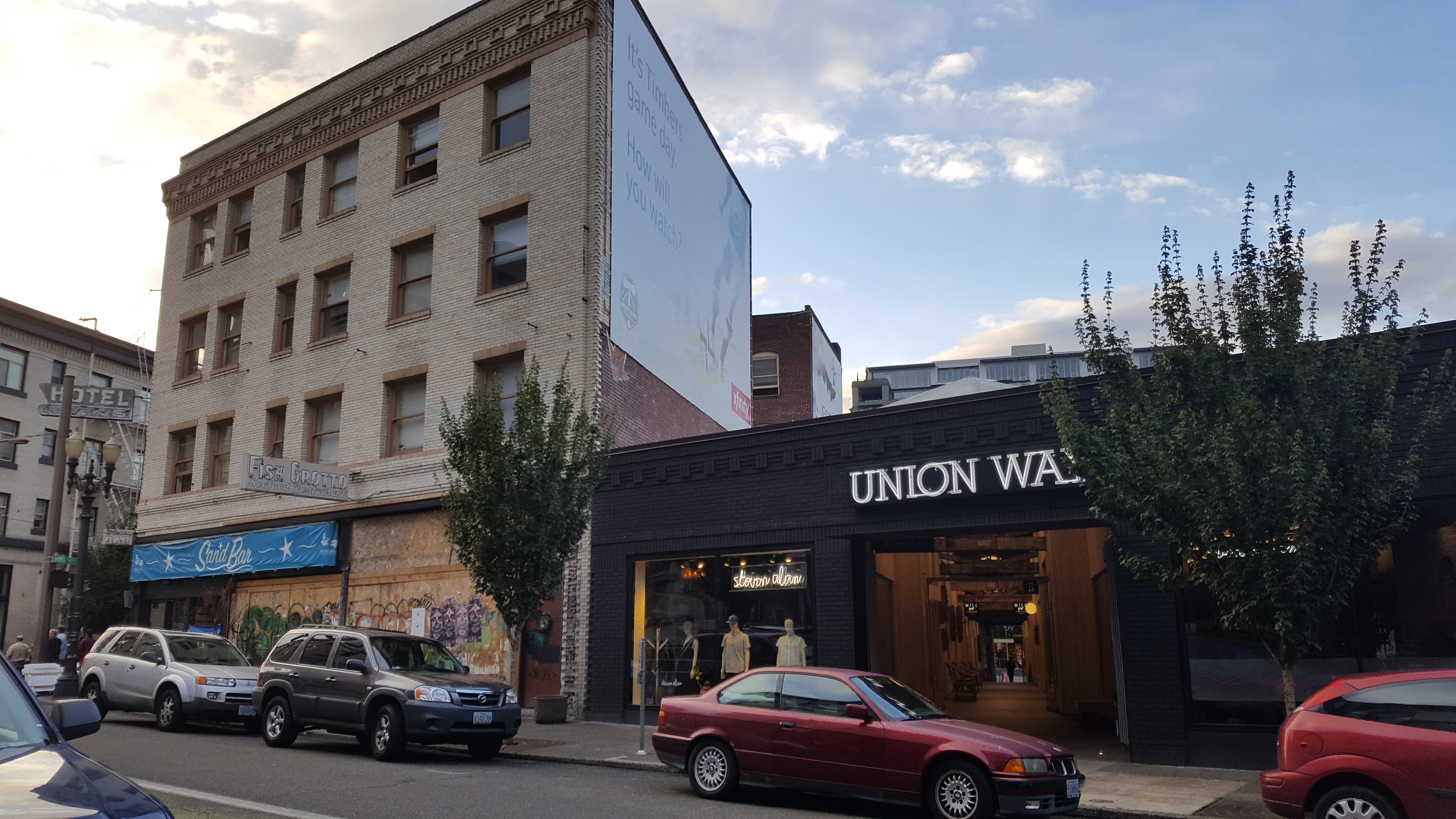
Stark Street in 2016; the building that housed Red Cap Garage was gutted to create Union Way

In 2012, rumors began circulating about Red Cap's possible sale and closure. The bar's plans were confirmed on Facebook in a statement which read, in part:

Well, the rumors are true. After 25 fantastic years with the best customers and staff Red Cap Garage will be closing on August 18th. So, get ready – there will be a massive blow-out party on the 18th! We are working on the details right now and will be posting the event shortly. We hope that all our friends will be able to make it down in the next few weeks to say goodbye to us!

The nightclub closed on August 18, 2012, after operating for 25 years. The buildings that housed Red Cap and Aura, a nightclub facing Burnside Street, were gutted to create the retail alley Union Way.

== Reception ==
In 2011, Willamette Week's Ruth Brown said, "Red Cap Garage still parties like it's 1987. The crowd is generally younger and less hairy than at nearby Scandals, but the huge, heaving sunken dance floor welcomes all comers—from queens to hags—while the entertainment ranges from bingo nights to all-male revues to simply sitting on the heated front patio watching unsuspecting tourists and yuppies wander in off the street—then quickly run out again." In 2012, Red Cap and Aura were co-nominated for the Q Means Business Award at the Q Center's Winter Gala Awards.

In an article confirming the bar's closure, Marjorie Skinner of The Portland Mercury wrote: "While Red Cap was mainly a queer bar, I know I'm not the only ally who will miss it—the people there were always welcoming, the food was totally decent, and the drinks were (sometimes dangerously) cheap (where oh where will I escape to now when Clyde Common is too packed/expensive/stop 'n' chatty??)." PQ Monthly's Daniel Borgen called Red Cap a "Stark Street staple for much of our modern gay history". Furthermore, he said of the bar and its closure:

In its heyday, it–in its many incarnations–was the place to be any given night, and plenty of people have made valiant attempts at creating a new round of glory days ... Whatever one might think about the venue or Stark Street in general, Red Cap has hosted many a memorable event and evening, and count this writer among those who'll always remember it quite fondly. I'm more than a little sad to see it go.

== See also ==
- Culture of Portland, Oregon
- List of LGBTQ bars
