= Baes Fried Chicken =

Restaurant in Portland, Oregon, U.S.

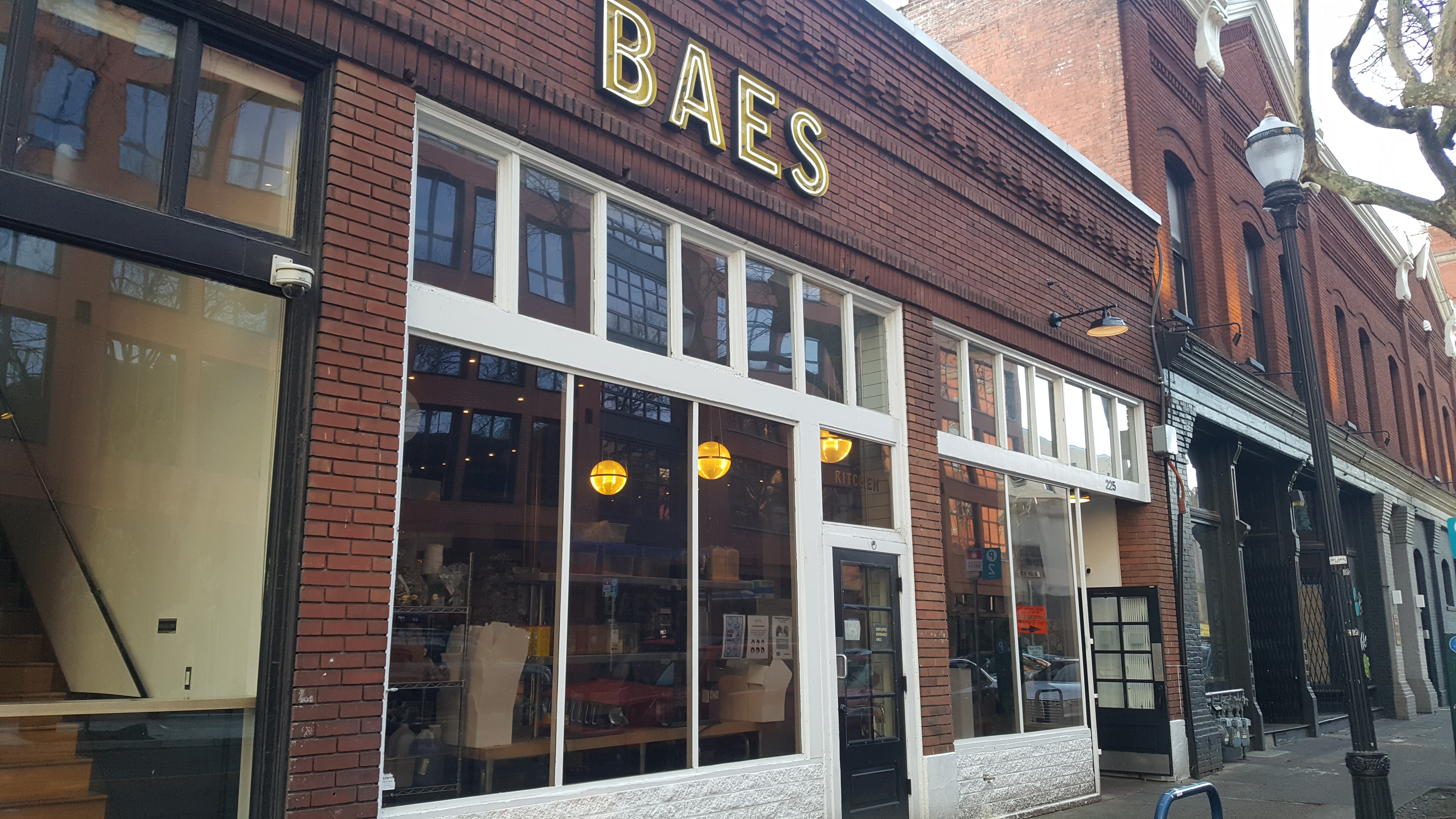
- Exterior of the original restaurant in Southwest Portland, Oregon, in 2022
- Interactive map of Baes Fried Chicken

Restaurant information
- Owners: Micah Camden; Ndamukong Suh
- Food type: Southern
- Location: 225 Southwest Ash Street; 1613 Southeast Bybee Boulevard; 3003 Northeast Alberta Street, Portland, Oregon, United States
- Coordinates: 45.5222°N 122.6729°W
- Website: baeschicken.com

Baes Fried Chicken, or Baes Chicken, is a fried chicken restaurant with three locations in Portland, Oregon, United States. The original restaurant opened in Old Town Chinatown in November 2019. Outposts opened in southeast Portland's Sellwood-Moreland neighborhood in July 2020, and on Alberta Street in northeast Portland's Concordia neighborhood in January 2023. Baes has also been a vendor at the Moda Center.

== Description ==
Baes Fried Chicken is a fried chicken restaurant with three locations in Portland; the business operates in Old Town Chinatown, in southeast Portland's Sellwood-Moreland neighborhood, and on Alberta Street in northeast Portland's Concordia neighborhood. Baes is also a vendor at the Moda Center, an arena in the Lloyd District.

=== Menu ===
The menu includes fried and grilled chicken as tenders, bone-in, or in sandwiches, as well as Southern-inspired sides such as coleslaw, kale, macaroni and cheese, mashed potatoes, and waffle fries. According to Brooke Jackson-Glidden of Eater Portland, "The restaurant was designed to be very friendly to takeout and delivery, focusing on speed and its ability to hold up when it travels." Willamette Week has said the chicken is made "with ruthless efficiency and alarming consistency".

The Alberta Street location serves "brunch dishes like chicken fried steak waffles, maple-bacon biscuits, and deviled eggs with smoked trout caviar".

== History ==
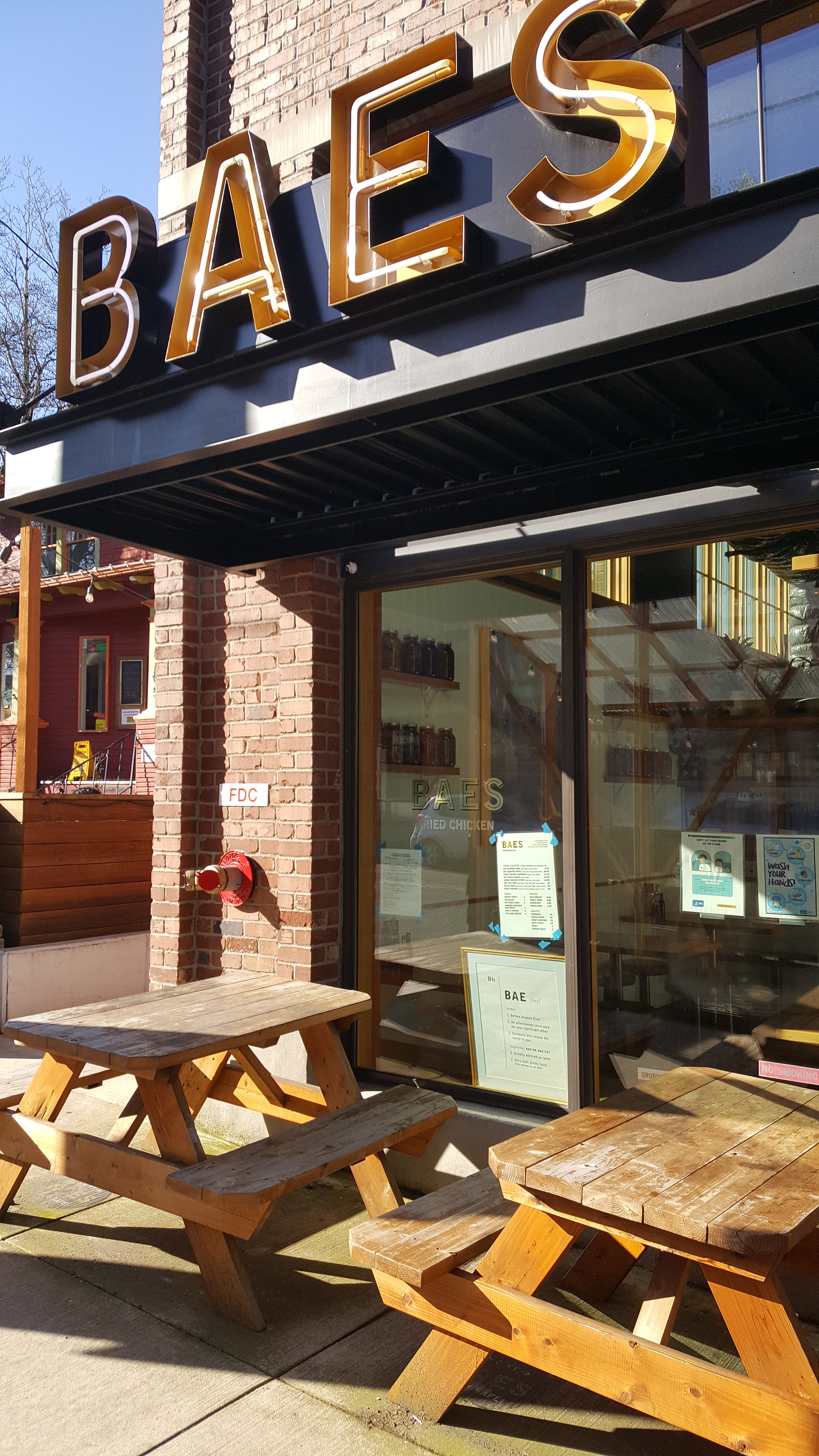
Exterior of the Sellwood-Moreland restaurant, 2022

Restaurateur Micah Camden (Blue Star Donuts, Boxer Ramen, SuperDeluxe) and National Football League player Ndamukong Suh opened the original restaurant in Old Town Chinatown in November 2019, in the space that previously housed Ash Street Saloon. A thousand free chicken sandwiches were distributed on opening day.

In mid 2020, the co-owners confirmed plans to open a second location on Bybee Boulevard in the Westmoreland district of Sellwood-Moreland, replacing a Boxer Ramen restaurant. The restaurant opened in July and has since closed.

For the Super Bowl in 2021, Baes donated all proceeds from both locations to the Suh Family Foundation. The restaurant was a vendor at the Moda Center, as of 2021.

A third brick and mortar location opened on Alberta Street on January 14, 2023. It had closed by February 2025.

== Reception ==
The Oregonian's Michael Russell included Baes in a 2020 list of the city's 40 best inexpensive restaurants. He has described the restaurant as "surprisingly tasty". Nick Woo included Baes in Eater Portland's 2021 list of fourteen "outstanding" fried chicken sandwiches in the city and said the restaurant "does not disappoint". Katherine Chew Hamilton included Baes in Portland Monthly's 2021 overview of the city's best fried chicken.

== See also ==
- List of chicken restaurants
- List of Southern restaurants
- List of restaurant chains in the United States
