= Rodgers Stores =

Variety store chain

Rodgers was a chain of five-and-dime stores based in Portland, Oregon, which was in business for 60 years, from 1938 to 1998. The chain's largest store was believed to be the largest independent variety store on the U.S. West Coast at the time of its opening in 1955. It occupied a newly constructed three-story, 100-by-100-foot (30 m × 30 m) building in Portland's Hollywood District and replaced two successive previous stores in that area.

The company was founded by Kenneth E. Rodgers and his brother, Frederick A. Rodgers, who were its co-owners and presidents until Fred died in 1960 and Kenneth retired in 1972. Regina Rodgers, wife of Frederick Rodgers, continued to operate several stores after his death. Kenneth opened the first store in 1938, added a second store in 1944 (in the Hollywood District), and by 1953 he and Frederick had expanded to six locations, all in Portland at that time. Until the late 1950s, the chain was known as Rodgers' 5, 10, and 25 cent stores, or alternatively as Rodgers Five and Ten, before becoming simply Rodgers. The new building that opened in 1955 in the Hollywood District also housed the company's headquarters until the 1980s. A Rodgers store opened in the Cedar Hills Shopping Center, just west of Portland, in 1955, and the chain had eight stores in mid-1961. Over the years, some locations closed while others opened. By 1964, the eight stores in the Portland metropolitan area included ones in Lake Oswego, Oregon, and in central Beaverton. The Beaverton store, which had opened in 1958, closed in 1983. Meanwhile, the Cedar Hills store moved to Cedar Mill, another unincorporated area west of Portland.

By the late 1980s, Rodgers was finding it increasingly difficult to remain profitable in the face of competition from larger, national chains, and even variety store chains with nationwide coverage, such as Woolworth's and Newberry's, were succumbing to competition from chains featuring larger stores, such as Wal-Mart and Target. The company closed its Hollywood store and sold the building in 1984. Rodgers' Cedar Mill store closed in 1988, the space being taken over by an expanded Cedar Mill Library. The last three stores in the chain, in Portland's Menlo Park Shopping Center (at NE 122nd & Glisan), in the Westmoreland neighborhood, and in Lake Oswego, closed in early 1998.
