= Fish Grotto =

Defunct seafood restaurant in Portland, Oregon, U.S.

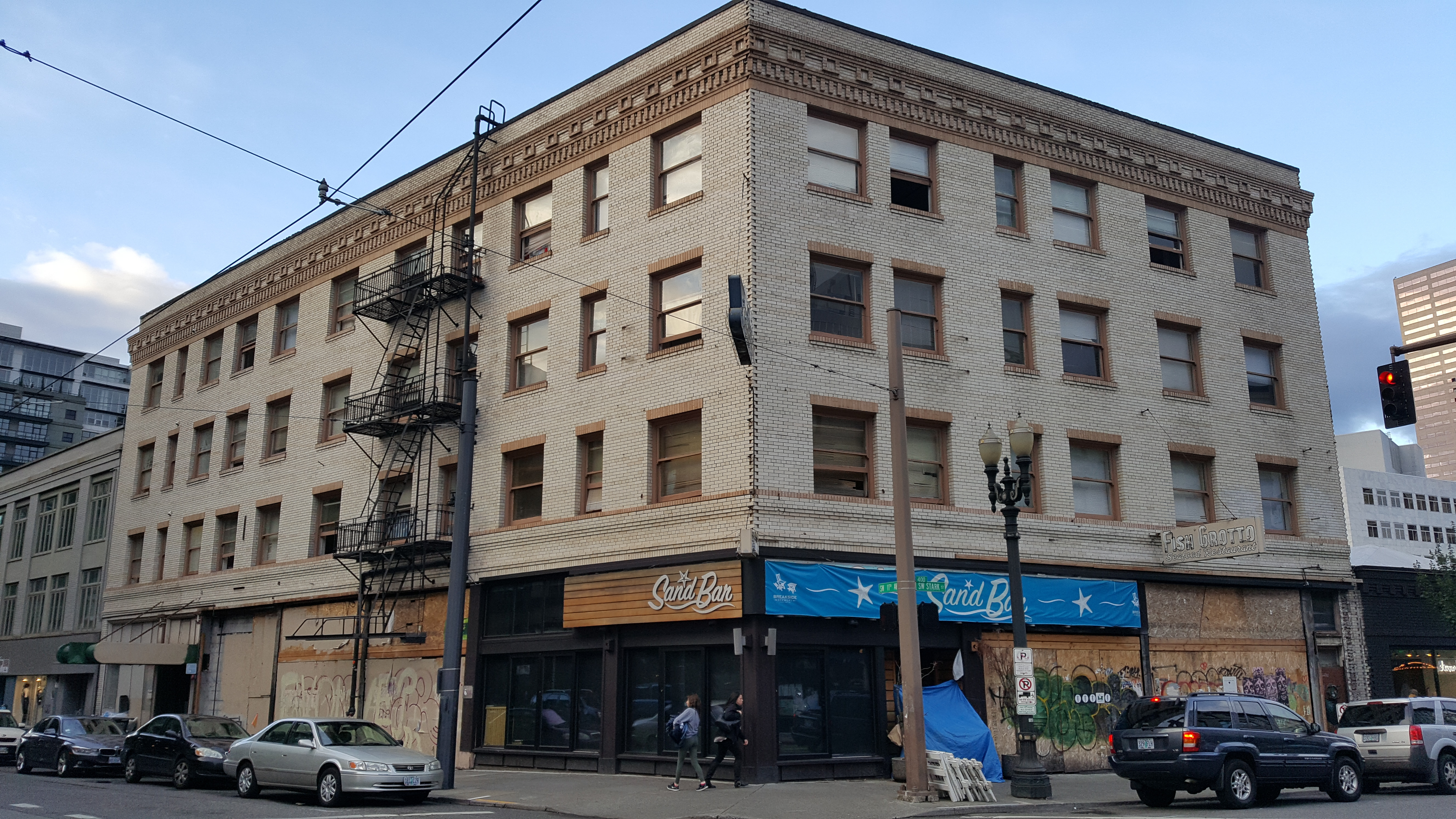
- Exterior of the Joyce Hotel, 2016
- Interactive map of Fish Grotto

Restaurant information
- Location: Portland, Multnomah, Oregon, United States
- Coordinates: 45°31′20.5″N 122°40′55″W

The Fish Grotto Seafood Restaurant, or simply Fish Grotto, was a seafood restaurant in Portland, Oregon. Established in 1891 as Zack's Oyster House, the business also operated a neighboring bar called Sand Bar at Fish Grotto, or simply Sand Bar. The restaurant stopped operating in January 2014.

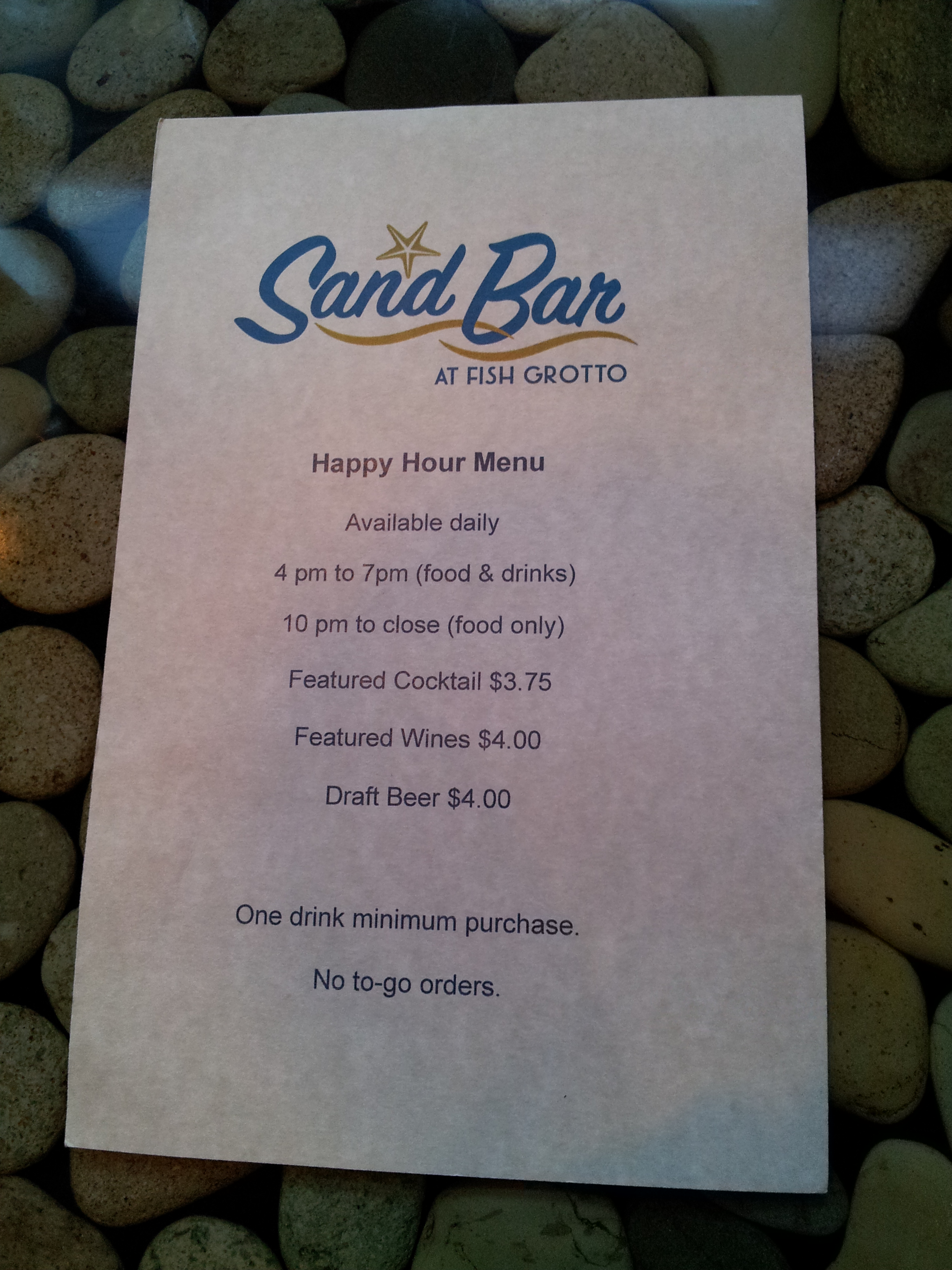
Sand Bar menu, 2014

== See also ==
- List of seafood restaurants
