= Cedar Hills, Oregon =

Unincorporated community in the state of Oregon, United States

- Census-designated place (CDP)
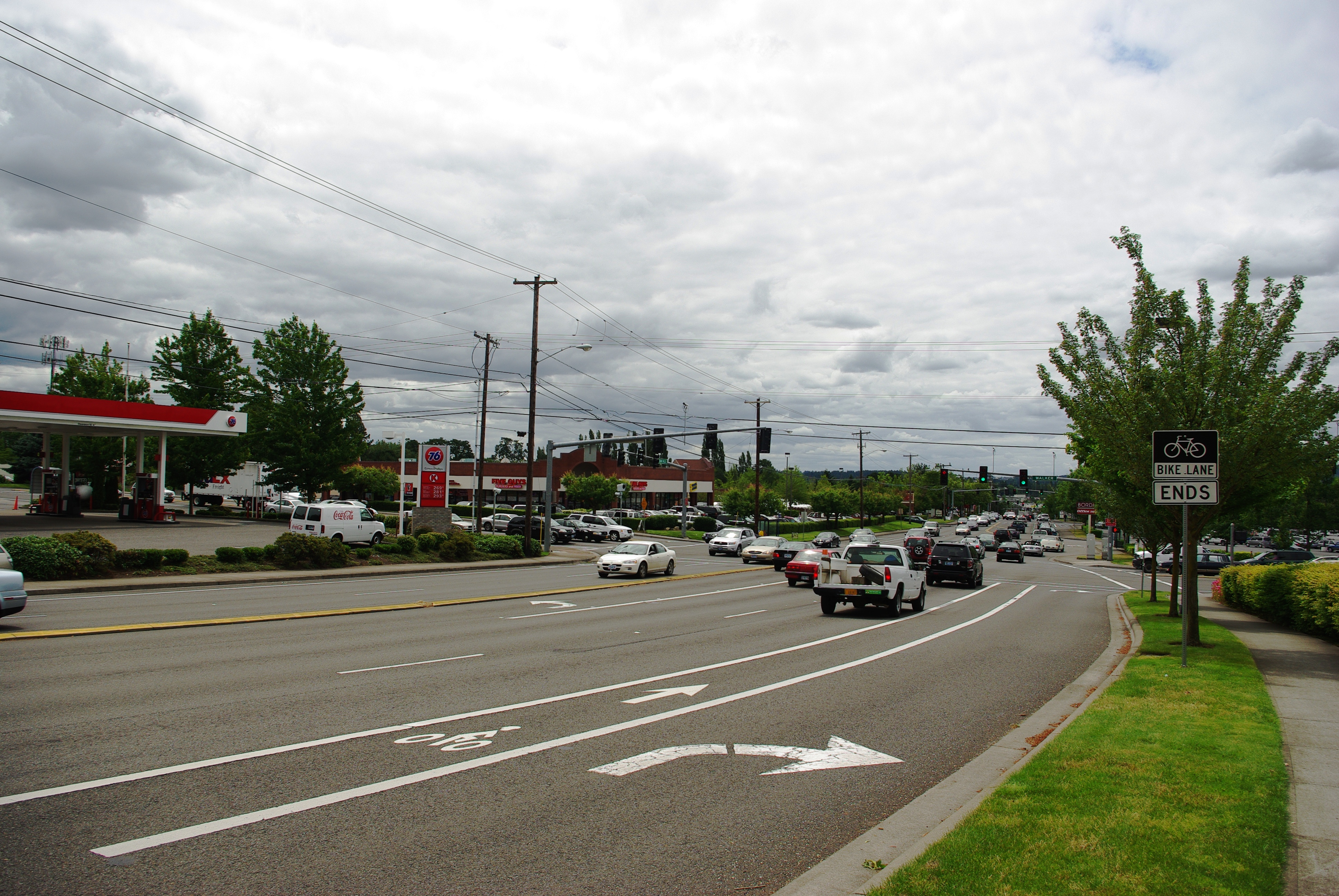
- Cedar Hills Boulevard and Walker Road, looking south, away from the Cedar Hills CDP area

- Location of Cedar Hills, Oregon
- Coordinates: 45°30′16″N 122°48′24″W
- Country: United States
- State: Oregon
- County: Washington
- Established: 1946

Area
  - Total: 1.90 sq mi (4.91 km^{2})
  - Land: 1.89 sq mi (4.89 km^{2})
  - Water: 0.0077 sq mi (0.02 km^{2})
- Elevation: 243 ft (74 m)

Population (2020)
  - Total: 8,379
  - Density: 4,442/sq mi (1,715.2/km^{2})
- Time zone: UTC-8 (Pacific (PST))
  - Summer (DST): UTC-7 (PDT)
- ZIP codes: 97005, 97225
- Area codes: 503 and 971
- FIPS code: 41-12050
- GNIS feature ID: 2408000

Cedar Hills is a census-designated place and neighborhood in Washington County, Oregon, United States south of U.S. Route 26 and west of Oregon Route 217 and within the Portland metropolitan area. Construction began in 1946. As of the 2020 census, Cedar Hills had a population of 8,379.

The formal Cedar Hills neighborhood currently includes 2,114 homes, whose owners are subject to the rules and covenants enforced by the area's homeowners' association, the Homes Association of Cedar Hills.

== History ==
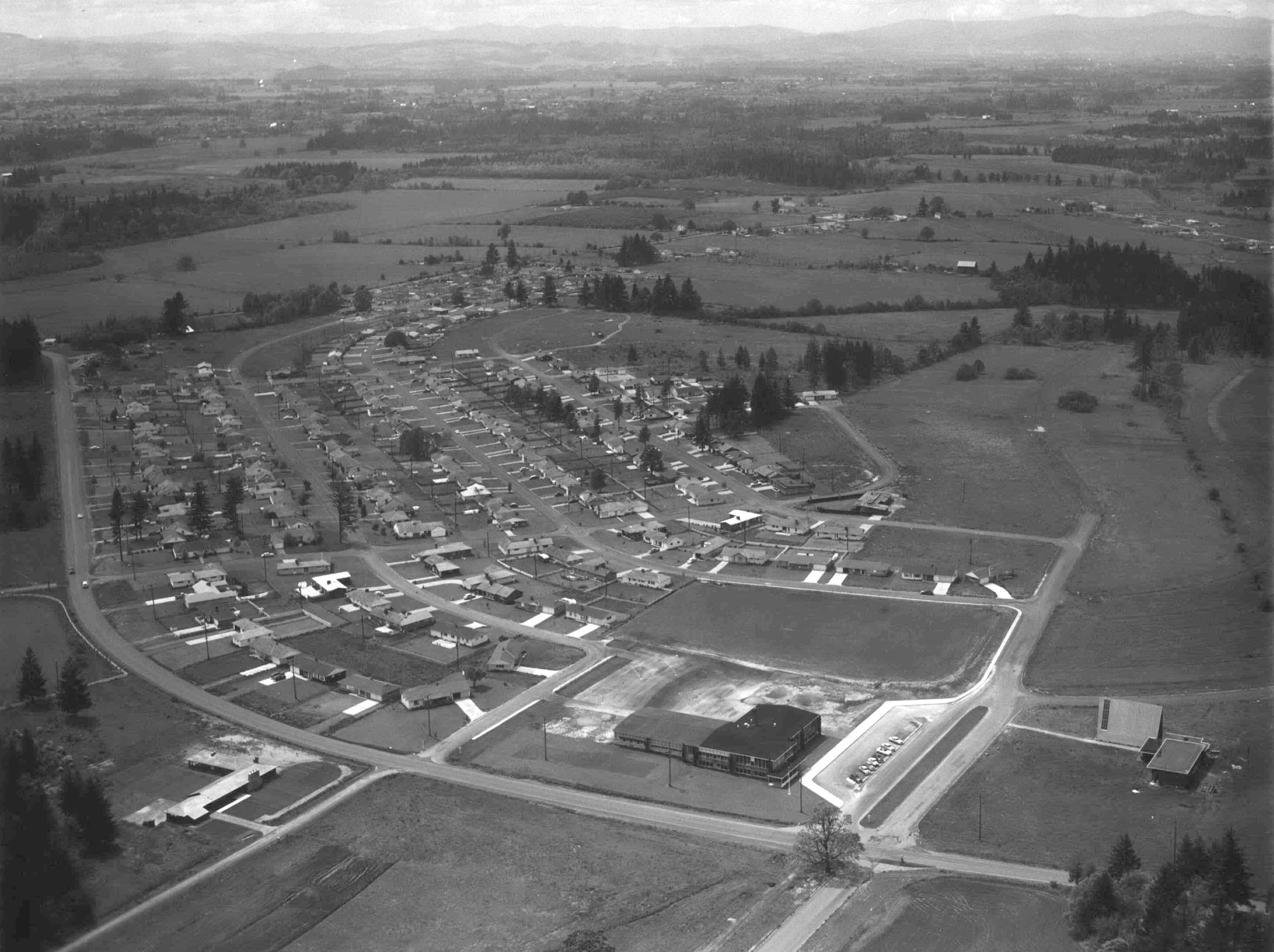
Cedar Hills in its early years. The prominent curving road is now Cedar Hills Blvd.

Plans to build the large new neighborhood were announced by the project's developers in April 1946, and construction of the first 50 homes had begun by then. Along with roads and utilities, the plans included a shopping center, schools, parks and churches, in a neighborhood of around 2,000 homes on about 800 acres (320 ha). A writer for The Oregonian newspaper at the time called it "the most ambitious suburban housing development ever attempted in the Northwest". The planned neighborhood was consistent with the racism in Oregon at the time, as the 1946 restrictions stated that "only Caucasians shall use or occupy the properties, except in the capacity of domestic servants, chauffeurs or employees."

Cedar Hills Shopping Center

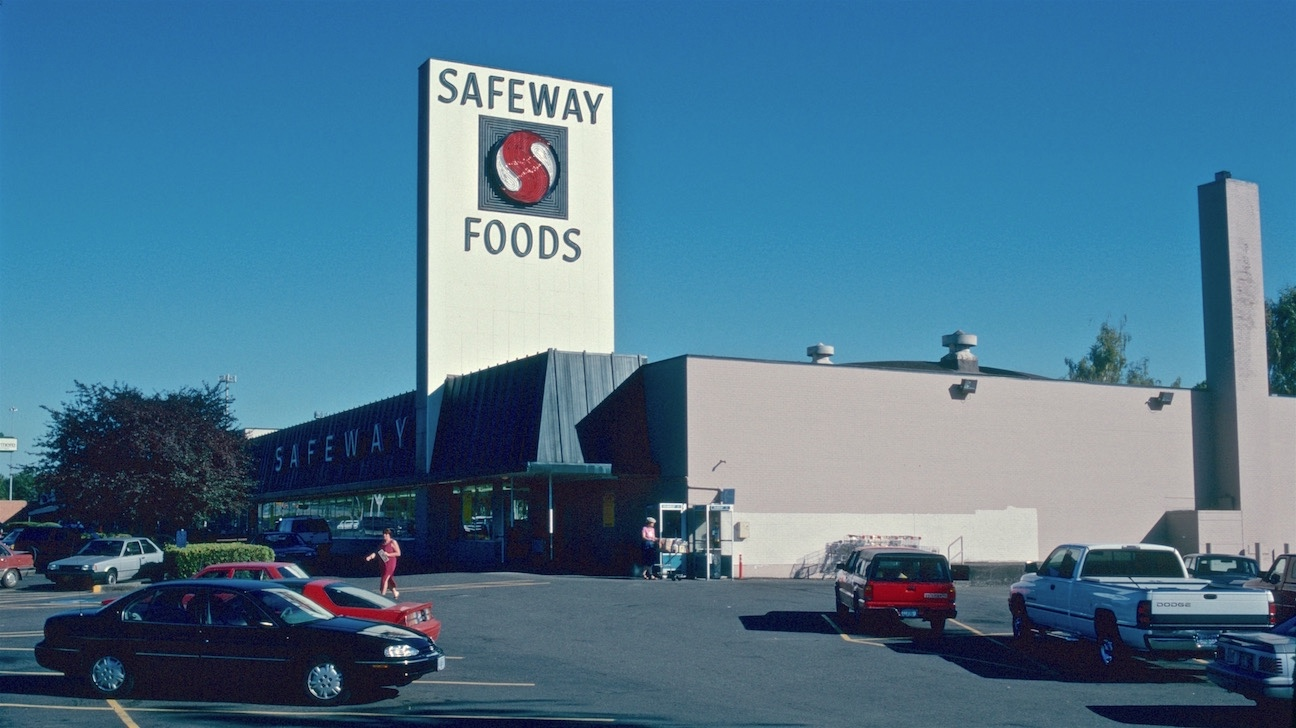
Cedar Hills Shopping Center in 1997, when the Safeway store was closing after 43 years of operation

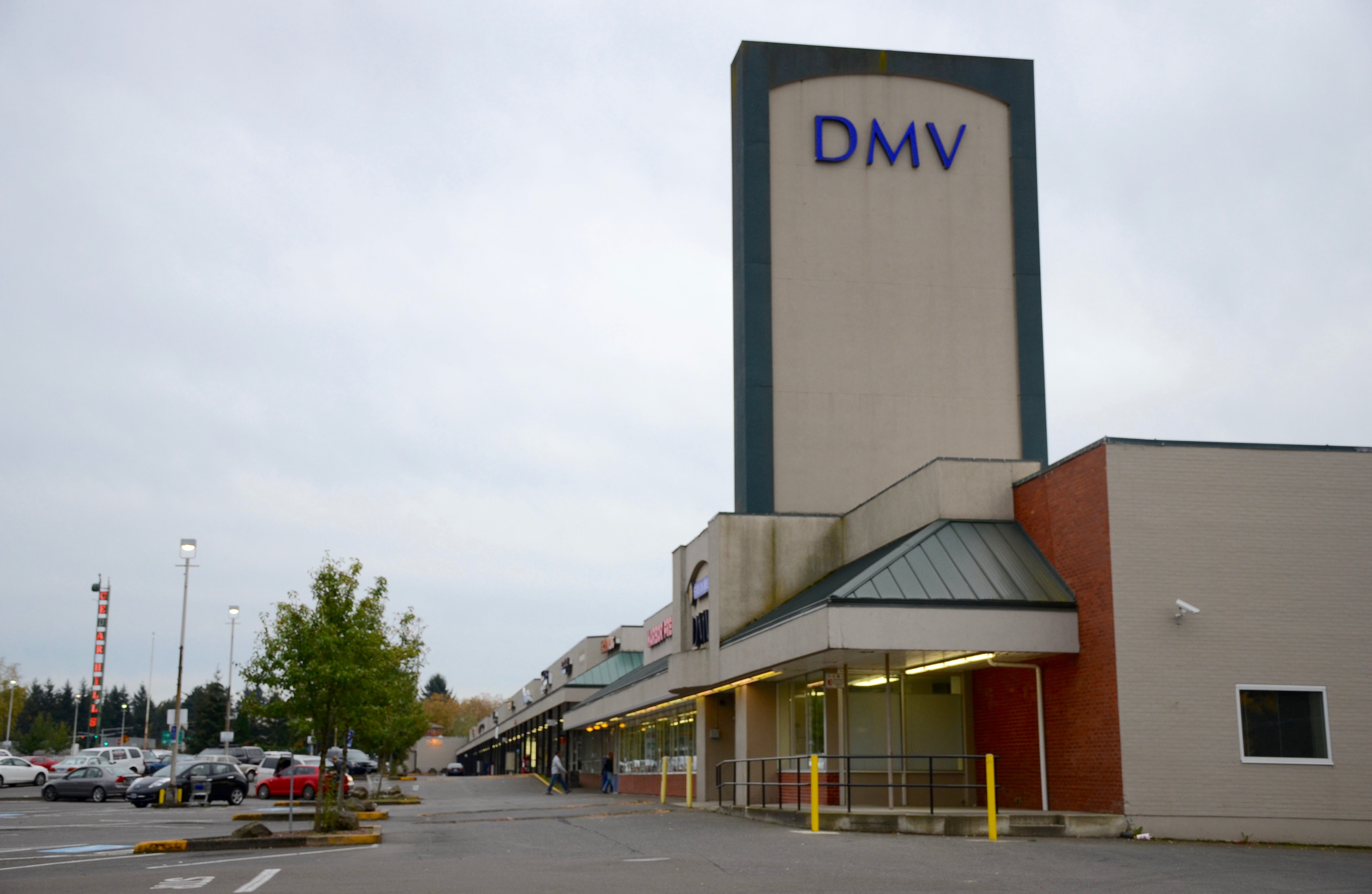
The center in 2016, with a DMV office in the former Safeway space

Construction of the planned shopping center began in 1954. Located immediately south of the Sunset Highway, at the northern end of the neighborhood, Cedar Hills Shopping Center opened in April 1955. It originally included a Safeway supermarket (opened in August 1954, months earlier than the remainder of the center), a Rodgers five-and-dime, a Sears catalog store, and several other shops, along with a bank and a gas station. The center's tall neon sign became a local landmark. In 1979, TriMet opened a bus transit center on Wilshire Street, behind the shopping center. Cedar Hills Transit Center remained in operation for almost 20 years, until replaced by the Sunset Transit Center – located immediately across the Sunset Highway (US 26) freeway from Cedar Hills Shopping Center – in 1998, with the opening of the Westside MAX line. The Sunset TC's construction included a long pedestrian bridge over the freeway, to provide access between the TriMet bus and MAX station and the Cedar Hills neighborhood. In 2009, the Oregon Department of Transportation opened a new Driver and Motor Vehicle Services Division (DMV) office in the Cedar Hills Shopping Center, serving as the DMV's Beaverton office, replacing one located on Allen Blvd. in Beaverton proper. Plans to redevelop most of the shopping center site were approved in 2022, and work began in April 2026.

== Geography ==
According to the United States Census Bureau, the neighborhood has a total area of 2.3 square miles (6.0 km^{2}), of which 2.3 square miles (6.0 km^{2}) is land and 0.43% is water.

== Demographics ==
Historical population
Census	Pop.	Note	%±
2020	8,379		—
U.S. Decennial Census

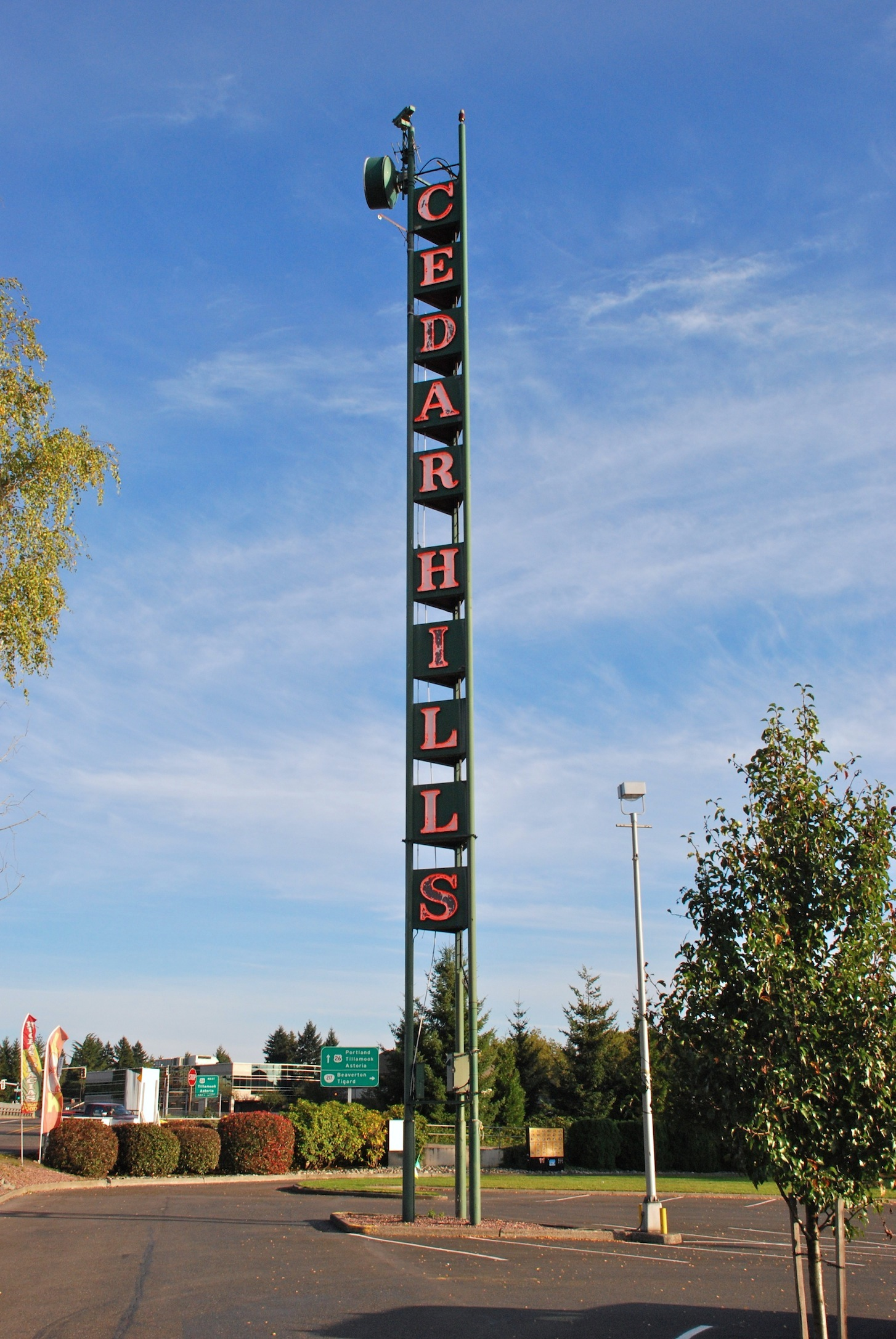
The neon sign tower at the Cedar Hills Shopping Center, a local landmark since the 1950s, was dismantled in 2026 as redevelopment of the site began.

As of the census of 2000, there were 8,949 people, 3,749 households, and 2,361 families residing in the neighborhood. The population density was 3,880.9 inhabitants per square mile (1,498.4/km^{2}). There were 3,926 housing units at an average density of 1,702.6 per square mile (657.4/km^{2}). The racial makeup of the CDP was 83.28% White, 1.32% African American, 0.57% Native American, 4.78% Asian, 0.35% Pacific Islander, 6.05% from other races, and 3.65% from two or more races. Hispanic or Latino of any race were 11.21% of the population.

There were 3,749 households, out of which 28.9% had children under the age of 18 living with them, 49.4% were married couples living together, 9.8% had a female householder with no husband present, and 37.0% were non-families. 29.0% of all households were made up of individuals, and 9.0% had someone living alone who was 65 years of age or older. The average household size was 2.39 and the average family size was 2.94.

In the neighborhood the population was spread out, with 23.0% under the age of 18, 7.7% from 18 to 24, 33.4% from 25 to 44, 23.4% from 45 to 64, and 12.5% who were 65 years of age or older. The median age was 36 years. For every 100 females, there were 98.4 males. For every 100 females age 18 and over, there were 96.8 males.

The median income for a household in the neighborhood was $48,200, and the median income for a family was $56,401. Males had a median income of $42,293 versus $29,922 for females. The per capita income for the CDP was $26,812. About 3.9% of families and 6.5% of the population were below the poverty line, including 7.8% of those under age 18 and 3.0% of those age 65 or over.

== Public services ==
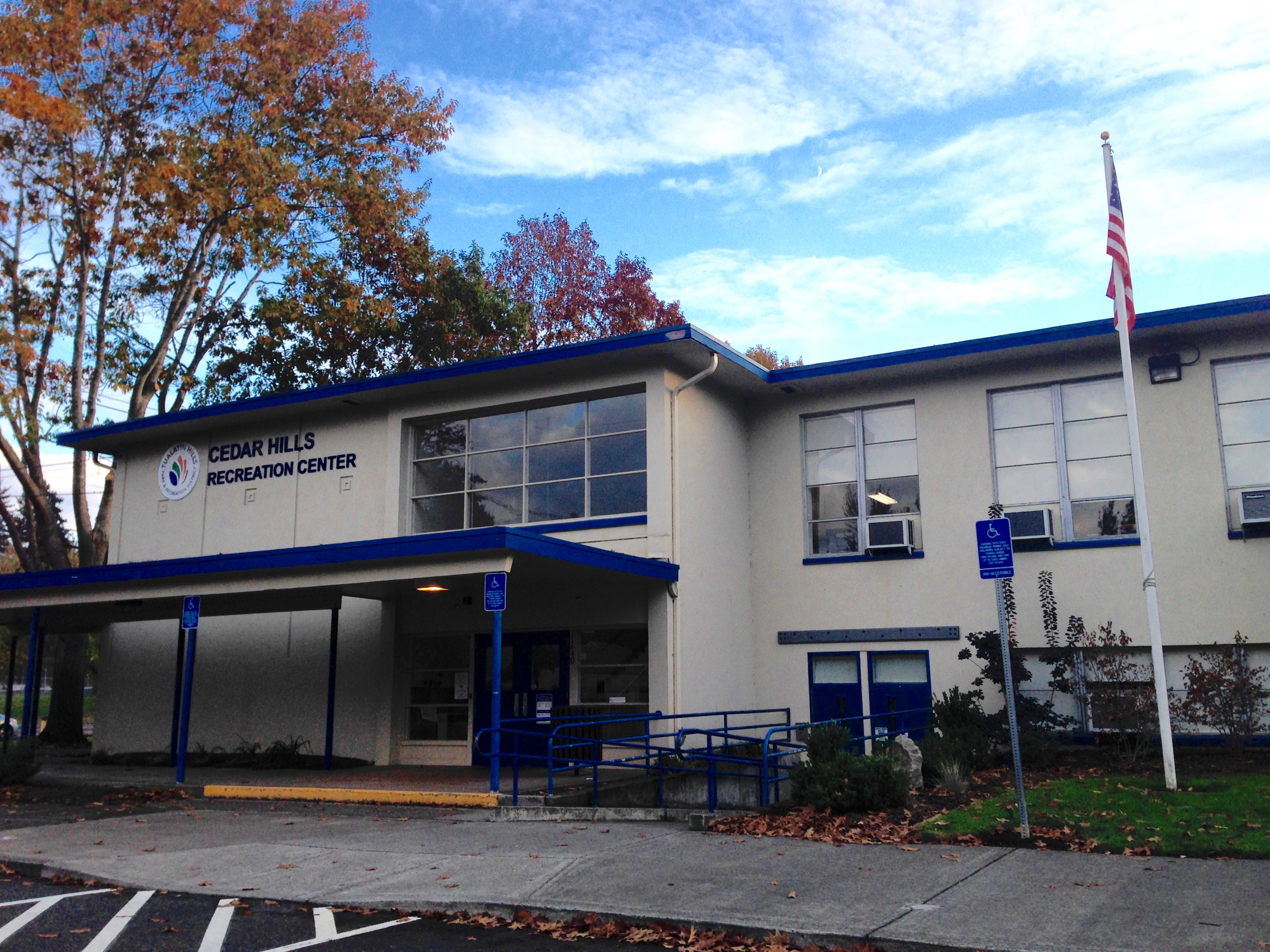
The former Cedar Hills Elementary School remains in use as a community center and recreation center.

=== Schools ===
Cedar Hills lies within the Beaverton School District.. Cedar Park Middle School and Barnes Elementary School are the only public schools located within the Cedar Hills CDP, but the area's residents are also served by Beaverton High School, Meadow Park Middle School, Ridgewood Elementary and William Walker Elementary. An October 2016 boundary change redirected Cedar Hills to fall under Beaverton High School's coverage area, in place of Sunset High School.

Previously, the area was also the site of Cedar Hills Elementary School, opened circa 1953-1954, at the intersection of SW Cedar Hills Blvd. and SW Park Way. That school closed in 1983, due to declining student enrollment districtwide at the time, and the building was leased to, and subsequently sold to, the Tualatin Hills Park & Recreation District, which repurposed it as the Cedar Hills Recreation Center.

=== Other services ===
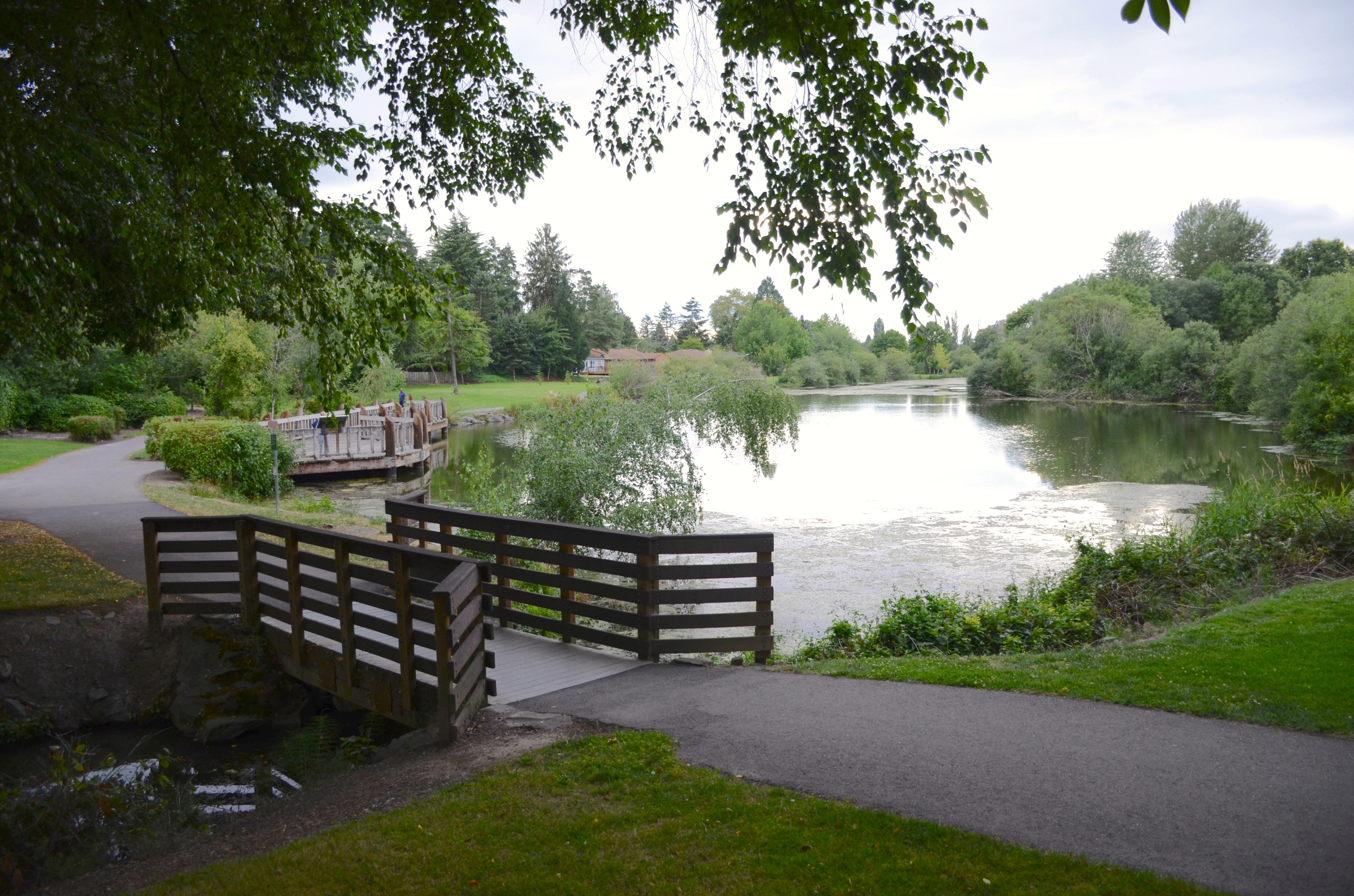
Commonwealth Lake

Fire protection and emergency medical services are provided through Tualatin Valley Fire and Rescue.

Cedar Hills is served by the Tualatin Hills Park & Recreation District (THPRD), which maintains several parks in the area–including the man-made 20.8-acre (8.4 ha) Commonwealth Lake Park. The Oregon Department of Fish & Wildlife regularly stocks the lake with trout, bass, and other assorted fish. THPRD also operates the Cedar Hills Recreation Center, a community center (not limited to Cedar Hills residents) located in a former elementary school.

== See also ==
- Bernard's Airport
- Cedar Hills Crossing – shopping center located on Cedar Hills Blvd., just south of Cedar Hills
- Cedar Mill – nearby area, with a similar name
