= Premium Picture Productions =

1920s movie studio in Beaverton, Oregon

Premium Picture Productions is a former movie studio located in Beaverton, Oregon, which was active in the early 1920s. It was founded in 1921, with J.J. Fleming as president and Dr. G.E. Watts and three others as directors of the corporation, and it opened its production lot in 1922. The company went out of business in late 1925. The studio produced approximately fifteen silent films, including the following:

- The Flash (1922)
- Crashing Courage (1923)
- Flames of Passion (1923)
- The Frame-Up (1923)
- The Power Divine (1923)
- The Range Patrol (1923)
- Scars of Hate (1923)
- The Vow of Vengeance (1923)
- The Way of the Transgressor (1923)
- Beaten (1924)
- Harbor Patrol (1924)
- The Trail of Vengeance (1924)
- Shackles of Fear (1924)
- Phantom Shadows (1925)
- The Fighting Parson (or The Fighting Romeo) (1925), starring Al Ferguson

Many of their films were directed by Harry Moody (also credited as H.G. Moody) and William James Craft.

== External links and references ==
- List of the studio's movies from the American Film Institute
- Premium Picture Productions at IMDB
- made in Oregon
