= Blue Star Donuts =

Donut store chain

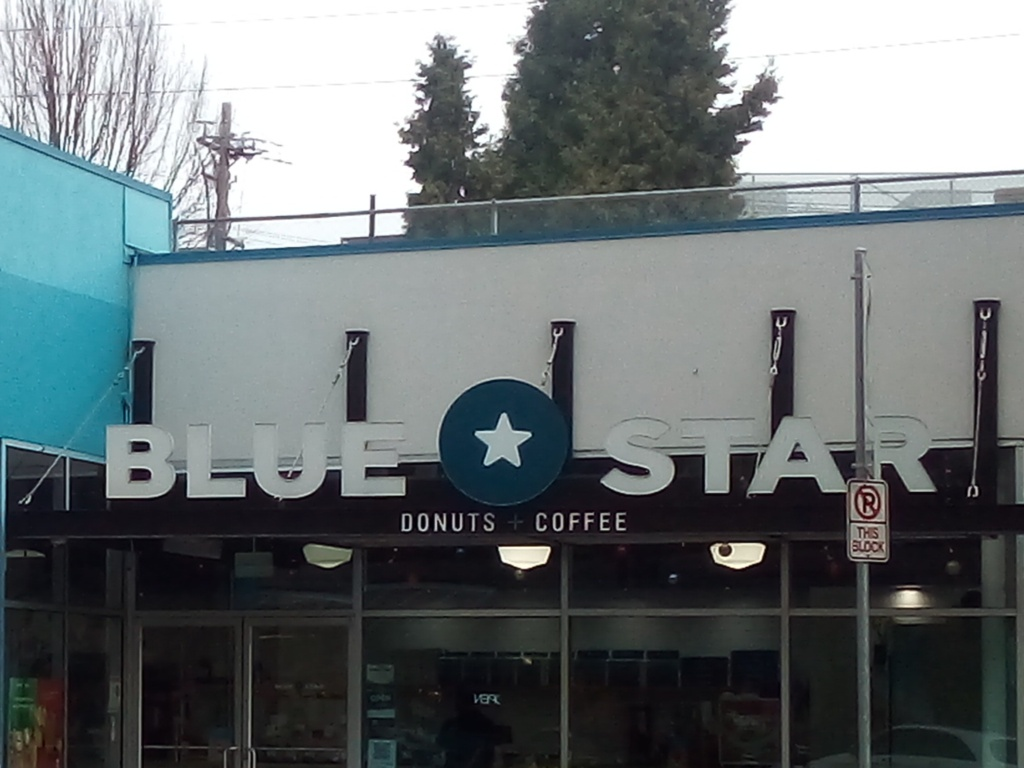
- Type: Chain
- Industry: Donuts
- Headquarters: Portland, Oregon
- Area served: United States
- Website: Official website

Blue Star Donuts is a small chain of donut stores with four locations in Portland, Oregon.

Blue star manufactures their donuts in central facility in Portland and distribute them to various locations instead of locating a fryer in each store.

== History ==
Blue Star opened its first location in 2012. It launched a CBD-infused donut in 2019. It went under a major downsizing in June 2020. It declared Chapter 11 bankruptcy in August 2020, but was reorganized and emerged from protection in December 2020.

All locations were temporarily closed in 2020 because of the COVID-19 pandemic, and began selling "limited edition" products in grocery stores.

American chef Andrew Zimmern visited for an episode of the Travel Channel series The Zimmern List.

It did have a presence in Los Angeles from 2015 until abrupt closure in July 2024. In January 2025, it again abruptly closed two additional locations in Portland, Oregon. Four locations remain as of June 2025.

== Reception ==
In 2024, Richard Foss of Easy Reader wrote "Their doughnuts were very pretty, very expensive, and not that good." In 2018, a group of staff writers from The Oregonian scored Blue Star 4.29 out of 10 whose donuts were priced at over $3.50 at the time. Blue Star was a runner-up in the Best Donut category of Willamette Week's annual 'Best of Portland' readers' poll in 2022 and 2024.

In 2025, USA Today listed blue star in the 9th place of 10 best donuts place as chosen by their editorial board.
