= Cedar Hills Crossing =

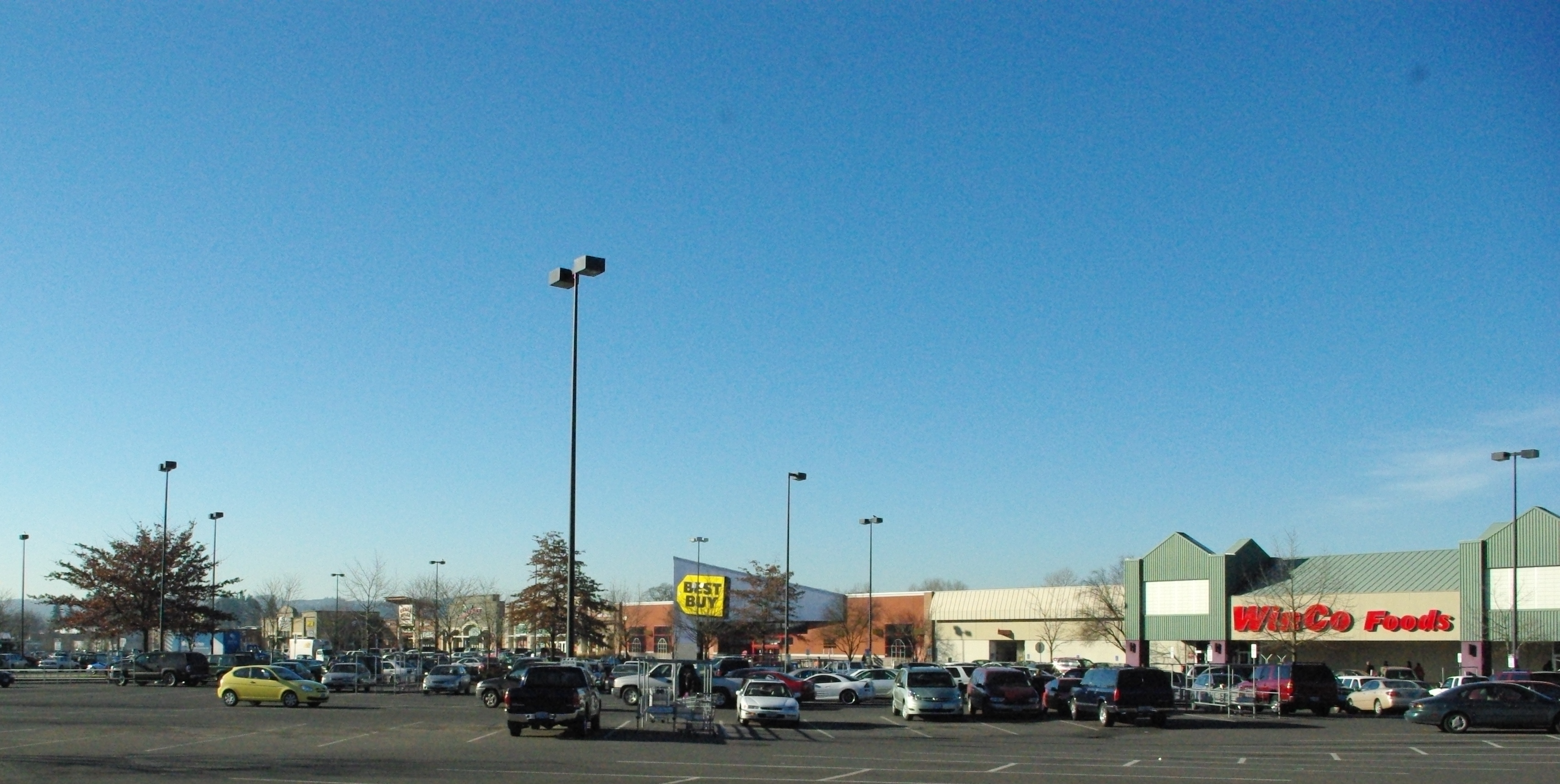
- Northeast corner
- Location: Beaverton, Oregon
- Coordinates: 45.497509°N 122.810985°W
- Opened: 1969 (as "Bernard's Beaverton Mall")
- Developer: C.E. John Company, Inc. (Vancouver, Washington)
- Floor area: 750,000 sq ft (70,000 m^{2})
- Website: cedarhillscrossing.com

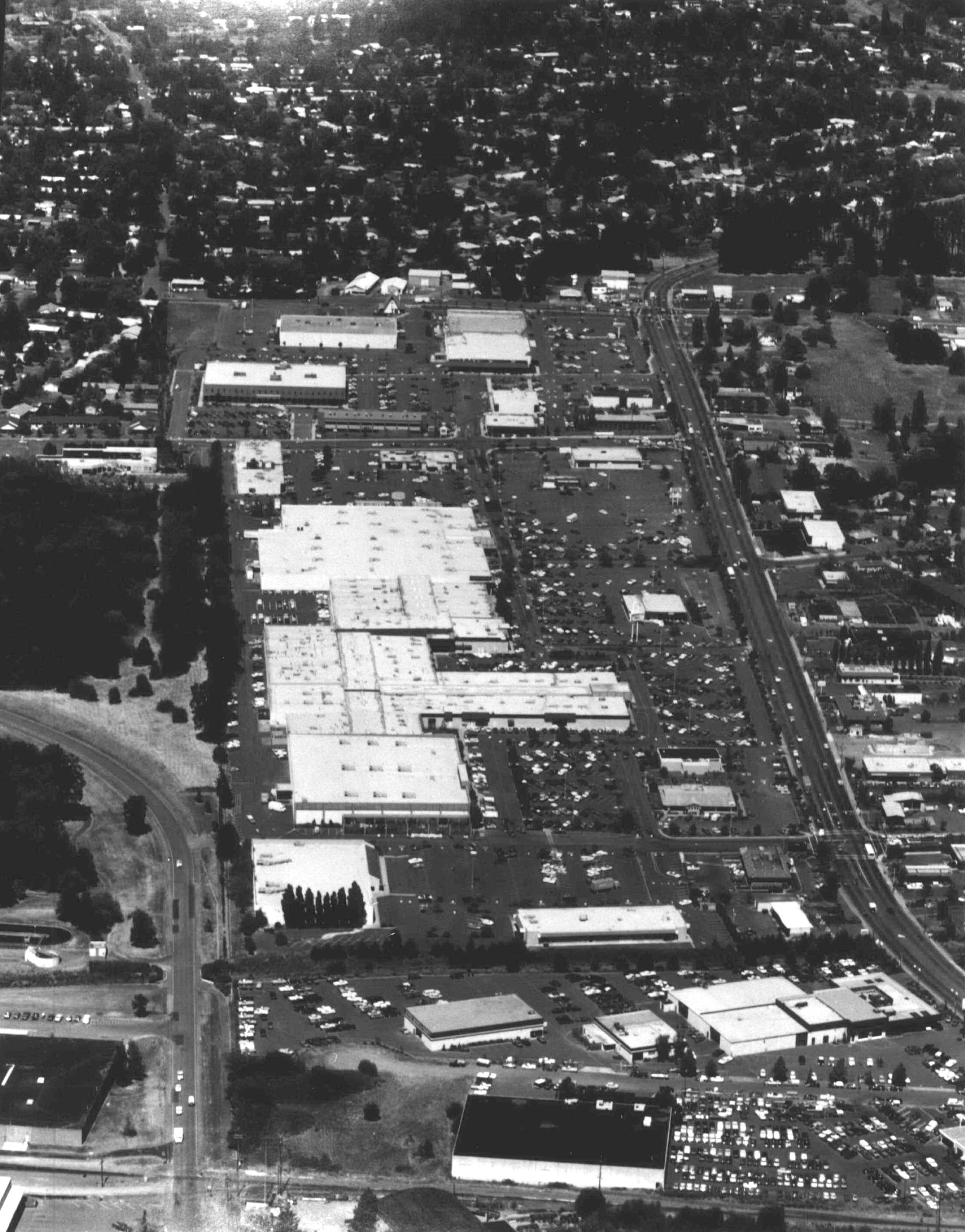
Aerial view (1984)

Cedar Hills Crossing, formerly Beaverton Mall, is a retail shopping center in the city of Beaverton, Oregon, United States. The center is notable in that it was the prior site of a historic airport, Bernard's Airport, where many of the early aircraft innovations of the 1920s and 1930s occurred. Cedar Hills Crossing has been in operation since 1969, and is located approximately between the intersection of SW Cedar Hills Boulevard and Walker Road and the intersection of SW Cedar Hills Boulevard and Hall Boulevard. The current name was adopted in September 2002 when C.E. John Company began the redevelopment of the Mall. Three extra mall entrances, new building facades and 40,000 square feet (3,700 m^{2}) of new retail space was involved in the redevelopment, including new restaurants and interior designs.

== History ==
Prior to the mall's construction, the site was a small airport known as Bernard's Airport. An underground chemical release at the site was discovered in the 1980s. Considerable analysis of this release, along with other on site environmental factors, has been conducted to provide for safety of mall patrons and area residents. At least through the period 1970 to 1990 (the interval when the release occurred) the center functioned in compliance with most local governmental standards for environmental regulation.

The mall's name was changed to Cedar Hills Crossing in the last stages of renovations and expansion that began in September 2002. In 2003, tenants and operators of the mall were successful in removing from the city's local street master plan a proposed Fairfield Street–Terman Road connection that would have cut through the shopping center's site.

A new 16-screen movie theatre was opened by Century Theatres in November 2004, and a food court was added at around the same time. Since 2006, the shopping center has included a branch of Powell's Books.

In 2016, developer C.E. John Co. announced a five-year, five-phase $70 million redevelopment plan for the center. Following this plan, sister company J.E. John Co. has developed 11 new retail buildings, alongside a two story concrete parking structure.

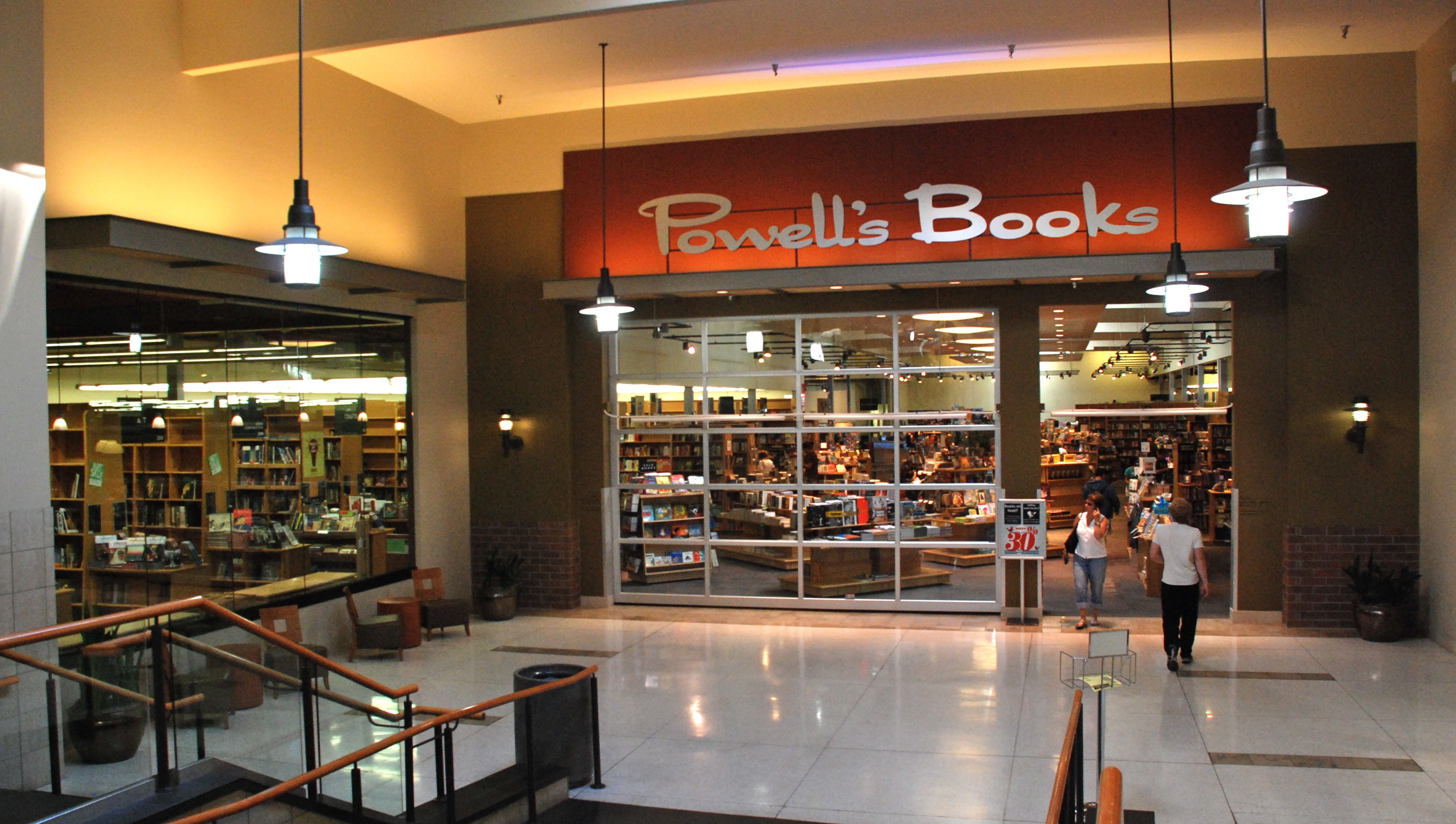
Powell's Books at Cedar Hills Crossing

== See also ==
- List of shopping malls in Oregon
