= List of nature centers in Oregon =

Oregon Nature Centers (Hover mouse over pog to popup clickable link)

This is a list of nature centers and environmental education centers in the state of Oregon.

To use the sortable tables: click on the icons at the top of each column to sort that column in alphabetical order; click again for reverse alphabetical order.

Name	Location	County	Region	Summary
Audubon Society of Portland	Portland	Multnomah	Portland metro	150 acres, adjacent to 5,170-acre Forest Park, includes classrooms, exhibits, wildlife care center
Cape Perpetua Interpretive Center	Yachats	Lincoln	Oregon Coast	Located in Siuslaw National Forest, daily nature programs, activities, exhibits
Cascades Raptor Center	Eugene	Lane	Oregon Coast	Nature center and wildlife hospital for raptors
Columbia Gorge Discovery Center & Museum	The Dalles	Wasco	North Central	54 acres, interpretive center of the Columbia River Gorge National Scenic Area, encompasses Wasco County Historical Museum with local history, natural history, Lewis and Clark Expedition, Ice Age exhibits
Cooper Mountain Nature Park	Beaverton	Washington	Portland metro	230 acres, operated by the Tualatin Hills Park & Recreation District
Corvallis Environmental Center	Corvallis	Benton	Willamette Valley	website, operates the Avery House Nature Center, sustainable community living
Coyote Trails' Nature Center	Medford	Jackson	Southern Oregon	website, operated by the Coyote Trails School of Nature on 7 acres in U.S. Cellular Community Park
Drift Creek Nature Center	Lincoln City	Lincoln	Oregon Coast	website, located in the Siuslaw National Forest, owned and operated by the Mennonite Camp Association of Oregon
The Environmental Center	Bend	Deschutes	Central Oregon	website, sustainability and community environmental issues
Jackson Bottom Wetlands Preserve	Hillsboro	Washington	Portland metro	725 acres, operated by the City, features Wetlands Education Center
John Inskeep Environmental Learning Center	Oregon City	Clackamas	Willamette Valley	website, 5 acres, operated by Clackamas Community College
Lost Valley Nature Center	Dexter	Lane	Oregon Coast	85 acres, environmental residential community with programs, trails
McGregor Park	Trail	Jackson	Southern Oregon	website, operated by the Bureau of Land Management, displays on Lost Creek Dam, area plants, wildlife, geology and cultural history
Nearby Nature	Eugene	Lane	Oregon Coast	website, environmental education programs in Alton Baker Park
North Mountain Park Nature Center	Ashland	Jackson	Southern Oregon	website, 40 acres, operated by the City
Rusk Ranch Nature Center	Cave Junction	Josephine	Southern Oregon	website, 50 acres
Siskiyou Field Institute	Selma	Josephine	Southern Oregon	website, field-based natural history classes
South Slough Interpretive Center	Salem	Coos	Oregon Coast	Marine life, birds, animals and plants of the South Slough National Estuarine Research Reserve
Straub Environmental Center	Salem	Marion	Willamette Valley	website, operated by the Friends of Straub Environmental Learning Center, nature and environmental education programs
Sunriver Nature Center	Sunriver	Deschutes	Central Oregon	website, operated by the planned residential and resort community, nature displays, live native animals, bird rehabilitation, trails, botanical garden
Tryon Creek State Natural Area	Portland	Multnomah	Portland metro	645 acres
Tualatin Hills Nature Park	Beaverton	Washington	Portland metro	222 acres, operated by the Tualatin Hills Park & Recreation District
Tualatin River National Wildlife Refuge	Sherwood	Washington	Portland metro	1,856-acre wetlands and lowlands sanctuary, features wildlife center with exhibits, viewing areas, nature programs
