= Cedar Mill, Oregon =

Unincorporated community in the state of Oregon, United States

- Census-designated place (CDP)
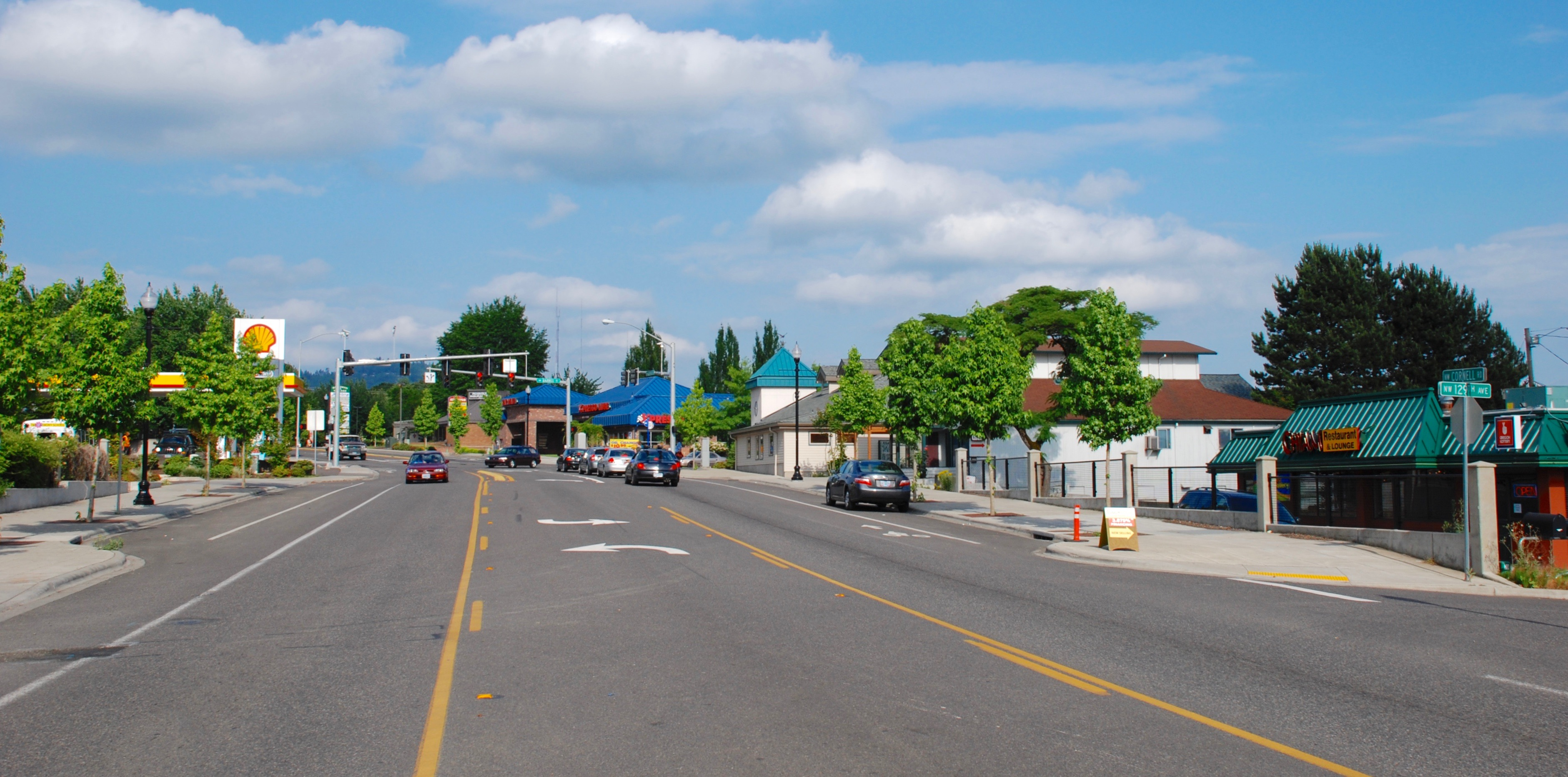
- Cornell Road & 129th Avenue

- Location of Cedar Mill, Oregon
- Coordinates: 45°32′08″N 122°48′02″W
- Country: United States
- State: Oregon
- County: Washington
- Place name established (post office opened): 1874
- Named for: sawmill (in operation c. 1855–1891)

Area
  - Total: 3.33 sq mi (8.62 km^{2})
  - Land: 3.33 sq mi (8.62 km^{2})
  - Water: 0 sq mi (0.00 km^{2})
- Elevation: 522 ft (159 m)

Population (2020)
  - Total: 17,259
  - Density: 5,185.0/sq mi (2,001.95/km^{2})
- Time zone: UTC-8 (Pacific (PST))
  - Summer (DST): UTC-7 (PDT)
- ZIP codes: 97229, 97291
- Area codes: 503 and 971
- FIPS code: 41-12150
- GNIS feature ID: 2408001

Cedar Mill is a suburb in the Portland, Oregon metropolitan area of the United States; it is a census-designated place and an unincorporated community in Washington County, north of U.S. Route 26 and west of the Willamette Stone. It received its name from a sawmill on Cedar Mill Creek, which cut Western Redcedars that were once the dominant tree in the area. The mill's pond was near the intersection of 119th and Cornell Road, and could still be seen into the 1960s, although the mill itself had ceased operating in 1891. The name was established in 1874 with the opening of a U.S. post office named Cedar Mill. As of the 2020 census, the community population was 17,259.

== History ==
=== Early history ===
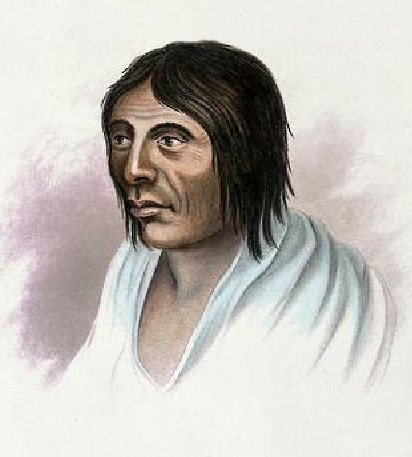
The Atfalati were the original inhabitants of the area.

Before white settlement, the land was inhabited by the Atfalati, a subgroup of the Kalapuya, called the "Tualatin" or "Wapato Lake Indians" by settlers. Nearby Beaverton was known by the Natives as "Cha Kepi", meaning "Place of the Beaver". While in 1782 the native population exceeded several thousand, due to diseases brought by the settlers sixty years later, in 1842, the population was merely six hundred. By 1890, the members of the tribe had been reduced to 28 and the last known speaker of the Tualatin language, Louis Kenoyer, died in 1936. Early settlers in the area would recall Native Americans passing through the area, visiting their former lands.

Most of the land in the area, as was typical in the Tualatin Valley, was settled in accord with the Donation Land Claim Act of 1850. Pioneer Samuel Walters was the first white settler to arrive in the area, doing so in 1847. William Cornell, namesake of Cornell Road, settled near what is now the easternmost part of Cedar Mill with his wife Emily in 1852. The area became a school district in 1856.

The sawmill was established in 1859 by John Halsey Jones and his father, Justus, and was the "first organized business" in what is now Cedar Mill. Plans for the mill, which was located on the south side of Cornell Road at McDaniel Road (now N.W. 119th Avenue), were established as early as 1855 by the 23-year old Jones. The Jones Sawmill was sold in December 1869 to John Quincy Adams Young and William Everson, becoming the Young–Everson Mill. It was renamed the Young Brothers Sawmill after J.Q.A. Young's sons Linc and Jasper acquired it. It ceased operation in 1891 and was abandoned in 1892.

Many of Cedar Mill's early settlers were Irish Catholics. Thomas and Ann Leahy reached the Portland area in 1852 and in 1865 the Leahys, now including their infant son John, moved into a house on present-day Leahy Road, the family's namesake. Thomas died in 1874, and Ann in 1913. Following Ann Leahy's death, the property was divided among John and his brother Hugh. After their deaths in logging accidents in 1929 and 1940 respectively, the property continued in the family and descendants of the Leahy family continue to reside there today. Owen and Mary Murray, the namesake of Murray Road, moved to Oregon in the early 1880s and established a 120-acre farm. Their son Joseph Murray sold the farm due to debts brought on by the Great Depression in 1936.

=== Mill and post office ===
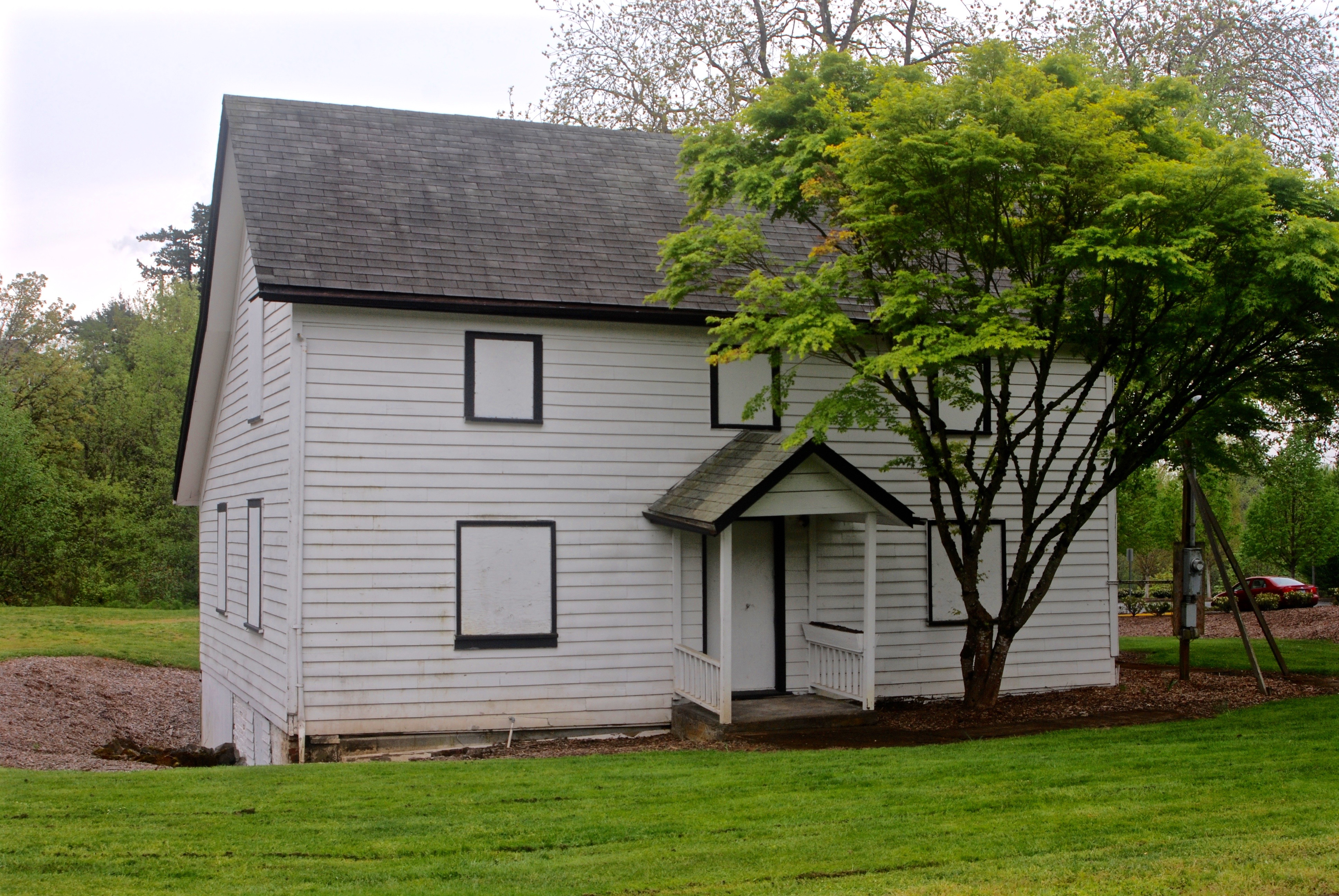
Historic John and Elizabeth Young House in Cedar Mill, 2015

According to Oregon Geographic Names, a "Cedar Mill" post office was established in 1874, in the John Quincy Adams Young House, built in 1869, which still stands on Cornell Road and is owned by the Tualatin Hills Park & Recreation District. The name was chosen by Young, who had "been commissioned to establish a post office in the area" and been named the first postmaster. The Young–Everson sawmill, specializing in cedar products, was still the only business operating in the area at the time and was also located directly adjacent to the post office, making "Cedar Mill" a logical choice for the name of the new postal station. Around the same time, in 1874, Young retired from milling, sold the mill to Everson, and moved his family into a new, larger house on the north side of Cornell Road, just across from the 1869-built house that was now being used as a post office. Along with the post office, Young also operated a small store on the ground floor of his former house. In 1976, the Russell family of Cedar Mill had owned the house since 1914.

John Q. A. Young served as Cedar Mill postmaster until December 1881. His successor, George Reeves, moved the post office in 1882 to a new general store that Reeves opened in that year, located just northwest of the intersection of Barnes and Cornell Roads. The Cedar Mill post office, always located within a store, was moved two more times before closing on July 3, 1904. The final stamp cancelled at the post office was owned in 1976 by Bernard P. Young, a descendant of John and Elizabeth Young.

=== 20th century ===
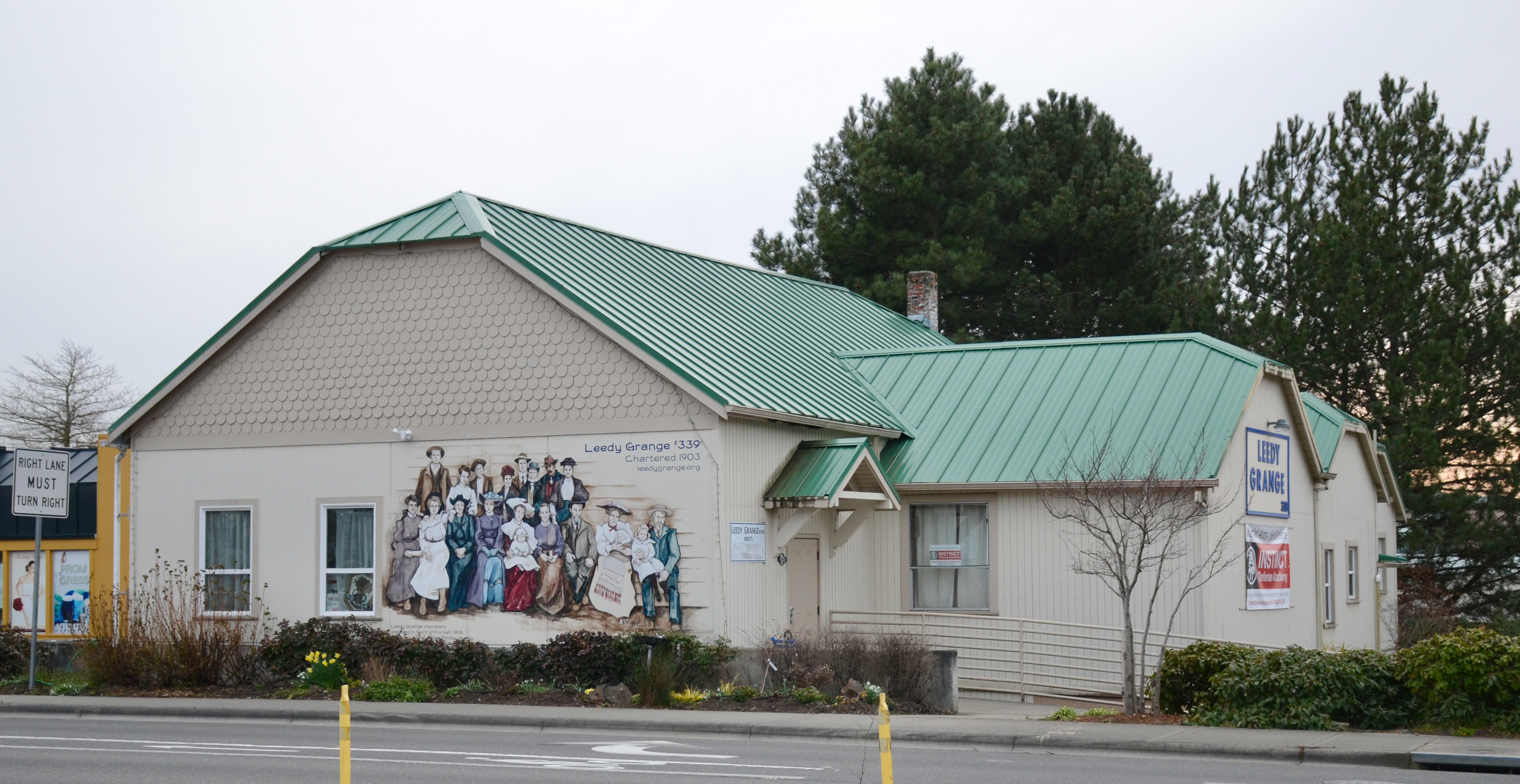
Leedy Grange

The present-day Leedy Grange #339 building, near the corner of Saltzman and Cornell Roads and near the Cedar Mill Library, was built in 1900 (according to Leedy Grange 1903). It originally housed a Modern Woodmen organization; however, in 1913 (1906 according to the Grange) the building was sold to the Leedy Grange, and the second story removed. The monthly Cedar Mill Flea Market was held at the grange the first Saturday of each month but was discontinued. The first Flea Market was held in June 2010.

Public transit service to Cedar Mill was operated in the 1940s by Tualatin Valley Stages, which after 1953 became Tualatin Valley Buses, Inc.–part of a consortium of privately owned companies known as the "Blue Bus" lines. It continued to serve the area through the 1960s, until TriMet took over the Blue Bus lines in 1970.

A Cedar Mill Heritage Quilt was created in the summer of 1976 by 15 local women. It detailed various aspects of Cedar Mill history. Former U.S. Senator Maurine Neuberger declared the winner of the quilting competition in September 1976.

== Geography ==
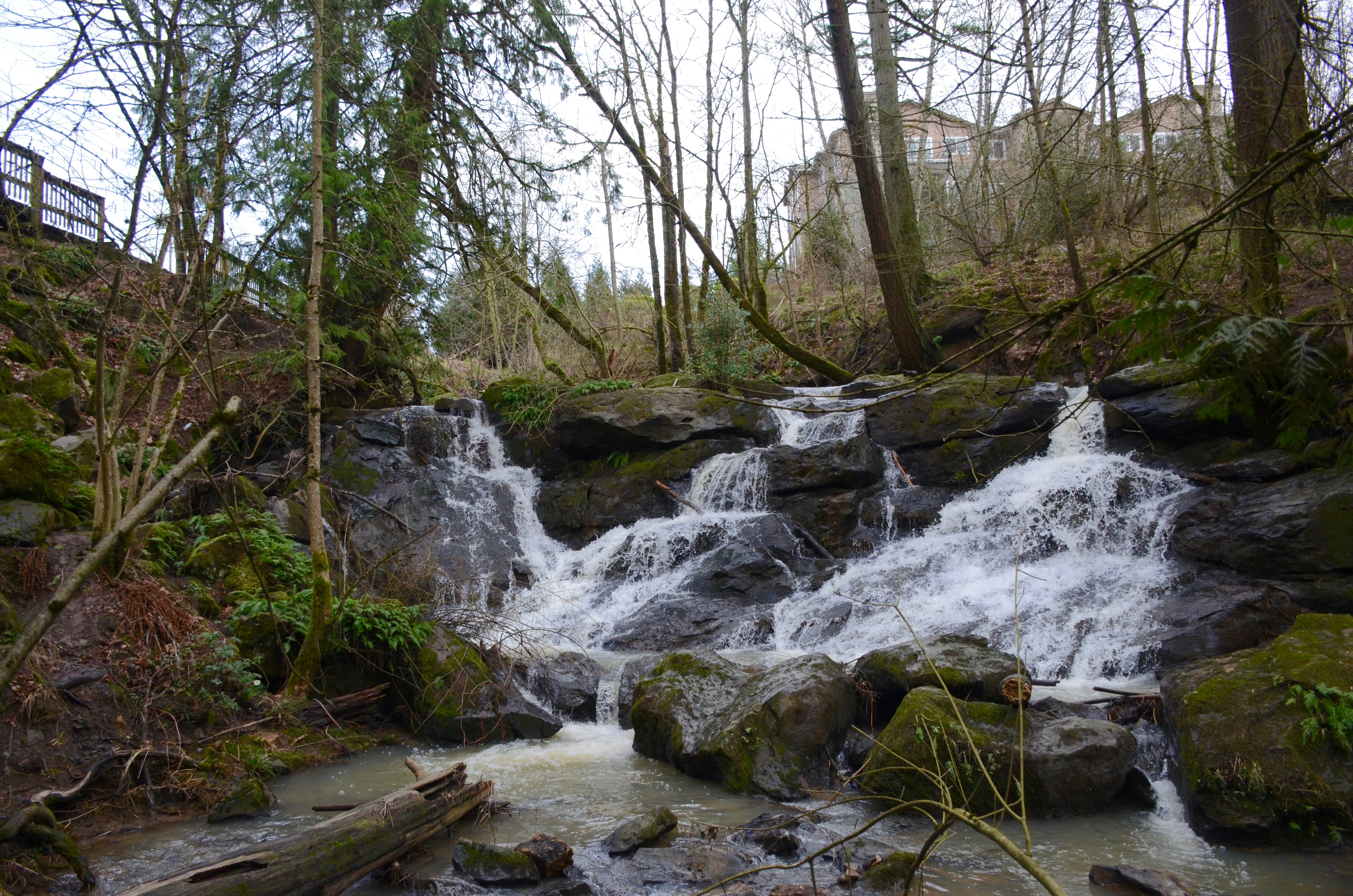
Cedar Mill Falls

According to the United States Census Bureau, the CDP has a total area of 3.7 square miles (9.6 km^{2}), all land. The appropriately named Cedar Mill Creek flows through the area. The creek begins its course in the Forest Heights neighborhood in northwest Multnomah County, then passes through Cedar Mill before flowing into Beaverton Creek in Tualatin Hills Nature Park. North Johnson Creek, another waterway in the area, begins south of Cedar Mill Creek and joins the main stream at the Nike World Campus. Cedar Mill Falls is the area's only waterfall, flowing near the Cedar Mill Greenway and JQA Young House. The waterfall, formerly used to provide power for the mill, is a 32-foot high basaltic rock formation. The Sue Conger Memorial Boardwalk, opened in June 2013, allows visitors of all abilities to view the falls. The only lake in the area is Hartung Lake, in the Hartung Farms neighborhood. Johnson Creek also flows through the area.

== Demographics ==
Historical population
Census	Pop.	Note	%±
2020	17,259		—
U.S. Decennial Census

=== 2020 census ===
As of the 2020 census, Cedar Mill had a population of 17,259. The median age was 39.7 years. 26.2% of residents were under the age of 18 and 13.4% of residents were 65 years of age or older. For every 100 females there were 98.5 males, and for every 100 females age 18 and over there were 96.1 males age 18 and over.

100.0% of residents lived in urban areas, while 0.0% lived in rural areas.

There were 6,178 households in Cedar Mill, of which 40.3% had children under the age of 18 living in them. Of all households, 64.3% were married-couple households, 12.3% were households with a male householder and no spouse or partner present, and 18.2% were households with a female householder and no spouse or partner present. About 16.7% of all households were made up of individuals and 6.3% had someone living alone who was 65 years of age or older.

There were 6,388 housing units, of which 3.3% were vacant. The homeowner vacancy rate was 0.7% and the rental vacancy rate was 5.5%.

Racial composition as of the 2020 census
Race	Number	Percent
White	11,423	66.2%
Black or African American	255	1.5%
American Indian and Alaska Native	58	0.3%
Asian	3,105	18.0%
Native Hawaiian and Other Pacific Islander	55	0.3%
Some other race	447	2.6%
Two or more races	1,916	11.1%
Hispanic or Latino (of any race)	1,283	7.4%

=== 2000 census ===
As of the 2000 census, there were 12,597 people, 4,723 households, and 3,428 families residing in the CDP. The population density was 3,388.3 inhabitants per square mile (1,308.2/km^{2}). There were 4,951 housing units at an average density of 1,331.7 per square mile (514.2/km^{2}). The racial makeup of the CDP was 85.42% White, 0.86% African American, 0.41% Native American, 7.47% Asian, 0.21% Pacific Islander, 2.70% from other races, and 2.94% from two or more races. Hispanic or Latino of any race were 6.09% of the population.

There were 4,723 households, out of which 39.4% had children under the age of 18 living with them, 60.8% were married couples living together, 8.3% had a female householder with no husband present, and 27.4% were non-families. 21.0% of all households were made up of individuals, and 4.3% had someone living alone who was 65 years of age or older. The average household size was 2.67 and the average family size was 3.12.

In the CDP, the population was spread out, with 28.4% under the age of 18, 6.9% from 18 to 24, 31.1% from 25 to 44, 25.5% from 45 to 64, and 8.1% who were 65 years of age or older. The median age was 36 years. For every 100 females, there were 99.7 males. For every 100 females age 18 and over, there were 97.0 males.

The median income for a household in the CDP was $65,730, and the median income for a family was $79,529. Males had a median income of $62,901 versus $36,369 for females. The per capita income for the CDP was $33,555. About 4.7% of families and 6.7% of the population were below the poverty line, including 7.4% of those under age 18 and 5.0% of those age 65 or over.

== Infrastructure and services ==
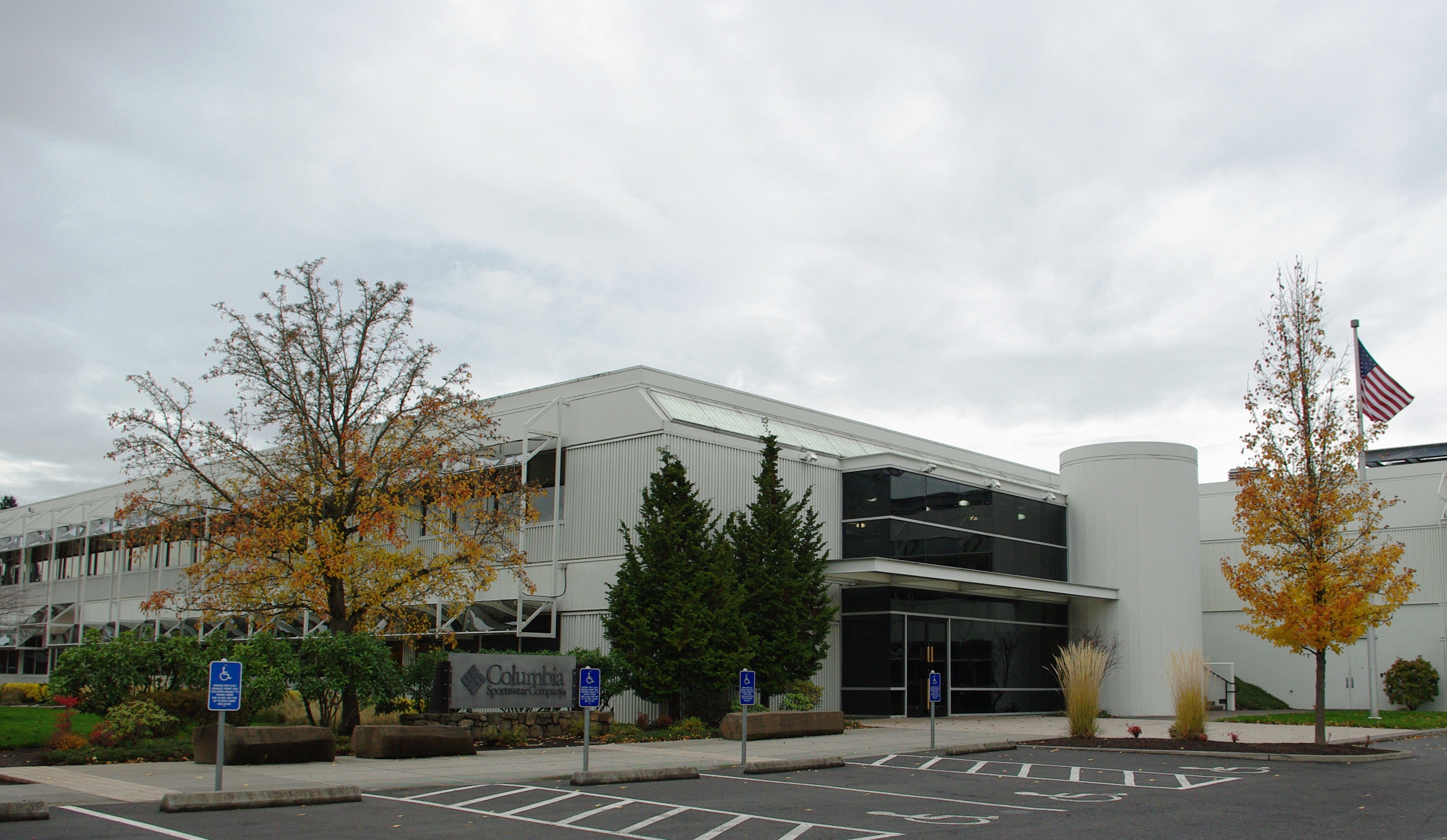
The headquarters for Columbia Sportswear are located in Cedar Mill.

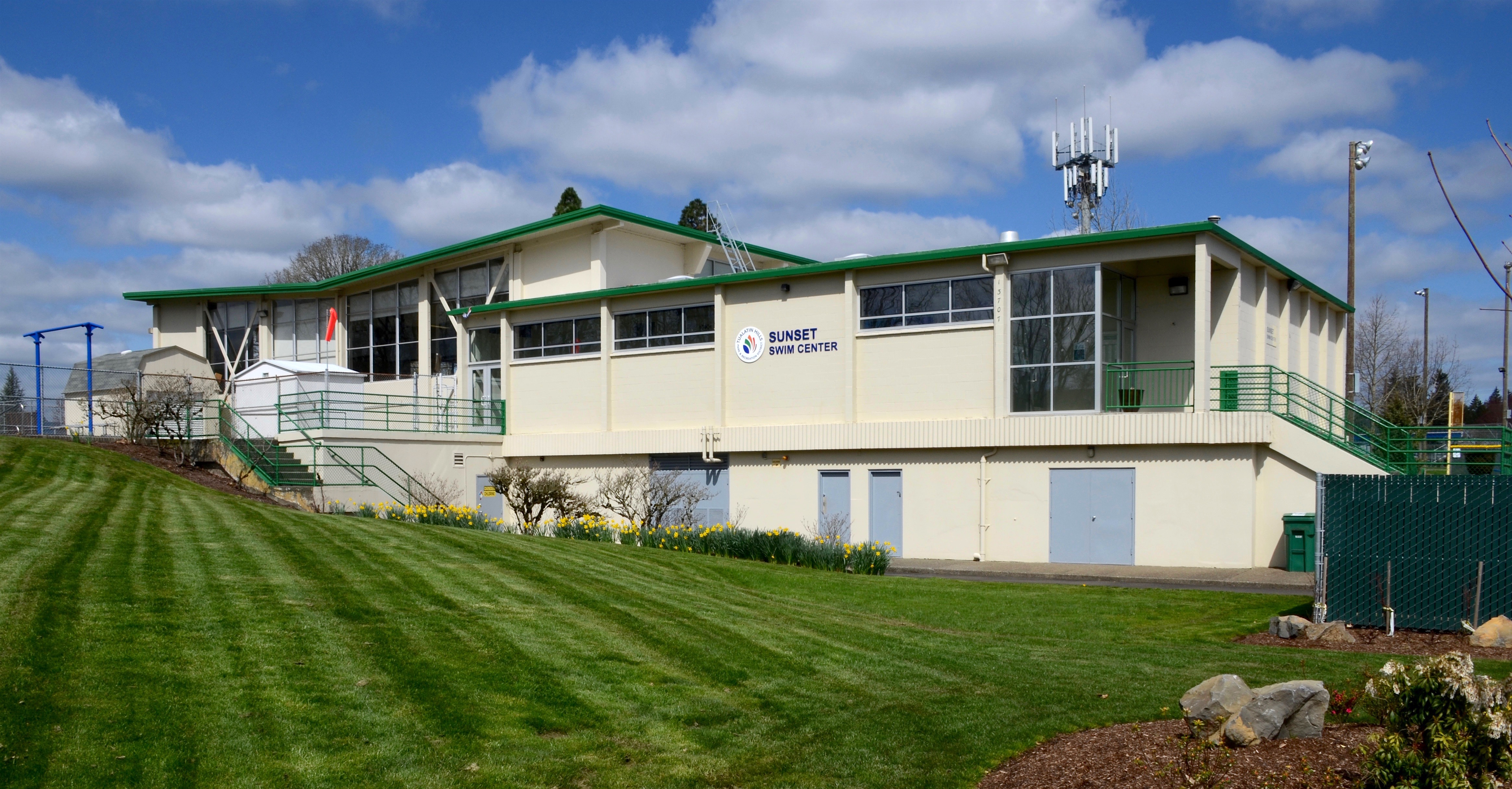
Sunset Swim Center, located adjacent to Sunset High School

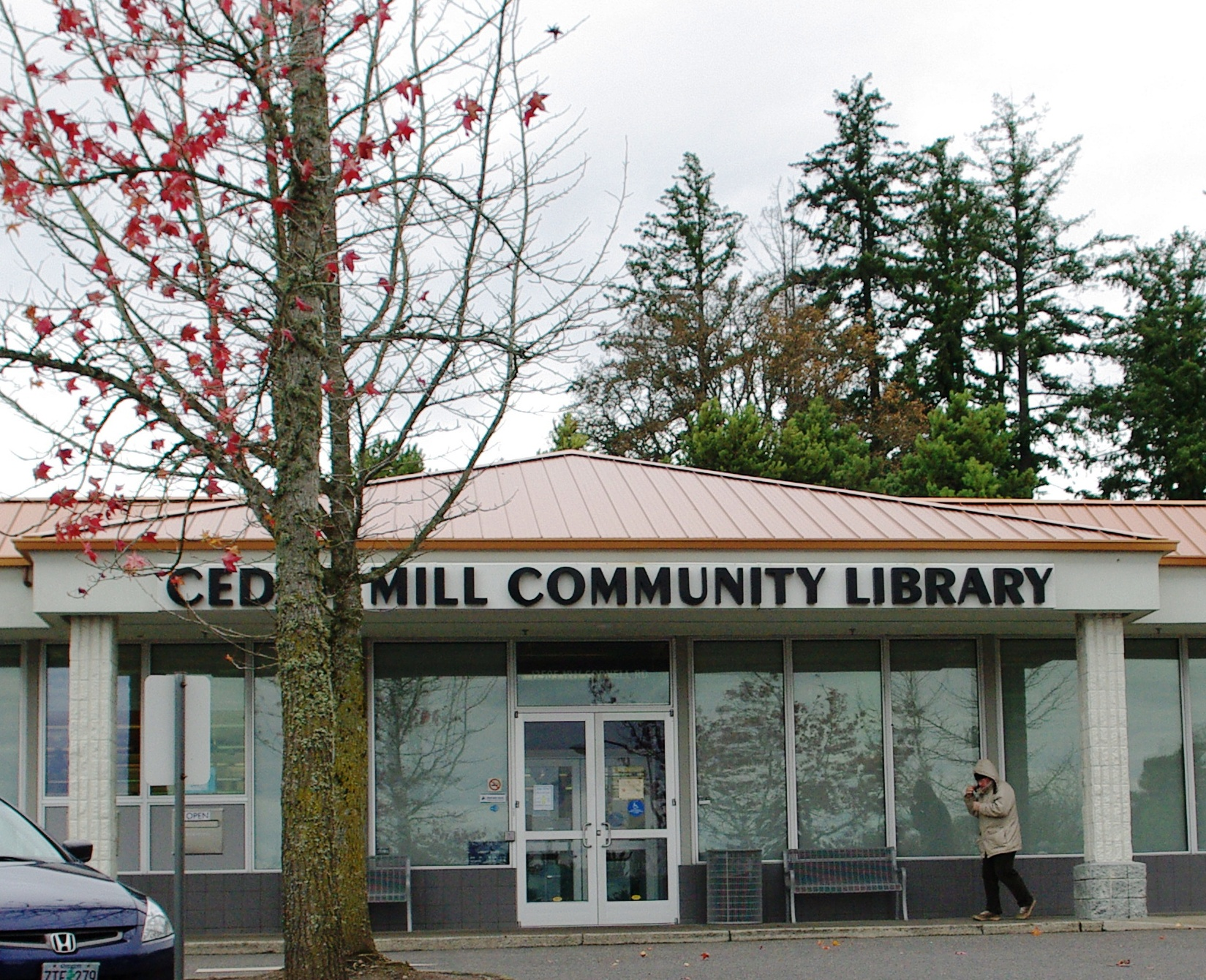
Cedar Mill Community Library

Fire protection and EMS services are provided through Tualatin Valley Fire and Rescue. Cedar Mill is served by the Tualatin Hills Park & Recreation District (THPRD), which maintains several parks and a few nature trails in the area, as well as the Sunset Swim Center (public swimming pool adjacent to and used by Sunset High School). Among parks is Cedar Mill Park.

Like all areas in the Portland metro area, Cedar Mill residents receive The Oregonian. Virginia Bruce operates the Cedar Mill News, a monthly newsletter running since January 2003. The Cedar Mill News was known as The Milltowner in its first edition, but by February 2003 had been changed to its present form, the Cedar Mill News. A local business association known as the Cedar Mill Business Association is involved in the area.

The so-called "downtown" of the CDP is located along Cornell Road from approximately Sunset High School to just past the intersection with Saltzman Road.

=== Library ===
A non-profit organization named the Cedar Mill Community Library Association (founded in 1974) opened the area's first public library in 1976, located in a shopping center at the intersection of Cornell Road and Saltzman Road (the Milltowner Shopping Center). Following expansions in 1978, 1988 and 2001, the Cedar Mill Community Library now occupies 24,500 square feet (2,280 m^{2}) of space. The current site is in a former Rodgers store, which closed in 1988 and was remodeled for the library, which previously had been located in much smaller space in another building in the same shopping center. The library was expanded in 2000–2001 through construction of a new two-story addition at the west end. The Library Association operates both the Cedar Mill and Bethany libraries.

=== Schools ===
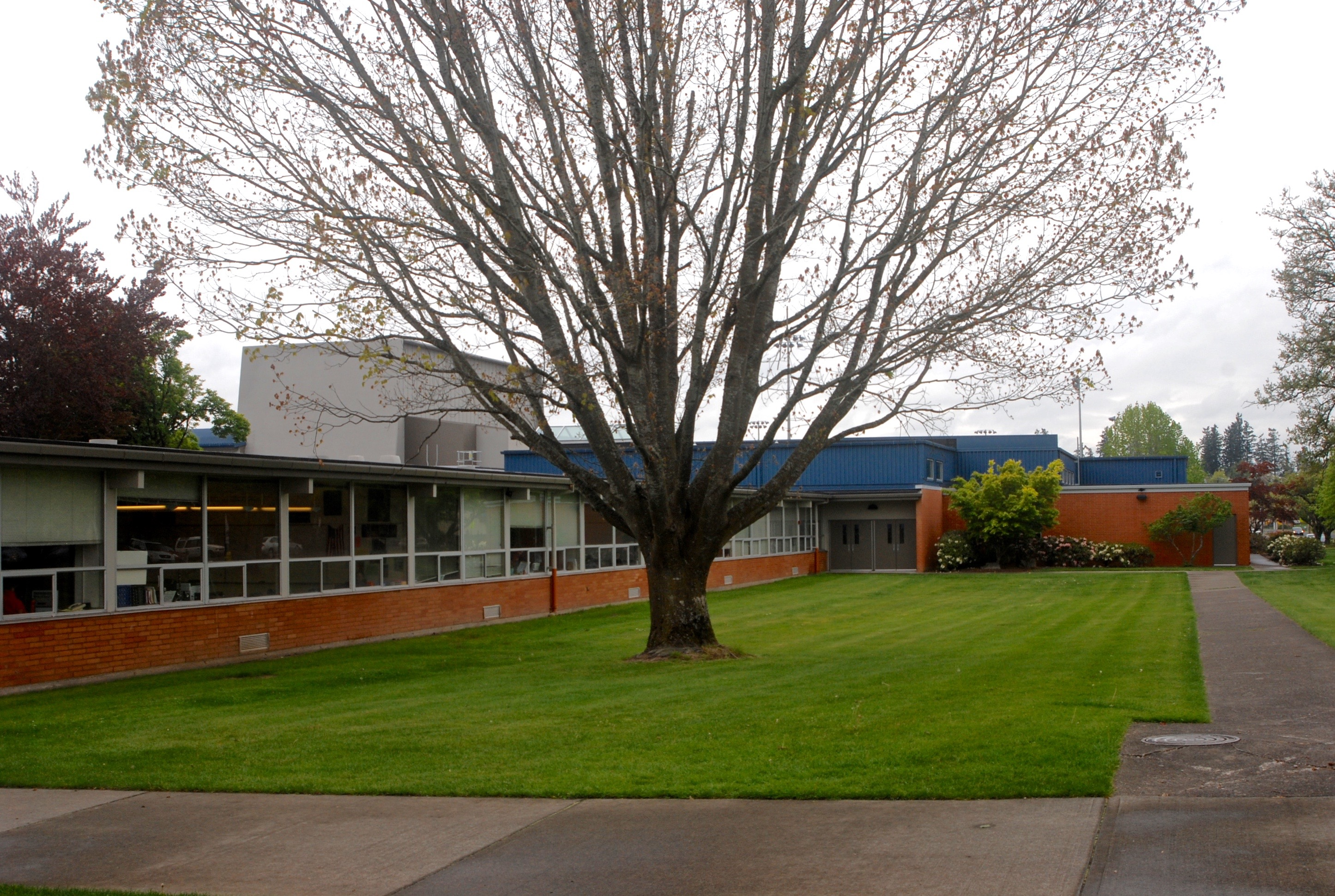
Sunset High School is located within the historic Cedar Mill area, but since 1999 the portion of the Cedar Mill CDP it occupies has been within Beaverton.

The school district covering the CDP is Beaverton School District 48J

Public schools which have attendance boundaries covering the Cedar Mill CDP (as of 2020) include the following schools. Elementary schools include Bonny Slope (in the CDP), Cedar Mill (in the CDP), Findley, and Terra Linda (in the CDP). Middle schools with sections of Cedar Mill in their boundaries include Tumwater and Cedar Park, both in Beaverton. Sunset High School is the public high school with Cedar Mill in its attendance boundary.

In the 1990 U.S. census, the land containing Sunset HS was in the Cedar Mill CDP. In 1999, the area with the school was annexed by the City of Beaverton.

Private schools include Catlin Gabel School, Prince of Peace Lutheran School, and St. Pius X Catholic School (of the Roman Catholic Archdiocese of Portland in Oregon).

=== School history ===
The first school district serving Cedar Mill, along with nearby Bethany, the Union School District (District 6), was established in 1856. The first school, serving grades 1 through 8, was built on land donated by pioneer Samuel Walters. The one-room Union School building, built in 1884 and located on what is now N.W. 143rd Avenue adjacent to the Union Cemetery, was replaced by a new two-room building on the same site in 1901, and the school remained in operation until 1948. District 6 was divided twice in the 1880s, with the eastern portion becoming the new Cedar Mill School District in 1883 and the northwestern portion becoming the Bethany School District in 1887 (serving the Bethany and Rock Creek areas, not Cedar Mill). The Union and Bethany districts consolidated in 1948, renamed as Sunset Valley School District. In 1960, the Cedar Mill and Sunset Valley Districts were absorbed by a greatly expanded Beaverton School District (District 48).

Another former school in the area was Sunset Valley Elementary School, which was built in 1948 to replace Union School and was located on Murray Road immediately north of Sunset Highway. In 1979, shortly before the school's closure in spring 1980, the building was acquired by Electro Scientific Industries (whose main campus was located nearby) and used as ESI's administrative headquarters until the mid-1990s, when it was razed and replaced by a Home Depot store.

== Notable people ==
- Aparna Brielle, actress
- Luis Palau, evangelist
- Mike Remmers, NFL Player
- Katee Sackhoff, Actress

== See also ==
- Cedar Hills, Oregon – nearby area with a similar name

== Works cited ==
- Brody, Linda S.; Olson, Nancy A. (1978). Cedar Mill History. LCCN 78073338.
