= John Quincy Adams and Elizabeth Young House =

Historic house in Oregon, United States

- U.S. National Register of Historic Places
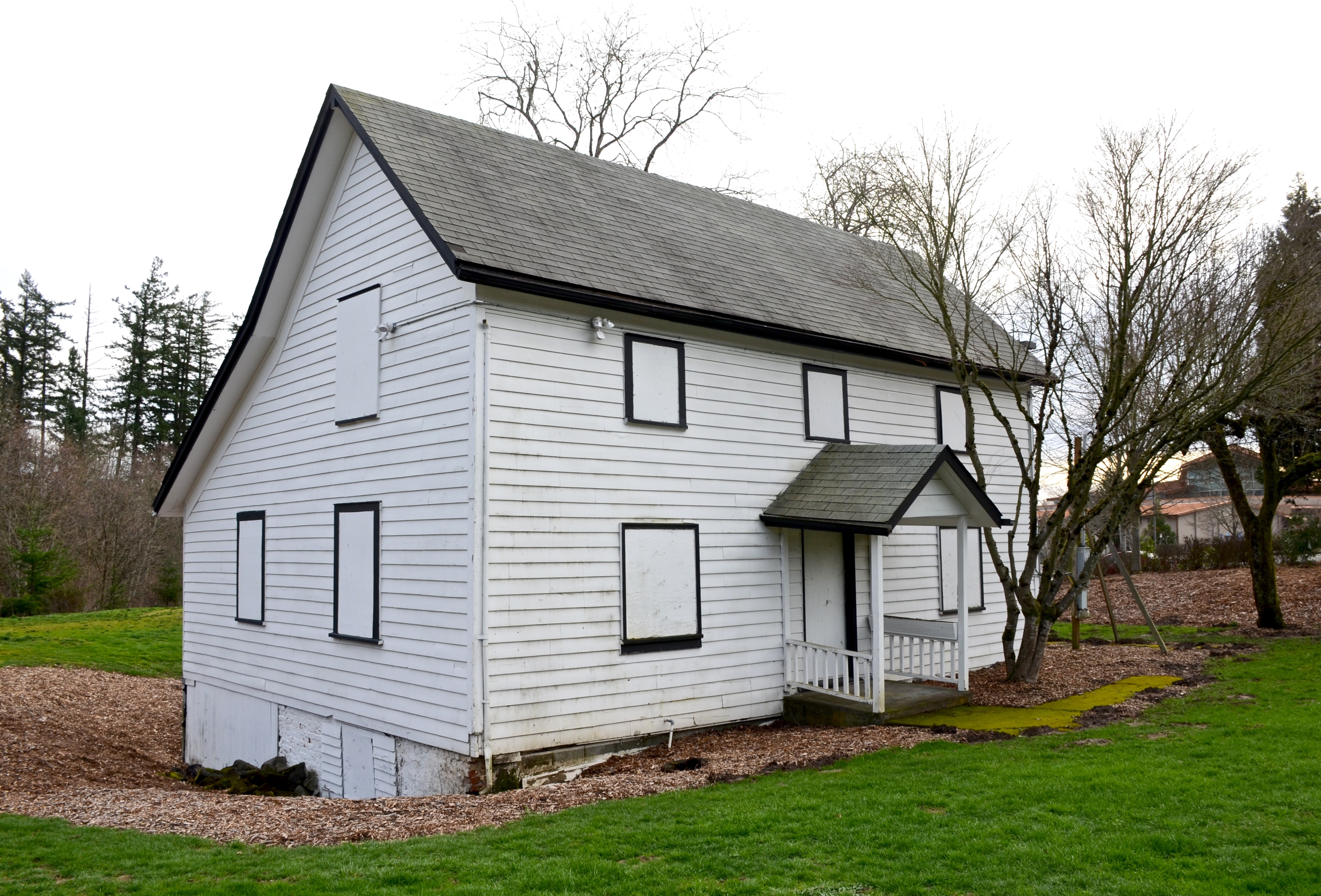
- The house in 2016, awaiting restoration

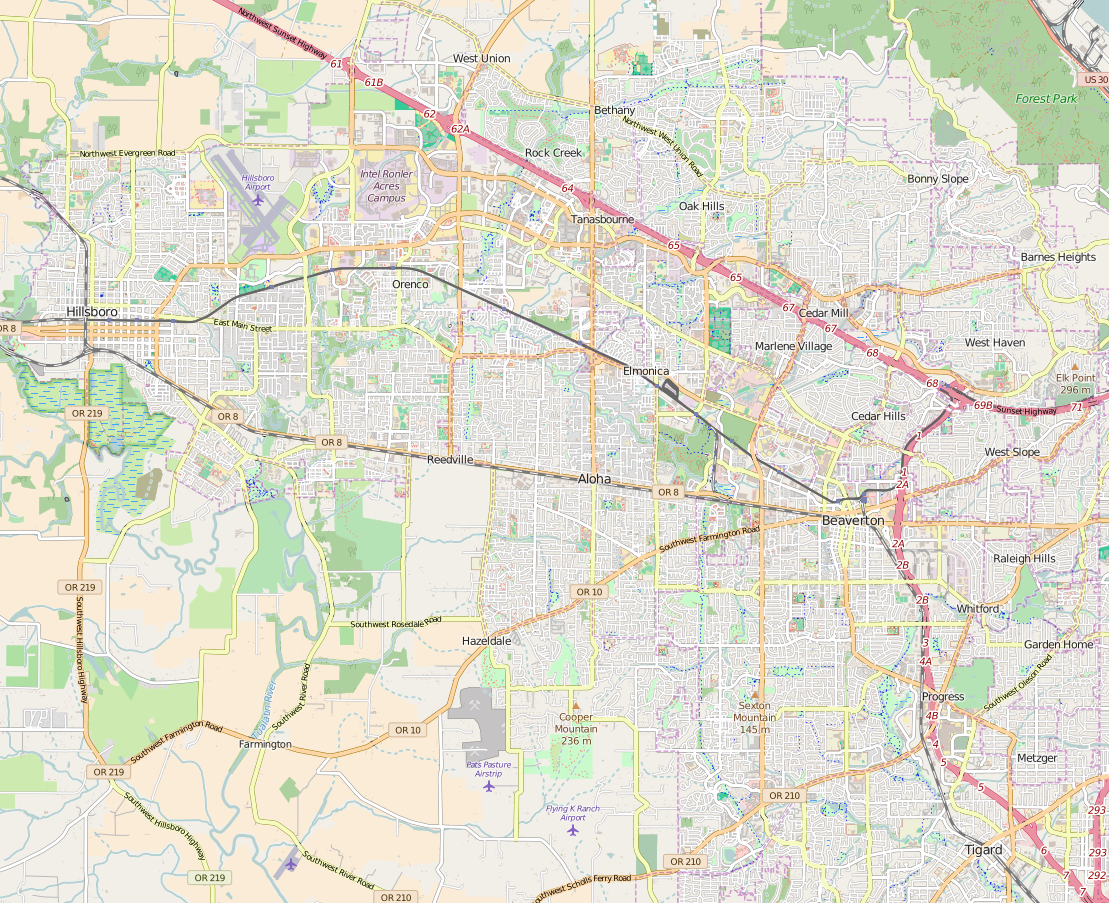
- Location within Hillsboro Beaverton OR Location within Oregon Location within the United States
- Location: 12050 NW Cornell Rd. Cedar Mill, Oregon
- Coordinates: 45°31′36.3″N 122°48′2.2″W
- Built: 1869
- Architectural style: Saltbox; 2 story, 3 bay with lean-to
- NRHP reference No.: 08001264
- Added to NRHP: December 31, 2008

The John Quincy Adams and Elizabeth Young House, also known as the John Quincy Adams Young House, is a historic American saltbox house built in 1869 in the U.S. state of Oregon. It is located in the unincorporated Cedar Mill area of Washington County, Oregon, near Portland, and is listed on the National Register of Historic Places.

== History ==
John Quincy Adams Young and his wife Elizabeth Young settled in the area in 1862 and built a log cabin. In 1869, they built a new home, followed by another larger one built in 1873. Young served as the first postmaster of Cedar Mill starting in 1874. He named the community after the cedar trees in the area and for the mill he co-owned. The post office was located in the 1869 house, with the family living across the road in a newer home. Young remained as postmaster until 1882.

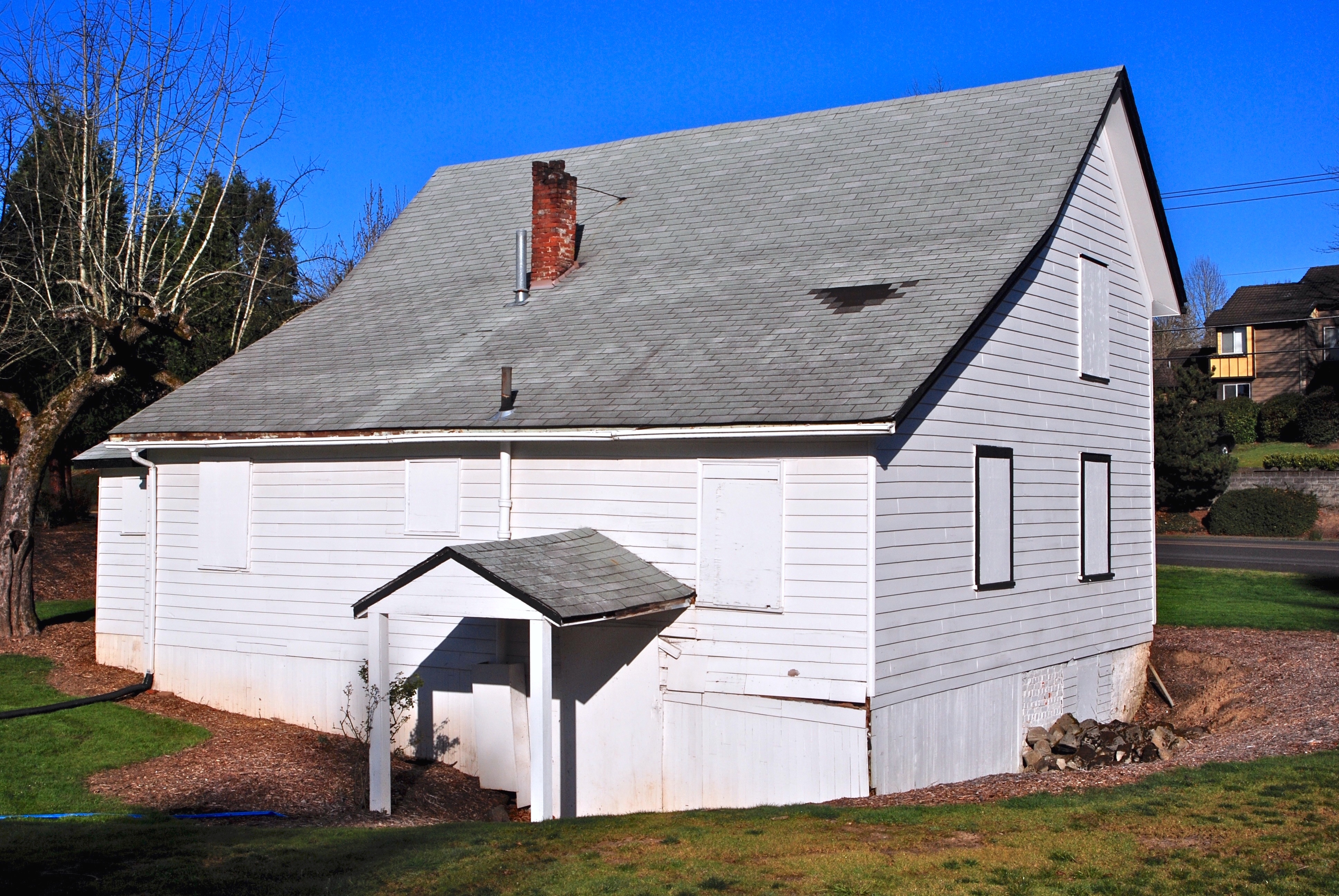
View of rear in 2015

The house and a half acre of land surrounding it have been owned by the Tualatin Hills Park and Recreation District (THPRD) since 2005. It was listed on the National Register of Historic Places in 2008. In 2012, the Friends of the John Quincy Adams Young House asked THPRD to allocate $26,000 to repair the foundation of the structure. The group was also attempting to raise $650,000 to completely restore the home and allow it to be opened up to the public.

== See also ==
- National Register of Historic Places listings in Washington County, Oregon
