= Cedar Mill Park =

Park in Washington County, Oregon, U.S.

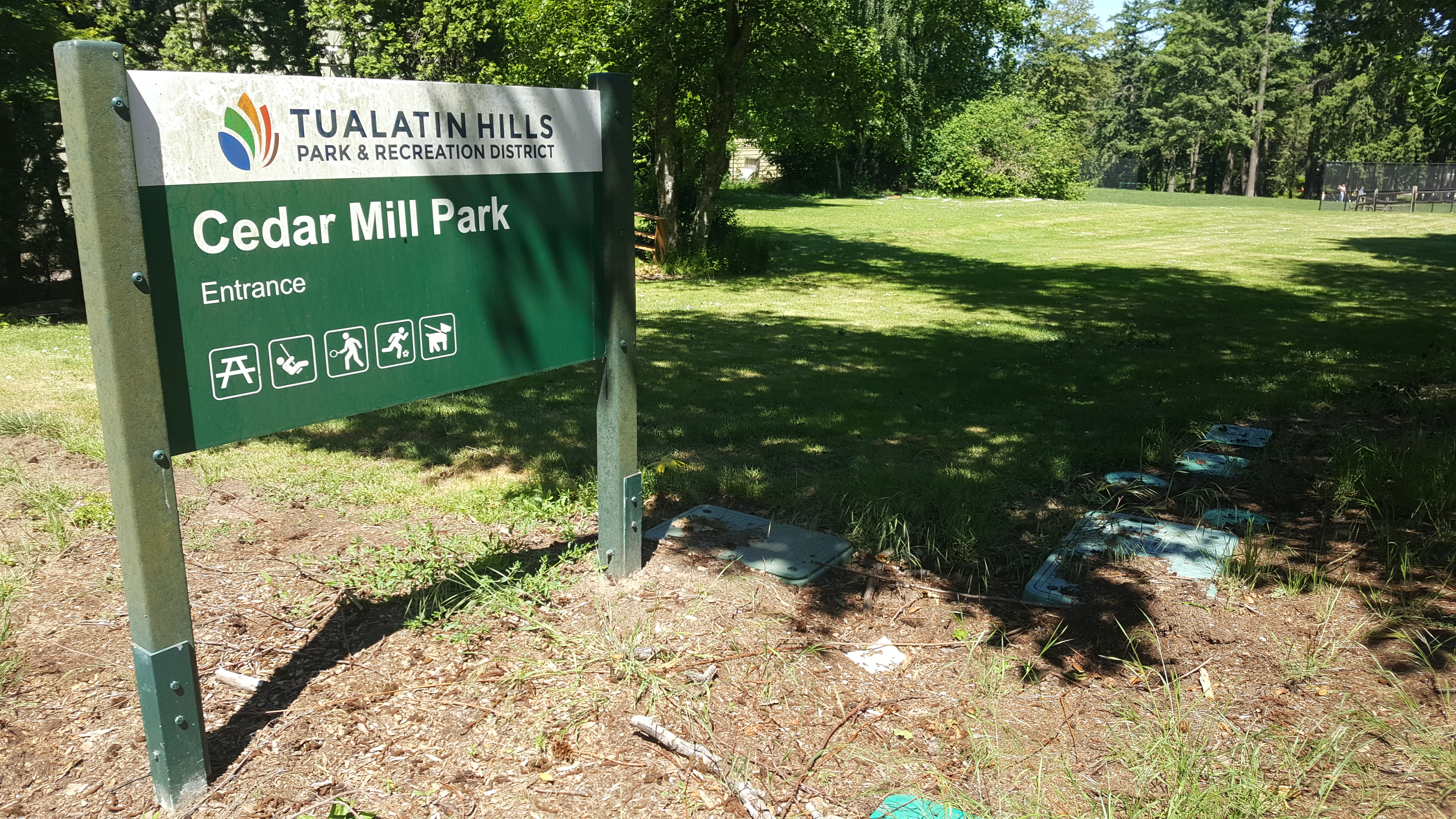
- Sign showing the entrance to the park
- Interactive map of Cedar Mill Park
- Coordinates: 45°31′39″N 122°47′5″W

Cedar Mill Park is a 5-acre (2.0 ha) park in the Cedar Mill neighborhood, in the Portland, Oregon metropolitan area.

The park was closed for improvements in June 2014, re-opening in November.
