= Howard M. Terpenning Recreation Complex =

Public recreation center in Beaverton, Oregon

Coordinates: 45.52010°N 122.83630°W

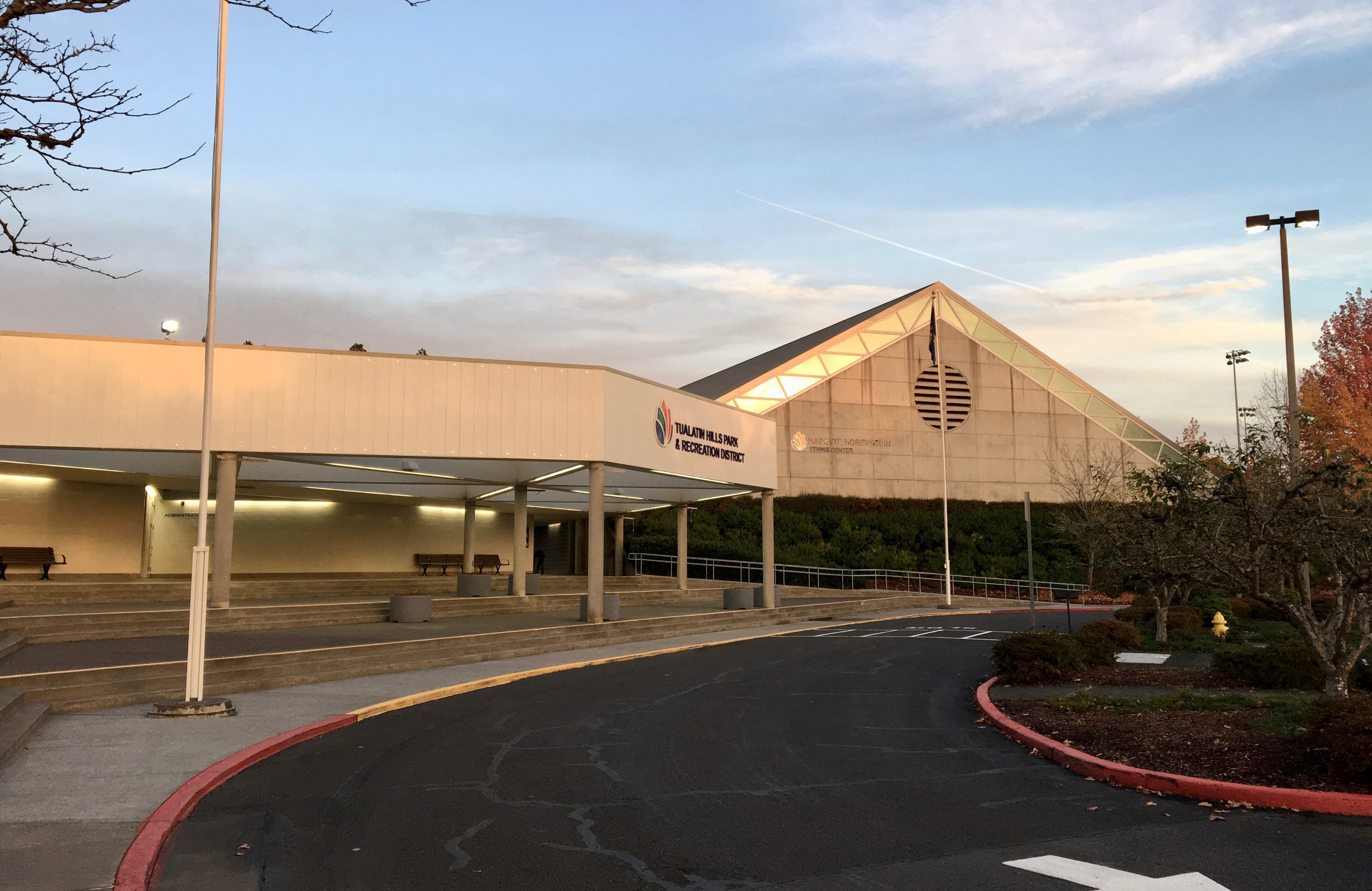
- Entrance
- Interactive map of Howard M. Terpenning Recreation Complex
- Type: Public
- Location: Beaverton, Washington County, Oregon, United States
- Area: 92 acres (37 hectares)
- Created: 1978
- Operator: Tualatin Hills Park & Recreation District
- Status: Open
- Website: Website

The Howard M. Terpenning Recreation Complex, often called the Terpenning Recreation Complex or simply the THPRD recreation complex, is a 92-acre recreation complex in Beaverton, Oregon. It is owned and operated by the Tualatin Hills Park and Recreation District (THPRD) and serves as the location of the district's administrative offices. The complex, in addition to the administrative offices, houses an indoor Olympic swimming pool, a tennis center, an athletic center, and several sports fields, as well as a natural area. Approximately 650,000 people visit the complex every year.

== History ==
First opened in 1978, the complex was renamed in 1993 for Howard M. Terpenning (1931–2014), THPRD's General Manager from 1959 until December 31, 1992. Terpenning died on February 8, 2014, at the age of 83.

Each year the complex hosts THPRD's annual three-part festival which includes the Party in the Park, Beaverton Cultural Festival, and Family Triathlon, usually held toward the end of July.

== Facilities ==
The complex houses an indoor pool, indoor athletic center, indoor and outdoor tennis courts, five multipurpose sport fields, seven baseball/softball fields, two skate parks, four outdoor basketball courts, two playgrounds, and a natural area with walking/running trails. The first skate park opened in 1998, and in 2008 a second one, designed for beginners, was added.

The aquatic center is an indoor 50-meter swimming pool. Between July and November 2014 the north entrance to the pool was closed for construction and remodeling, however the south entrance and therefore the pool remained open. The Aquatic Center also hosts a variety of aquatic clubs, including the Tualatin Hills Synchronized Swimming Club.

The athletic center features six indoor basketball courts, an indoor running track, and several drop-in sports such as volleyball, badminton, and table tennis. The center often hosts events such as the Portland Trail Blazers' annual Summer Hoops Camp.

The tennis center features 15 tennis courts: six indoor courts, eight outdoor courts (which are covered during the winter for year-round use) and a stadium court, only used for events. 2016 Davis Cup matches between the United States and Croatia were held at the tennis center between July 15 and 17, 2016. Originally known as the Tualatin Hills Tennis Center, the name was changed in August 2016 to honor former THPRD board member Babette Horenstein.

== Gallery ==
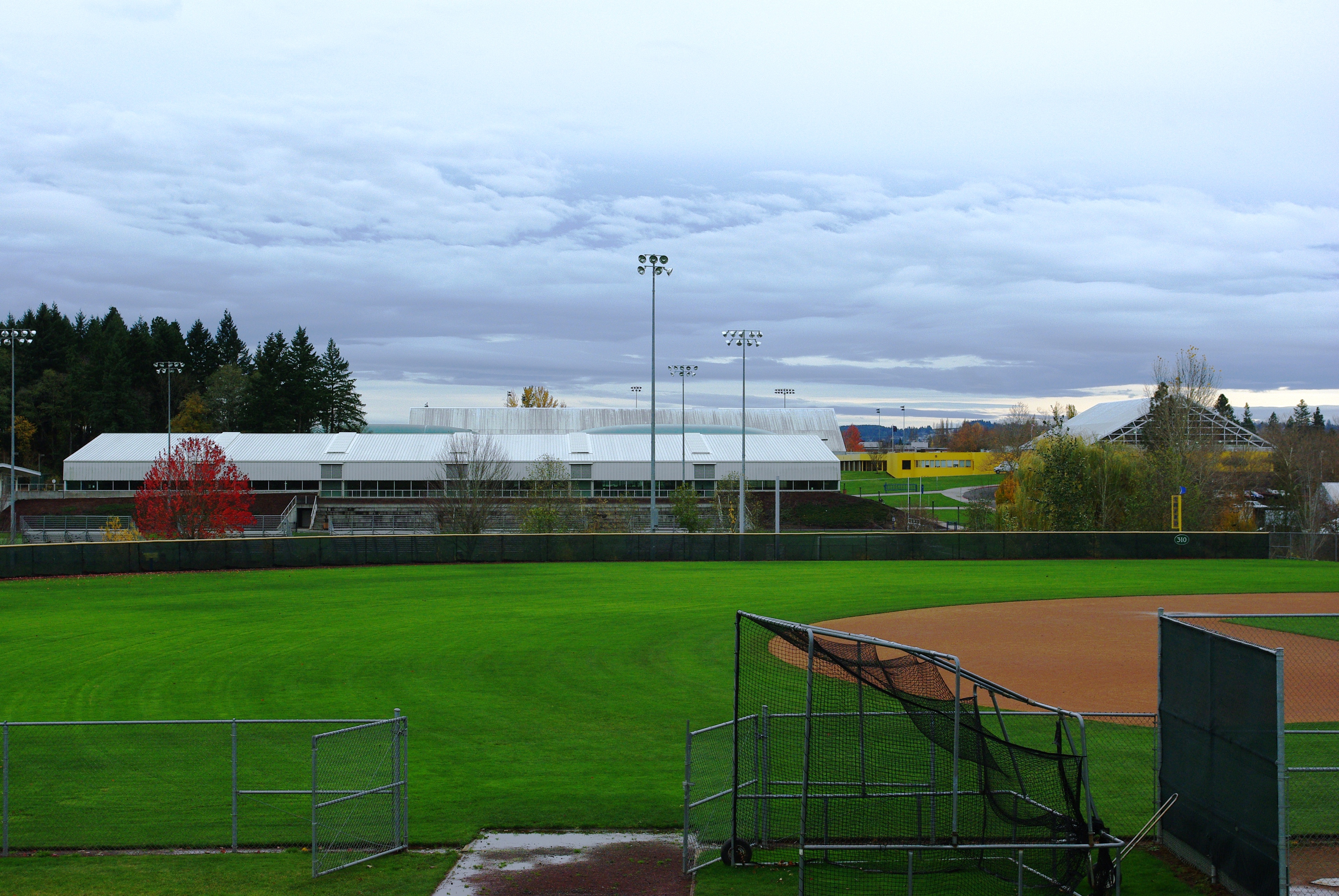
Howard M. Terpenning Recreation Complex

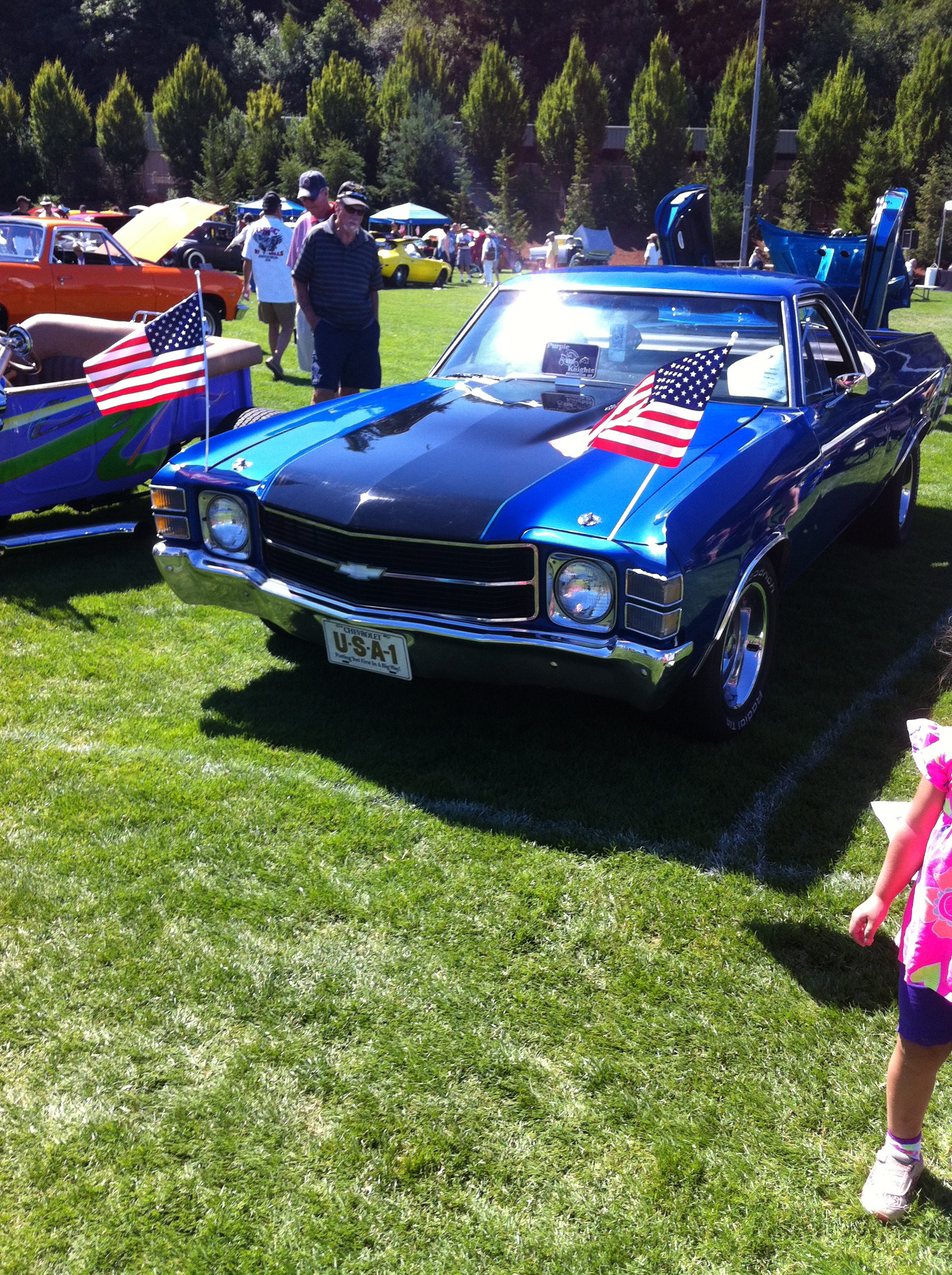
Car show at the annual Party in the Park

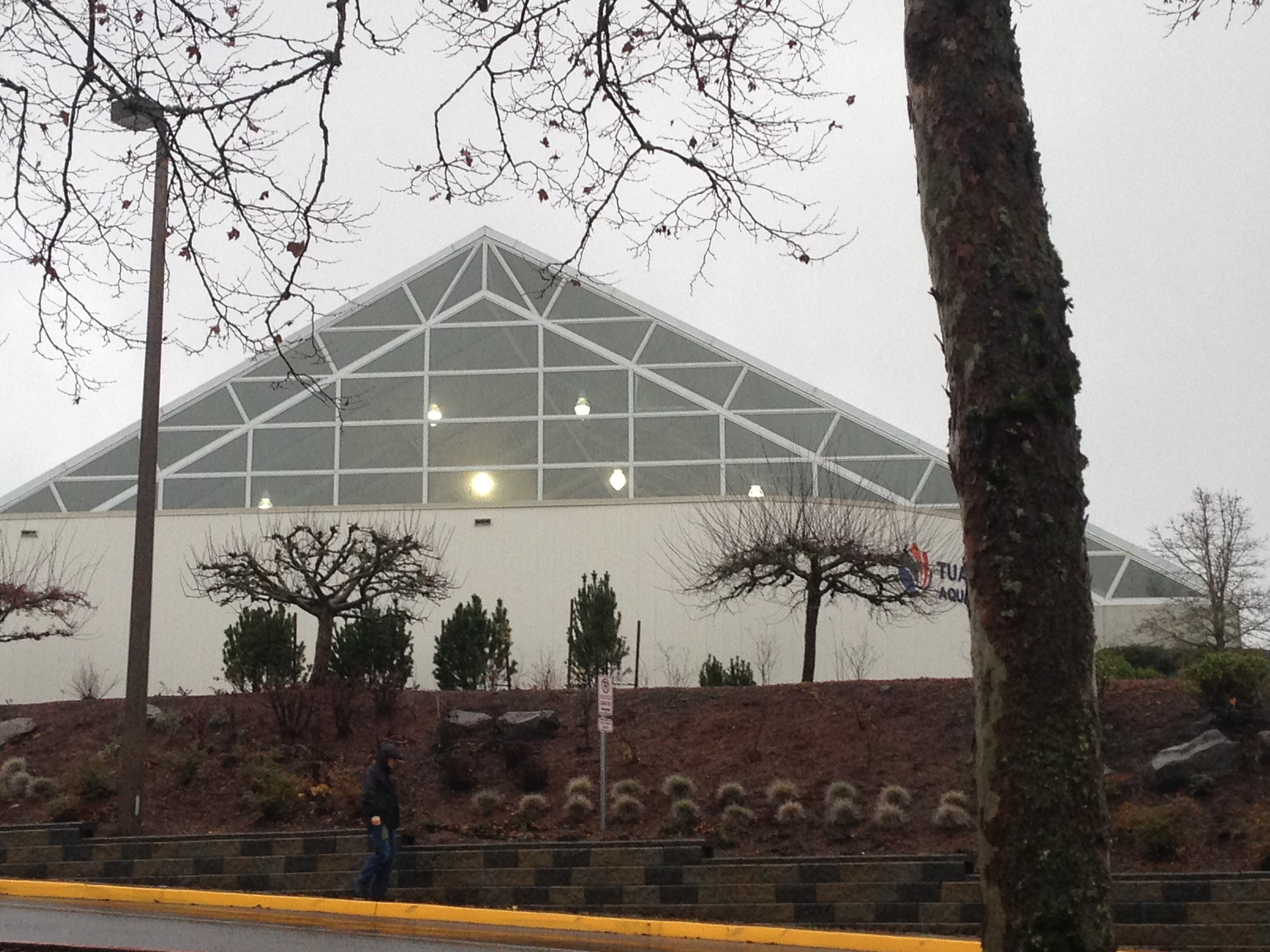
Aquatic center

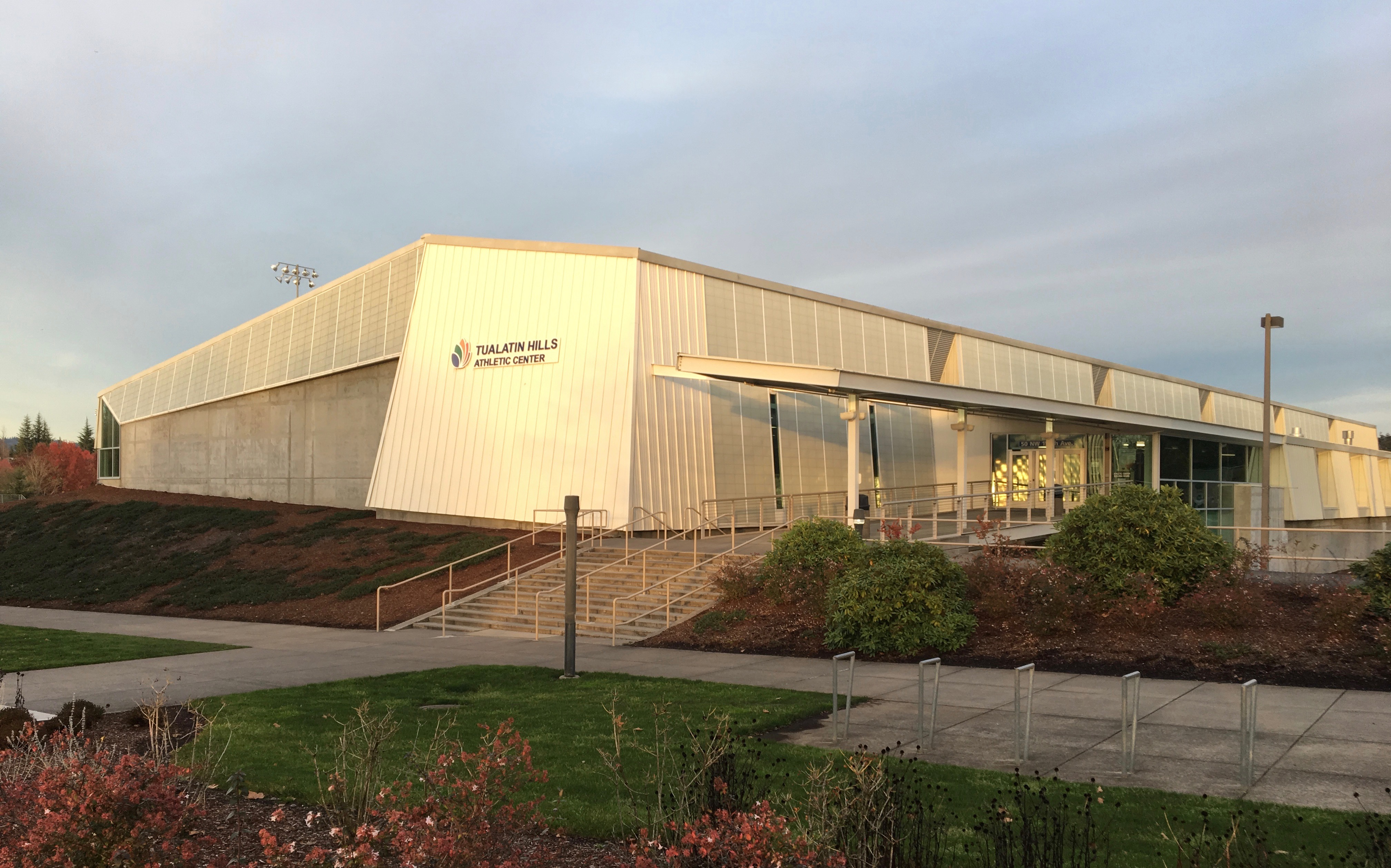
Athletic center

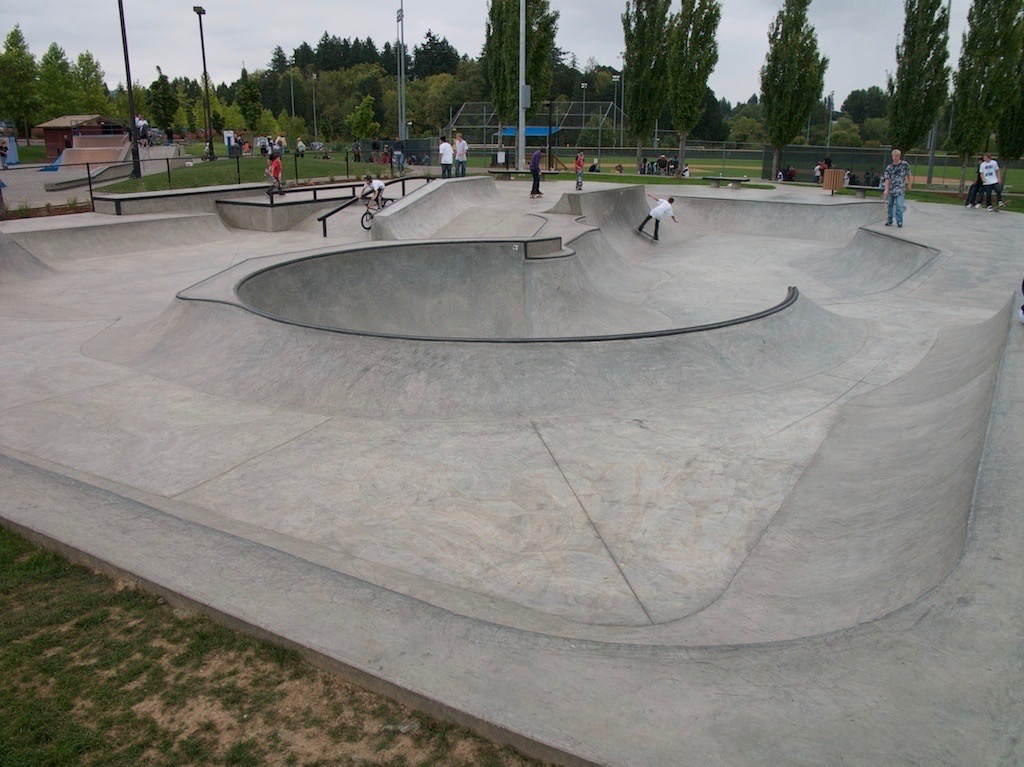
Skate park

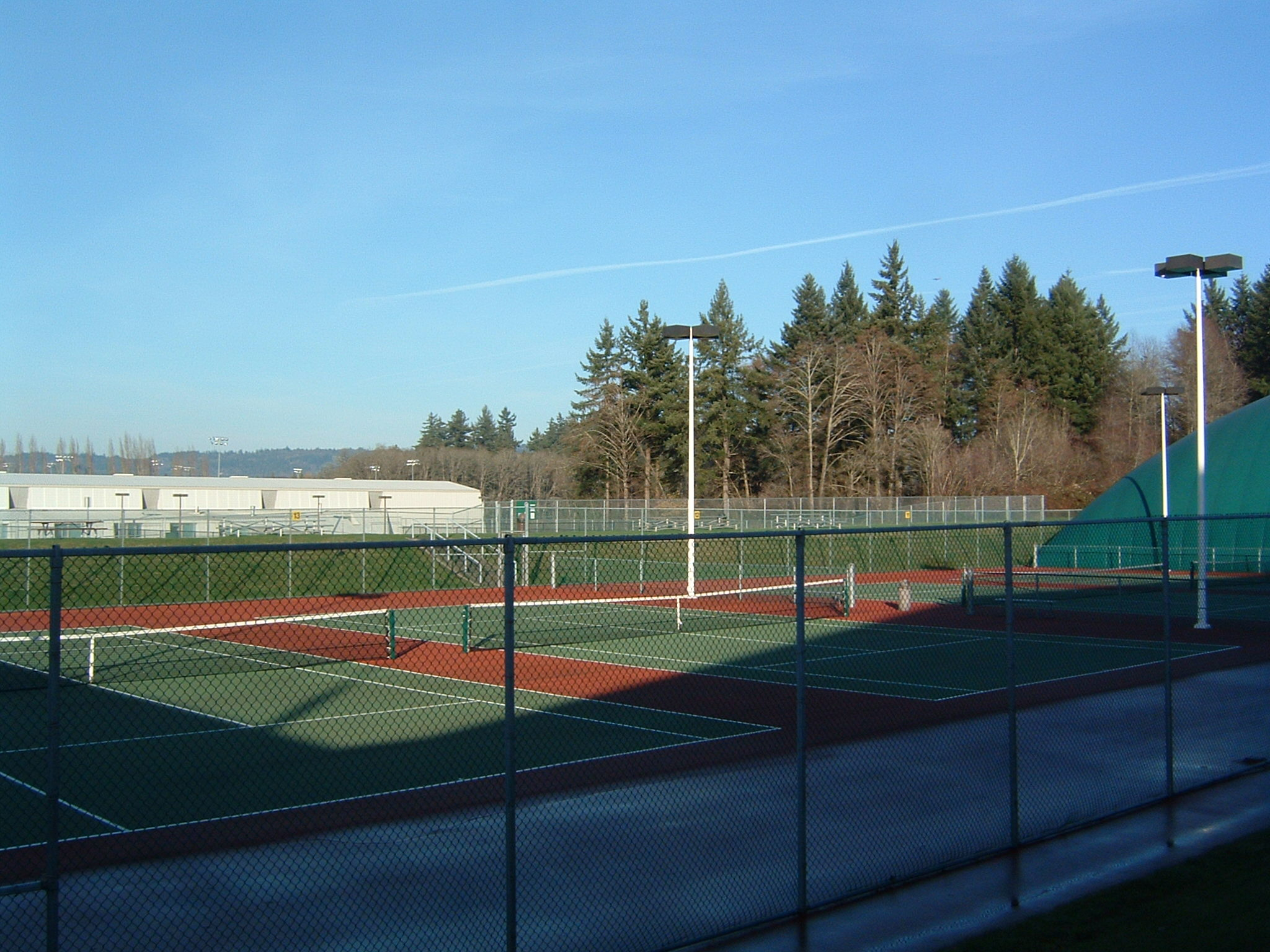
Tennis courts

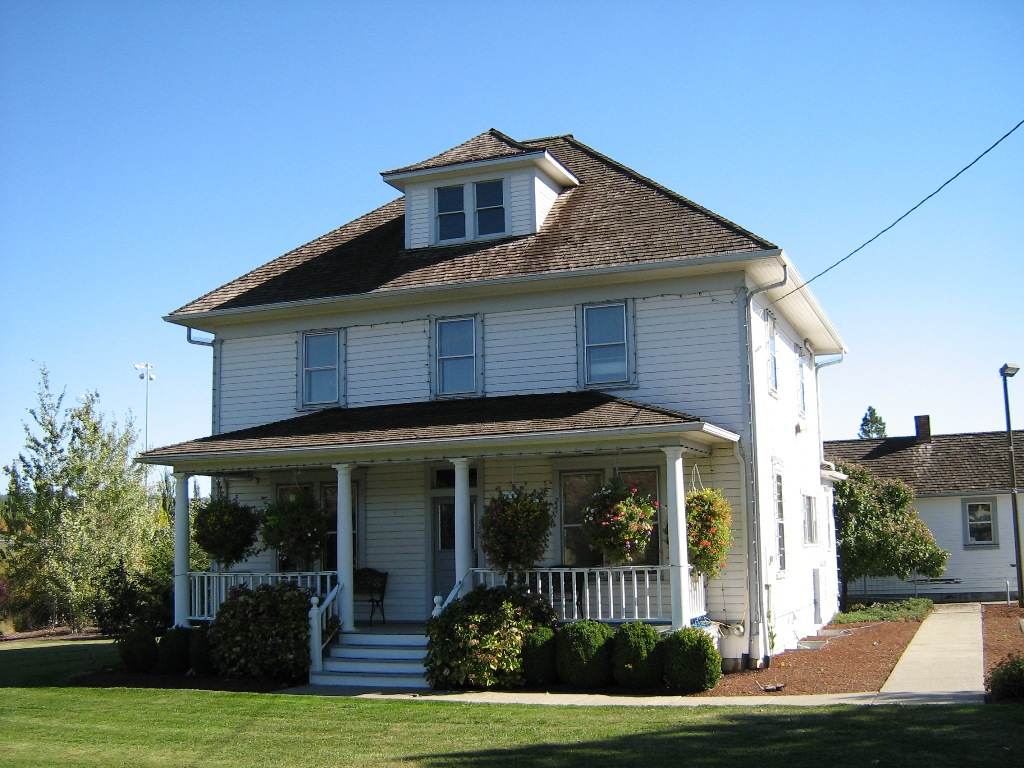
The historic Schlottmann House, now used as THPRD offices

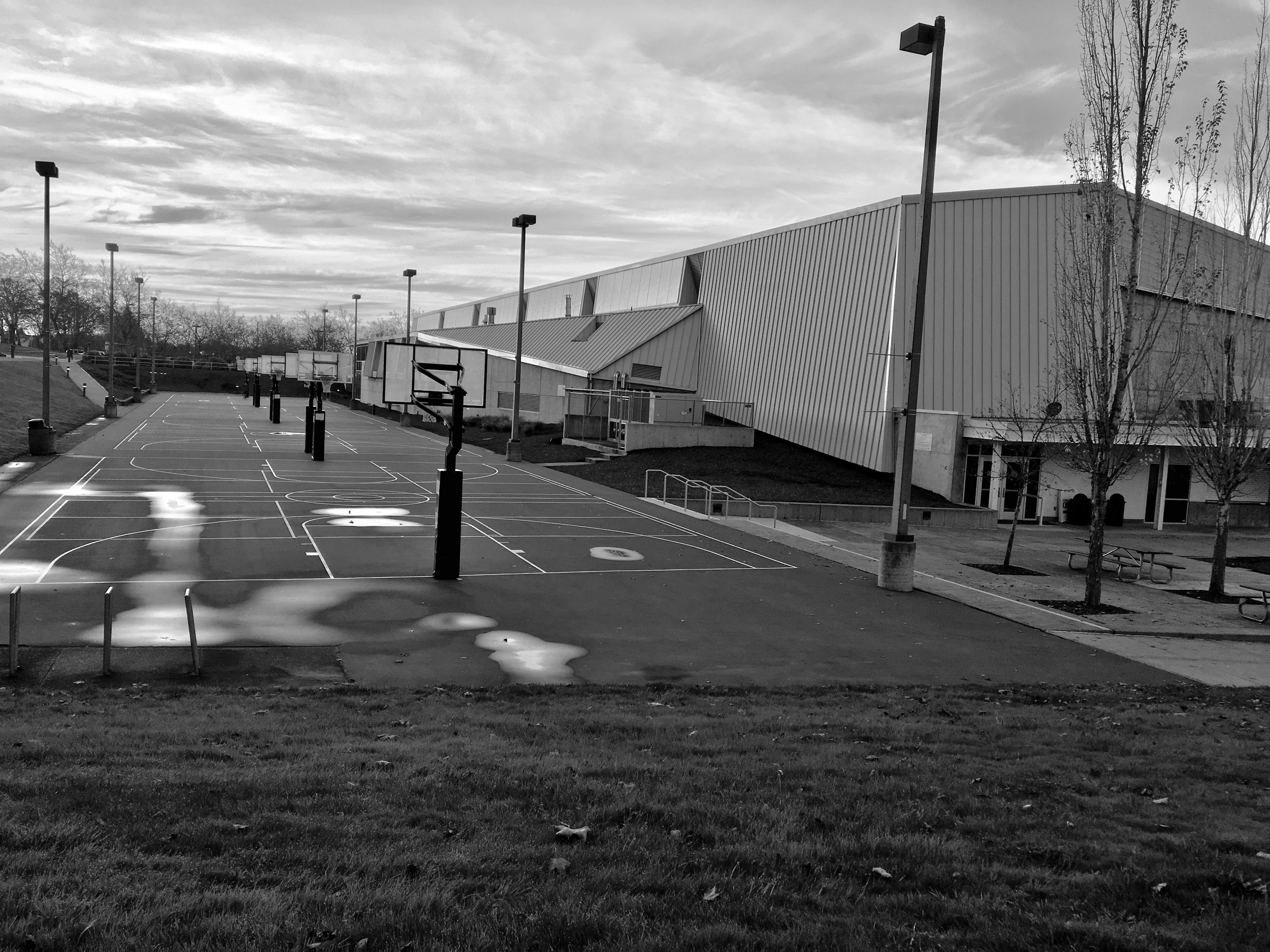
Basketball court adjacent to athletic center
