= Cascades Raptor Center =

Nature center and wildlife hospital in Oregon, United States

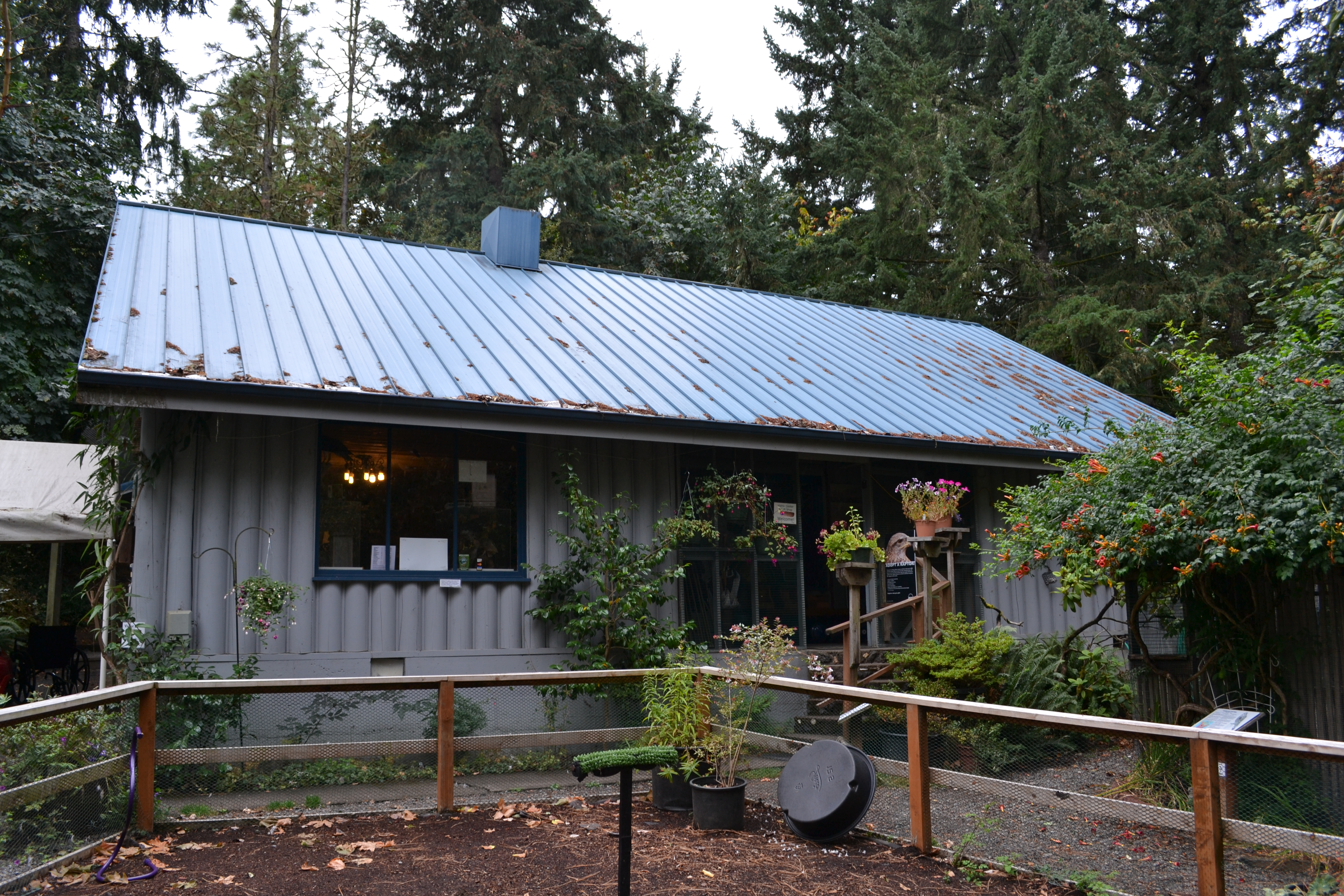
- Interactive map of Cascades Raptor Center
- 43.987438°N 123.079764°W
- Date opened: 1987
- Location: Eugene, Oregon, United States
- No. of animals: 37
- No. of species: 21
- Annual visitors: 25,000
- Website: cascadesraptorcenter.org

Location in Eugene, Oregon

The Cascades Raptor Center is a nature center and wildlife hospital in Eugene, Oregon that specializes in raptor rehabilitation. As of March 2025, permanent inhabitants of the center include 30 individual birds from 21 species.

== History ==
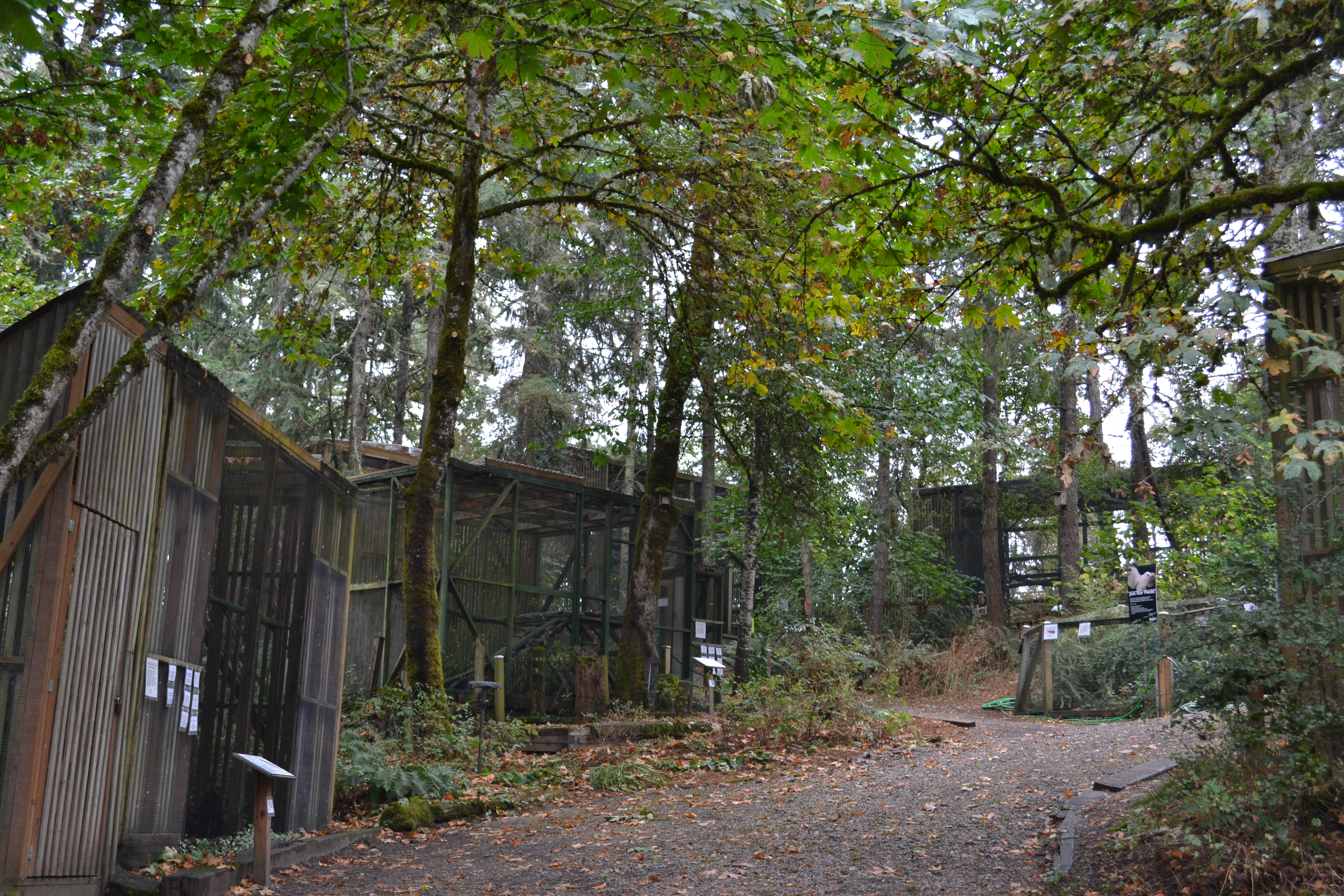
Habitat Area

The Cascades Raptor Center was founded in 1987 as a 501c3 non-profit nature center and wildlife hospital, initially taking birds to schools and public events, but not allowing visitors. In early 1994 the center was moved to its current location, and it is now open to the public. The center specializes in rescuing, rehabilitating, and releasing sick, injured and orphaned birds back to the wild when possible, and providing a long term habitat for some that cannot be released into the wild because of their injuries or imprinting on humans.

== Animals ==
The center is permanent home to about 30 individual birds representing 21 native species of raptors. In 2014, nearly 300 injured birds were treated at the center. Species at the center represent most of the raptor species found in Oregon and include barn owl, barred owl, great horned owl, western screech owl, turkey vulture, bald eagle, golden eagle, ferruginous hawk, northern goshawk, northern harrier, red-tailed hawk, Swainson's hawk, American kestrel, merlin, gyrfalcon, and peregrine falcon, as well as the nonnative Eurasian eagle-owl and Saker falcon.

== Education ==
The center provides guided educational programs of various lengths for large or small groups ("take a Walk on the Wild Side", "Reading with Raptors", and staff guided private tours) and self-guided tours at the facility, and visits by staff and birds to classrooms and other venues for presentations of various lengths ("Bring the Wild Alive" and "Reading with Raptors"). All guided programs can be tailored to the needs of the group.
