= Cooper Mountain Nature Park =

Public park in Portland, Oregon, United States

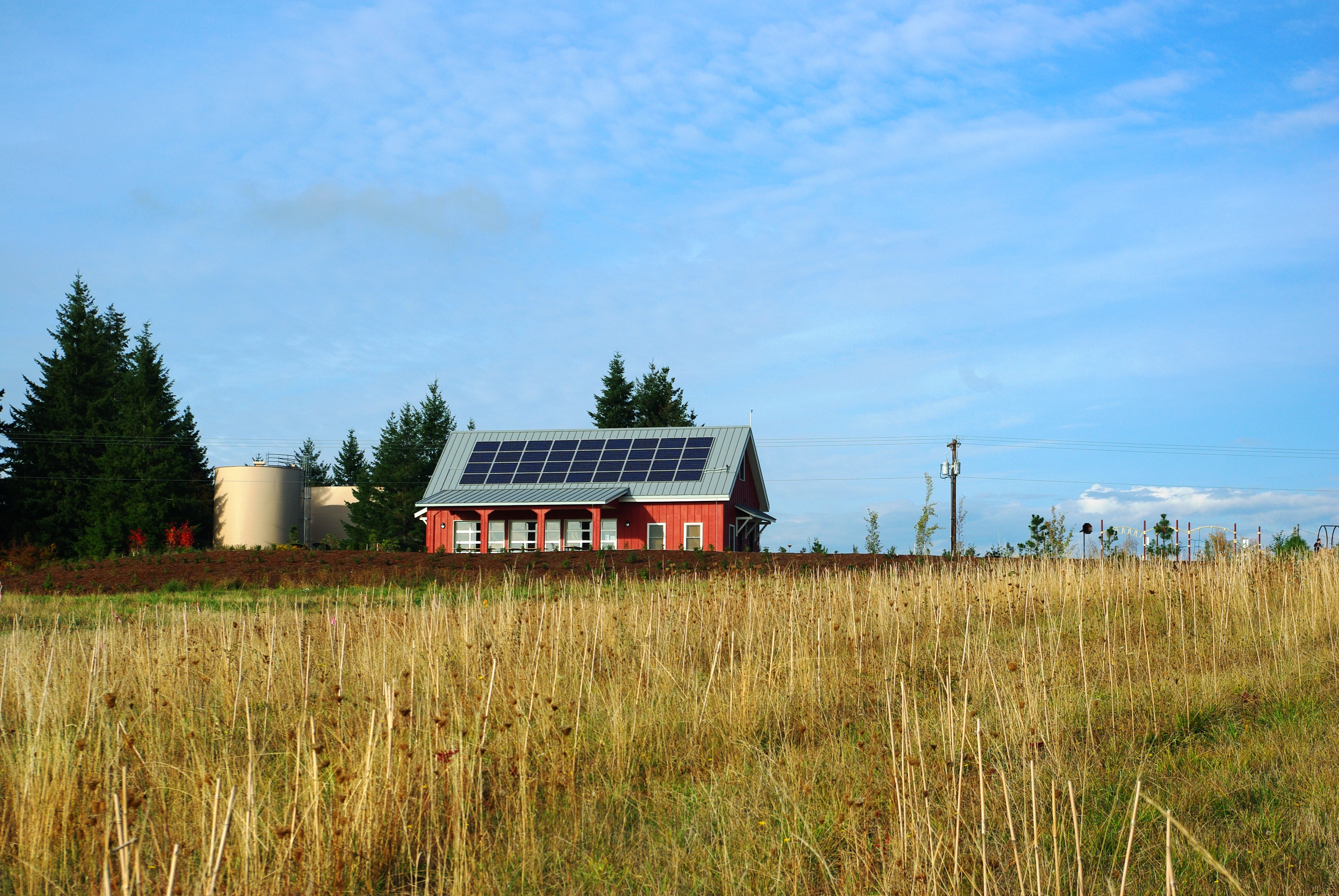
- Prairie at the park with the Nature House in the background
- Interactive map of Cooper Mountain Nature Park
- Type: Public
- Location: Near Beaverton, Oregon; United States
- Coordinates: 45°26′52″N 122°52′24″W
- Area: 231 acres (93 hectares)
- Created: 2009
- Operator: Tualatin Hills Park & Recreation District
- Status: Open
- Website: Cooper Mountain Nature Park

Cooper Mountain Nature Park is a 231 acres (93 ha) nature park in the Portland metropolitan area in the U.S. state of Oregon. Opened in 2009, the park is owned and operated by Metro, the regional government in the Oregon portion of the metro area. The park is named after Cooper Mountain, the primary geological feature in the area near Beaverton. Maintained by the regional Tualatin Hills Park and Recreation District, the natural area has 3.5 miles (5.6 km) of hiking trails. It is one of THPRD's two nature parks, along with the Tualatin Hills Nature Park.

== History ==
Portland area voters approved a bond measure in 1995 that provided funding for the purchase of greenspaces by Metro. Metro covers most of Washington, Clackamas, and Multnomah counties in the northwest part of Oregon. Metro began buying land on Cooper Mountain near Aloha and Beaverton in 1997, and spent $6.58 million in total on land. Voters approved an additional bond in 2006, and Metro spent almost $2 million from that bond on facilities at Cooper Mountain. Metro also received a $500,000 grant from the Oregon Department of Parks and Recreation and a $40,000 grant from the National Fish and Wildlife Foundation for development of the park. To prepare the area for the park and help restore the native habitat, the area was burned in 2008. Cooper Mountain Nature Park opened on June 27, 2009. Through 2009, volunteers and Metro planted approximately 100,000 shrubs and trees at the park.

== Features ==
Cooper Mountain Nature Park is located on the south side of the 774-foot (236 m) tall Cooper Mountain in eastern Washington County. The mountain, contrary to popular belief, is not a former volcano, but was formed due to basalt flows in the Tualatin Valley. The park's natural areas include groves of oak trees, wetlands, prairie, ponds, and forested areas. Metro owns the park, but will pay Tualatin Hills Parks and Recreation about $600,000 to maintain the park over a ten-year contract. The 231 acres (93 ha) natural area is surrounded by agricultural lands to the south and urban development on the north. Cooper Mountain is between Oregon Route 10 and Oregon Route 210 south of Beaverton.

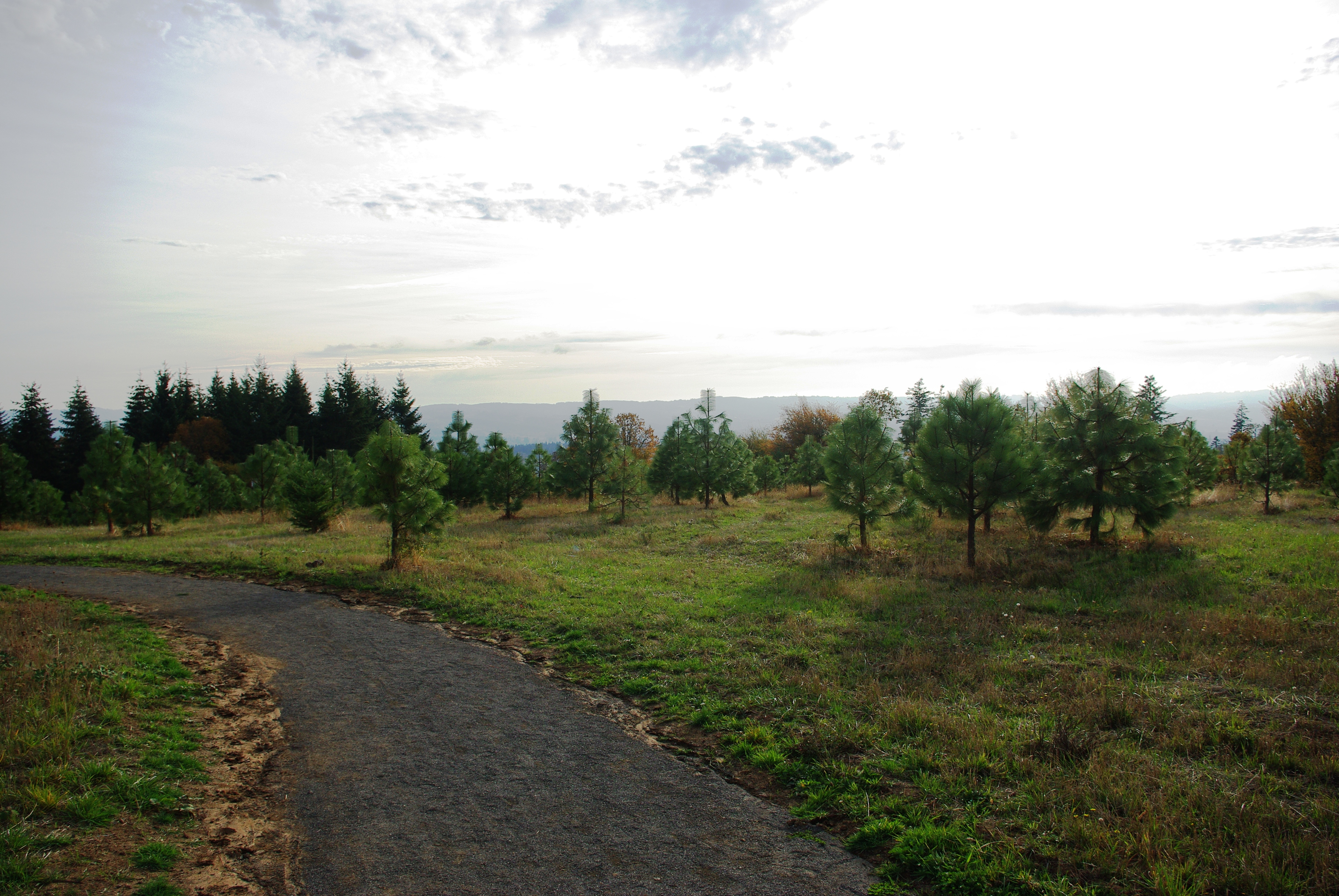
Trail and young trees at the park looking south

Amenities at the park include gardens, a nature center building, parking, bike racks, a children's playground, and 3.5 miles (5.6 km) of gravel trails. The nature center, called the Nature House, is used for educational programs and includes rest rooms, plus it is partly powered by solar panels. Birds at the park include the red-tailed hawk, great horned owl, bald eagle, western bluebird, several sparrow species, and the olive-sided flycatcher. Other animal species in the park include the northern red-legged frog, western gray squirrel, northern alligator lizard, and the rubber boa. Plant life includes Oregon sunshine, meadow checkermallow, western columbine, and the endangered pale larkspur.

== See also ==
- Blue Lake Regional Park
- Oxbow Regional Park
