= Rockcreek, Oregon =

Unincorporated community in the state of Oregon, United States

- Census-designated place (CDP)
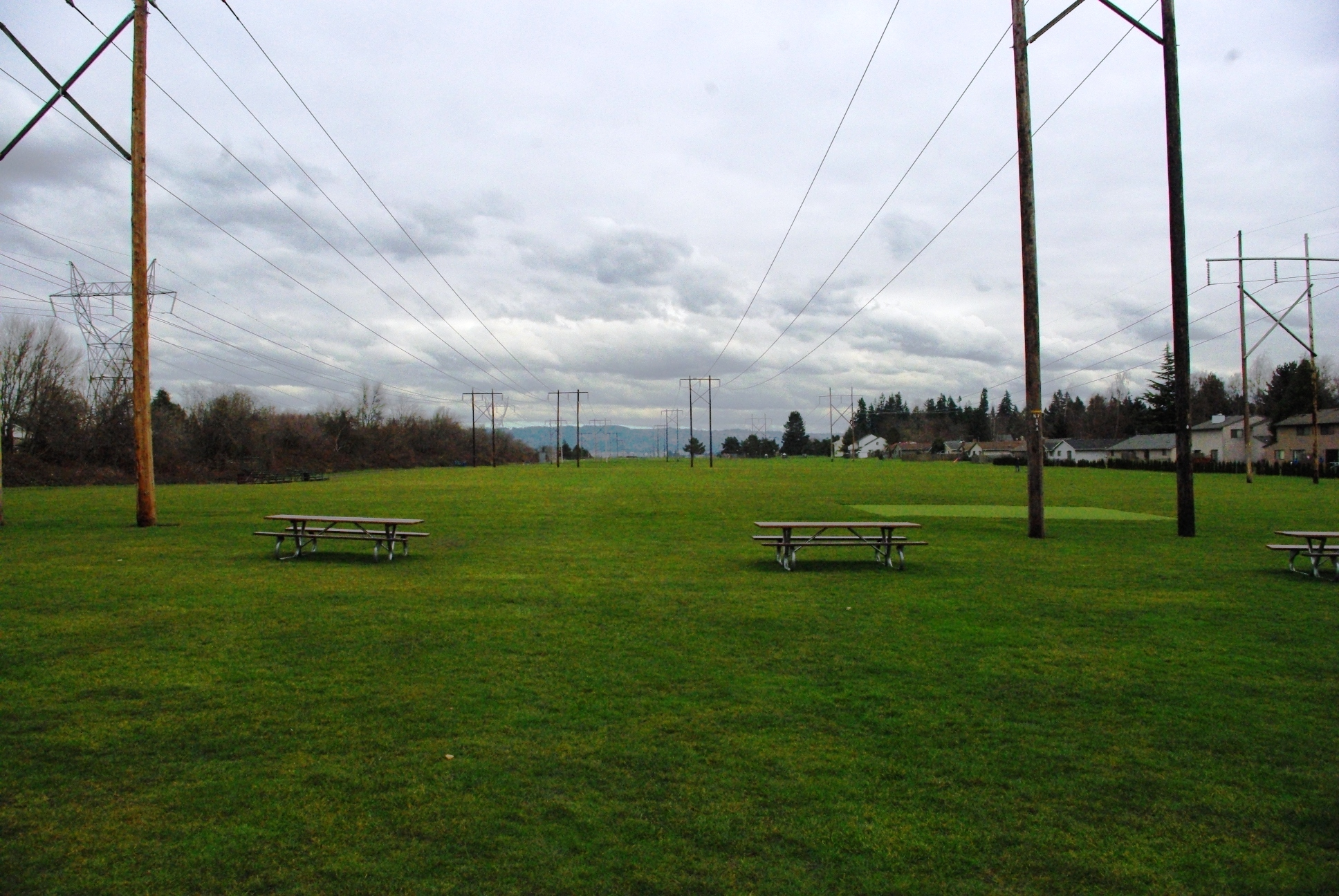
- Rock Creek Powerline Park

- Location of Rockcreek, Oregon
- Coordinates: 45°33′04″N 122°52′30″W
- Country: United States
- State: Oregon
- County: Washington

Area
  - Total: 1.97 sq mi (5.09 km^{2})
  - Land: 1.97 sq mi (5.09 km^{2})
  - Water: 0 sq mi (0.00 km^{2})
- Elevation: 171 ft (52 m)

Population (2020)
  - Total: 9,862
  - Density: 5,015.0/sq mi (1,936.31/km^{2})
- Time zone: UTC-8 (Pacific (PST))
  - Summer (DST): UTC-7 (PDT)
- ZIP code: 97229
- Area codes: 503 and 971
- FIPS code: 41-63010
- GNIS feature ID: 2409195

Rockcreek is a census-designated place in Washington County, Oregon, United States, north of U.S. Route 26. It is named for the Rock Creek neighborhood in the area. As of the 2020 census, Rockcreek had a population of 9,862. Named for Rock Creek, a tributary of the Tualatin River, that flows north to south through the neighborhood.

== Geography ==
The community is bordered on the south and west by Hillsboro, with Cornelius Pass Road dividing the two on the west and the Sunset Highway as the dividing line on the south. According to the United States Census Bureau, the CDP has a total area of 2.0 square miles (5.2 km^{2}), all land.

== Government ==
An unincorporated community, Rockcreek does not have a municipal government. Government services are provided by a variety of regional districts.

Fire protection is provided by Tualatin Valley Fire & Rescue, Hillsboro Fire & Rescue, and Washington County Fire District 2. Law enforcement comes from the Washington County Sheriff. Rockcreek is within the Portland metropolitan area's regional government, Metro, while parks are provided by the Tualatin Hills Park & Recreation District.

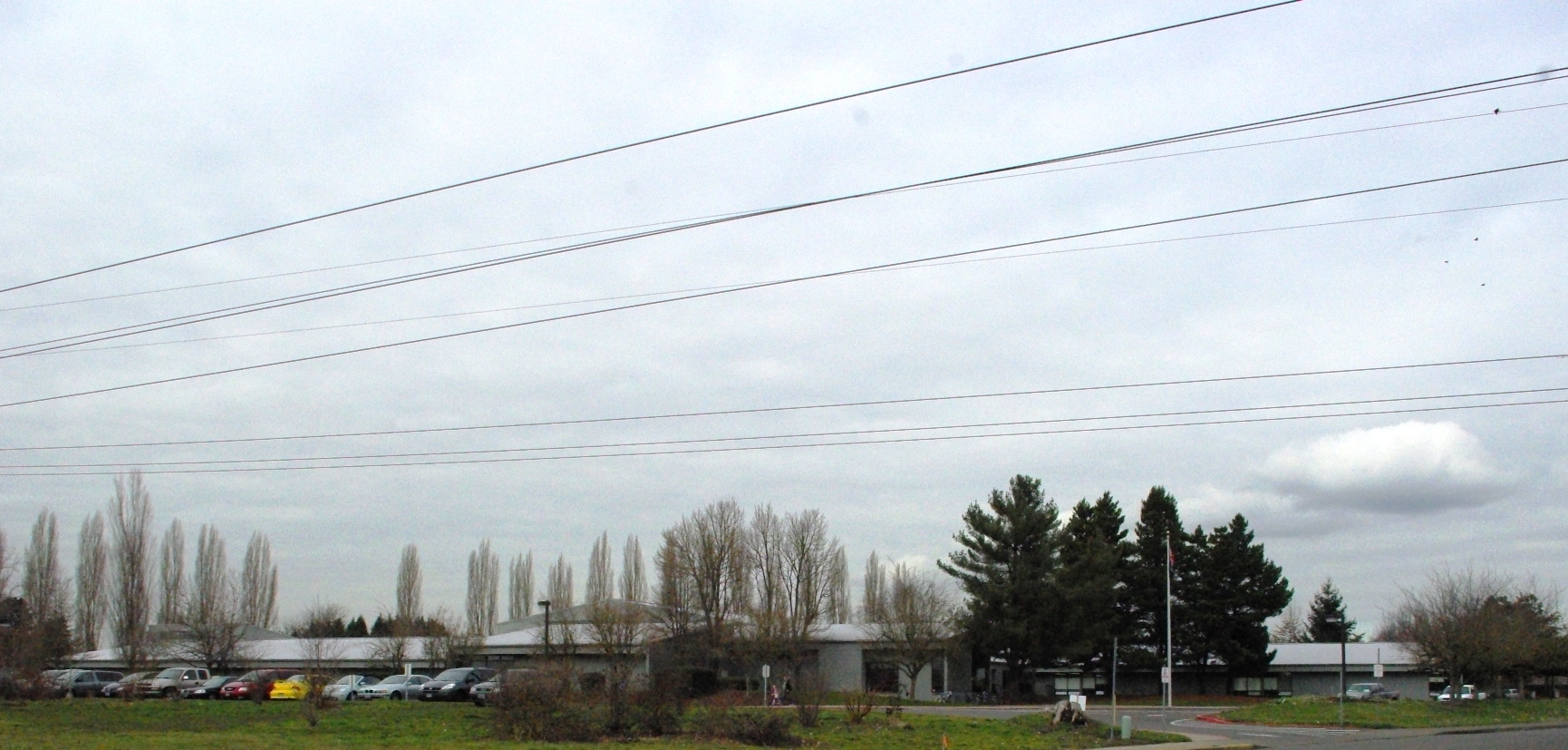
Lenox Elementary School

== Demographics ==
Historical population
| Census | Pop. | Note | %± |
|---|---|---|---|
| 2020 | 9,862 | | — |
U.S. Decennial Census

As of the census of 2010, there were 9,316 people, 3,674 households, and 2,584 families residing in the CDP. The population density was 4,689.8 inhabitants per square mile (1,810.7/km^{2}). There were 3,609 housing units at an average density of 1,799.8 per square mile (694.9/km^{2}). The racial makeup of the CDP was 72.7% European American, 1.4% African American, 0.3% Native American, 19.1% Asian American, 0.2% Pacific Islander, 2.10% from other races, and 4.10% from two or more races. Hispanic or Latino of any race were 5.8% of the population.

There were 3,501 households, out of which 39.6% had children under the age of 18 living with them, 62.3% were married couples living together, 7.8% had a female householder with no husband present, and 26.9% were non-families. 20.3% of all households were made up of individuals, and 3.4% had someone living alone who was 65 years of age or older. The average household size was 2.69 and the average family size was 3.15.

In the CDP, the population was spread out, with 28.6% under the age of 18, 7.5% from 18 to 24, 31.5% from 25 to 44, 25.6% from 45 to 64, and 6.7% who were 65 years of age or older. The median age was 35 years. For every 100 females, there were 102.5 males. For every 100 females age 18 and over, there were 100.9 males.

The median income for a household in the CDP was $63,958, and the median income for a family was $71,377. Males had a median income of $51,257 versus $34,591 for females. The per capita income for the CDP was $30,102. About 4.2% of families and 6.5% of the population were below the poverty line, including 9.3% of those under age 18 and 2.0% of those age 65 or over.

== Education ==
Most of Rockcreek is in the Beaverton School District while a portion is in the Hillsboro School District.

Construction began on Liberty High School in 2001.
