= Tualatin Hills Park & Recreation District =

Special parks district in Oregon, United States

Agency overview
- Formed: 1955
- Jurisdiction: Oregon
- Headquarters: Beaverton, Oregon; 45°31′7″N 122°50′16″W
- Employees: 212
- Annual budget: $40 million
- Agency executive: Doug Menke, general manager
- Website: www.tualatinhillsparks.org

Tualatin Hills Park & Recreation District (THPRD) is a special parks district located in the eastern part of Washington County in the U.S. state of Oregon. Created in 1955, the district covers all of the city of Beaverton and many of those communities surrounding Beaverton in the Portland metropolitan area. The district covers an area of 50 square miles (130 km^{2}) and serves a population of about 270,000, making it the largest parks district in Oregon. Tualatin Hills operates over 200 facilities totaling 2,100 acres (850 ha), including eight swimming centers. The district has an annual budget of $40 million and is overseen by a five-person board of directors.

== History ==
Around 1953 some members of Parent-Teacher Associations (PTA) in Beaverton-area schools started campaigning to create a recreation district, as Beaverton had few parks at the time. This group organized a meeting of PTAs and other civic groups and then decided to create a formal group, the Tualatin Hills Park and Recreation Council. They drew up a constitution for the group, elected Elsie Stuhr as the president, and started holding board meetings in July 1953. At the first meeting they adopted the name for the proposed district.

This group then started collecting signatures on a petition in September 1953 in order to create a special parks district, and collected the planned 4,000 signatures by December 1953. They gathered additional signatures in order to compensate for any errors. A total of 4,400 signatures were collected and turned over in February 1954 to the county, which the county had required 27% of property owners to sign the petition.

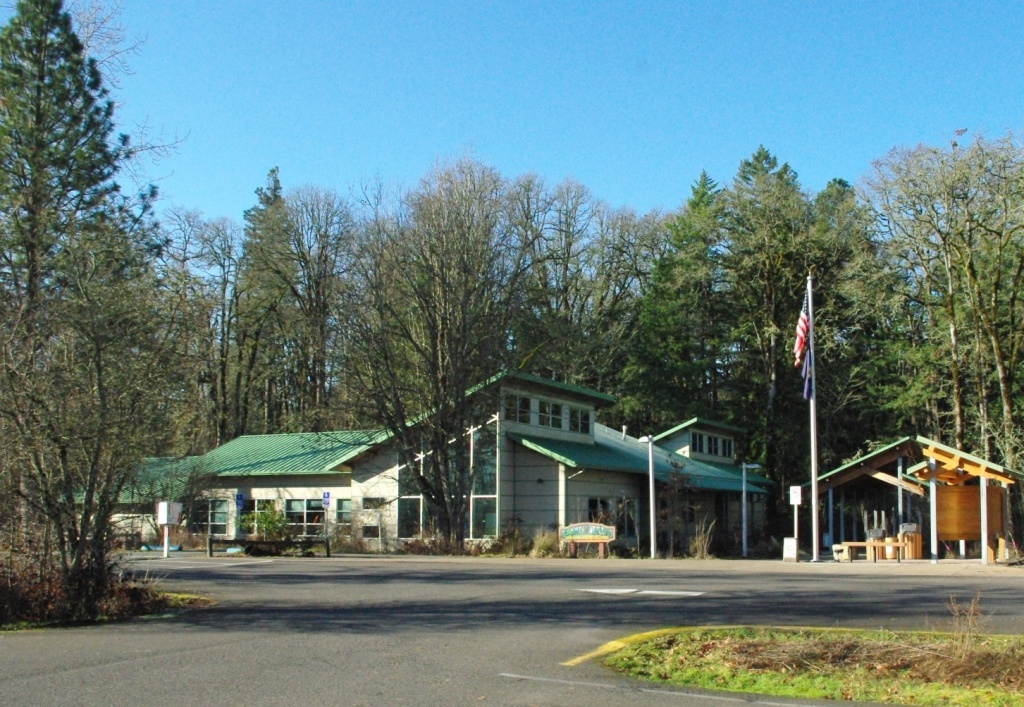
Interpretive center at the Tualatin Hills Nature Park

Then beginning in June 1954 the then county court, now board of commissioners, held meetings to work out what the boundaries would be for the proposed district. School districts in the area that withdrew fully or in part from the proposal included Aloha-Huber, McKinley, Groner, Sunset Valley, McKay, Bethany, and Cooper Mountain. The district would be entirely within the boundaries of the then Beaverton Union High School District, which later through consolidation became the Beaverton School District.

Opposition came mainly from farmers within the district who objected to increased taxes. The main arguments in support of the district were that increased recreation activities would decrease juvenile delinquency and that facilities within the area would reduce travel costs. The district planned to construct a centrally located swimming pool as the first priority if the district was created. In March 1955, the proposal was submitted to voters in the planned district, and the formation of the district was approved by a vote of 1,054 to 852, on March 4. At that time the district included all of Garden Home, Beaverton, Bonny Slope, Raleigh Hills, and the Washington County portion of Sylvan. Parts of Cooper Mountain, Hazeldale, Sunset Valley, Cedar Mill, and McKay also were in the new district.

The district became the third parks district in Oregon, with two in Lane County already in existence. Stuhr was elected as one of the three original directors, and was then elected as president at the board's first meeting. She and the other two original directors of the district had been members of the Tualatin Hills Park and Recreation Council. When formed, the assessed value of the land in the district totaled $12 million, the population was about 22,000, and the budget for the first year was $65,000. William B. Pond was hired as the district's first superintendent in July 1955, and he started work in the position on September 1 at a salary of $7,500 per year.

Voters in the district approved the issuing of a $10 million bond in November 1974, but voted down an increase in the tax base in May 1978. By 1976 the district had grown to cover nearly 40 square miles (100 km^{2}) and have a total assessed value of property in the district of $1.4 billion, and a budget of almost $990,000. At that time the district had grown to over 30 parks and operated swimming pools at Beaverton High School, at Sunset High School, in Raleigh Hills, and at Somerset West-Rock Creek. The district opened a senior center in 1975 in Beaverton and named it after Elsie Stuhr.

In May 1985, two teenagers set booby traps at the district's Fir Grove Park, imitating traps they had seen in the movie First Blood, the first film in the Rambo series.

The district agreed to transfer nine parks, for a total of 56 acres (23 ha), to neighboring Hillsboro in 2002. These parks were in areas anticipated to be annexed by Hillsboro, as Hillsboro and Beaverton had agreed to a shared boundary to match school district lines, except in areas already annexed into one of those cities. Tualatin Hills received $1.1 million for the transfer of the parks. In 2004, Sports Illustrated named the district as its Sportstown for Oregon during the magazine's 50th anniversary year.

Tualatin Hills had grown to an area of 55 square miles (140 km^{2}) in 2005, with in excess of 200 parks, along with eight swimming pools. At that time the district's budget had grown to $41 million, the district served over 200,000 residents, and employed 203 people. Voters in the district approved a $100 million bond in November 2008 to both improve then existing parks and facilities, as well as purchase new park lands. It was the first bond measure passed in the district since 1996. In June 2009, Cooper Mountain Nature Park opened, with Tualatin Hills operating the Metro-owned park.

== Facilities and details ==
Tualatin Hills is the largest independent parks district in Oregon, serving over 270,000 residents as of 2026. An elected board of directors governs the district, which is headed by a president. The district's board of directors originally had three members, but now consists of five board members. Board members are elected to four-year terms. Board meetings are held monthly. Day-to-day operations of the district are overseen by the general manager (GM), which is Doug Menke who became GM in 2006. The GM oversees a total of 212 employees and an annual budget of $40 million.

Tualatin Hills has over 200 parks or facilities totaling 2,100 acres (850 ha), spread across 50 square miles (130 km^{2}) in eastern Washington County. Included in this are eight aquatic centers or outdoor swimming pools, one senior center, two nature parks, and 60 miles of trails. Major parks and facilities include the Howard M. Terpenning Recreation Complex (often locally called simply the "THPRD complex"), Conestoga Recreation and Aquatic Center, Cooper Mountain Nature Park, Tualatin Hills Nature Park, PCC Rock Creek Recreation Facility, and the Jenkins Estate. Tualatin Hills also operates a variety of athletic fields and facilities, many in-conjunction with the Beaverton School District. These include 255 sports fields, 106 tennis courts, and 92 basketball courts, among others.

=== Facility list ===
Image	Facility	Type
	Aloha Swim Center	Indoor Pool
	Beaverton Swim Center	Indoor Pool
	Cedar Hills Recreation Center	Recreation Center
	Conestoga Recreation & Aquatic Center	Indoor Pool & Recreation Center
	Cooper Mountain Nature House	Nature Center
	Elizabeth Constable & John Quincy Adams Young House	Historic Facility
	Elsie Stuhr Center	Senior Center
	Fanno Farmhouse	Historic Facility
	Garden Home Recreation Center	Recreation Center
	Harman Swim Center	Indoor Pool
	Jenkin's Estate	Historic Facility
	Raleigh Swim Center	Outdoor Pool
	Somerset West Swim Center	Outdoor Pool
	Sunset Swim Center	Indoor Pool
	Tualatin Hills Aquatic Center	Indoor Pool
	Tualatin Hills Athletic Center	Recreation Center
	Tualatin Hills Nature Park	Nature Center
	Babette Horenstein Tennis Center	Tennis Center
