= Tualatin Hills Nature Park =

Park in Beaverton, Oregon, United States

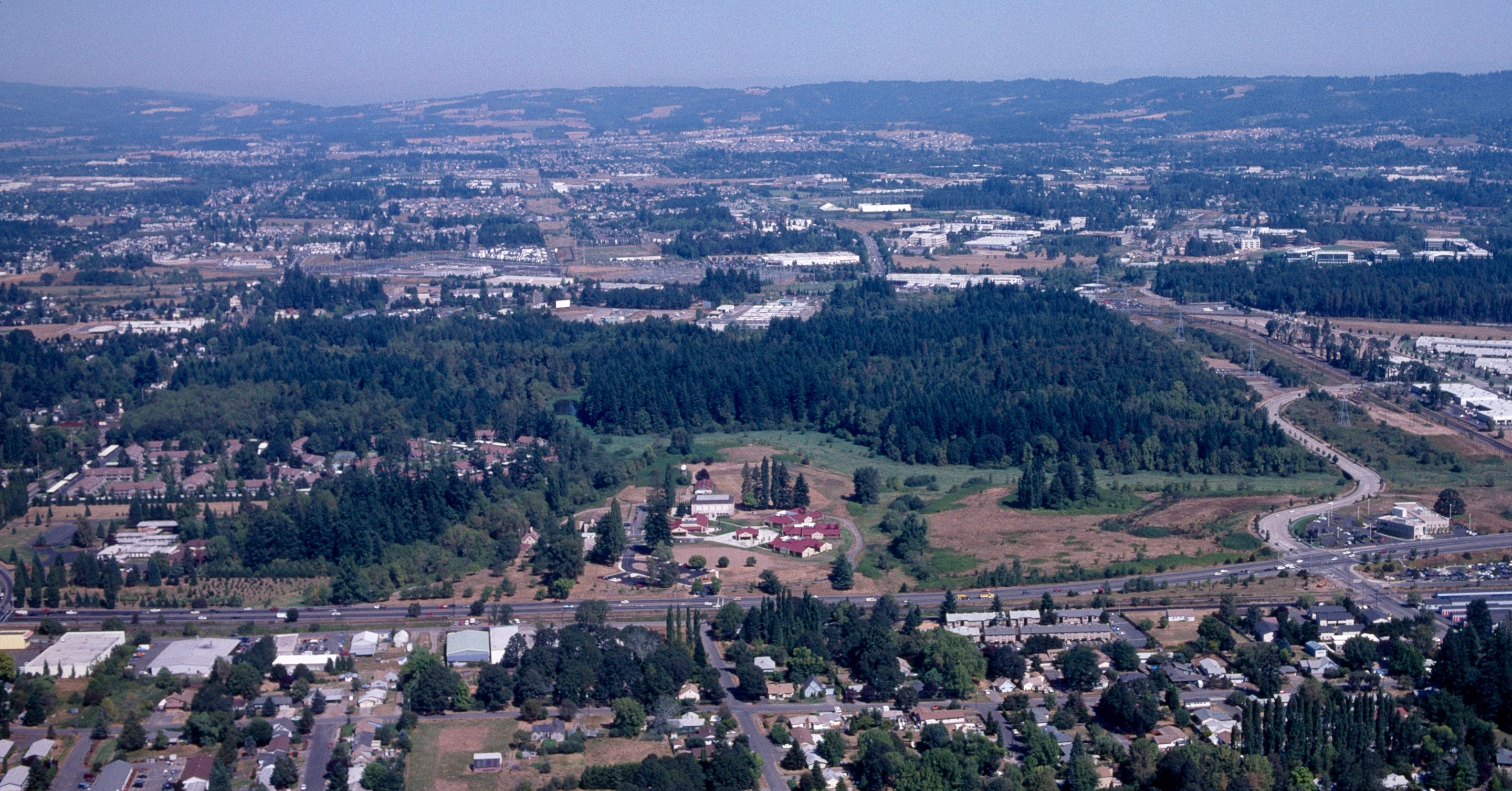
- An aerial view of the park, 1998

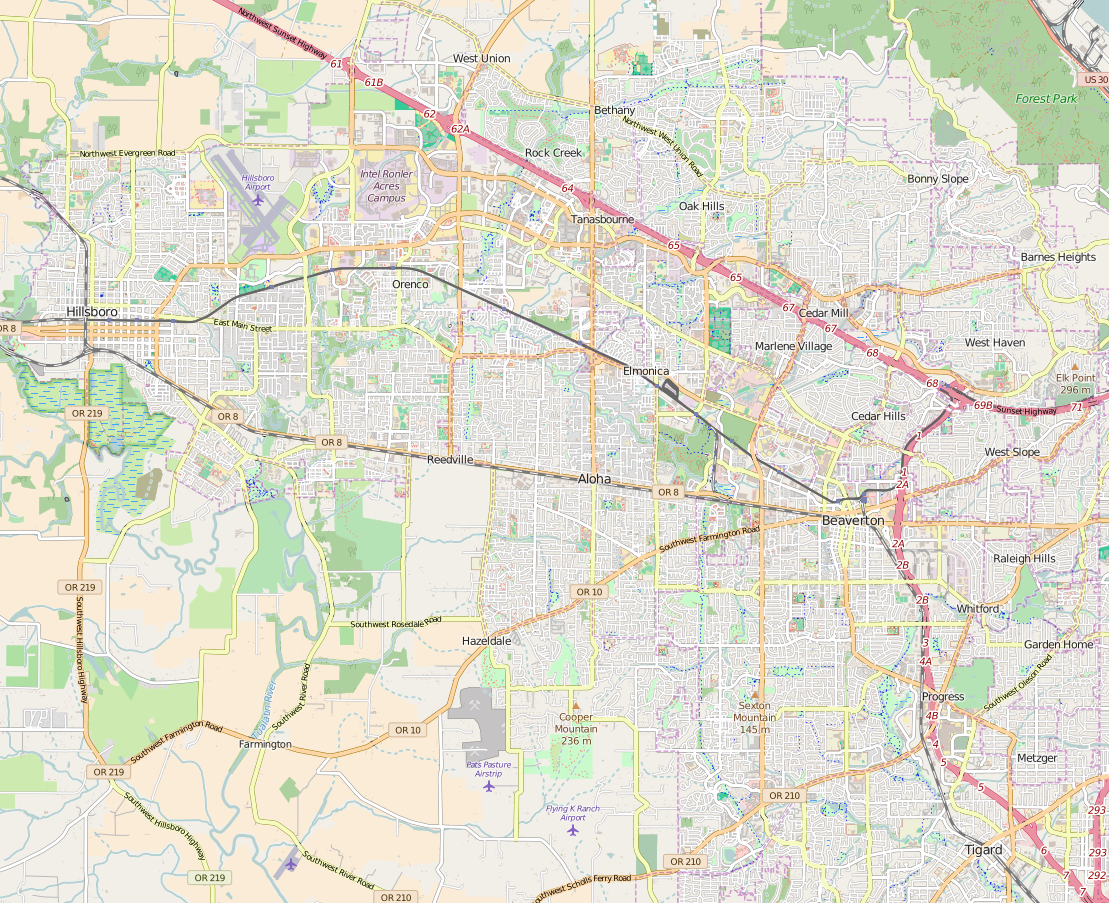
- Location within Hillsboro Beaverton OR
- Type: Public
- Location: Beaverton, Washington County, Oregon, United States
- Coordinates: 45°30′00″N 122°50′40″W
- Area: 222 acres (90 hectares)
- Created: c. 1984
- Operator: Tualatin Hills Park & Recreation District
- Status: Open
- Public transit: Beaverton Creek; Merlo Rd/SW 158th Ave
- Website: Tualatin Hills Nature Park

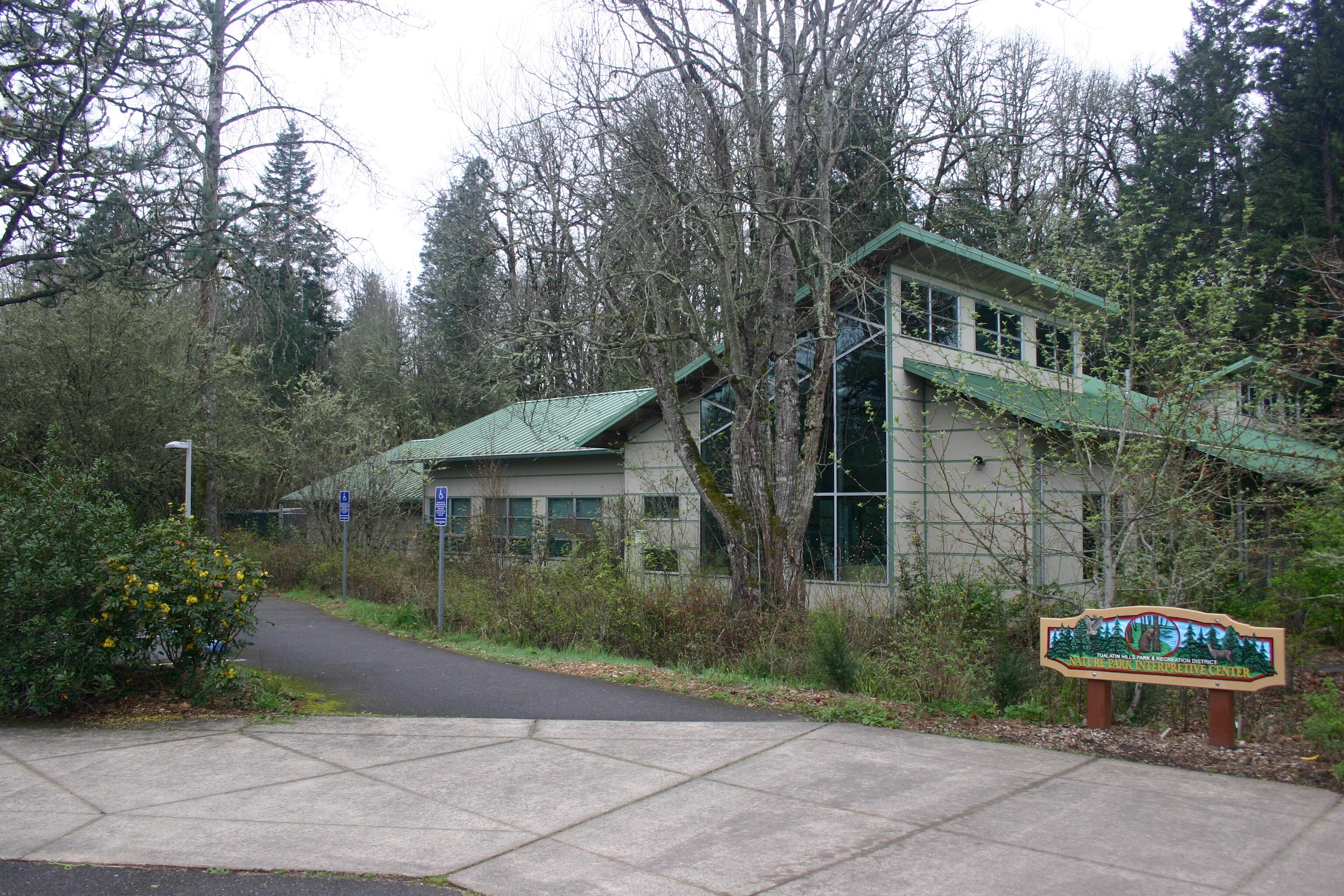
The office at the entrance to the park

The Tualatin Hills Nature Park is a 222-acre nature park and wildlife preserve in Beaverton, Oregon, owned by the Tualatin Hills Park & Recreation District (THPRD). It is one of THPRD's two nature parks along with Cooper Mountain Nature Park. The park features 5 miles (8 km) of trails, of which 1.5 miles are paved and 3.5 miles unpaved. The park features a diverse environment including several types of both evergreen and deciduous trees as well as creeks, wetlands, ponds, and meadows. Located on 15655 S.W. Millikan Way, at the main entrance to the park, is the Tualatin Hills Nature Center, formerly called the Tualatin Hills Nature Park Interpretive Center. The name was changed in November 2014. Nature supervisor Kristin Atman said that "six words is really a mouthful" and the new name would be more consistent with THPRD's other facilities.

== History ==
Before being developed with trails and opened to the public, the site was known as St. Mary's Woods. It was still known by that name when it was acquired by THPRD from the Archdiocese of Portland in 1981 after local voters approved a tax levy providing $5.5 million towards the purchase cost. By 1984, when periodic tours of the still mostly undeveloped site gave the first regular public access, the site had been named the Tualatin Hills Nature Park.

== Access ==
Although the Nature Center on Millikan Way is the primary access point, the park can also be accessed at several other locations, including two trail entrances along S.W. 170th Avenue and a trail entrance adjacent to the Merlo Rd/SW 158th Ave MAX Station. THPRD's Westside Trail skirts the east side of the park and THPRD plans to connect the park with downtown Beaverton via the Beaverton Creek Trail. Washington County has also identified potential road improvements along SW 170th Avenue, which would improve access to the park from the west.
