= Mountainside High School =

Public high school in Beaverton, Oregon

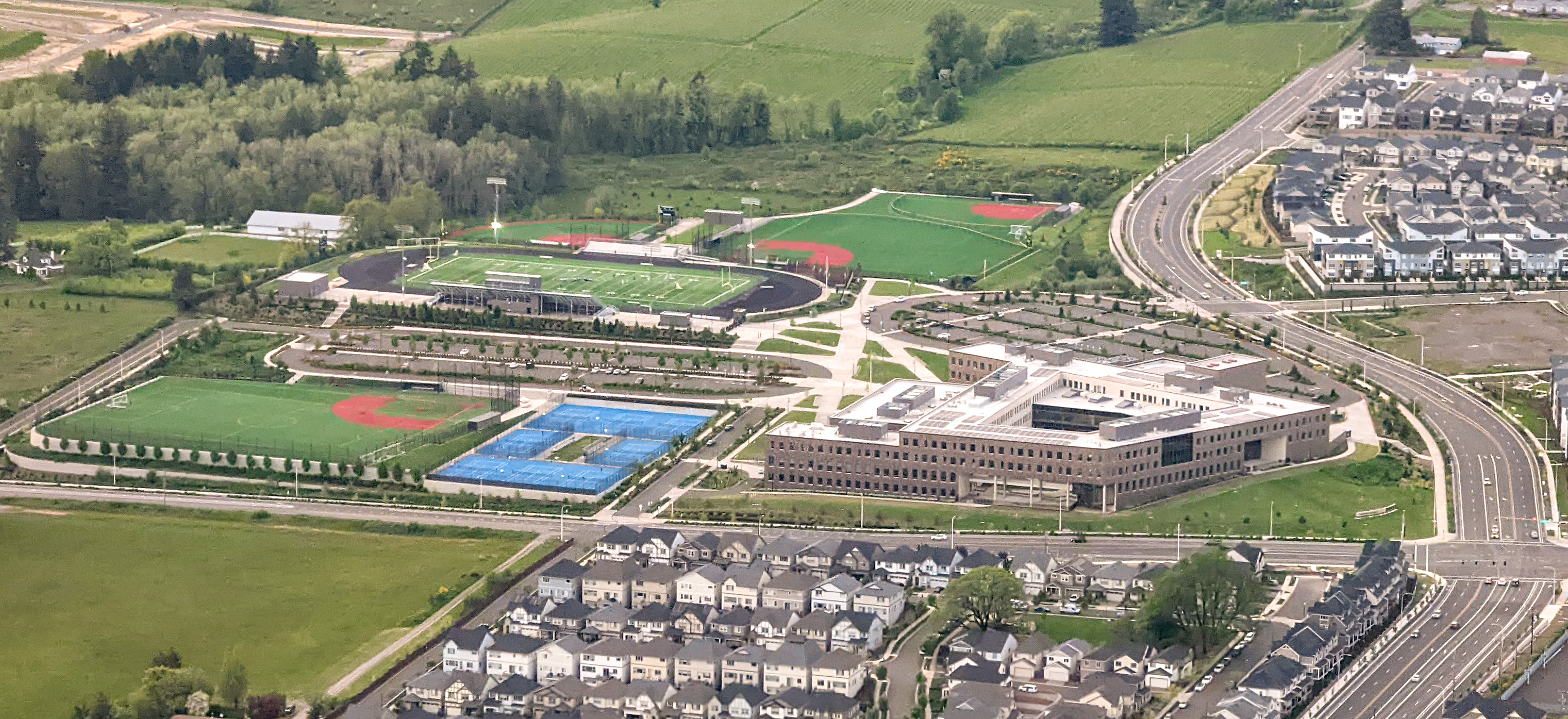

Location
- 12500 SW 175th Avenue; Beaverton, Oregon 97007; United States
- 45°25′36″N 122°51′16″W

Information
- Type: Public
- Established: September 5, 2017
- School district: Beaverton School District
- Principal: Natalie Labossiere
- Teaching staff: 78.82 (FTE)
- Grades: 9–12
- Enrollment: 1,722 (2023–24)
- Student to teacher ratio: 21.85
- Campus: Suburban
- Colors: Black, Silver, and Columbia Blue
- Athletics conference: OSAA 6A-2 Metro League
- Mascot: Maverick
- Team name: Mavericks
- Rival: Aloha High School
- Newspaper: The Peak
- Feeder schools: Conestoga Middle School, Highland Park Middle School, Mountain View Middle School
- Website: Mountainside High School

Mountainside High School (MHS) is a public high school in Beaverton, Oregon. It is the newest of six high schools in the Beaverton School District. Since its opening, the school has been an International Baccalaureate school and offers the IB Diploma Programme.

== History ==
In 2014, a $680 million bond measure was passed which would help fund 27 projects in the Beaverton School District. Nearly $158 million was used to build the school.

The school opened on September 5, 2017 as an orientation day for ninth grade students, with tenth grade students beginning the following day. For the first year of the school, only Freshmen and Sophomores attended the school (Juniors and Seniors finishing high school at their original schools) with Junior and Senior level classes being added the following years. The class of 2021 was the first graduating class to have spent all four years at the school.

Upon the opening of MHS, Beaverton School District redrew its high school boundaries. Students had formerly been zoned to Southridge High School, Beaverton High School, and Aloha High School. The neighborhood to the west of the school had previously been part of the Hillsboro School District, but this was changed upon the opening of MHS.

== Academics ==
In 2023, 95% of the school's seniors received a high school diploma. Of 433 students, 413 graduated and 20 dropped out.

== Activities ==
In June 2025, the Mountainside High School Wind Ensemble tied for 1st place in the 6A division of the OSAA State Band Championships.

== Athletics ==
Mountainside High School athletic teams compete in the OSAA 6A-2 Metro League along with other high schools in the Beaverton School District and Jesuit High School.

== Notable alumni ==
- Cameron Brink (2020), professional basketball player for the Los Angeles Sparks
