= Behdad =

Behdad is an Iranian masculine given name. Notable people with the surname include:

- Behdad Eghbali (born 1976), Iranian–American businessman
- Behdad Esfahbod (born 1982), Iranian–Canadian software engineer
- Behdad Salimi (born 1989), Iranian weightlifter
- Behdad Sami (born 1986), Iranian–American basketball player
- Behdad Namvar (born 1982), Iranian Marketing and Branding Consultant, Lecturer, and Business Development Expert

== See also ==
- Hamed Behdad (born 1973), Iranian actor and singer
