= Arts & Communication Magnet Academy =

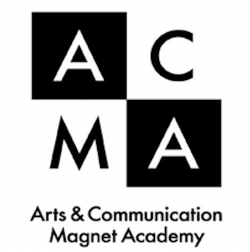

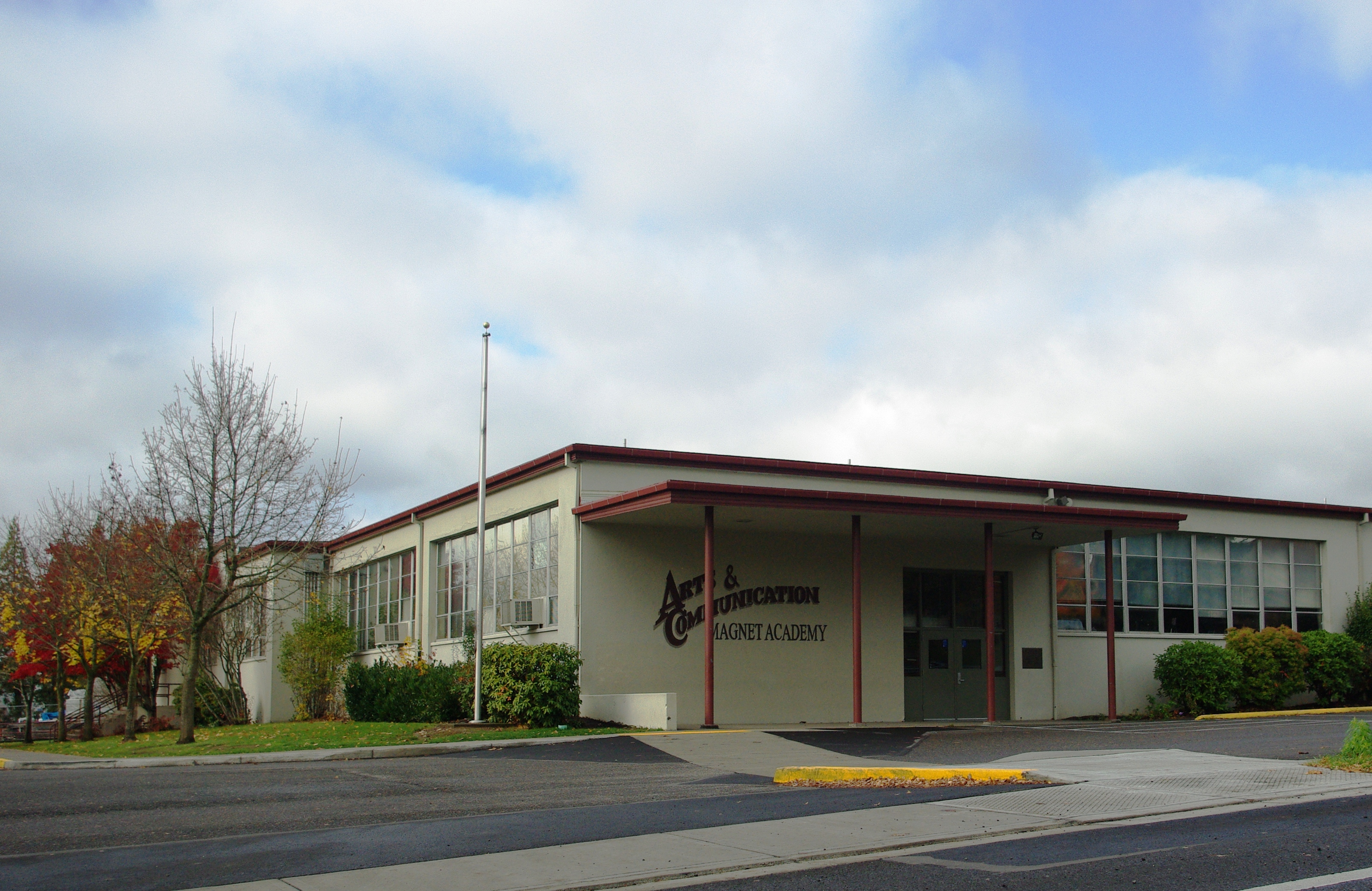

Location
- 11375 SW Center Street; Beaverton, Oregon 97005; United States; 45.494207°N 122.793355°W

Information
- Type: Public
- Opened: 1992
- School district: Beaverton School District
- Principal: Bjorn Paige
- Staff: 33.87 (FTE)
- Grades: 6-12
- Enrollment: 706 (2019-20)
- Student to teacher ratio: 20.84
- Colors: Red and Black
- Website: acma.beaverton.k12.or.us

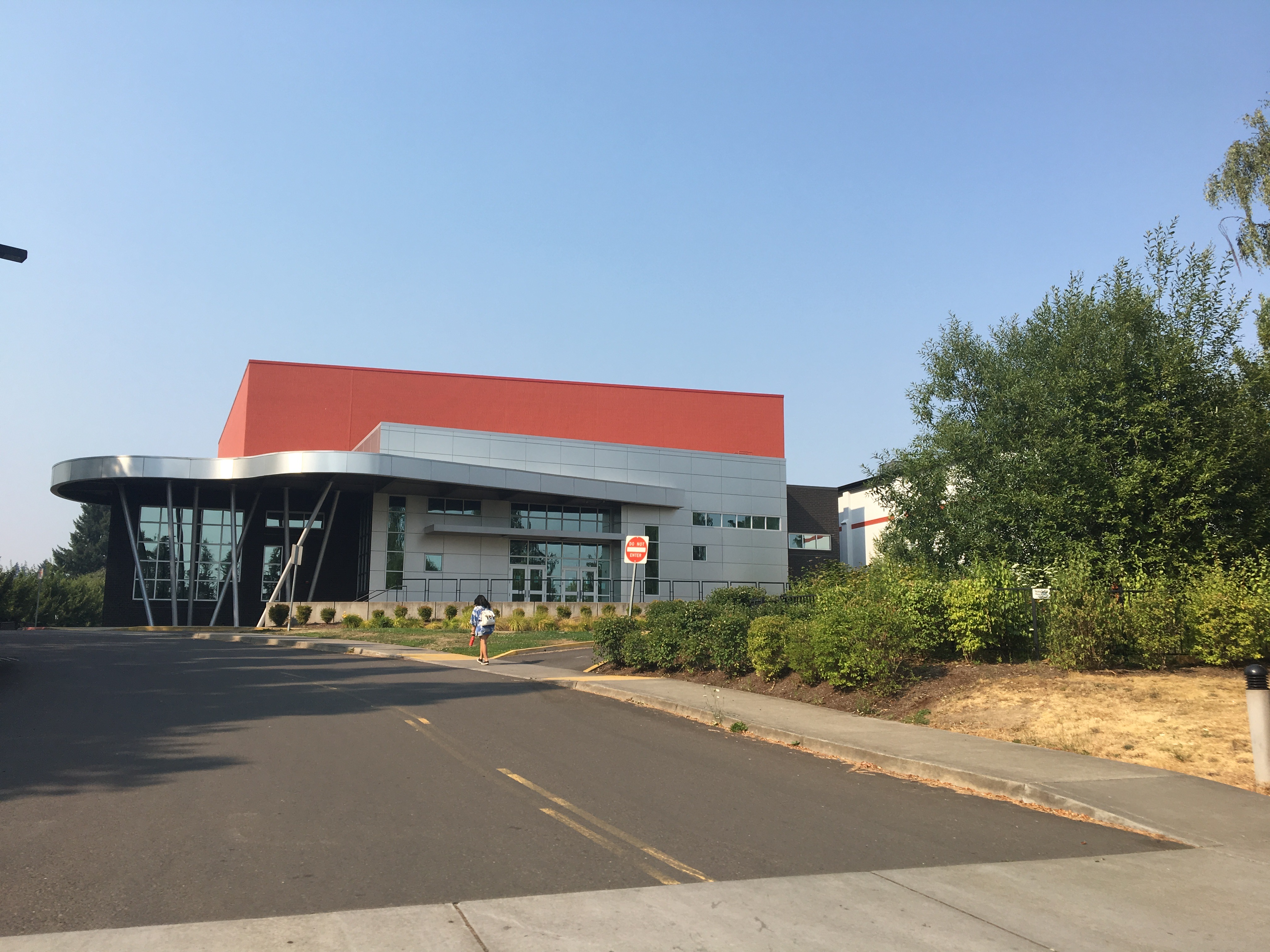
The school's Performing Arts Center

Arts & Communication Magnet Academy (ACMA) is a publicly funded arts magnet school in Beaverton, Oregon, United States. It is a member of the International Network of Schools for the Advancement of Arts Education.

The school opened in 1992, in facilities which previously served as a Beaverton School District elementary school, C.E. Mason Elementary, opened in 1949. It was originally called the Arts & Communications High School. The school was rebuilt in 2020 and reopened the school year 2021-2022, following the passage of a bond measure in May 2014.

== Academics ==
In 2008, 100% of the school's seniors received a high school diploma. Of 60 students, 60 graduated and none dropped out.

The school received a silver ranking from U.S. News & World Report's 2010 "America's Best High Schools" survey.

== Theatre company ==
The company has produced plays and musicals such as Bullshot Crummond, The Apple Tree, Midsummer Night's Dream, Much Ado About Nothing, Spoon River Anthology, The Good Doctor, Dancing at Lughnasa, Alice in Wonderland, A Greater Tuna, Celebration, The Fantasticks, Little Shop of Horrors, a production of Godspell, which was sponsored by The Oregonian, and original verbatim stage adaptations of The Great Gatsby and Great Expectations.

== Jazz orchestra ==
The ACMA jazz program consists of the beginning level Concert Band, the intermediate level Symphonic Band, and the advanced level Jazz Orchestra. ACMA jazz bands perform and compete annually in music festivals across the Pacific Northwest.

== Dance West company ==
ACMA students comprise Dance West, a pre-professional dance program. Company repertoire includes pieces based on classical ballet, jazz, historical modern, innovative hip-hop, Broadway, concert tap, and pieces that range across all genres, taught by master teachers and guest artists.

== Film Program ==
ACMA offers students the ability to pursue filmmaking studies, from which they can gain applicable skills to use in entertainment.

== Signal to Noise film festival ==
The Beaverton School District’s Signal to Noise film festival originated from Arts and Communications Magnet Academy in 2001. The event continues to be held annually across multiple schools in the beaverton school district as of 2026.

== ACMA Radio and News ==
The old school building shared space with local cable access studios and would broadcast works regularly, as “ACMA Brand Television”. Students in the 2019-2020 school year had a school program called ACMA TV, which was briefly revived in 2022.

== School newspaper ==
ACMA students ran a school newspaper named The Savant, which covered the school's activities and news, along with the local Beaverton community. It was terminated at the beginning of the 2012–2013 school year.

At the start of the 2025-2026 school year, ACMA students began running "The Palette" newspaper with monthly publications.

== Career pathways ==
- Communications Arts
  - Animation
  - Film
  - Writing
- Performing Arts
  - Dance
  - Choir
  - Orchestra
  - Jazz band
  - Theatre
- Visual Arts
  - Ceramics
  - Sculpture
  - Draw and Paint
  - Photography

== Notable alumni ==
- Alex Frost, actor
- Haruka Weiser, murder victim, class of 2015
- Aparna Brielle, actress, class of 2012
