= Beaverton School District =

School district in Oregon, United States

Coordinates: 45.5061°N 122.8484°W

Location
- Washington County, Oregon United States

District information
- Grades: K–12
- Established: 1876; 150 years ago
- Superintendent: Dr. Anthony Smith
- Budget: $622,821,541(2022–2023)

Students and staff
- Students: 39,180 (2011-22)
- Teachers: 2,512
- Staff: 4,458

Other information
- Website: www.beaverton.k12.or.us

The Beaverton School District (BSD 48J) is a school district in and around Beaverton, Oregon, United States. It serves students throughout Beaverton, Hillsboro, Aloha, and unincorporated neighborhoods of Portland, Oregon. The Beaverton Elementary School District 48 was established in 1876, with other elementary districts later merged into the district. The elementary district was later merged with the high school district (10J) to create a unified school district. It is the third-largest school district in the state, with an enrollment of 39,180 students as of 2022. For the 2022–23 school year, the district had a total budget of $622.8 million.

The district employs over 2,100 teachers at its 34 elementary, nine middle, and six high schools as well as several option schools. Mountainside High School, the district's sixth high school, opened in 2017. Tumwater Middle School (previously Timberland), the district's ninth middle school, opened in the fall of 2021.

== History ==
District 48 was established in 1876 as the "Beaverton Elementary School District", serving grades 1–8. On July 1 1960, the elementary district, as well as the Aloha-Huber #107 (of the Aloha-Huber and Beaver Acres schools), Barnes #57J (of the Barnes, Cedar Hills, West Tualatin View, and William Walker Schools), Bonny Slope, Cedar Mills #62J, Cooper Mountain #94, Garden Home #92, Hazeldale #60, McKay #18, McKinley #81, Raleigh #95 (composed of the Raleigh Hills and Raleigh Park elementary schools), and Sunset Valley #6 elementary school districts merged with the Beaverton High School District #10 to create one unified school district. The district has followed the trends throughout the US, establishing schools for 7th–9th grades in the mid-1960s (to make a 6-3-3 system) and then in 1994 moving 6th grade into middle school and 9th grade back into high school to form the current 5-3-4 configuration.

The Beaverton School District's school-age population grew by 44% in the 1990s, but by only 14% in the 2000s. The median age in the district increased from 33.3 in 2000 to 35.3 in 2010. The total population of the area under the district's jurisdiction was 253,198 as of the 2010 census.

From March 2020 to March 2021, all students were instructed remotely either through online learning or through comprehensive distance learning. Return to in-person instruction began in April, 2021 with a hybrid model. About half of the district's students chose in-person hybrid instruction with the rest choosing to continue comprehensive distance learning

== Boundary ==
The district's service area in Washington County includes almost all of Beaverton, portions of Hillsboro and Tigard, all of the census-designated places of Cedar Hills, Garden Home–Whitford, Marlene Village, and Oak Hills, and portions of the census-designated places of Aloha, Bethany, Cedar Mill, Metzger, Raleigh Hills, Rockcreek, and West Slope.

The district extends into Multnomah County, where it includes a small portion of Portland.

== Schools ==
=== Elementary schools ===
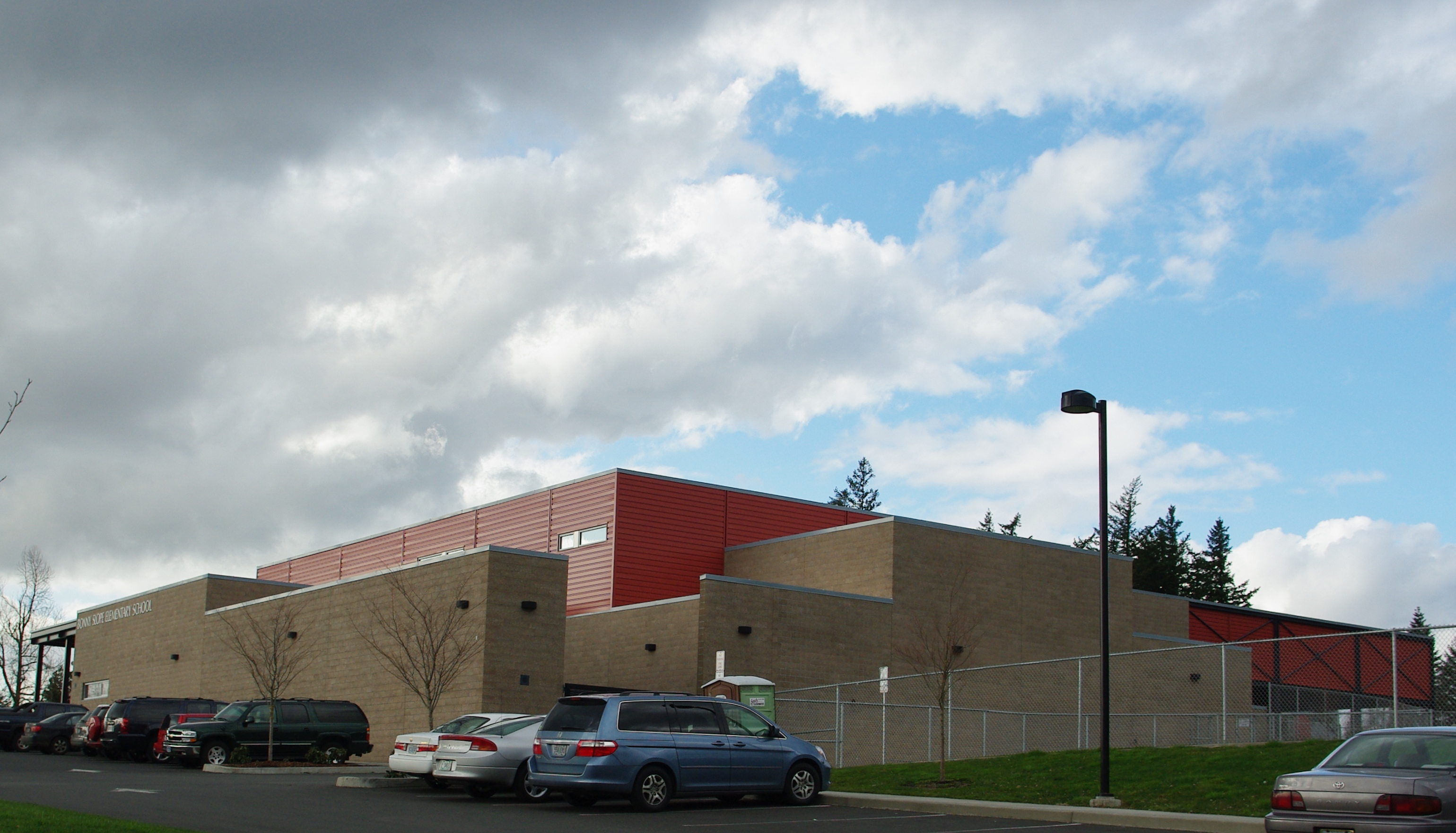
Bonny Slope

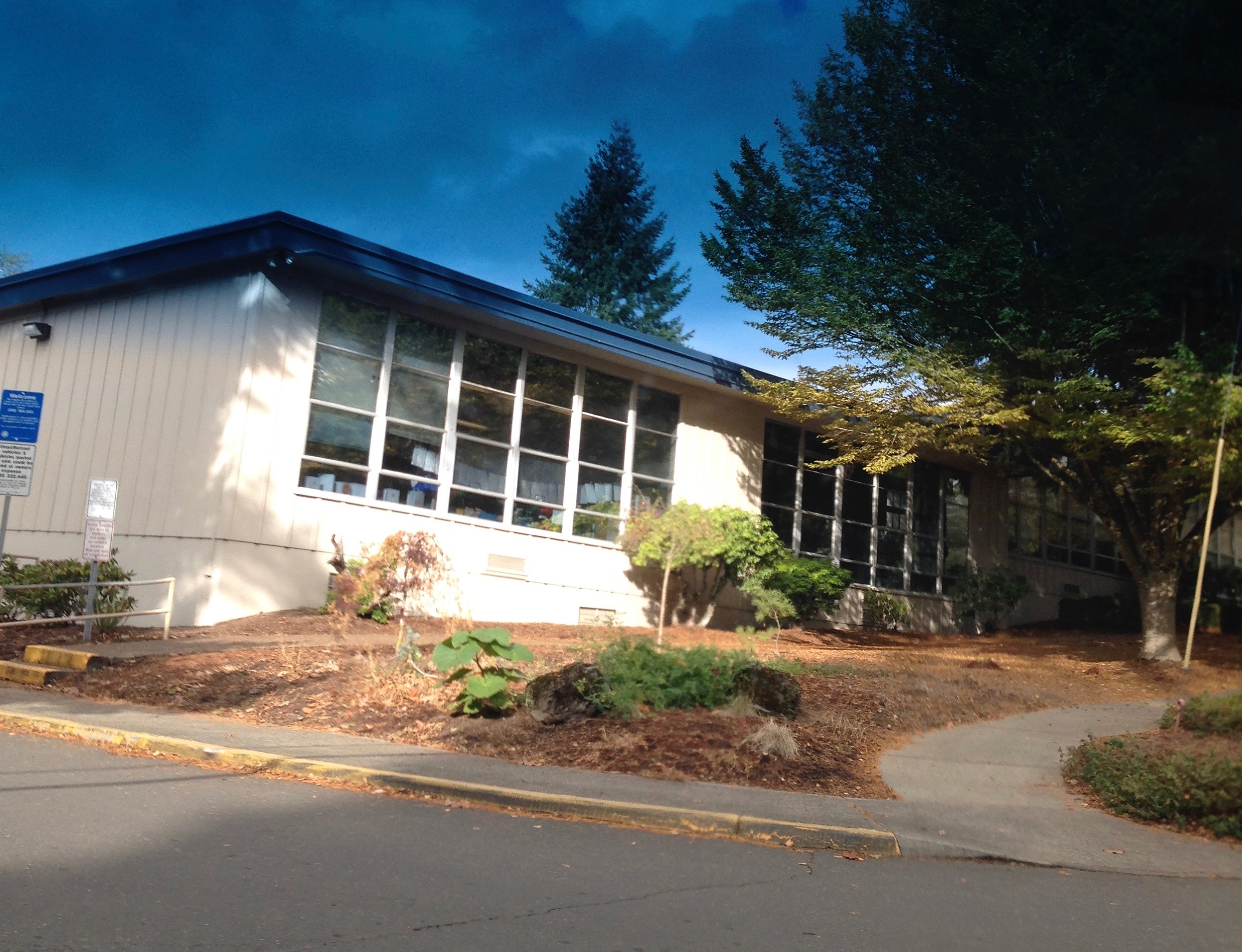
Cedar Mill

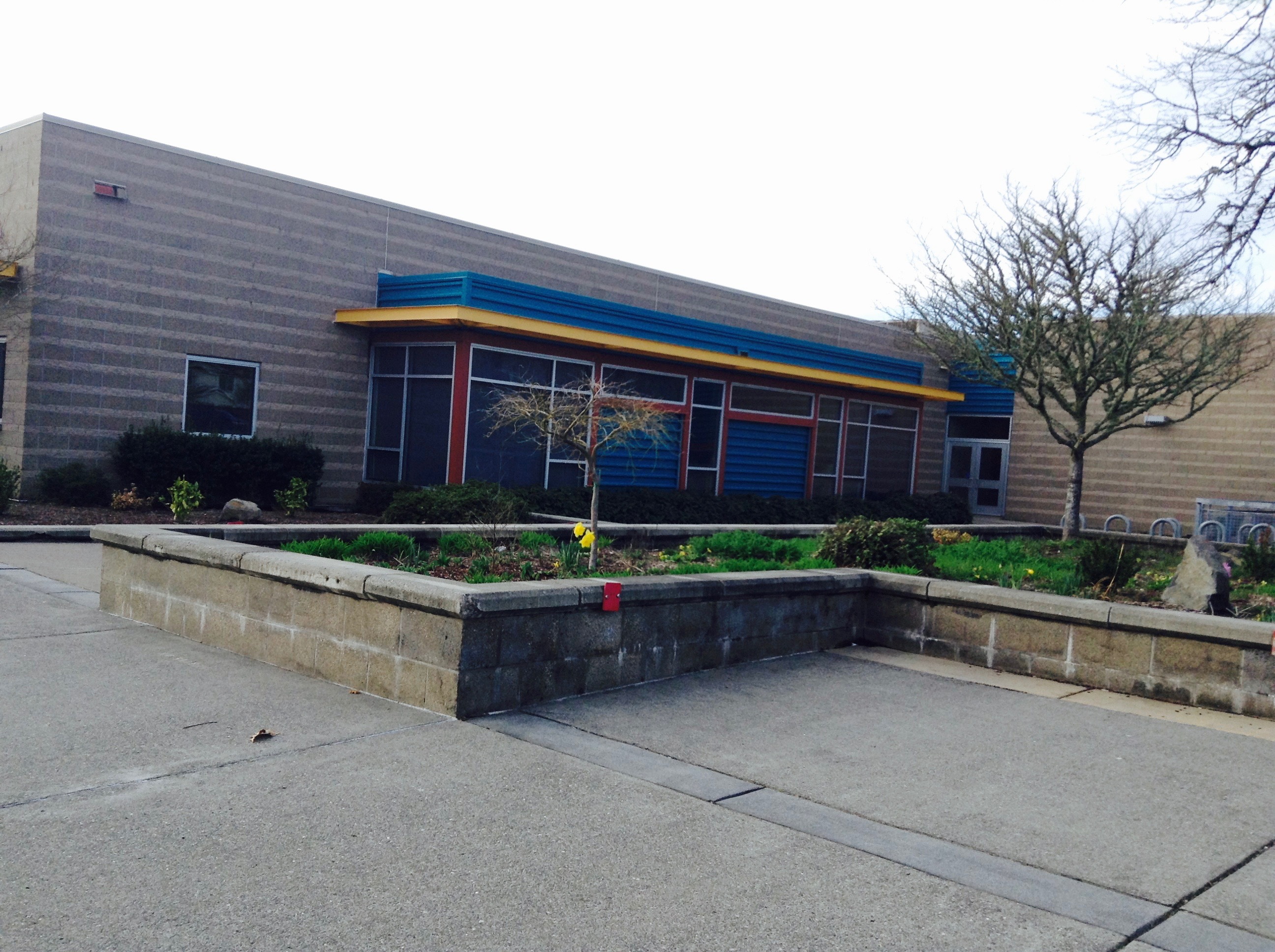
Jacob Wismer

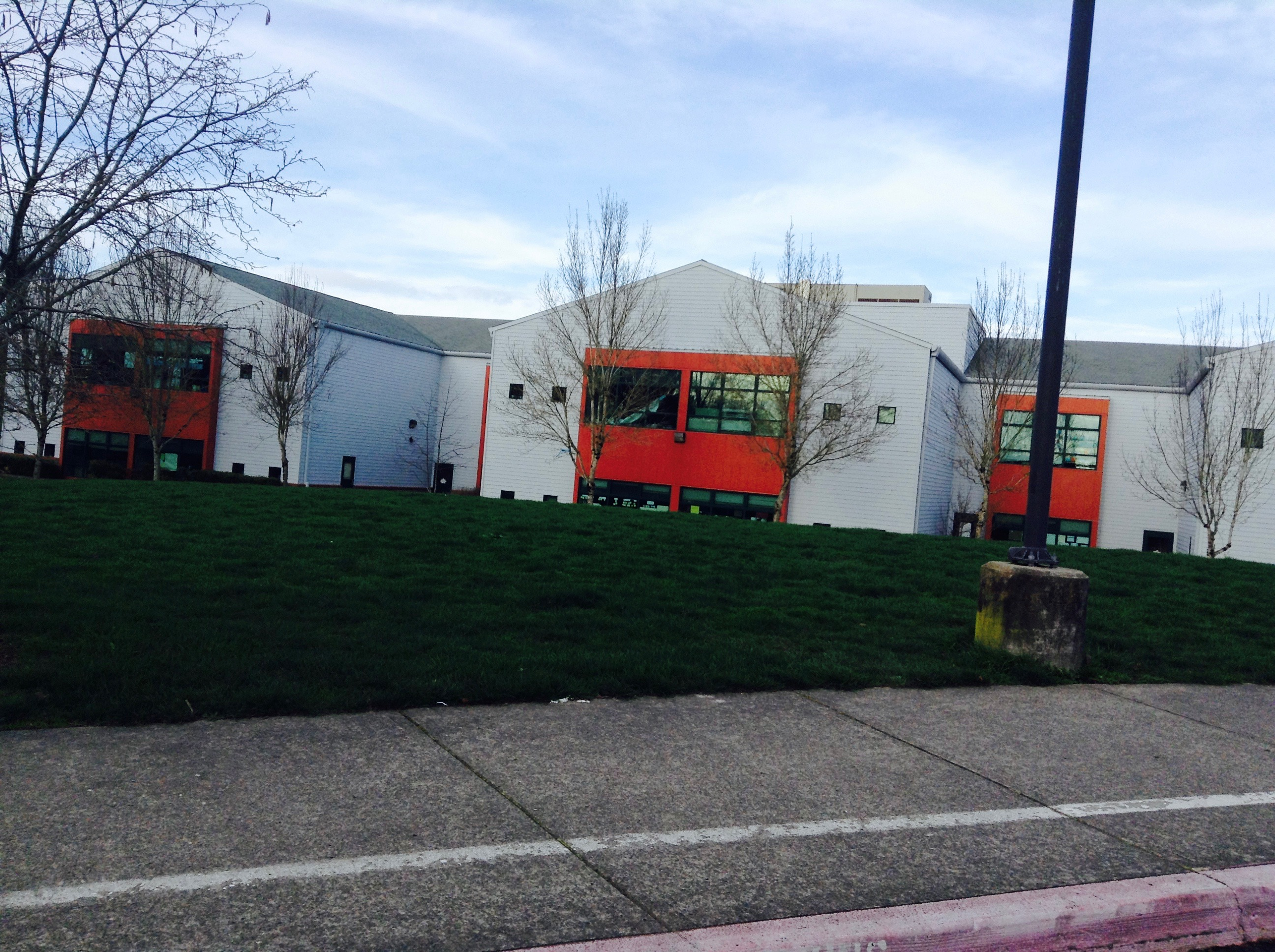
Findley

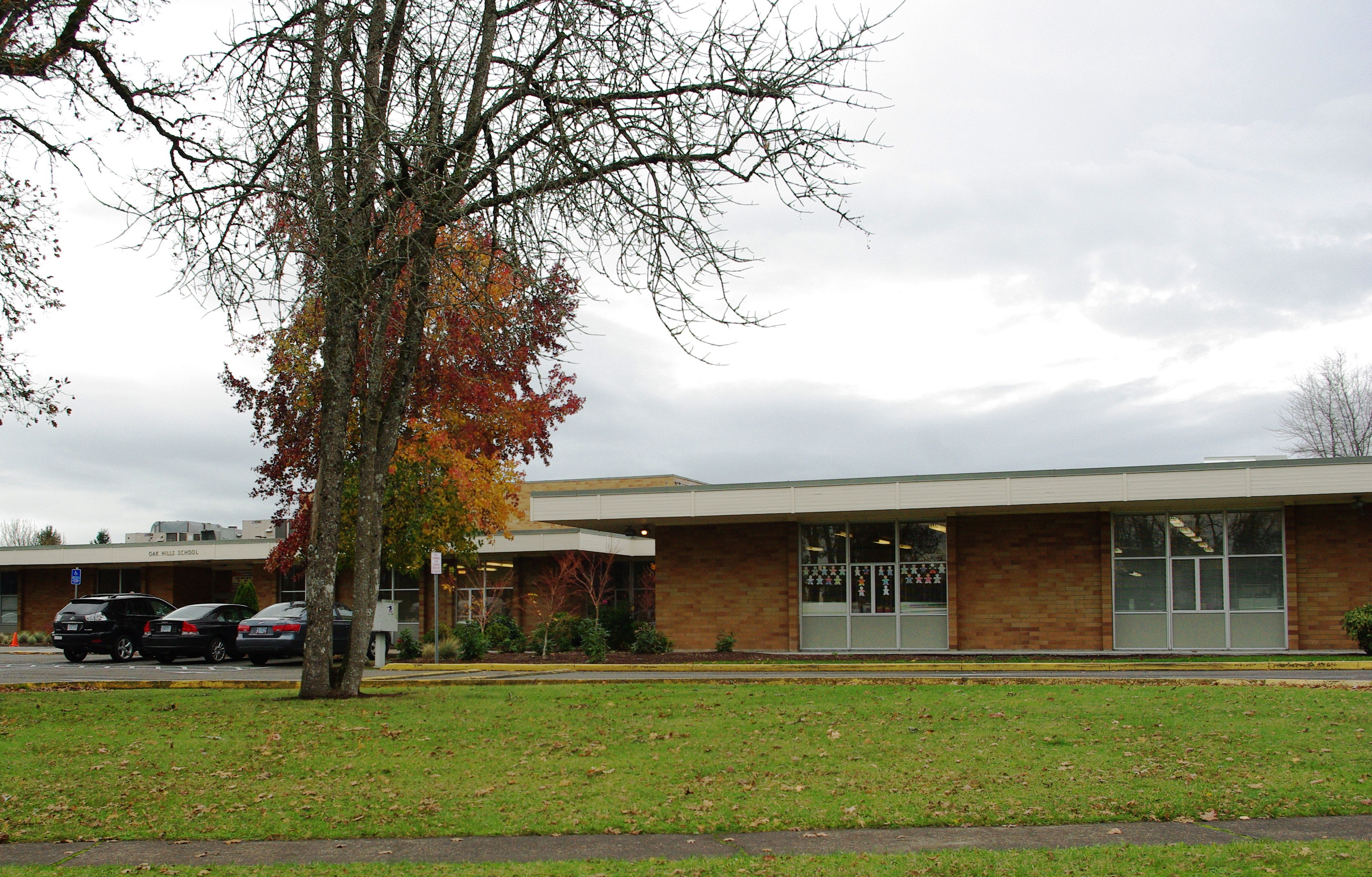
Oak Hills

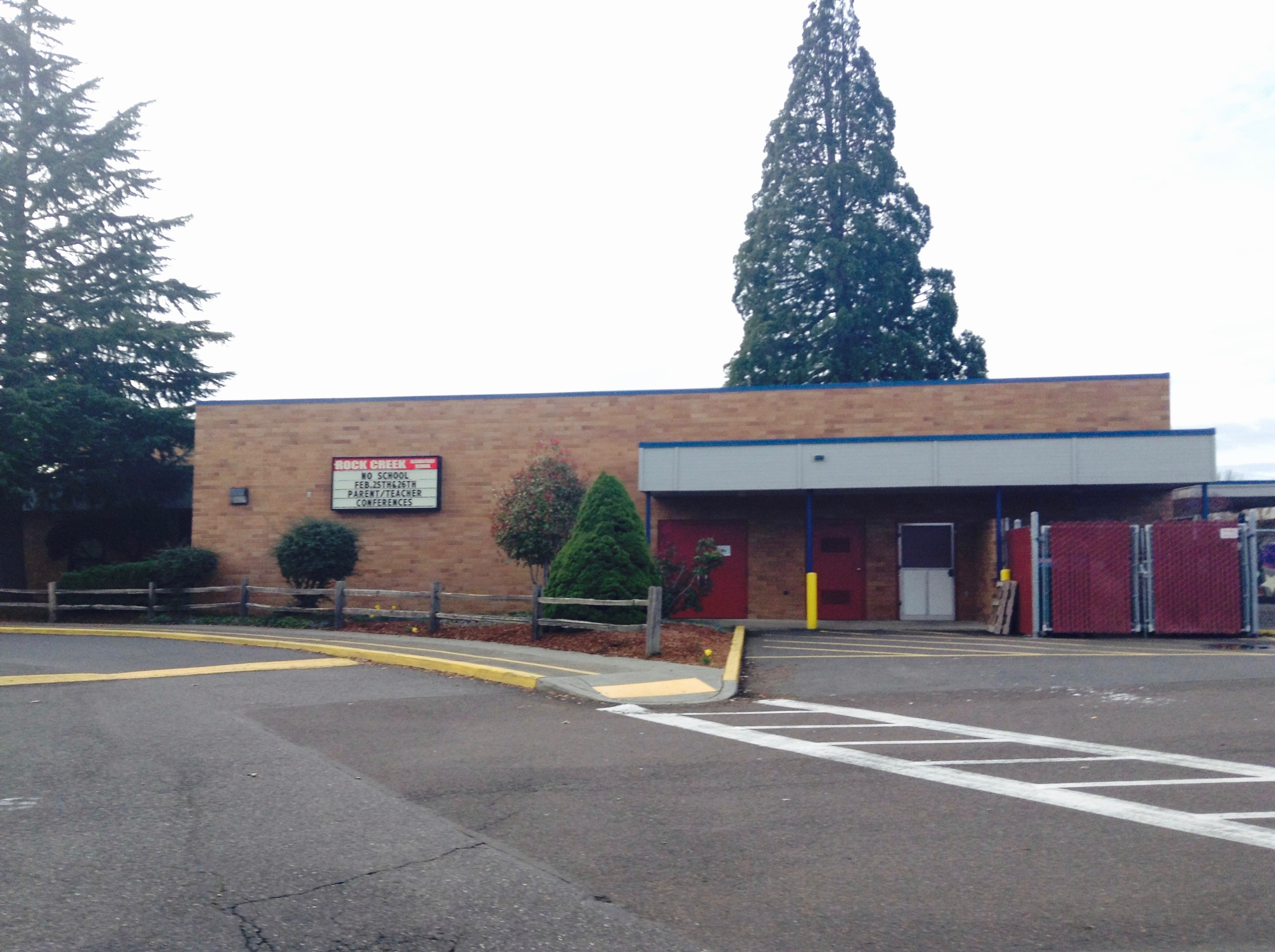
Rock Creek

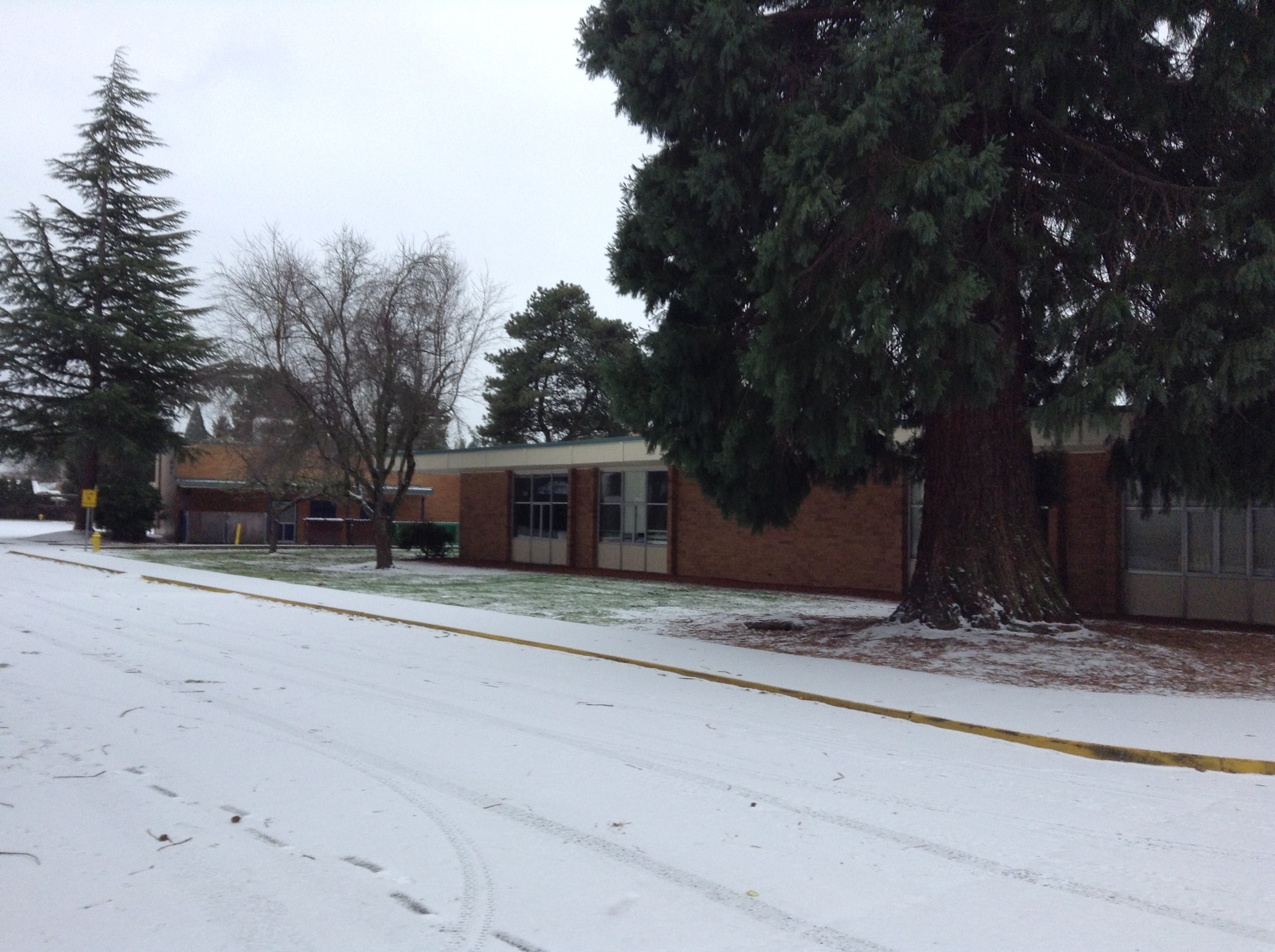
Terra Linda

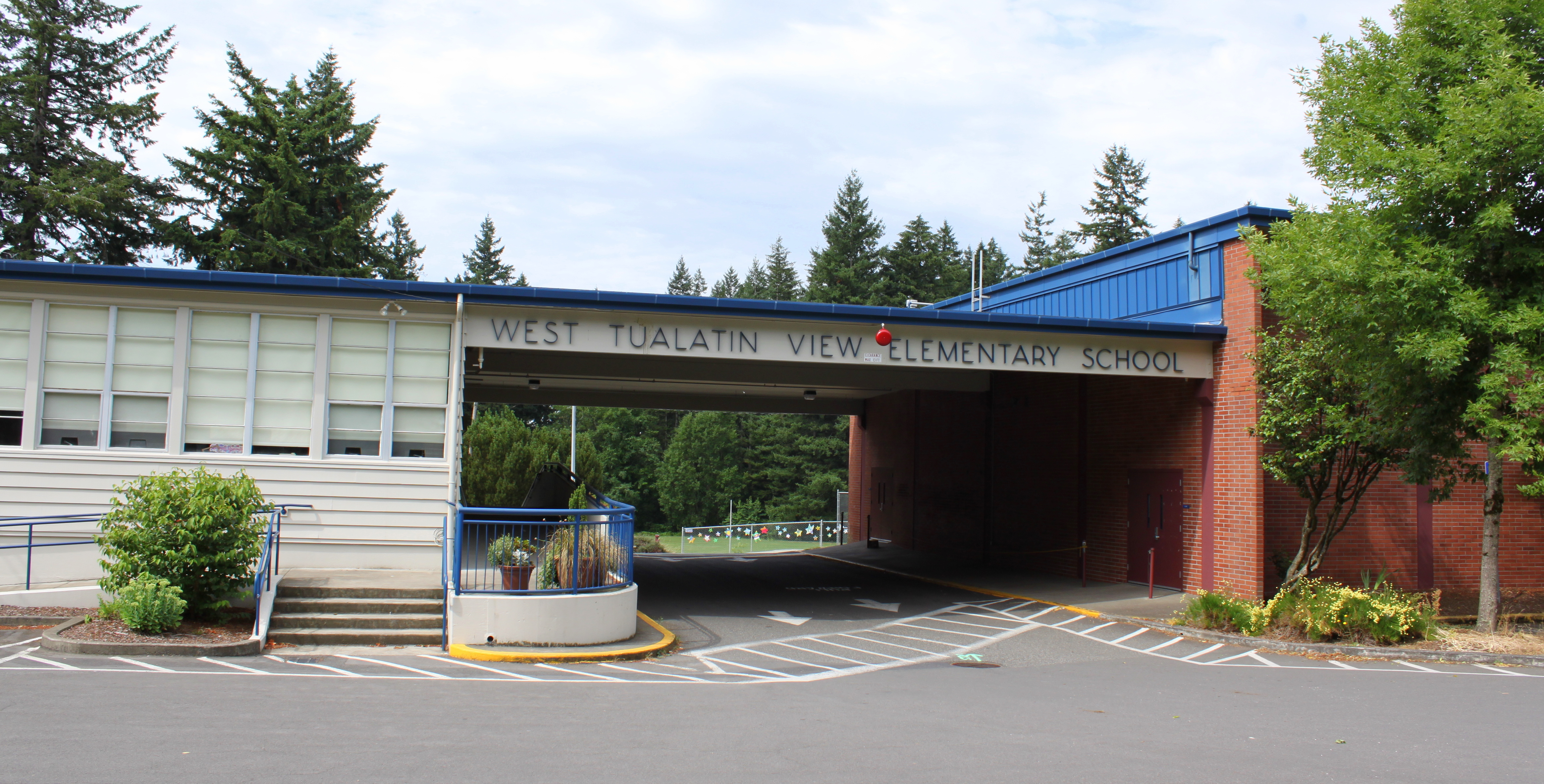
West Tualatin View

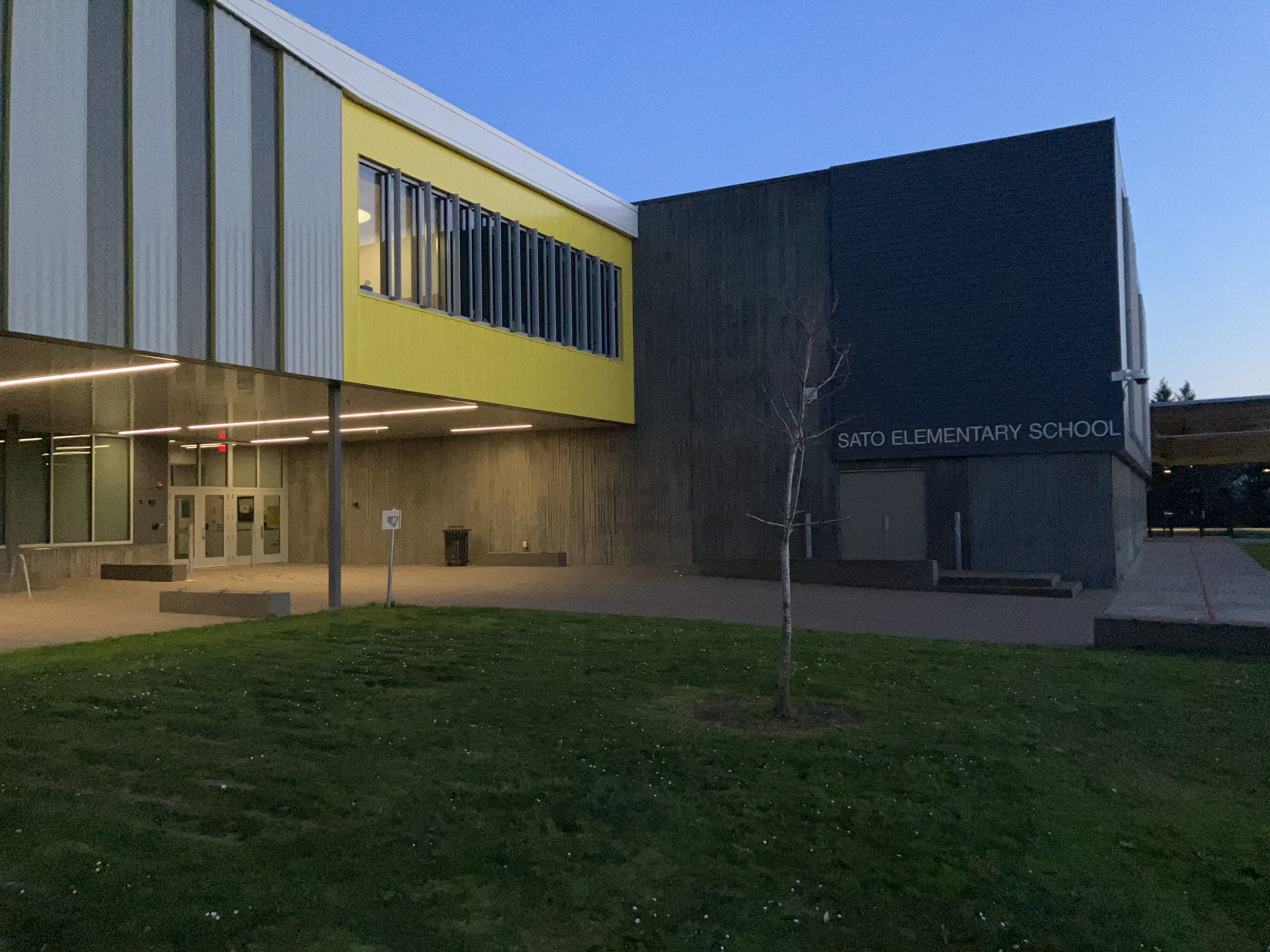
Sato

School	Enrollment*	Mascot	Principal	Feeder to
Aloha–Huber Park**	992	Cougar	Sarita Amaya	Mountain View
Barnes	478	Bobcat	Edgar Solares	Meadow Park
Beaver Acres	727	Beaver	Angela Tran	Meadow Park
Bethany	429	Bobcat	Toni Rosenquist	Five Oaks
Bonny Slope	683	Bobcat	Cary Meier	Tumwater
Cedar Mill	356	Lumberjack	Amy Chamberlain	Tumwater
Chehalem	372	Mustang	Melissa Holz	Cedar Park, Mountain View
Cooper Mountain	392	Cougar	Ali Montelongo	Highland Park, Mountain View
Elmonica	418	Engineer	Kalay McNamee	Five Oaks, Meadow Park
Errol Hassell	355	Hornet	Paul Marietta	Mountain View
Findley	527	Dragon	Sherry Marsh	Tumwater
Fir Grove	362	Furry Grover	Erin Miles	Highland Park
Greenway	273	Cougar	Jennifer Whitten	Conestoga
Hazeldale	412	Hawk	Bao Vang	Highland Park, Mountain View
Hiteon	477	Hawk	Janet Maza	Conestoga
Jacob Wismer	592	Proboscis Monkeys	Laurie Huntwork	Stoller
Kinnaman	460	Coyote	Ashlee Hudson	Mountain View
McKay	249	Wolf	Erin Kollings	Conestoga, Whitford
McKinley	628	Mountain Lion	Brian Curl	Five Oaks, Meadow Park
Montclair	283	Red-Tailed Hawk	Angee Silliman	Whitford
Nancy Ryles	507	Crocodile	Monica Arbow	Conestoga, Highland Park
Oak Hills	485	Otter	Thao Do Gwilliam	Five Oaks, Tumwater
Raleigh Hills**	307	Panther	Jennifer DeMartino	Whitford
Raleigh Park	299	Tiger	Aki Mori	Whitford
Ridgewood	371	Roadrunner	Meghan Warren	Cedar Park
Rock Creek	431	Rocket	Tiffany Wiencken	Five Oaks
Sato	762	Raccoon	Annie Pleau	Stoller
Scholls Heights	619	Knight	Tracy Bariao-Arce	Conestoga
Sexton Mountain	440	Eagle	Cherie Reese	Highland Park
Springville**	767	Wolf	Christy Batsell	Stoller
Terra Linda	258	Tiger	Wendy Bernard	Tumwater
Vose	694	Owl	Monique Singleton	Whitford
West Tualatin View	305	All-Star	Scarlet Valentine	Cedar Park
William Walker	503	Wildcat	Derek Johnston	Cedar Park

*Enrollment numbers are for 2022–23 school year.

**Springville and Raleigh Hills were previously K–8 schools, with a choice for students in grades 6–8 to remain but were transitioned to K–5 in the 2023–24 school year. Aloha–Huber Park remains a K-8 for dual language immersion students.

=== Middle schools ===
The Beaverton School District operates nine middle schools housing 6th, 7th, and 8th grades. Prior to the 1994–95 school year they housed students in grades 7–9, as a part of the district's 6-3-3 plan established in the 1960s.

Name	Enrollment*	Mascot	Principal	Feeder to
Cedar Park	644	Timberwolf	Shannon Anderson	Beaverton High School
Conestoga	810	Cougar	Jared Freeman	Mountainside, Southridge
Five Oaks	789	Falcon	Kelly Laverne	Westview High School
Highland Park	635	Husky	Kirsti Guidoux	Mountainside, Southridge
Meadow Park	681	Eagle	Johanna Castillo	Aloha, Beaverton, Sunset
Mountain View	834	Mountaineer	Wendy Rider	Aloha, Mountainside
Stoller	1032	Jaguar	Grant Piros	Sunset, Westview
Tumwater	1003	Rapids	Matthew Smith	Sunset High School
Whitford	773	Wildcat	Zan Hess	Beaverton, Southridge

*Enrollment numbers are estimations for 2025–2026 school year.

=== High schools ===
High schools in Beaverton are part of the 6A-2 Metro League for interscholastic athletics and activities. The newest, Mountainside High School, opened in September 2017 for freshmen and sophomores. As a result, the district began planning to alter its high school boundaries. The boundary changes were approved in June 2017 and went into effect at the beginning of the 2017–18 school year.

Image	School	Enrollment*	Mascot	Principal	Feeder schools
	Aloha High School	1,609	Warrior	Matt Casteel	Meadow Park Middle School Mountain View Middle School
	Beaverton High School	1,430	Beaver	Andrew Kearl	Cedar Park Middle School Meadow Park Middle School Whitford Middle School
	Mountainside High School	1,715	Maverick	Natalie Labossiere	Conestoga Middle School Highland Park Middle School Mountain View Middle School
	Southridge High School	1,460	Skyhawk	David Nieslanik	Conestoga Middle School Highland Park Middle School Whitford Middle School
	Sunset High School	1,903	Apollo	Elisa Schorr	Meadow Park Middle School Stoller Middle School Tumwater Middle School
	Westview High School	2,353	Wildcat	Matt Pedersen	Five Oaks Middle School Stoller Middle School

*Enrollment numbers are for 2022–23 school year.

=== Option schools ===
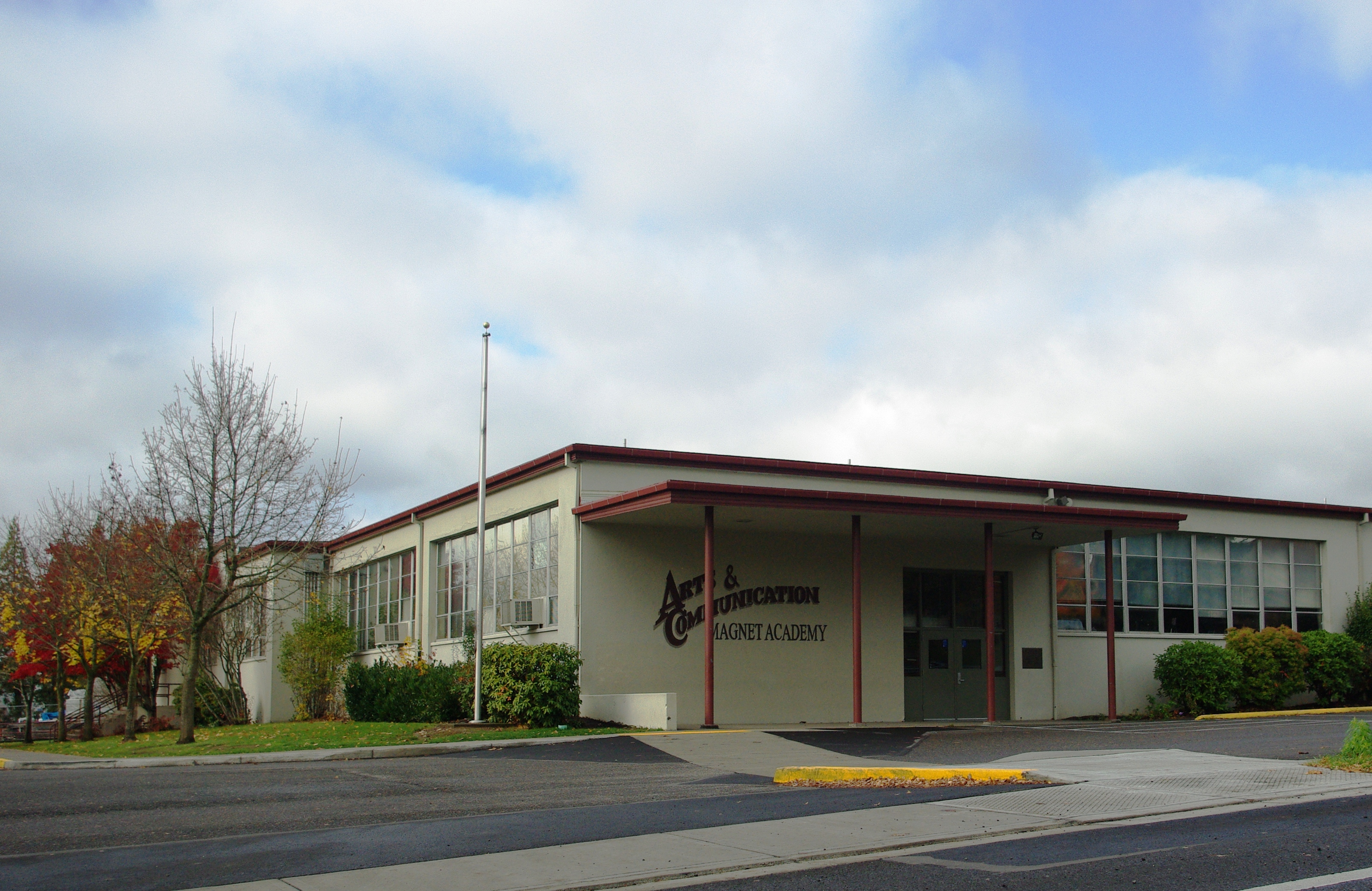
ACMA

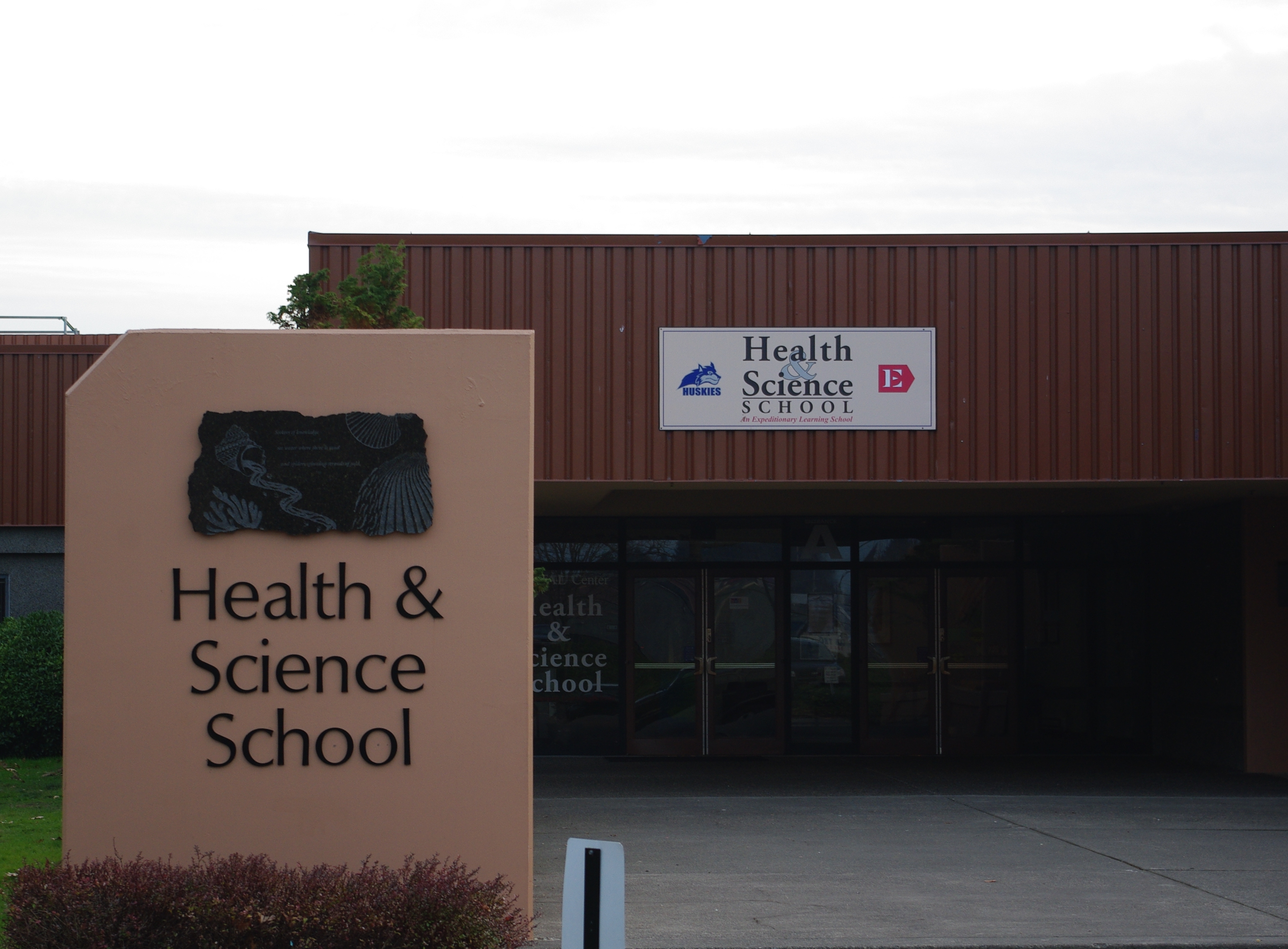
HS2

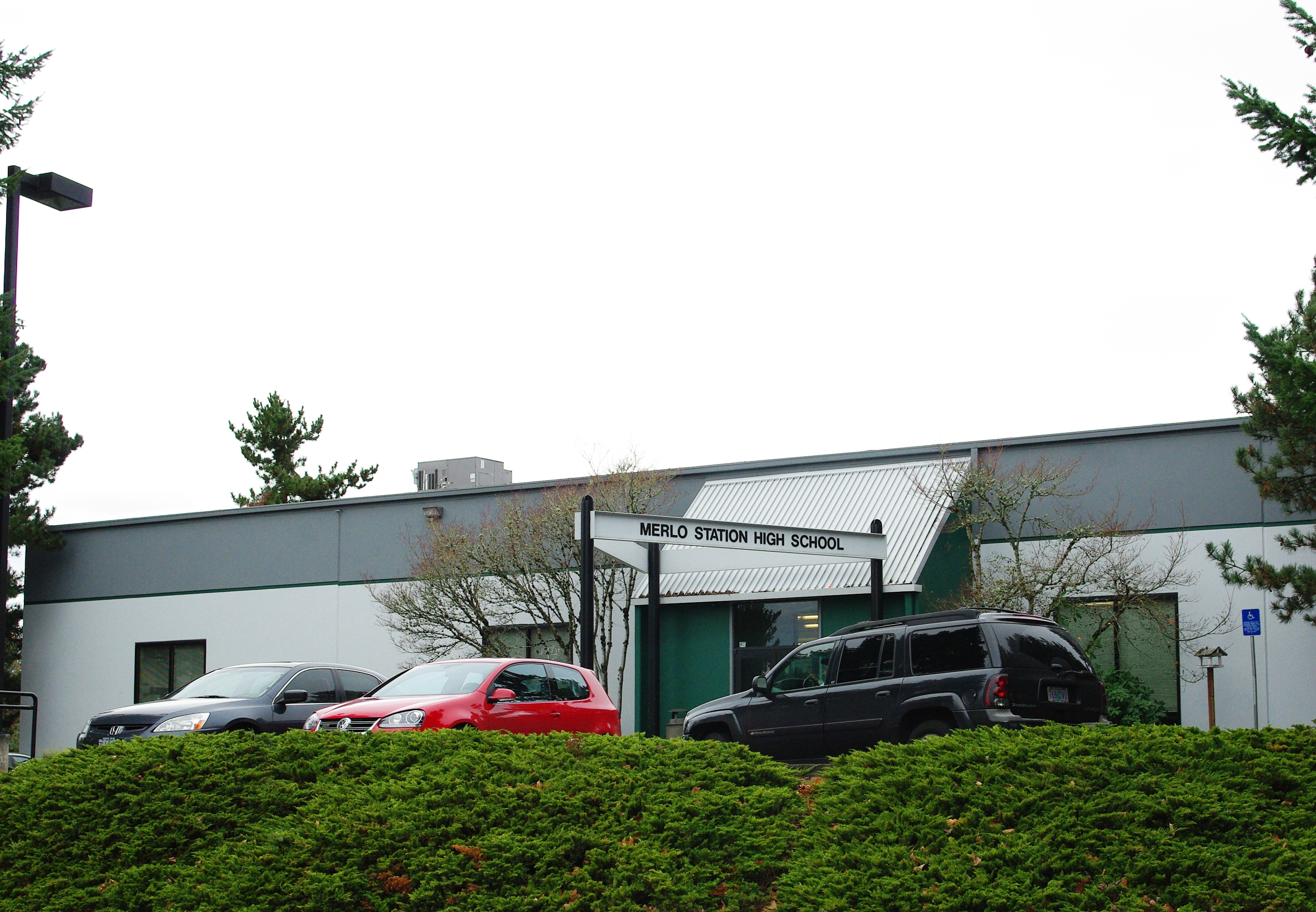
Merlo Station

==== Arts & Communication Magnet Academy (ACMA) ====
- Focuses on the arts for 6th through 12th grade students. Principal: Bjorn Paige.

==== Beaverton Academy of Science and Engineering (BASE) ====
- A merger of the former schools Beaverton Health & Science School and School of Science and Technology. Principal: Diane Fitzpatrick.

==== International School of Beaverton (ISB) ====
- Offers the International Baccalaureate program for 6th through 12th grade students. Principal: Andrew Gillford.

==== Merlo Station High School (MSHS) ====
- Houses Community School and Merlo Station Night School. Principal: Rachel Sip.

==== Rachel Carson Environmental Middle School (RCEMS) ====
- Located at Cedar Park Middle School, it focuses on environmental science for 6th through 8th grade students. Principal: Shirley Brock.

==== Summa ====
- Programs at Meadow Park, Stoller, Tumwater, and Whitford middle schools for talented and gifted students. 681 students were enrolled in Summa classes at five middle schools for the 2022–23 school year.
- In November 2014 a plan to move Summa students who attend Stoller Middle School to the newly constructed Tumwater middle school as a solution to overcrowding was proposed, but was delayed in November 2015 due to opposition from parents and school administration.

=== Closed schools ===
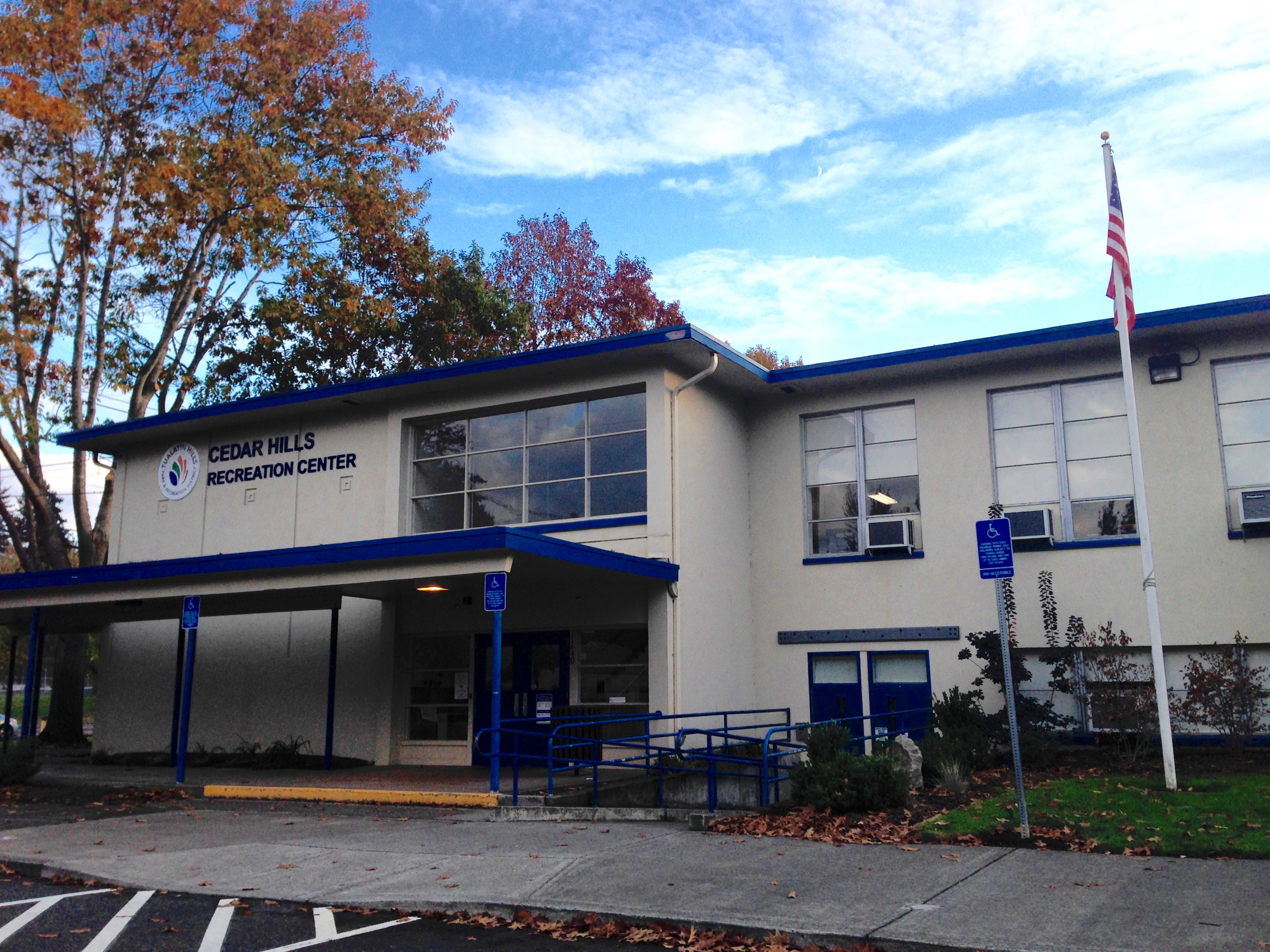
The former Cedar Hills Elementary School building, now repurposed as the Cedar Hills Recreation Center.

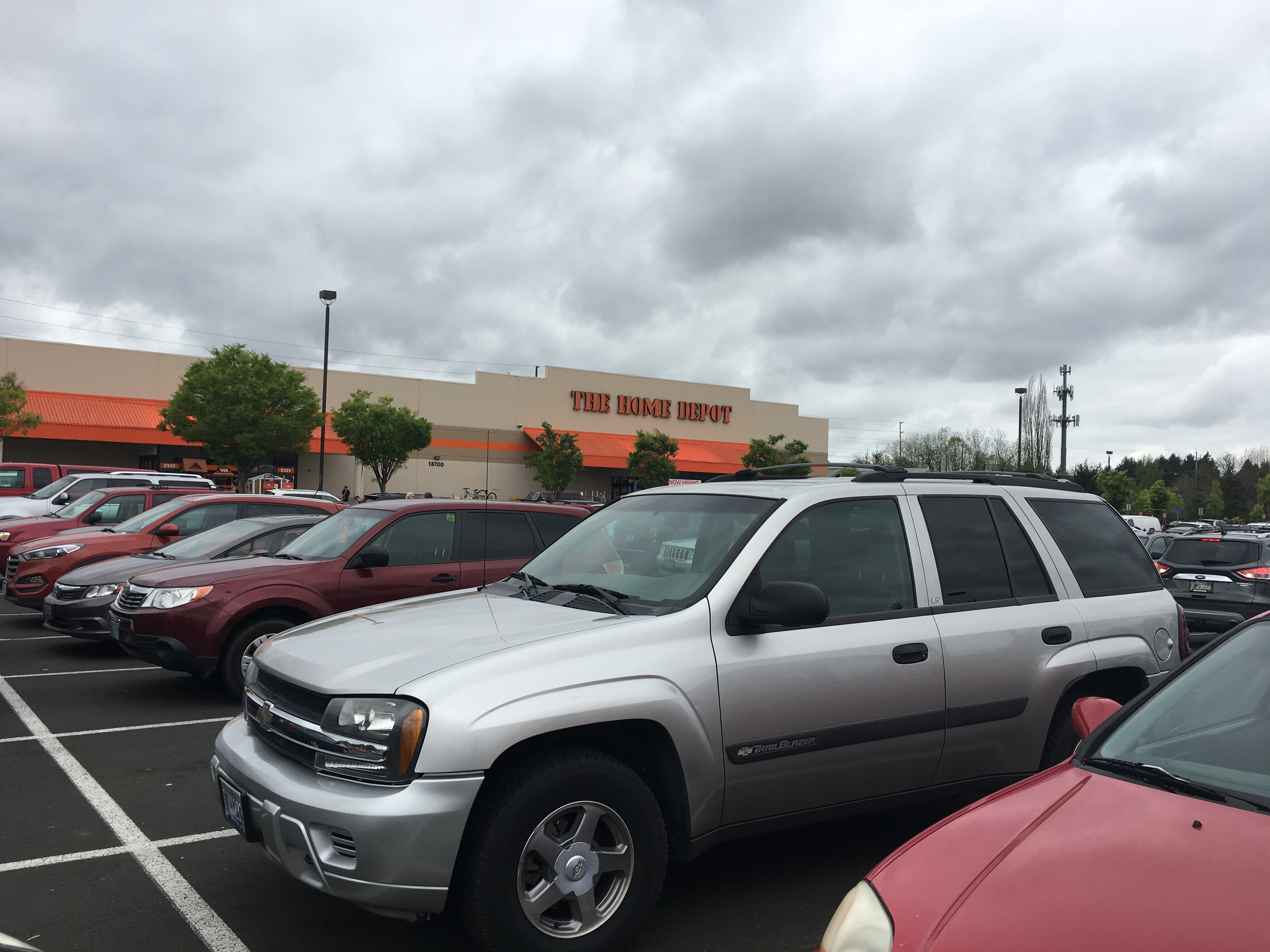
The Home Depot store at the former location of Sunset Valley Elementary School.

==== Cedar Hills Elementary School ====
- Built in the early 1950s; closed in 1983. The building was repurposed as the Cedar Hills Recreation Center of the Tualatin Hills Park & Recreation District (THPRD), initially leased from BSD, but sold to THPRD circa late 1986.

==== Garden Home Elementary School ====
- Closed in 1982 and leased to THPRD, who put it to use as the Garden Home Community Center starting later the same year. The building was later sold to THPRD.

==== Merle Davies Elementary School (named Beaverton Grade School until 1949) ====
- Opened in 1938; closed in 1983. Upon closure, the building became an annex to Beaverton High School (located adjacent) until 2024, when the building was demolished to make room for construction of a new building for the high school.

==== Sunset Valley Elementary School ====
- Opened in 1948, and closed in 1980. The building and property were purchased in 1979 by Electro Scientific Industries, which used it until the mid-1990s. That building was since razed and replaced by a Home Depot.

==== C. E. Mason Elementary School ====
- The building is now used as Arts & Communication Magnet Academy.

==== Bonny Slope Elementary School (Original) ====
- Remained open until an unknown date between 1982 and 1989. The building would eventually be used for Terra Nova High School, beginning in 2005.

== Administration ==
=== Superintendent ===
The current Beaverton School District superintendent is Dr. Anthony Smith, effective July 1, 2026.

== Demographics ==
Older Beaverton School District logo, used before 2011

2011–2026 version of current logo

In the 2009 school year, the district had 1114 students classified as homeless by the state's Department of Education, or 3.0% of students in the district. By 2010, the number of homeless students had grown to 1,580, the highest of any school district in the state.

=== Teacher/student ratios ===
The following are the district's teacher/student staffing ratios (K–5 numbers have been updated for the 2019–20 school year):

- Kindergarten – 1:26.95
- Grades 1–5 – 1:30.48
- Grades 6–8 – 1:35.50
- Grades 9–12 – 1:26.4

=== Student/staff profiles ===
All information below is as of October 1, 2014.

- Ethnicity:
  - 13% Asian
  - 3% Black
  - 24% Hispanic or Latino
  - 1% Native American/Alaska Native
  - 1% Native Hawaiian/Pacific Islander
  - 52% White
  - 7% Other (includes students identifying with more than one of the categories above or students not identifying with any of the categories above)
- Number of primary languages spoken in students' homes: 94
- Percentage of students qualifying for free and reduced lunch: 36.6%
- Percentage of students qualifying for special education services: 12.1%
- Percentage of Talented and Gifted students: 13.5%
- Percentage of ESL students: 13.3%
- Percentage of male students: 51%
- Percentage of female students: 49%
- High school dropout rate: 2.7% as of 2013–14, lower than Oregon's average of 3.9%
- Graduation rate: 79.7%, higher than Oregon's average of 72%
- Number of staff:
  - Teachers: 2,330
  - Classified employees: 1,710
  - School administration: 92
  - District administration: 30
  - Total number: 4,162
- Teachers with a master's degree or higher: 87%
- Average years teaching experience: 14.6
- Salary range: $39,100 - $80,253

== See also ==
- List of school districts in Oregon
