= Terra Nova High School (Portland, Oregon) =

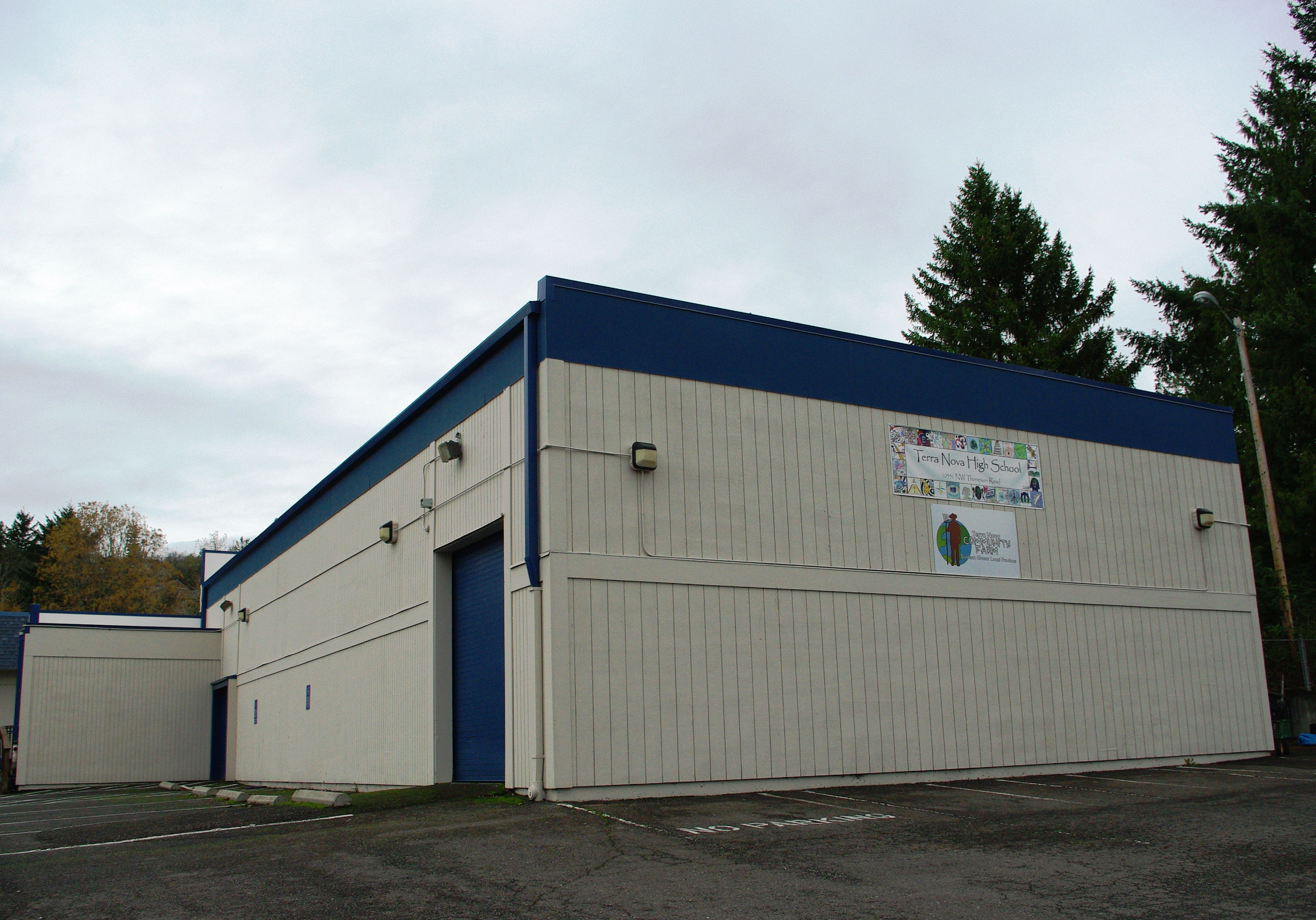

Location
- 10351 NW Thompson Road; Portland, (Multnomah County), Oregon 97229; United States; 45.545458°N 122.783294°W

Information
- Type: Public contract
- Opened: 2005
- Founder: Gary Myers
- School district: Beaverton
- Principal: Michael Crandall
- Grades: 11-12
- Enrollment: 120
- Campus: Suburban
- Website: www.terranovabsd.org

Terra Nova High School is a high school in Portland, Oregon, United States. It is part of the Beaverton School District (BSD). The school district reopened Terra Nova, after two years empty, for the 2014–2015 school year.

== History ==
Terra Nova's building is the of the previous Bonny Slope School (not to be confused with the unrelated current Bonny Slope Elementary School), built at an unknown time between 1910 and 1940.

Terra Nova grew out of the spirit of two programs previously offered by the Northwest Regional Education Service District: the Cascade Education Corps and the Outdoor Leadership Program. These outdoor, environmental education programs gave students training and hands-on experience in leadership, teaching, and environmental issues. This real world learning provided students with an opportunity to develop personal, team building and problem solving skills.

The school's enrollment peaked in the high 70s before it began to downsize as budget cuts were made. In 2010 the Northwest Regional Education Service District announced that they would not continue to provide funding for Terra Nova High School. After much turmoil and many meetings with parents, Beaverton School District decided to fully adopt the school as one of their own. The district replaced the principal and founder Gary Myers with a part-time administrator in order to cut costs. As budget cuts continued, the school eventually was left with two staff members for four school grades. In January 2012 the Beaverton School District announced it would close the school.

In 2014 the district announced it would reopen the school for the 2014–2015 school year.

In the first year, the school operated with one cohort of about 70 students. This number doubled for the 2015–2016 school year, with two separate cohorts attending on alternating days.

The school now has two different classes; Field Biology/Sustainable Foods and Applied Chemistry/Sustainable Foods. Sophomores, Juniors, and seniors from each of the district's six comprehensive high schools are bused to the Terra Nova site for half a day every other day for either class. Each class (two periods; either morning or afternoon) has approximately 60 students. Terra Nova has 3 teachers (for Field Bio and Applied Chem.), a farmer (who doubles as a teacher), a program coordinator, and an administrator.

== Terra Nova Community Farm ==
The school had a community supported agriculture program, operating a farm on the school grounds.
