= Metro League =

The Metro League is a high school conference on the west side of the Portland metropolitan area of Oregon that is a member of the OSAA. It is under classification 6A of the OSAA, and it contains six Beaverton high schools and one catholic private school.

== Members ==
School	Enrollment	Mascot	
Aloha High School	1794	Warriors	1968
Beaverton High School	1654	Beavers	1902
Jesuit High School^{1}	1294	Crusaders	1956
Mountainside High School	1453	Mavericks	2017
Southridge High School	1614	Skyhawks	1999
Sunset High School	2123	Apollos	1959
Westview High School	2508	Wildcats	1994

^1 Jesuit High School is part of the Archdiocese of Portland.

== History ==
The Metro League used to have ten high schools including the ones in Hillsboro (Century High School, Glencoe High School, Hillsboro High School, and Liberty High School). It used to be part of classification 4A until the school year 2006–2007 when it was promoted up to 6A. With that, Hillsboro High School was separated from the Metro League and joined the Northwest Oregon Conference, which is under the 5A classification.
