= Westview High School (Portland, Oregon) =

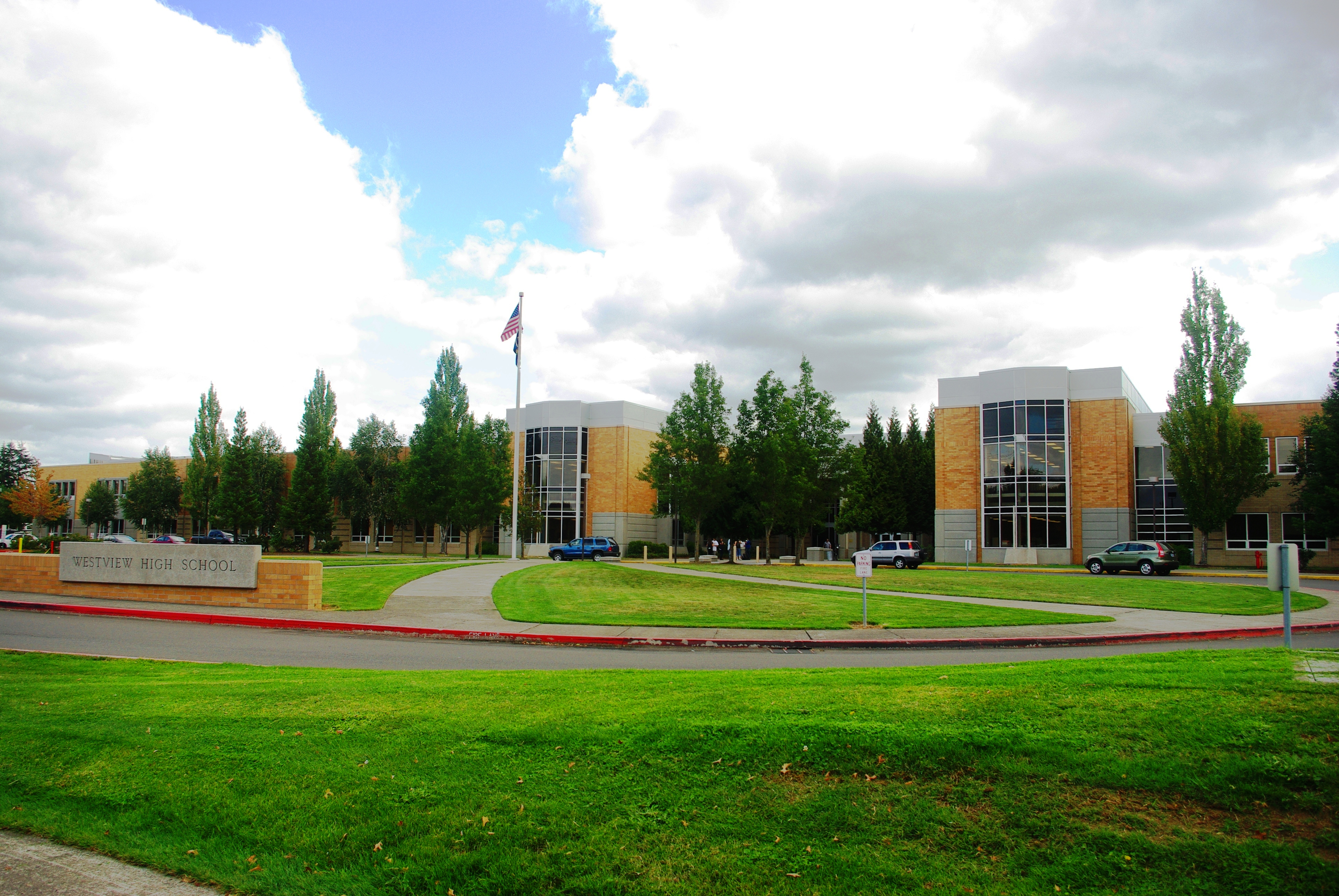

Location
- 4200 NW 185th Avenue, Portland, Oregon 97229; United States; 45°33′0″N 122°51′54″W

Information
- Type: Public
- Opened: 1994
- School district: Beaverton School District
- Principal: Matthew Pedersen
- Teaching staff: 106.77 (FTE)
- Grades: 9–12
- Enrollment: 2,413 (2023-2024)
- Student to teacher ratio: 22.60
- Campus: Suburban
- Colors: Navy, red, and silver
- Nickname: Wildcats
- Rival: Sunset High School
- Newspaper: The View
- Feeder schools: Five Oaks Middle School, Stoller Middle School
- Website: westview.beaverton.k12.or.us

Westview High School (WHS) is a public high school in an unincorporated area of the Portland metropolitan area. It is the largest high school in the Beaverton School District and the third largest high school in the state.

== Academics ==
In 2014, the average SAT score among Westview students was 1708, compared to the Oregon state average of 1544. However, this SAT score was before the SAT scores changed to a max of 1600 The average ACT score among 552 students at Westview was 22.4, compared to the 21.4 state average.

Of the class of 2014, which consisted of 571 students, 65% attended a four-year college, while 15% attended a two-year college.

== Extracurricular activities ==
In the 2021–22 school year, 66% of students reported being involved in at least one extracurricular activity.

=== Academic competitions ===
Westview is home to several competitive academic teams, namely Science Bowl, History Bowl, and Speech and Debate. The former group has earned two straight regional championships in 2016 and 2017 in the Bonneville Power Administration Regional Science Bowl, the largest tournament of its kind in the nation. Westview's Science Bowl team has appeared at the national competition for National Science Bowl in four consecutive years, placing second in their division at the national competition in 2017.

Westview's History Bowl program has also placed on the national level on multiple occasions. The team has twice been the national champion of History Bowl, in 2014 and again in 2017.

Individual Westview students have also had success in science fairs with many students both qualifying to and winning awards at the International Science and Engineering Fair, Regeneron ISEF (formerly Intel ISEF).

== Athletics ==
Westview High School athletic teams compete in the OSAA 6A-2 Metro League along with other high schools in the Portland Metro area.

=== State championships ===
- Baseball: 2011, 2018
- Band: 2000†, 2001, 2002
- Boys Soccer: 2011, 2017
- Boys Swimming: 2009
- Boys Tennis: 2002
- Cheerleading: 2005, 2007, 2008, 2009, 2011, 2012, 2017, 2018, 2019, 2020, 2021, 2022, 2023, 2024
- Girls Basketball: 2000
- Girls Golf: 2017
- Girls Swimming: 2005, 2006, 2007, 2008, 2022
- Girls Tennis: 2022
- Softball: 2004
- Speech: 2006, 2007, 2012, 2019

(†=Tied with one or more schools)

== Notable alumni ==
- Kara Braxton, WNBA basketball player
- Darrius Clemons, college football wide receiver
- Trevor Crowe, former MLB baseball player
- Erik Hurtado, MLS soccer player
- Garrett Jackson, NBA basketball coach
- Ian Karmel, stand-up comedian and writer
- Carson Kelly, MLB baseball player
- Dallin Leavitt, NFL football player (transferred to Central Catholic)
- Sam Leavitt, college football player (transferred to West Linn)
- Landen Lucas – APOEL basketball player
- Jaime Nared, WNBA basketball player
- Brandon Pili, NFL football player
- Whitney Ping, table tennis player, 2004 Olympian
- Zoey Tang, chess player
- Samori Toure, NFL football player
