= J.J. Hones =

American basketball player (born 1987)

JJ Hones
Personal information
- Born: October 10, 1987 (age 39) La Jolla, California, United States
- Height: 5 ft 10 in (1.78 m)

Sport
- Country: USA
- Sport: Women's basketball
- College team: Stanford Cardinal

JJ Hones (born December 10, 1987) is a former Stanford Cardinal women's basketball player.

Born in La Jolla, California, Hones is the daughter of Susan and Dan Hones and now resides in Beaverton, Oregon. Her younger sister, Kelsey plays soccer for the Oregon Ducks.

Hones won two state titles in basketball for Southridge High School in Beaverton, OR.
