= Get 'Em =

2016 video game

- Developer: Legendary Rejects
- Publisher: Legendary Rejects
- Producer: Behdad Sami
- Designer: Behdad Sami
- Programmers: Kyle Stockton; Nicholas Waddell
- Artist: SuperGenius Studios
- Composer: Behdad Sami
- Engine: Unity
- Platforms: iOS, Android
- Release: iOS: WW: June 14, 2016; Android: WW: October 16, 2016
- Genre: Open world
- Mode: Single-player

Get 'Em is an open world video game released in the App Store on June 14, 2016. It was developed and published by Legendary Rejects. The game stars superhero crime fighting dogs, who are on a mission to track down the city's most ruthless gangster, save their dognapped friend, and make it onto the police K9 unit.

== Gameplay ==
After Leila, a helpless Yorkie is dognapped, three best friends come together to find out what happened. You can start the game by picking one of three characters. As you accomplish more missions and get closer to tracking down the city's mob boss, you meet and unlock more dogs along the way. Not only can you play as many different dogs, but you can customize each dogs outfit, and enhance their powers. Get 'Em features many different styles of gameplay from first person, guitarhero-style, third person, infinite runner, top-down, and open world.

=== Characters ===
Get 'Em has eight main characters and three bonus characters to play as.

=== Bones ===
Bones are a currency obtained in-game during gameplay, watching advertisements, completing main and sub-missions, finding a free gift hidden throughout the city, and using legal currency to buy them in various amounts. Bones are counted in the top middle of the screen. Various amounts of bones can be used to buy new characters, new accessories, refill life and turbo meters, or to enhance each characters superpowers.

== Development ==
While recovering from injuries occurred during his professional basketball career in the 2010/2011 season, Behdad Sami decided to pursue his dream of creating a video game. Legendary Rejects’ first game, Get 'Em officially started production in 2011. It was planned to take a total of 6 months to produce, but due to numerous unfortunate setbacks, production took an extra 5 years. Get 'Em was finally released in summer of 2016 for the iOS platform and fall of 2016 for Android. Get 'Em was inspired by the open world free-roaming games Grand Theft Auto and Need For Speed Underground. The name comes from the term most dog owners use to tell their dog to fetch or "get" something. The concept of the game was to bring crime-fighting dogs into the spotlight, instead of being in a sidekick role. Behdad wanted users to play as superhero vigilante dogs in an open world environment, to give the users a sense of freedom as a dog in a big city. The art style created by SuperGenius Studios was designed to look like a cel-shaded 3D cartoon or comic book playable video game.

== Legacy ==
On October 19, 2017, the first Get 'Em children's graphic novel, based on the Get 'Em video game, was released on Apple Books.

Get 'Em Graphic Novel
- Author: Behdad Sami
- Illustrator: SuperGenius
- Language: English
- Genre: Graphic novel
- Publisher: Behdad Sami
- Publication date: October 19, 2017
- Media type: iBooks

On June 21, 2018, Legendary Rejects released the Get 'Em iMessage stickers app. The stickers app has artwork from the actual video game and graphic novel iBook.
