= International School of Beaverton =

Location
- 17770 SW Blanton Street; Aloha, (Washington County), Oregon 97007; United States; 45.490278°N 122.860833°W

Information
- Type: Public secondary
- Established: 2006
- School district: Beaverton School District
- Principal: Andrew Gilford
- Faculty: 40.18 (FTE)
- Grades: 6-12
- Enrollment: 847 (2019-20)
- Student to teacher ratio: 21.18
- Colors: Red and Black
- Mascot: Dragon
- Website: https://isb.beaverton.k12.or.us
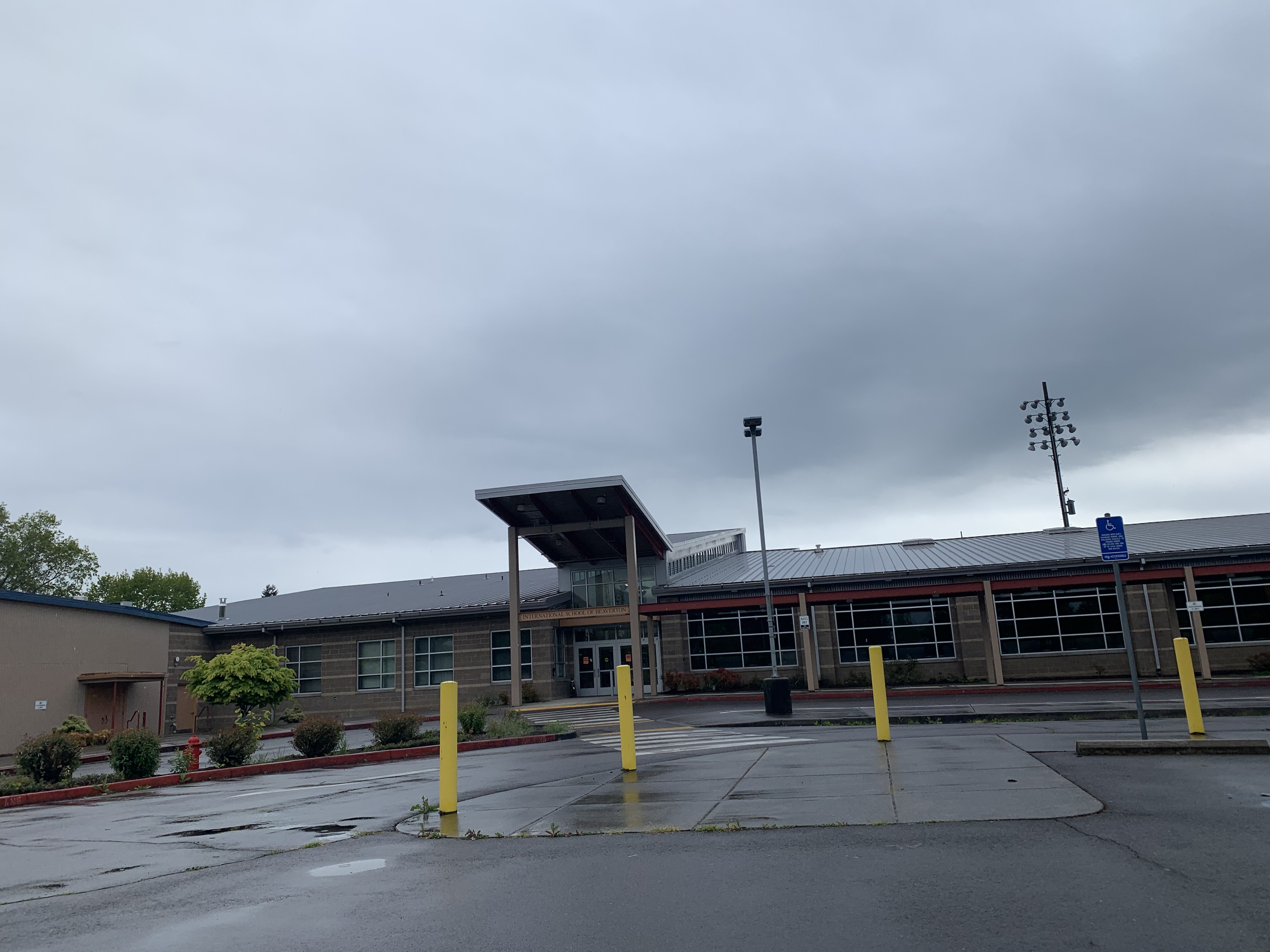

The International School of Beaverton (ISB) is an option school that serves grades 6-12 in the Beaverton School District. It is the only school in the district to be a full International Baccalaureate (IB) school, where all students take IB courses and complete additional work for the Middle Years Programme (MYP) and the Diploma Programme (DP), including the personal project and the extended essay. In 2012 and various other years, U.S. News & World Report ranked the school as the best public high school in the state, and 20th in the nation. The current principal is Andrew Gilford and the assistant principal is Kelly Bordwell.

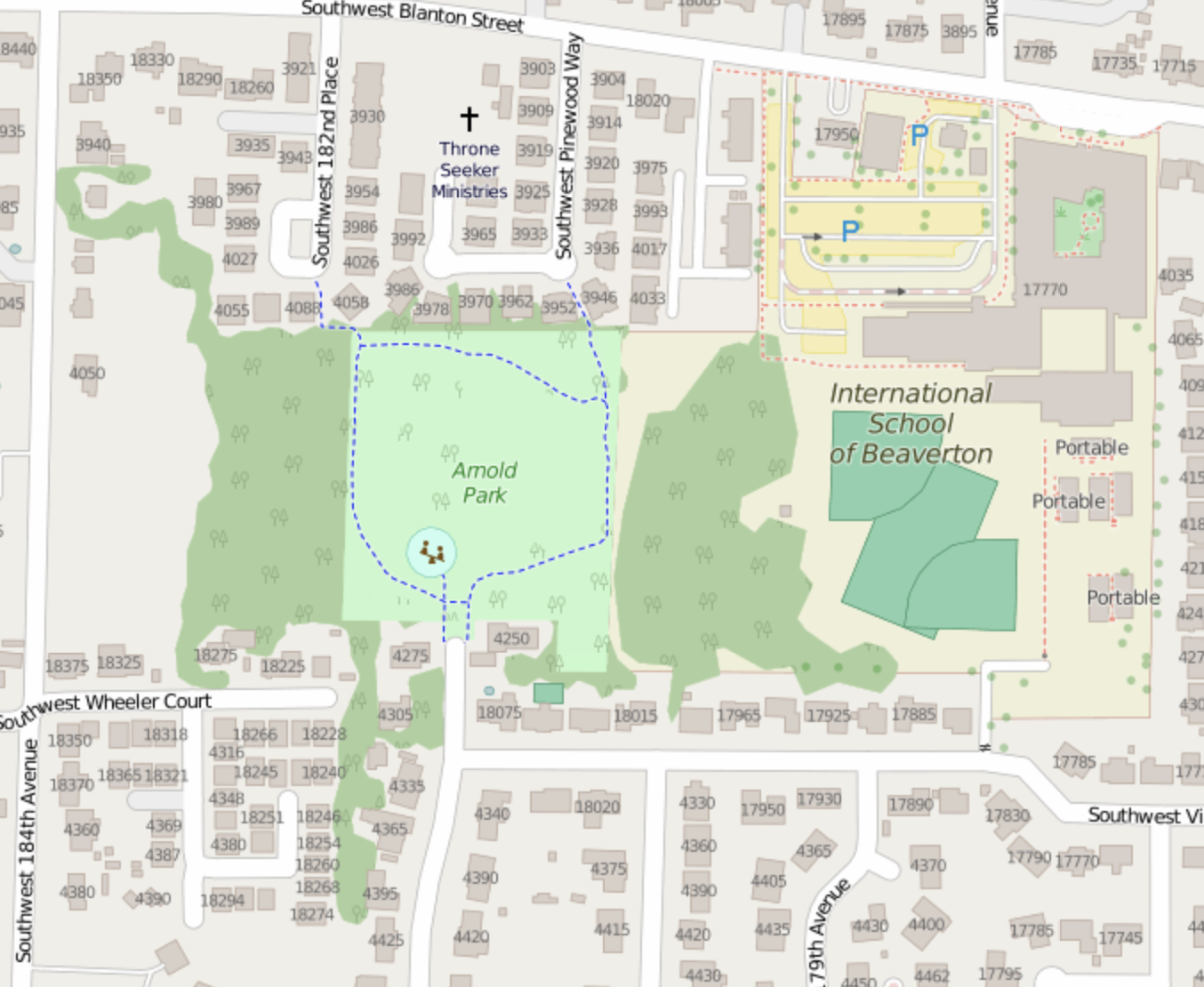
Map of ISB

== History ==
The International School of Beaverton began in 2006 as a grades 6-10 grade MYP school, in the former building of Aloha-Huber Elementary School. By 2009, the school became a 6-12 grade school, adding the DP.

== Academics ==
The school offers various courses in the areas of English, math, science, and social studies, as well as electives such as band, art, and choir. ISB also offers language courses, including Spanish, Japanese, and Mandarin.

Students in sixth grade are placed in regular classes, but they have the option to choose whether to take the Band elective for the whole year, or to take Choir and Art each for a semester. Students may also try out two of the three language courses offered at ISB for a semester each, and they may choose which they wish to take for the rest of their time at ISB. Native Speakers of a language or those with prior experience may enroll in a language course one level maximum higher than their peers (such as Spanish 4 instead of 3 in 9th grade), however, it is recommended that students take a course in a language they do not speak. Students may also take Spanish and Japanese AB in 11th and 12th grade.

In 6th grade, students are either placed in math 6/7, or math 6/7/8. In math 6/7/8, if students achieve a grade of at least a 6(A) in criterion A, and 5(B) in criterion B-D, they make take AGS 1-3 in 7-9th grade, precalculus in 10th grade, and IB Math HL in 11th and 12th grade. Students in math 6/7 will then take math 7/8, and should they receive a score of at least 5(B) in criterion A and 4(C) in Criterion B-D, they will take AGS 1-3 in 8-10th grade and take IB Math SL in 11th and 12th grade. Should they not receive a satisfactory score, they will take Math 8 in 8th grade, and take AGS 1-2 in 9 and 10th grade, and take IB Math studies for 11th and 12th grade.

== International Baccalaureate programs at ISB ==
At ISB, all students are full IB students, unless changes must be made to support graduation. For 6-10th grade, all students take the middle years programme (MYP), where all students are enrolled in MYP courses and all students must do the personal project in 10th grade. Following successful completion of the personal project, completion of the required community service hours, and satisfactory scores in all subjects, students will be awarded the MYP certificate. In 11th and 12th grade, all students take the diploma programme (DP), and all students are required to take English A HL, Biology HL, and History HL. Students may have additional classes required, depending on their HL and SL choices, such as Extended English, Extended Bio, Extended History, and Extended Math. (Specific to 11th grade.) Also, all students are required to write the extended essay, take a theory of knowledge (TOK) class, and fulfill creativity, activity, service (CAS) requirements. If a students completes those, and receives a satisfactory score on all courses and exams, they will be awarded the IB Diploma. Around 70% of students at ISB who try for the diploma are successful, generally most of the graduating class is able to achieve the full IB diploma, that 30% is usually the student's choice.

== Demographics ==
For the 2014-2015 school year, there were 480 students enrolled in the middle school and 389 in the high school. In the middle school, 0.2% of students were Native American, 27.2% Asian or Pacific Islander, 1.6% Black, 12.9% Hispanic, 48.7% White, and 9.1% other. In the high school, 0% of students were Native American, 23.9% Asian or Pacific Islander, 1.5% Black, 18.7% Hispanic, 41.3% White, and 14.3% other.
