= Southridge High School (Oregon) =

Public high school in Beaverton, Oregon

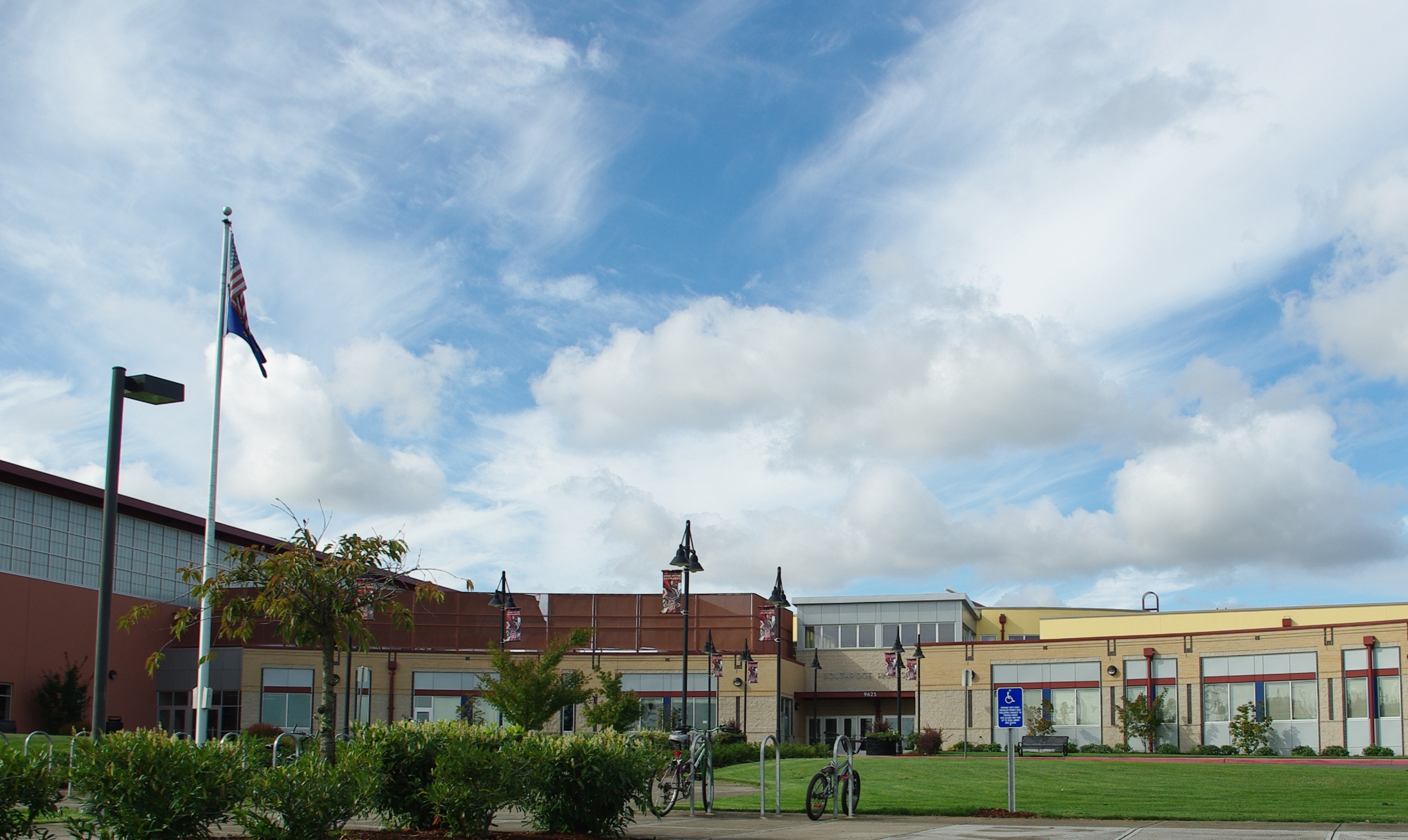

Location
- 9625 SW 125th Avenue; Beaverton, Oregon 97008; United States; 45°27′00″N 122°48′24″W

Information
- Type: Public
- Opened: 1999
- School district: Beaverton School District
- Principal: Maria Copelan
- Teaching staff: 81.37 (on an FTE basis)
- Grades: 9–12
- Enrollment: 1,450 (2023–24)
- Student to teacher ratio: 17.82
- Campus type: Suburban
- Colors: Cardinal red, Vegas gold, and black
- Athletics conference: OSAA Metro League 6A-2
- Nickname: Skyhawks
- Rival: Mountainside High School
- Feeder schools: Conestoga Middle School, Highland Park Middle School, Whitford Middle School
- Website: Southridge High School

Southridge High School (SRHS) is a public high school in Beaverton, Oregon, United States. The school's boundary serves southern Beaverton, and a small portion of Portland and Tigard.

== History ==
Southridge opened in 1999 due to overcrowding at other high schools in the Beaverton SD. SRHS was constructed with the help of a $146 million bond approved in 1996. Southridge opened to grades 9–11 with an initial enrollment of 1,236. 12th grade was added the following year. Southridge's first principal was Sarah Boly.

The school offers International Baccalaureate programs and a large number of Advanced Placement courses.

== Athletics ==
=== State championships ===
- Baseball: 2002
- Softball: 2005
- Women's basketball: 2005, 2006, 2007, 2008, 2010, 2017, 2018
- Football: 2008
- Women's track and field: 2009
- Men's water polo: 2011, 2012,2013
- Dance team: 2015
- Volleyball: 2017

== Notable alumni ==
- Darwin Barney, baseball player
- Chad Barrett, soccer player
- Cameron Brink, basketball player (transferred after junior year)
- Jace Fry, baseball player
- J.J. Hones, basketball player
- Jeron Mastrud, NFL tight end
- Behdad Sami, basketball player
