= Behdad Sami =

Iranian–American basketball player (born 1986)

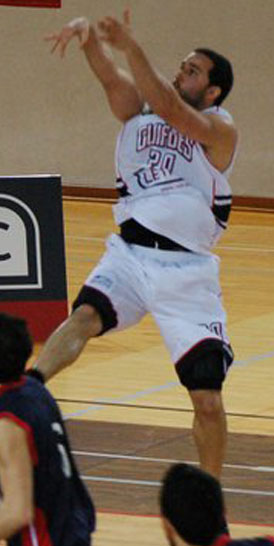
- Behdad Sami

No. 20 – Free Agent
- Position: Point guard

Personal information
- Born: June 20, 1986 (age 40) Iran
- Listed height: 6 ft 0 in (1.83 m)
- Listed weight: 200 lb (91 kg)

Career information
- High school: Southridge High School
- College: Linn-Benton Community College
- Playing career: 2007–2014

Career history
- 2007: Georgia Gwizzlies
- 2008: Kaveh Tehran
- 2009: Al Wakrah
- 2010: San Diego Surf
- 2011: Guifoes Sports Club

Career highlights
- First Pro Iranian Player in USA History; First Pro Iranian Player in Portugal History; (3x) Best Defensive Player; ABA Dunk Contest Nominee (2007); ABA All Star Game Nominee (2007); Most Inspirational Player

Behdad Sami (born June 20, 1986) is an Iranian American professional basketball player. Behdad is the world's first Iranian basketball player to play professionally at any level in the United States when he played in the minor-league American Basketball Association in 2007. In October 2010, he became the first Iranian to play pro basketball in Portugal.

== High School and College ==
Behdad graduated from Southridge High School in 2005. Prior to graduating from Southridge, Sami attended Lake Oswego High School for two years, but due to complications between him and the varsity head coach, he later decided to transfer. Sami's transfer was a result of one specific incident, where the varsity head coach referred to him as "Osama bin Laden" during practice. Upon graduating, Behdad received a full ride athletic scholarship to Linn-Benton Community College in Albany, Oregon where he played one season in the Northwest Athletic Association of Community Colleges (NWAACC) prior to turning pro.

== Professional career ==
Behdad started his professional career playing point guard for the Georgia Gwizzlies in the American Basketball Association (ABA) & also professionally overseas. Standing at six feet with only a 7-foot 4 vertical arm reach, his dunking vertical leap is measured at 46" and has a 40-yard dash time of 4.469 seconds. In SAQ (speed, agility, quickness) tests done in December 2008, he managed to touch a 10-foot 9-inch mark on a concrete surfaced facility. Sami has played in many different countries and different leagues around the world, including major-league professional teams in Iran and Qatar. Behdad started the 2010 season with the San Diego Surf (ABA) but within the first month of the season was signed to play with the Guifoes Sport Club in Portugal's ProLiga. Following his season in Portugal, Sami received results indicating he had played his season in Portugal on a broken shin. Due to this injury, he has been forced to sit out the entire 2011–2013 season, and undergo rigorous physical therapy.

== Gatorade - Quest for G; The series ==
In spring of 2009, Behdad was hand-picked from thousands of top athletes around the world to be a part of Gatorade "Quest for G; The Series". This was a reality show about training athletes, and turning them into Olympic ready athletes for their specific individual sport. Although Sami was selected for his accomplishments and athletic ability in basketball, due to the concept of individual sports, Sami, with the approval of Gatorade decided to attempt their trials for tennis because of his strong background in that sport.

== Off The Court ==
=== Personal life ===
Behdad was an actor in the film production of The Winner, which released Winter of 2012. In May 2011, Sami posed for the NOH8 photo campaign, showing his support to the silenced men and women around the world. Behdad was co-owner and co-founder of KTJB Presents production company. In May 2012, KTJB released its first stop-animation official music video for rapper David Banner, which featured singer Chris Brown. In 2019, Behdad starred in the film Trunkful, which was also accepted into the Miami Urban Film Festival.

=== Legendary Rejects ===
In 2014, he founded Legendary Rejects which focuses on video games, apps, and entertainment. Get 'Em was the first video game title he created and released in 2016 for the Apple iOS and Android platforms. Behdad wrote, produced, and directed Get 'Em, as well as created the music and was a voice actor in the game. On October 19, 2017, Behdad wrote, designed, and published the Get 'Em children's graphic novel, on iBooks. On June 21, 2018, Behdad Sami Interactive released the Get 'Em iMessage stickers app. The stickers' app has artwork from the actual video game and graphic novel iBook. In addition the Get ‘Em franchise and spin-off games, Legendary Rejects also released a movie streaming app in 2023.

=== Sponsors ===
In February 2011, Behdad received his first sponsorship deal from Kallusive Clothing (which no longer exists). Behdad was also endorsed by O.N.E Coconut Water, which started their sponsorship in August 2011. He was an ambassador of the "Liquid Revolution" which promotes and encourages people to live a healthy lifestyle.
