= Aloha High School =

Location
- 18550 SW Kinnaman Road; Aloha, Oregon 97078; United States; 45°29′05″N 122°52′08″W

Information
- Type: Public
- Established: 1968; 58 years ago
- School district: Beaverton School District
- Principal: Matt Casteel
- Teaching staff: 91.58 (FTE)
- Grades: 9-12
- Enrollment: 1,633 (2023-2024)
- Student to teacher ratio: 17.83
- Campus: Suburban
- Colors: Blue, gold, and green
- Athletics conference: OSAA Metro League 6A-2
- Nickname: Warriors
- Team name: Aloha Warriors
- Rival: Beaverton High School
- Feeder schools: Meadow Park Middle School, Mountain View Middle School
- Website: Aloha High School

Aloha High School (AHS) is a suburban public high school in Aloha, Oregon, United States. It is part of the Beaverton School District.

== History ==
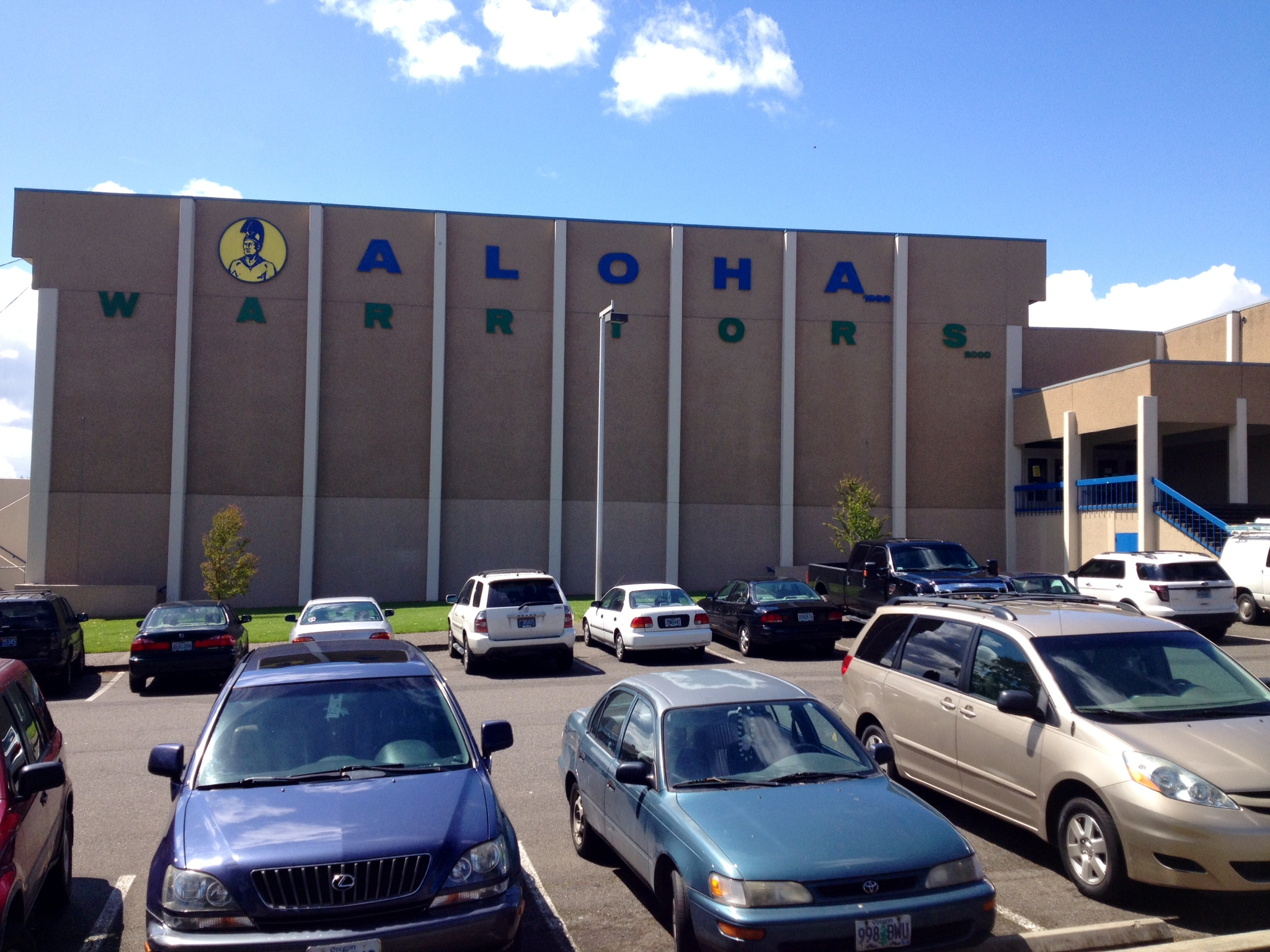
Aloha High School

In the 1950s, the Beaverton area had separate high school and elementary school districts. The high school district served Beaverton High School and Sunset High School. There were also twelve elementary school districts. In 1960, the thirteen districts were unified after a vote of the people.

The Beaverton area was one of the fastest growing in the state, and in 1962, the district determined that a new high school was needed. The former Kinnaman Dairy Farm was purchased, and in 1966, construction began on a new building. There were construction delays, so in September 1968, the first Aloha High School tenth and eleventh grade students used the former Merle Davies Elementary School and parts of Beaverton High School. The Aloha High School building, though incomplete, held its first classes in 1970.

=== School crest ===
The community of Aloha (pronounced Ah-LO-wa) was likely named for a place in the state of Wisconsin, and not for the Hawaiian word aloha. The association with Hawaii, however, gives the school its mascot, a Hawaiian warrior, and the design of the school crest, which includes a warrior and a conch shell, a symbol associated with Hawaii. The crest was designed by students during the 1968–69 and 1969–1970 school years.

== Demographics ==
As of the 2024–2025 school year, the school was 1% American Indian/Alaskan Native, 7% Asian, 6% Black, 36% Hispanic, 44% White, and 6% other race. Approximately 62% of students qualified for free or reduced lunch.

== Athletics and activities ==
School activities sanctioned by the Oregon School Activities Association include football, volleyball, soccer, cross country, basketball, swimming, wrestling, dance/drill, cheerleading, baseball, softball, track and field, tennis, golf, band, choir, solo music, and speech.

=== State championships ===
- Football: 2010
- Boys' track and field: 1978, 2012
- Boys' golf: 1977
- Cheerleading, 4A Coed: 1997; 6A/5A Large: 2013,2014; 6A Large: 2016
- Girls' cross country: AAA, 1980, 1981, 1983
- Band, 4A: 1992

== Notable alumni ==
- Wally Backman (Class of 1977), baseball player, member of Oregon Sports Hall of Fame
- Brandon Eisert (Class of 2016), baseball pitcher, currently with the Pittsburgh Pirates
- Brad Fitzpatrick (Class of 1998), founder of LiveJournal
- Eric Gunderson, former baseball player
- Jen-Hsun "Jensen" Huang (Class of 1979), co-founder and former CEO of Nvidia
- Brian Joelson, former tennis player
- Greg McMackin, former head football coach at Hawaii from 1968 to 1972
- Thomas Tyner, (Class of 2013), former football player at the University of Oregon
- Joe Wolfinger, basketball player
