= Beaverton High School =

- The new building that opened in 2026

Location
- 13000 SW 2nd Street; Beaverton, Oregon 97005; United States; 45°29′10″N 122°48′39″W

Information
- Type: Public
- Established: 1902
- School district: Beaverton School District
- Principal: Andrew Kearl
- Teaching staff: 87.46 (FTE)
- Grades: 9–12
- Enrollment: 1,476 (2023-2024)
- Student to teacher ratio: 16.88
- Campus: Suburban
- Colors: Orange and black
- Athletics conference: OSAA Metro League
- Team name: Beavers
- Rival: Aloha High School
- Feeder schools: Cedar Park Middle School, Meadow Park Middle School, Whitford Middle School
- Website: Beaverton High School

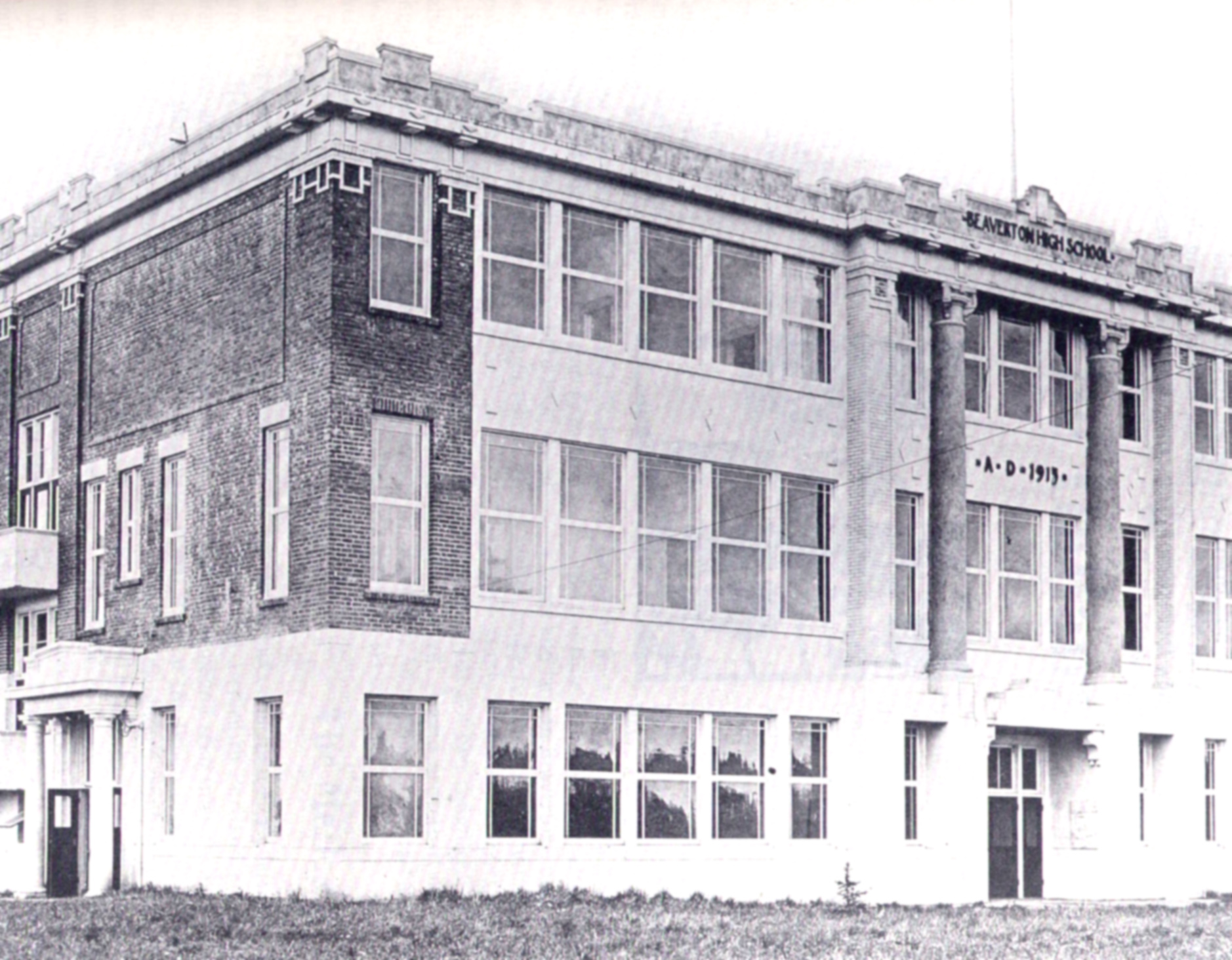
The original school building, 1915. It stood until 2024.

Beaverton High School (BHS) is a public high school located in Beaverton, Oregon, United States. It is the oldest high school in Beaverton and is believed to be the oldest public high school in the state of Oregon that is in its original location and building. Beaverton High School contains grades 9–12. A new main building was constructed in 2024–2026, to replace the existing building, and opened at the beginning of the 2026–2027 school year.

In addition to sections of Beaverton, the school's enrollment boundaries include portions of West Haven-Sylvan.

== History ==
In 1875, the original schoolhouse opened on land between Canyon Road and Broadway Street. It was called Beaverton Public School. A ninth grade class was added in 1902, followed by a 10th grade class in 1910.

A $21,000 bond (equivalent of $660,504 today) was passed in 1915 to build a 21-room school to be a dedicated high school. The building was dedicated in 1916. In 1937, the Works Progress Administration constructed a new school just to the south, to replace the aging Beaverton Public School building, which was then turned into an elementary school, Beaverton Grade School. It was renamed again to Merle Davies Elementary School in 1948, honoring a long-time teacher turned principal. In 1983, due to more elementary schools being built in the area and overcrowding at BHS, the elementary school was closed and its building was made part of the high school again, to provide additional classroom space. It was closed from 2006 to 2010 because of concerns over its ability to withstand an earthquake, which led to its being seismically upgraded. Until its demolition in 2024, the 1916 building was considered to be the oldest public high school in Oregon that was in its original building, although the building had served as an elementary school – and not part of the high school – from 1937 to 1983.

Two fires have occurred at the school. The first was during the spring break of 1979, when a faulty light bulb sparked a massive fire that burned down the entire auditorium. It took the effort of multiple fire departments to put it out. The drama department continued with work on their production of Oklahoma! and put on the show at Aloha High School's auditorium. A second, smaller fire occurred in 2020 after a refrigerator failure in the kitchen. Semi-permanent damage occurred across the entire building, which was already aging.

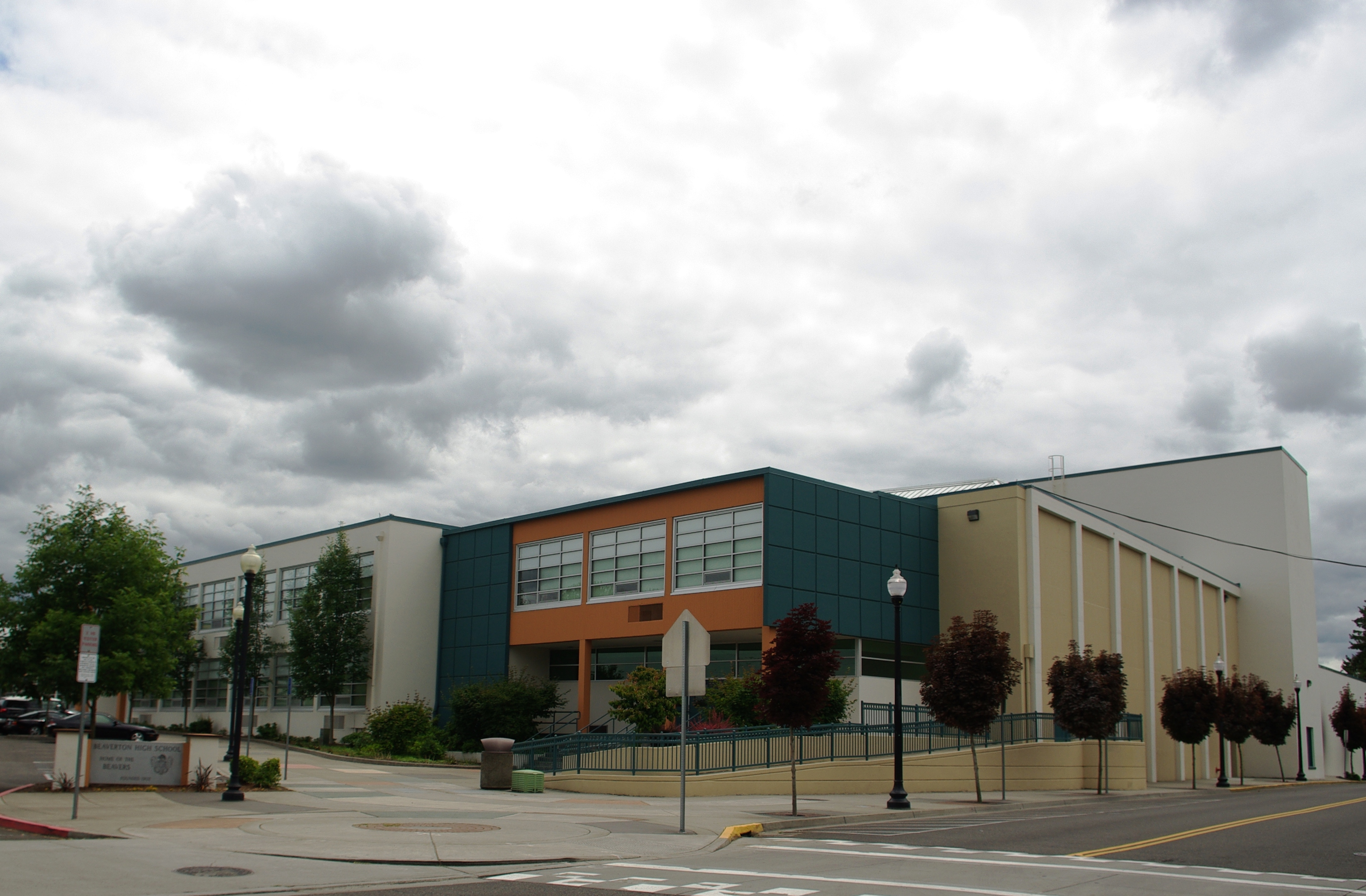
The main building in 2009. It is in the process of being demolished in fall 2026.

The new building that opened in 2026, immediately to the north of the old one

In 2022, voters passed a large-scale $723 million bond measure including funds to rebuild Beaverton High School. Construction was due to begin in summer 2024. To make way for the new building, the school's 1916 building, which had been an elementary school from about 1937 to 1983 (named Merle Davies Elementary in 1948) and then part of the high school again, was torn down in early 2024.

Because there was no viable swing school, it was planned that students would attend school on site during construction. The school's three-story, 290,000-square-foot (27,000 m^{2}) new main building opened to students on August 25, 2026, at the beginning of the 2026–2027 school year. Demolition of the old building began soon afterward, initially with the interior, and it will be replaced with a parking lot.

== Academics ==
In 1985, Beaverton High School was honored in the Blue Ribbon Schools Program, the highest honor a school can receive in the United States.

In 2008, 75% of the school's seniors received a high school diploma. Of 521 students, 390 graduated, 99 dropped out, five received a modified diploma, and 27 were still in high school in 2009.

The school has a wide variety of athletic programs and competes in the 6A-2 Metro League of the Oregon School Activities Association. It also hosts club sports like lacrosse, racquetball, ski team, snowboarding team, Dragon Boat, and Multicultural Soccer. Along with this, the band, choir, and drama clubs all compete in OSAA sanctioned competitions.

The school also has several student-organized and teacher-supervised clubs, ranging from many different subjects. Just a few examples of this many groups include MEChA, HOSA, Sewing Club, REAP, Ballet Folklorico, MUN, Gender-Sexuality Alliance (GSA), Key Club, Dungeons & Dragons Club, International Thespian Society (Drama Club), National Honor Society (NHS), National Art Honor Society (NAHS), Fishing Club, and Eco Club. There are also competitive academic teams like Speech, Debate, and an FRC robotics team.

== Notable alumni ==
- Anomie Belle (1998) - musician and artivist
- Shoshana Bean (1995) - recording artist and Tony award winning actress
- John Brotherton (1998) - actor
- Mike Byrne (2008) - drummer, member of the Grammy-Award winning band The Smashing Pumpkins
- Ben Crane (1994) - four-time PGA Tour tournament champion
- Ryan Deckert (1989) - formerly represented District 8 in the Oregon House of Representatives
- James FitzPatrick (1982) - professional football player
- Jamey Harris (1989) - National Champion 1998 U.S. Track & Field, men's 1500 meters
- Collin Hegna (1996) - musician for The Brian Jonestown Massacre
- Dorothy Johnson (1955) - film actress
- Steve Lyons (1978) - former Major League Baseball player and current announcer for the Boston Red Sox
- Angus MacLane (1993) - former animator of Pixar Animation Studios, the co-director of Finding Dory and the director of Lightyear
- Anthony Newman (1984) - NFL safety
- Meredith Phillips (1991) - television personality/contestant on ABC reality television series The Bachelorette
- Jordan Railey (2010) - basketball player
- Jordan Senn (2003) - professional football player for the Carolina Panthers in the National Football League
- Ari Shapiro (1996) - singer, performer, and former radio journalist for NPR
- Scott Shleifer (1995) - billionaire hedge fund manager
- Todd Snider (1985) - singer-songwriter
- Anthony Taylor (1984) - basketball player
- Mac Wilkins (1968) - gold medalist in the 1976 Summer Olympics in the discus throw; silver medalist in the 1984 Summer Olympics in the discus throw.
- Elsie Windes (2003) - gold medalist in the 2012 Summer Olympics for women's water polo; silver medalist in the 2008 Summer Olympics for women's water polo
- Carolyn Wood (1963) - gold medalist in the 1960 Summer Olympics in the 4 x 100 freestyle relay.
