= Patricia Reser Center for the Arts =

Arts center in Beaverton, Oregon, U.S.

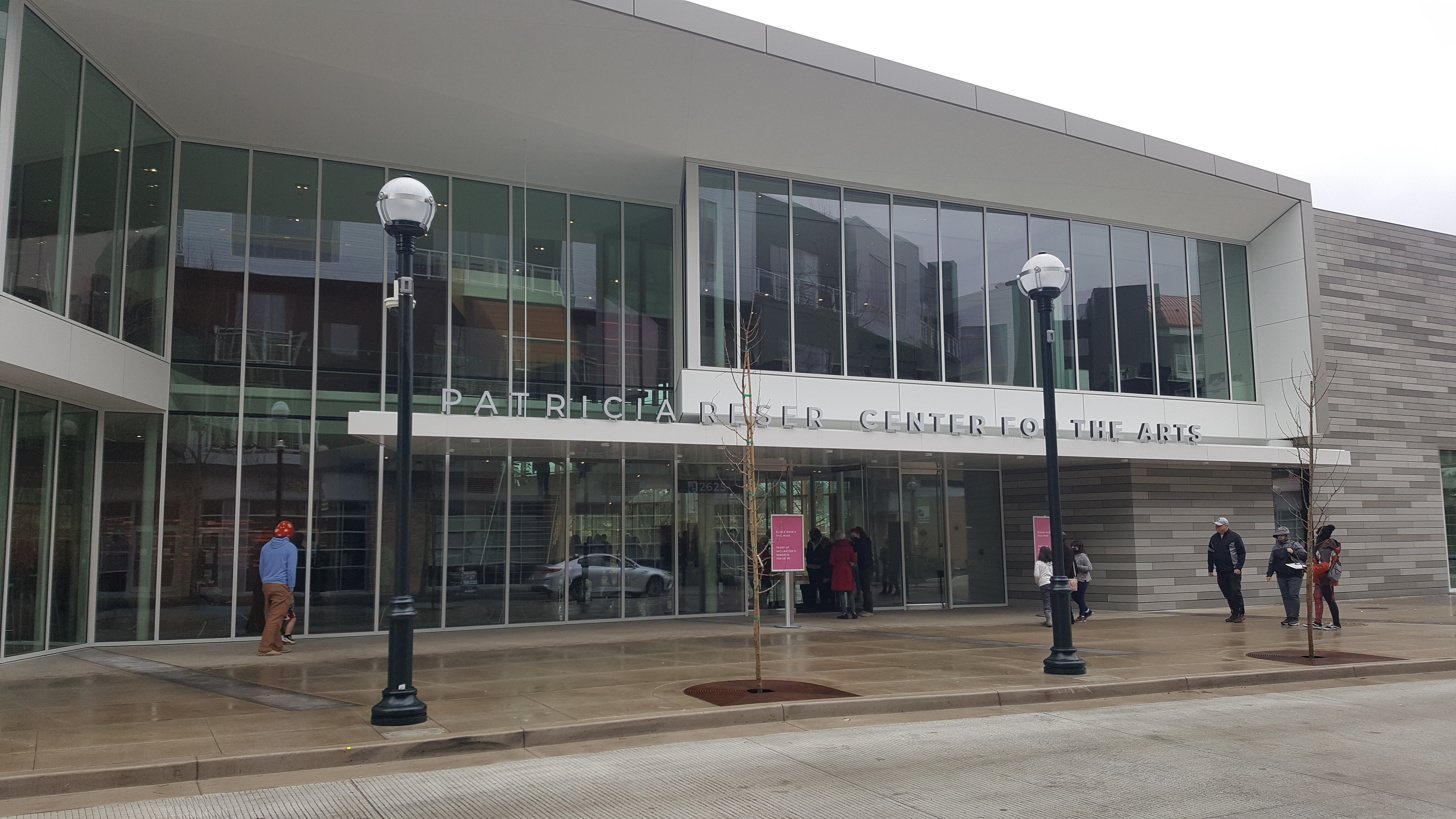
- The center's exterior in 2022
- Interactive map of Patricia Reser Center for the Arts
- Former names: Beaverton Center for the Arts
- Location: Beaverton, Oregon, U.S.
- Coordinates: 45°29′28.7″N 122°48′24.4″W
- Type: Arts center
- Public transit: Beaverton Central; 57

Construction
- Opened: March 1, 2022
- Cost: $55 million

Website
- Patricia Reser Center for the Arts, City of Beaverton, Oregon

The Patricia Reser Center for the Arts (previously known as the Beaverton Center for the Arts) is an arts center near The Round in Beaverton, Oregon, United States. The building is 46,366 square feet and seats 550 people.

== History ==
Plans for the center were approved by the Beaverton Planning Commission in February 2019, and its cost was projected to be $46 million. The grand opening was held in March 2022.

== Funding ==
Pat Reser contributed $13 million to the project via the Reser Family Foundation. The Washington County Visitors Association contributed $500,000 to the project's construction in April 2019. The state contributed $1.5 million, allocated from the Oregon Lottery, in July.

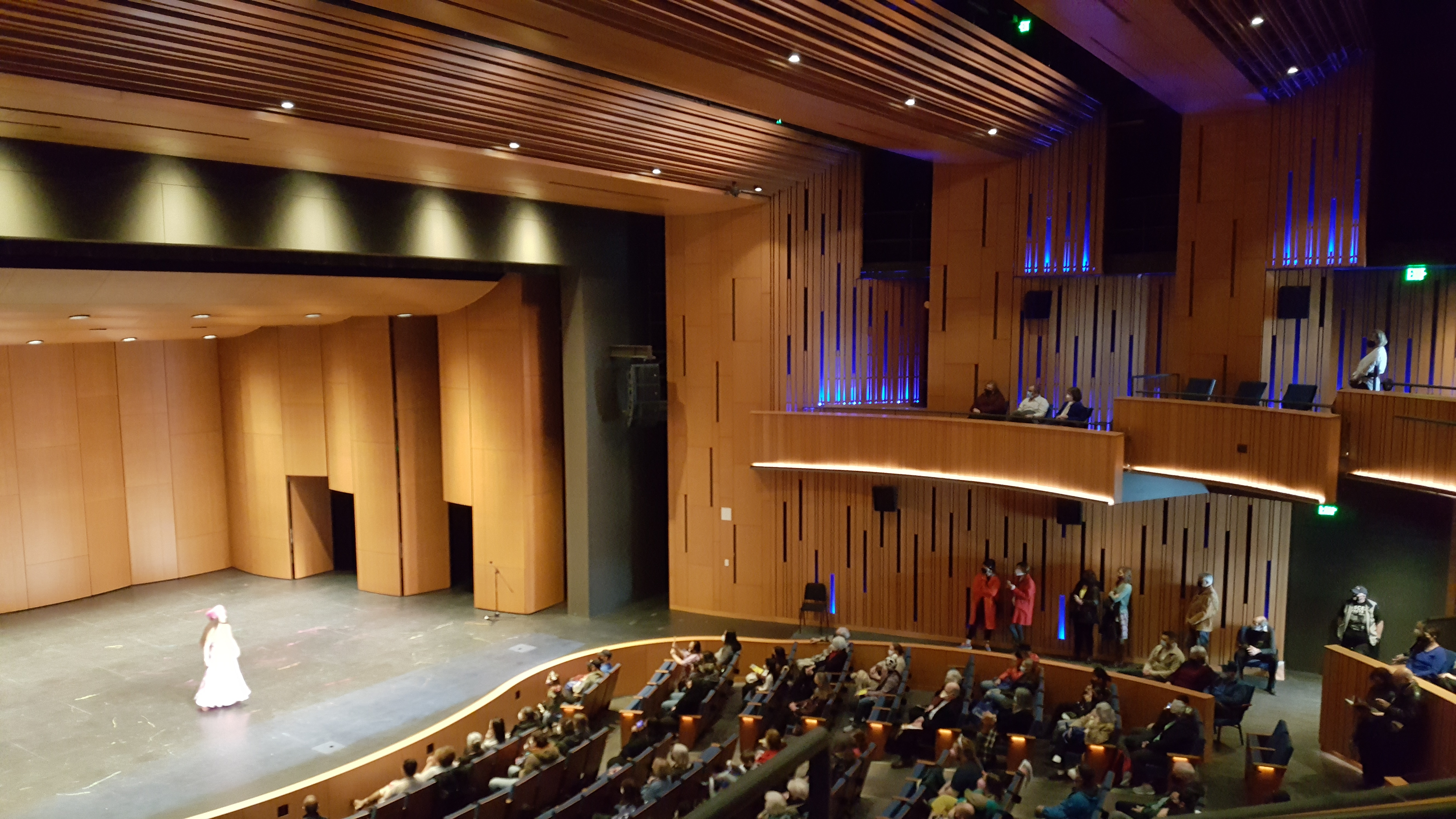

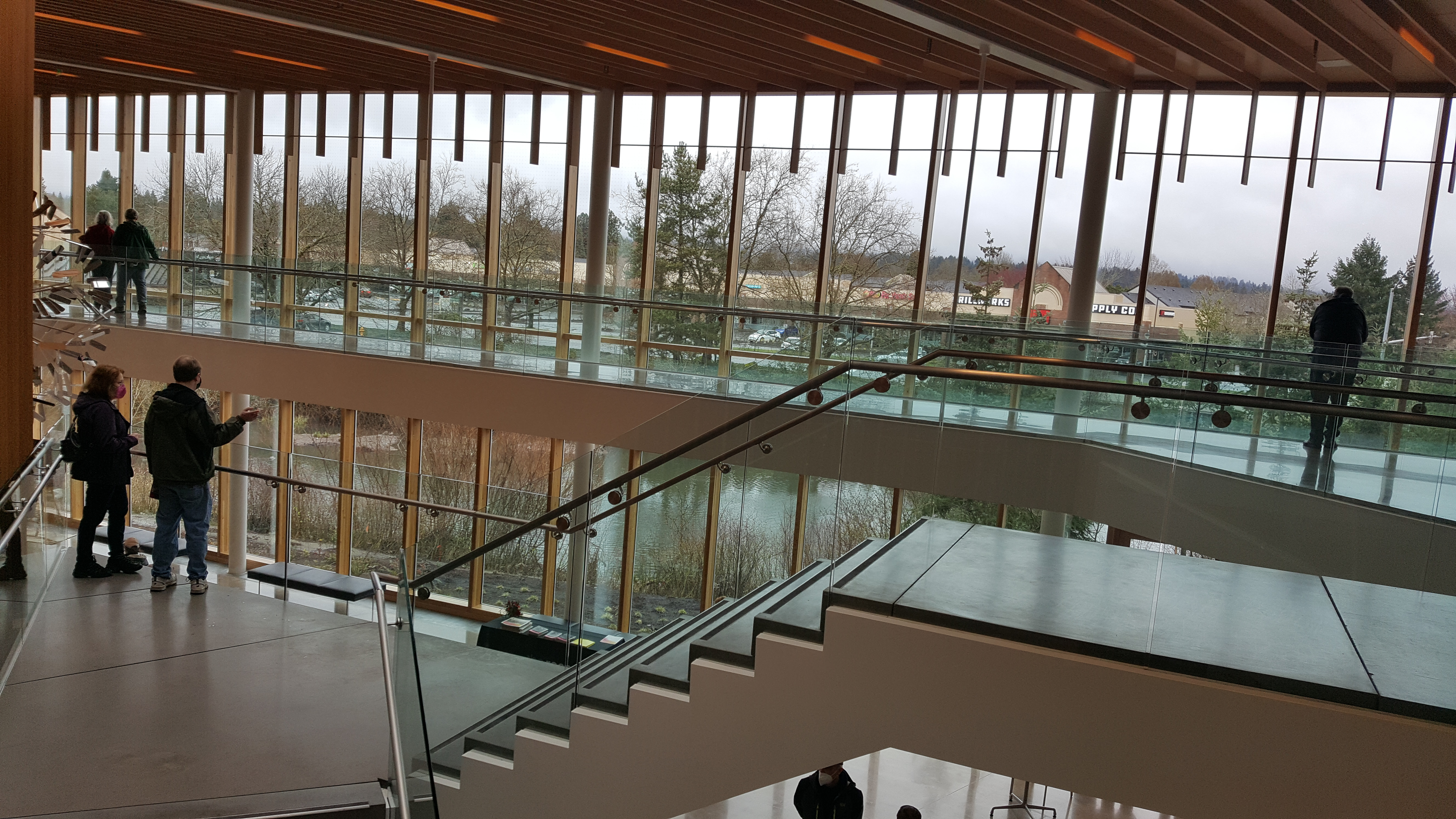

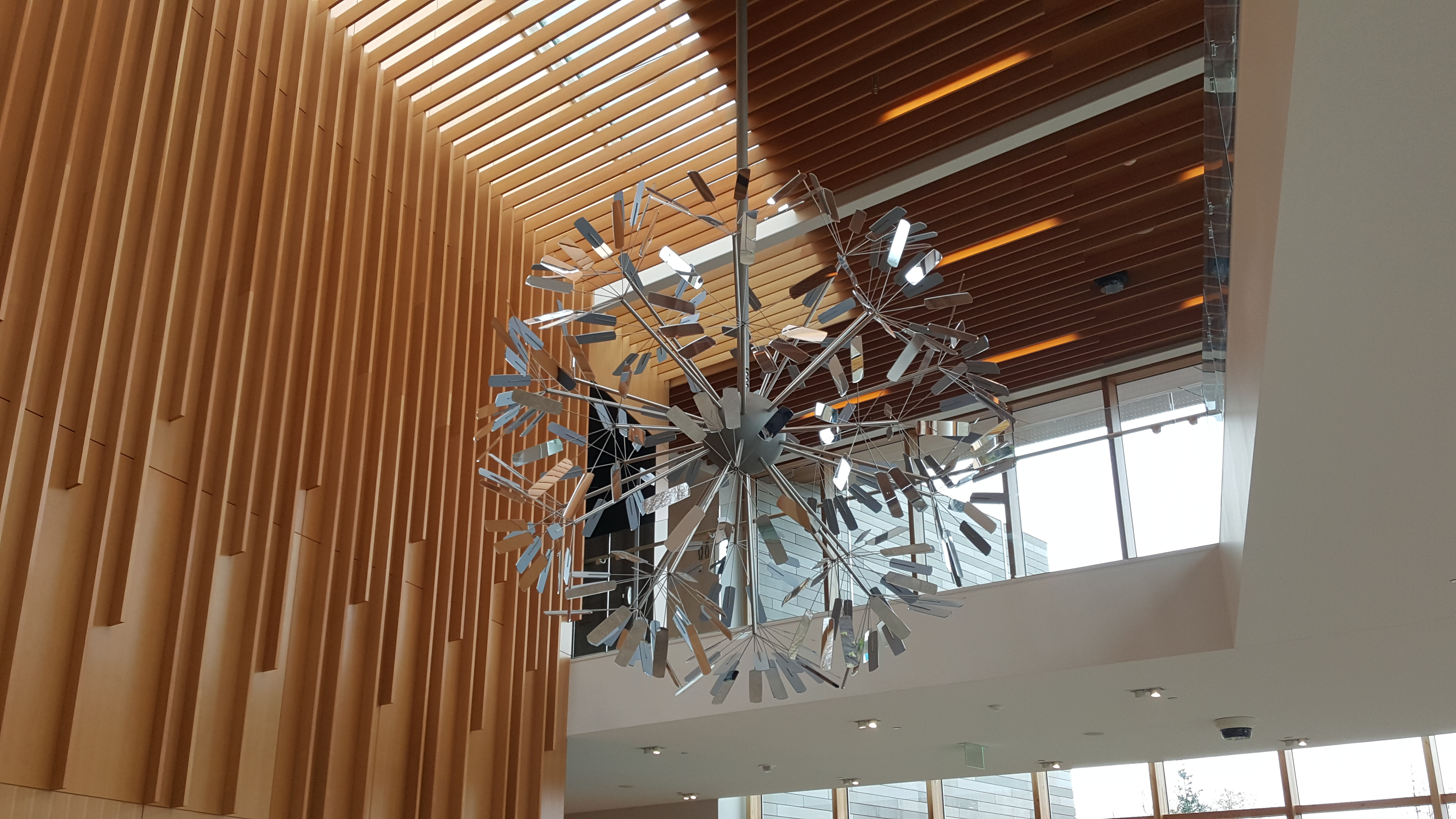
