= Beaverton, Oregon =

Beaverton, Oregon Chakeipi / Tch’′akéipi (Northern Kalapuya)
- City
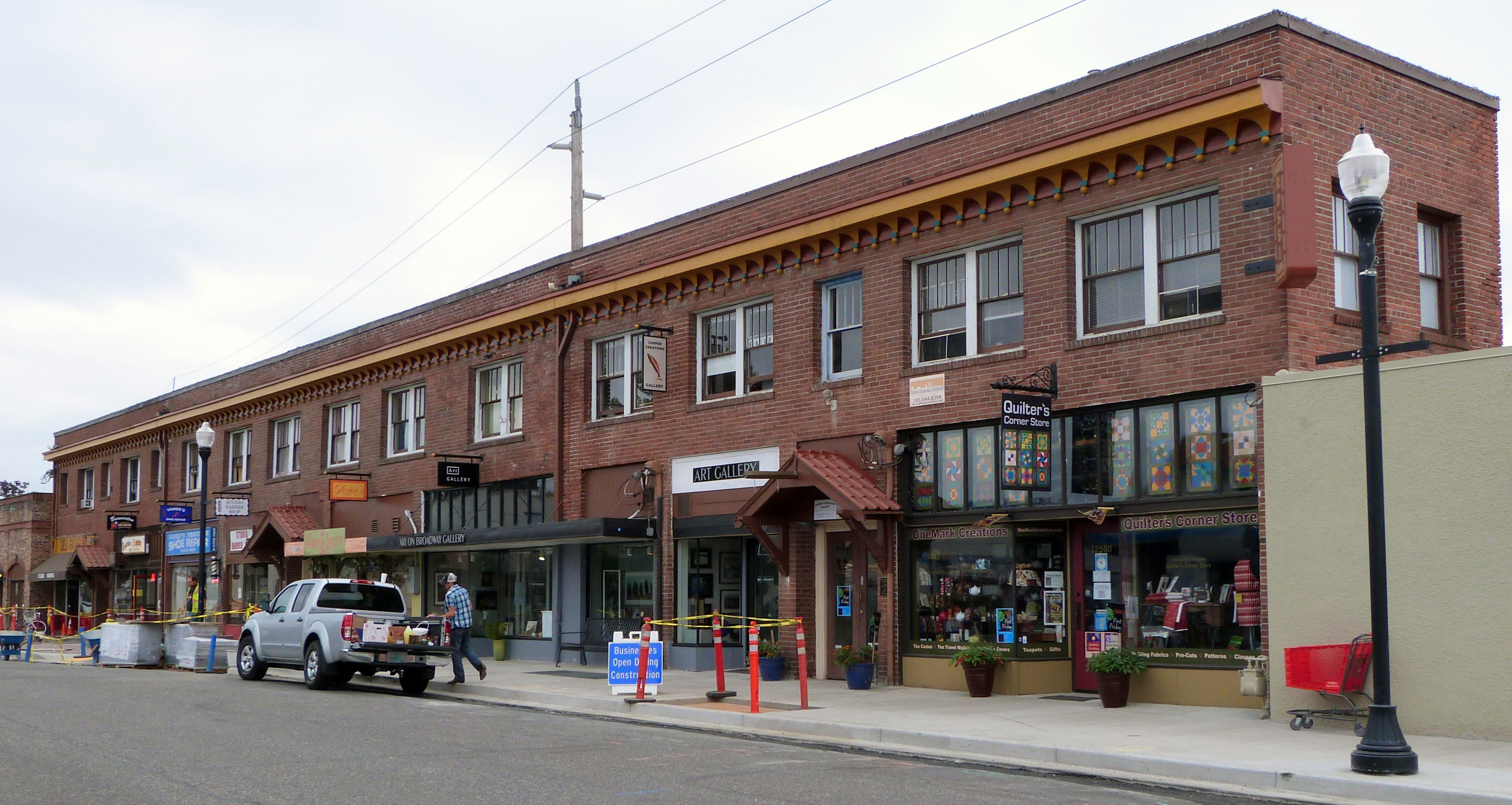
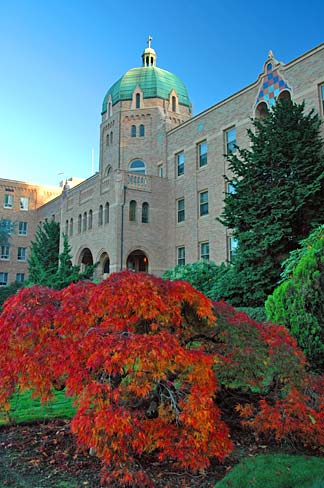
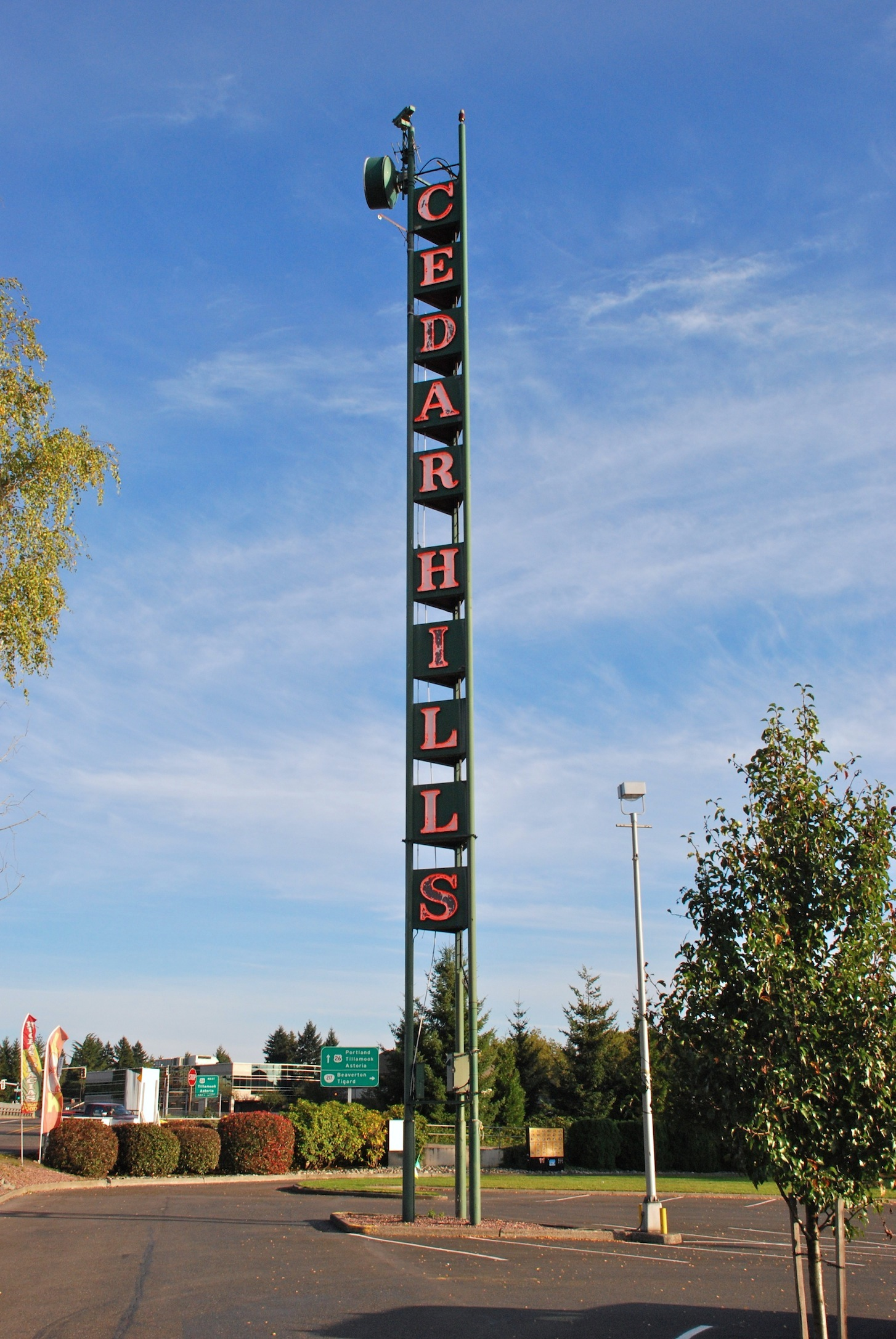
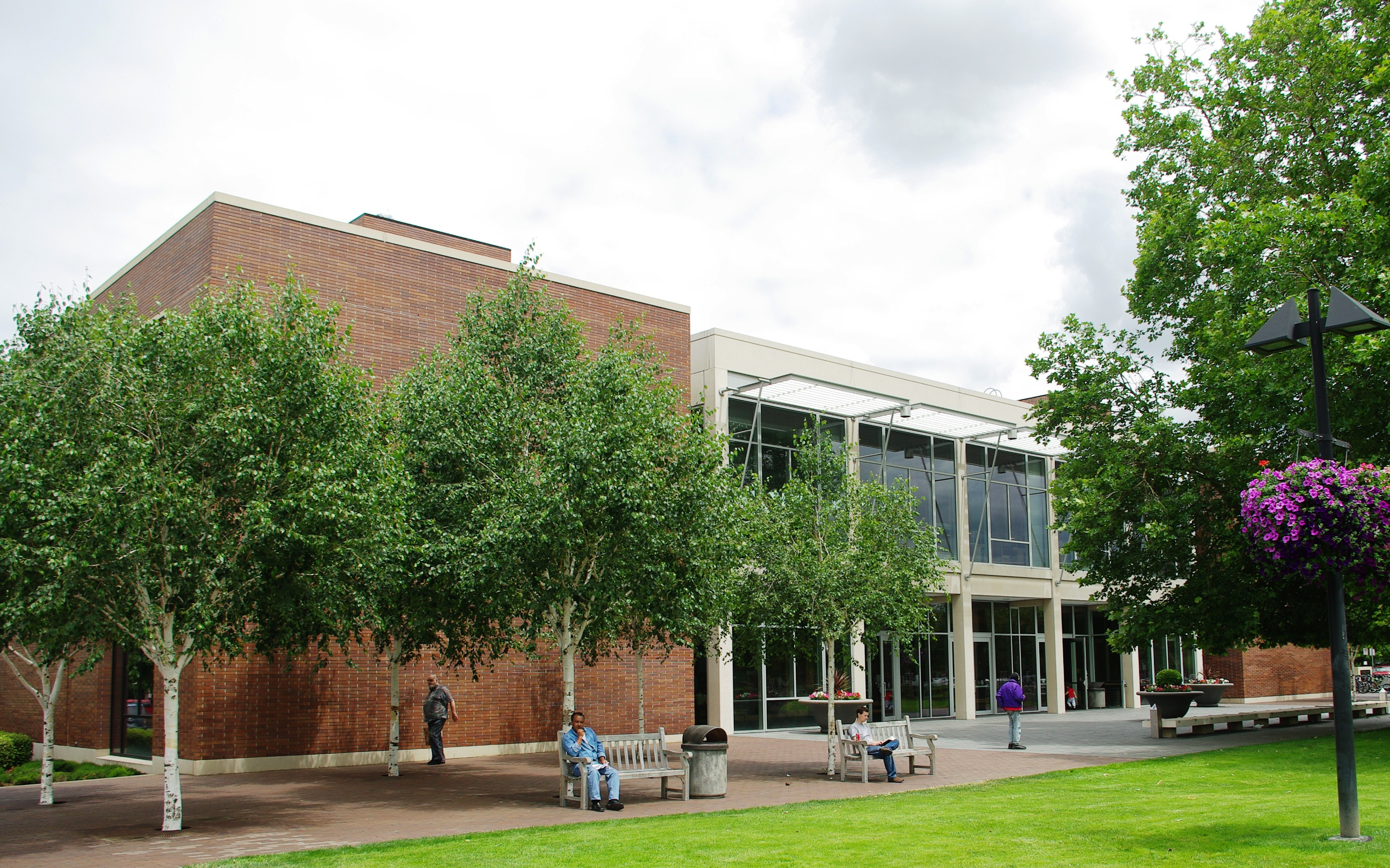
- Edward Earl Fisher Building in the Beaverton Downtown Historic District Sisters of St. Mary of Oregon Cedar Hills neon sign Beaverton City Library

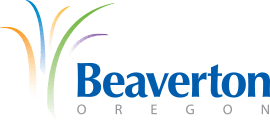
- Seal Logo
- Interactive map of Beaverton, Oregon
- Coordinates: 45°28′40″N 122°49′00″W
- Country: United States
- State: Oregon
- County: Washington
- Incorporated: 1893; 133 years ago

Government
  - Mayor: Lacey Beaty
  - City Council: Members: Ashley Hartmeier-Prigg; Kevin Teater; Edward Kimmi; Allison Tivnon; John Dugger; Nadia Hasan

Area
  - Total: 19.61 sq mi (50.80 km^{2})
  - Land: 19.61 sq mi (50.80 km^{2})
  - Water: 0 sq mi (0.00 km^{2}) 0%
- Elevation: 236 ft (72 m)

Population (2020)
  - Total: 97,494
  - Density: 4,970.4/sq mi (1,919.08/km^{2})
- Demonym: Beavertonian
- Time zone: UTC−8 (PST)
  - Summer (DST): UTC−7 (PDT)
- ZIP codes: 97003, 97005-97008, 97075-97078
- Area codes: 503 and 971
- FIPS code: 41-05350
- GNIS feature ID: 2409808
- Website: beavertonoregon.gov

Beaverton is a city located in Washington County in the U.S. state of Oregon, with a small portion bordering Portland. The city is among the main cities that make up the Portland metropolitan area. Its population was 97,494 at the 2020 census, making it the second most populous city in the county and the seventh-most populous city in Oregon. Beaverton is an economic center for Washington County along with neighboring Hillsboro.

== History ==
=== Early settlement ===
According to Oregon Geographic Names, Beaverton's name is derived from the settlement's proximity to a large body of water resulting from beaver dams.

The area of Tualatin Valley that became Beaverton was originally the home of a Native American tribe known as the Atfalati, which settlers mispronounced as Tualatin. The Atfalati population dwindled in the latter part of the 18th century, and the prosperous tribe was no longer dominant in the area by the 19th century when settlers arrived. The tribe named their village Chakeipi, which translates to "place of the beaver", which early settlers referred to as "Beaverdam."

Early settlers include the Hall Family from Kentucky, the Denneys who lived on their claim near present-day Scholls Ferry Road and Hall Blvd, and Orin S. Allen, from western New York. Lawrence Hall purchased 640 acres (2.6 km^{2}) in Beaverdam in 1847 and built a grist mill with his brother near present-day Walker Road. His was the first land claim in the area. He was soon followed by Thomas Denney in 1848, who came to the area and built its first sawmill. In 1860, a toll plank road from Portland to Beaverton was completed over a trail called Canyon Road.

After the American Civil War, numerous other settlers, including Joshua Welch, George Betts, Charles Angel, W. P. Watson, and John Henry, laid out what is now known as Beaverton hoping they could bring a railroad to an area once described as, "mostly swamps & marshes connected by beaver dams to create what looked like a huge lake." In 1872, Beaverton's first post office opened in a general store operated by Betts, who also served as the first postmaster of the community. Betts Street, where the current post office now stands, is named in honor of him. In 1893, Beaverton, which by that time had a population of 400, was officially incorporated. Alonzo Cady, a local businessman, served as the first mayor. Many major roads in Beaverton are named for these early settlers.

=== 20th century ===
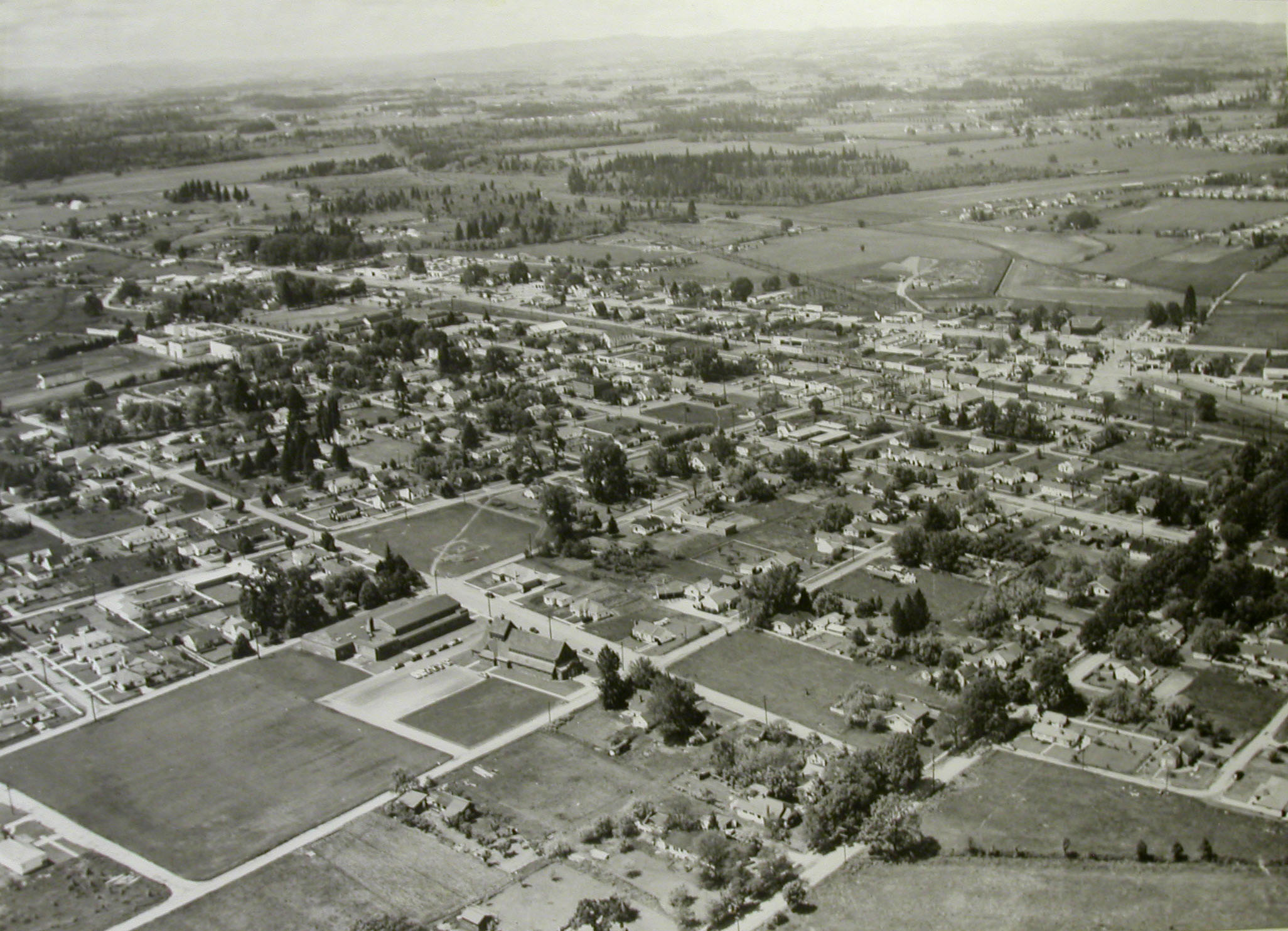
Aerial view of Beaverton in the 1950s

Beaverton was an early home to automobile dealerships. A Ford Motor Company dealership was established there in 1915; it was purchased by Guy Carr in 1923 and over the years Carr expanded it into several locations throughout Beaverton. There are still several dealerships near the intersection of Walker and Canyon Roads.

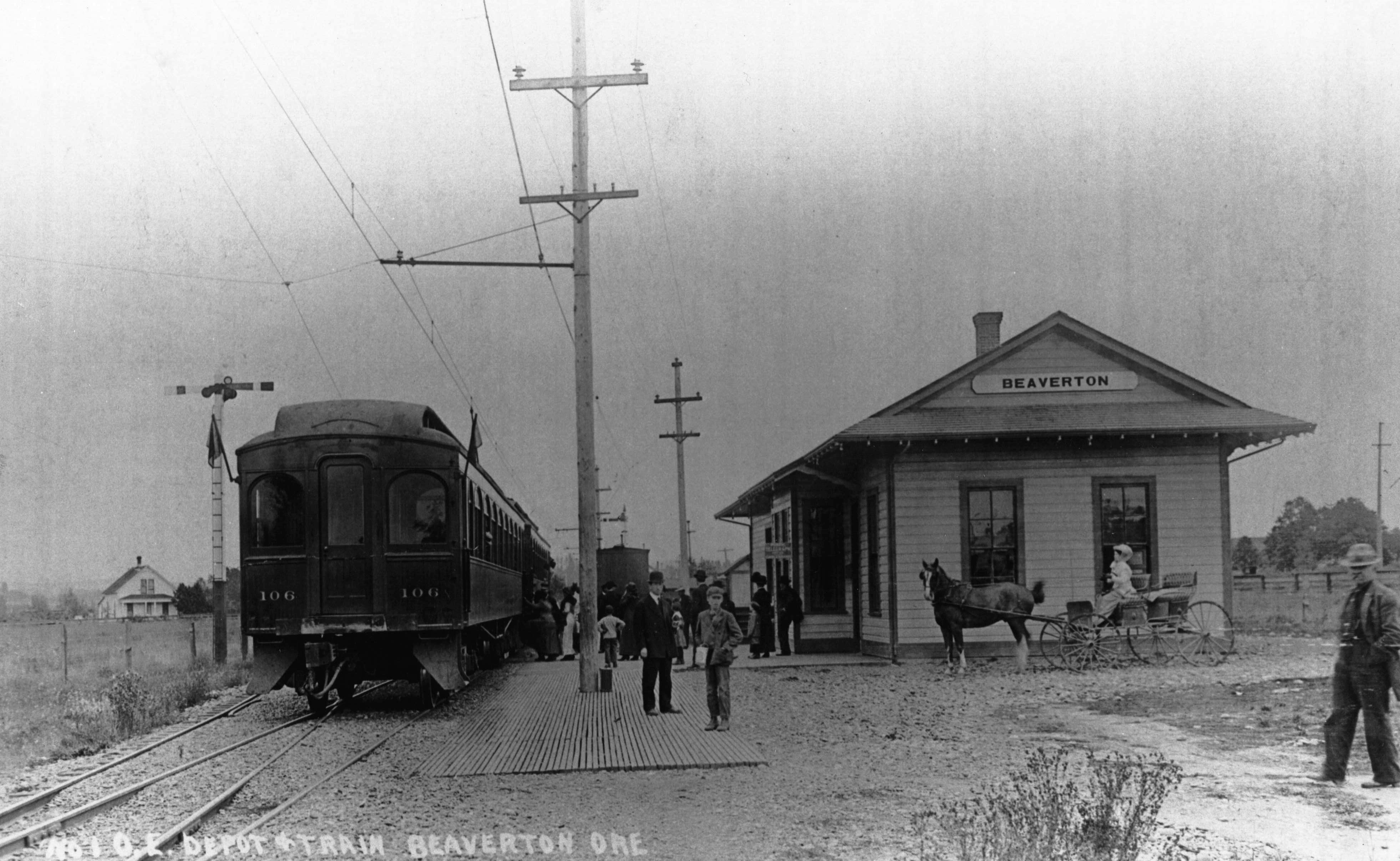
Beaverton Depot for Oregon Electric Railway, c. 1911

In the early 1920s, Beaverton was home to Premium Picture Productions, a movie studio which produced about fifteen films. The studio site was later converted into Watt's Field and associated aircraft manufacturing facilities. A second Beaverton airport, Bernard's Airport, was later developed farther north, at the present location of the Cedar Hills Crossing mall.

The town's first library opened in 1925. Originally on the second floor of the Cady building, it has been moved repeatedly; in 2000 it was moved to its current location on Hall Boulevard and 5th Street. A branch location was opened for the first time in June 2010, when the Murray-Scholls location opened near the Murrayhill neighborhood. The Beaverton libraries and 15 other local libraries participate in the Washington County Cooperative Library Services.

=== 21st century ===
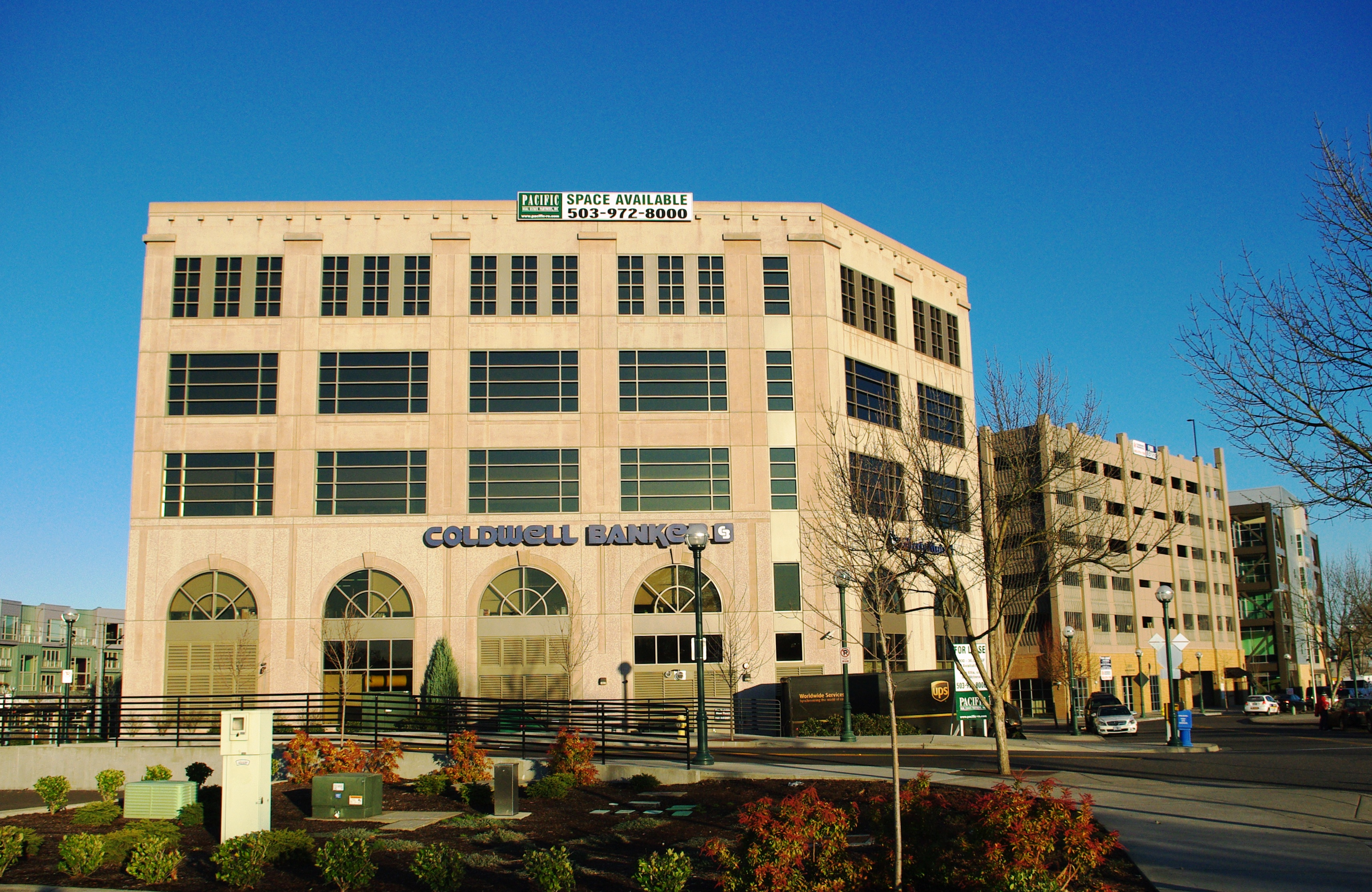
The Round in 2009

In December 2004, the city and Washington County announced an "interim plan" which would lead to Beaverton becoming the second-largest city in Oregon, second only to Portland. The "interim" plan actually covered a period of more than ten years; from the county's perspective, the plan supported its strategy of having cities and special districts provide urban services. The city of Beaverton also attempted to annex certain businesses, including Nike, which responded with a legal and lobbying effort to resist the annexation. The lobbying effort succeeded quickly, with the Oregon Legislative Assembly enacting Senate Bill 887, which prohibited Beaverton from annexing Nike without the company's consent. The bill also applied to property owned by Electro Scientific Industries, Columbia Sportswear, and Tektronix, and in August 2008 the Oregon Land Use Board of Appeals ruled that the bill also barred the city from annexing property belonging to Leupold & Stevens. (See below, under Economy.) Beaverton's legal efforts to annex Nike cost the city over one million dollars.

The Oregon State Legislature has also passed legislation which redetermined Washington County's urban growth boundary to include more development. In 2018, the Metro Council voted to once again expand the urban growth boundary to include the Cooper Mountain urban reserve area.

In 2016, voters approved a $35 million bond for a new 75,000-square-foot (7,000 m^{2}) Public Safety Center built to withstand a major earthquake. The center, which opened in fall of 2020, now houses the city's Emergency Management and Police Departments. Construction began in September 2018.

The city has tried to encourage transit-oriented development around the city's MAX Light Rail stations. The Round, a mixed-use development around Beaverton Central MAX Station on the site of a former sewer plant, was announced in 1996. In 2014, the City of Beaverton moved its city hall into The Beaverton Building, an office building in The Round. The Round currently consists of 24,000 square foot of retail space with 63 residential condominiums located above. BG's Food Cartel, Beaverton's first food cart pod, opened in 2018 and has 31 food carts, a speakeasy bar, and an event venue. Adjacent to The Round, the 550 seat Patricia Reser Center for the Arts opened in 2022, and was made possible by pledges from the Beaverton Arts Foundation and Pat Reser along with public sources. The groundbreaking was performed on November 13, 2019. In addition to the Reser Center, a new 125-room hotel opened next to The Round in February 2021. The performing arts center, apartments, city hall, hotel, MAX light rail station, plazas, food carts, and nearby businesses are collectively known as Downtown Beaverton.

== Geography ==
Beaverton covers a total area of 19.7 square miles (51 km^{2}), all of it land except for small creeks, ponds, and lakes. The city is located along the eastern edge of the Tualatin Valley just west of the Tualatin Mountains. It is bordered by Portland to the east, Hillsboro to the west, and Tigard to the south. Much of the remaining area surrounding Beaverton in the north and southwest constitutes unincorporated Washington County land. The elevation within city limits ranges from as high as 698.2 feet (212.8 m) above sea level to as low as 131.7 feet (40.1 m) above sea level. The city averages at 189 feet (58 m) above sea level.

=== Neighborhoods ===
The city of Beaverton is divided into 13 neighborhoods: Central Beaverton, Denney Whitford, Raleigh West, Five Oaks, Triple Creek, Greenway, Highland, Neighbors Southwest, Sexton Mountain, South Beaverton, Vose, West Beaverton, and West Slope. Each neighborhood runs a Neighborhood Association Committee (NAC) to discuss neighborhood affairs, with the exception of Five Oaks and Triple Creek, and Denney Whitford and Raleigh West each sharing a NAC.

=== Climate ===
Climate data for Beaverton, Oregon (normals 1972–2007, heat extremes 1972–present)
Month	Jan	Feb	Mar	Apr	May	Jun	Jul	Aug	Sep	Oct	Nov	Dec	Year
Record high °F (°C)	66 (19)	73 (23)	79 (26)	94 (34)	101 (38)	115 (46)	106 (41)	105 (41)	100 (38)	91 (33)	72 (22)	64 (18)	115 (46)
Mean daily maximum °F (°C)	46.8 (8.2)	51.1 (10.6)	56.6 (13.7)	62.0 (16.7)	67.7 (19.8)	73.3 (22.9)	79.5 (26.4)	80.1 (26.7)	75.3 (24.1)	64.2 (17.9)	52.6 (11.4)	46.4 (8.0)	63.0 (17.2)
Daily mean °F (°C)	40.3 (4.6)	43.1 (6.2)	46.9 (8.3)	51.0 (10.6)	56.4 (13.6)	61.7 (16.5)	66.6 (19.2)	66.6 (19.2)	62.3 (16.8)	53.4 (11.9)	45.3 (7.4)	40.2 (4.6)	52.8 (11.6)
Mean daily minimum °F (°C)	33.8 (1.0)	35.1 (1.7)	37.4 (3.0)	40.4 (4.7)	45.1 (7.3)	50.0 (10.0)	53.7 (12.1)	53.1 (11.7)	49.3 (9.6)	42.7 (5.9)	37.9 (3.3)	34.0 (1.1)	42.7 (5.9)
Record low °F (°C)	0 (−18)	8 (−13)	14 (−10)	26 (−3)	31 (−1)	33 (1)	41 (5)	36 (2)	31 (−1)	22 (−6)	9 (−13)	−8 (−22)	−8 (−22)
Average precipitation inches (mm)	5.79 (147)	4.55 (116)	3.83 (97)	2.69 (68)	2.22 (56)	1.56 (40)	0.62 (16)	0.87 (22)	1.49 (38)	2.90 (74)	5.99 (152)	6.53 (166)	39.05 (992)
Average snowfall inches (cm)	0.6 (1.5)	0.5 (1.3)	0.1 (0.25)	0 (0)	0 (0)	0 (0)	0 (0)	0 (0)	0 (0)	0 (0)	0.4 (1.0)	0.4 (1.0)	1.9 (4.8)
Average precipitation days (≥ 0.01 in)	18	16	17	15	12	9	4	4	7	12	18	19	151
Source 1: WRCC
Source 2: weather.com (extremes)

== Demographics ==
Historical population
Census	Pop.	Note	%±
1900	249		—
1910	386		55.0%
1920	580		50.3%
1930	1,138		96.2%
1940	1,052		−7.6%
1950	2,512		138.8%
1960	5,937		136.3%
1970	18,577		212.9%
1980	31,962		72.1%
1990	53,310		66.8%
2000	79,277		48.7%
2010	89,803		13.3%
2020	97,494		8.6%
U.S. Decennial Census; 2018 Estimate

As of the 2020 census, Beaverton had a population of 97,494.

=== Racial and ethnic composition ===
Beaverton, Oregon – Racial and ethnic composition Note: the US Census treats Hispanic/Latino as an ethnic category. This table excludes Latinos from the racial categories and assigns them to a separate category. Hispanics/Latinos may be of any race.
Race / ethnicity (NH = Non-Hispanic)	Pop 2000	Pop 2010	Pop 2020	% 2000	% 2010	% 2020
White alone (NH)	56,035	59,559	57,537	73.61%	66.32%	59.02%
Black or African American alone (NH)	1,243	2,219	2,669	1.63%	2.47%	2.74%
Native American or Alaska Native alone (NH)	384	387	334	0.50%	0.43%	0.34%
Asian alone (NH)	7,310	9,368	11,724	9.60%	10.43%	12.03%
Pacific Islander alone (NH)	263	395	503	0.35%	0.44%	0.52%
Other race alone (NH)	114	202	518	0.15%	0.22%	0.53%
Mixed Race or Multi-Racial (NH)	2,317	3,045	6,532	3.04%	3.39%	6.70%
Hispanic or Latino (any race)	8,463	14,628	17,677	11.12%	16.29%	18.13%
Total	76,129	89,803	97,494	100.00%	100.00%	100.00%

=== 2020 census ===
The median age was 36.6 years; 20.4% of residents were under the age of 18 and 14.5% were 65 years of age or older. For every 100 females there were 95.1 males, and for every 100 females age 18 and over there were 92.8 males age 18 and over.

99.9% of residents lived in urban areas, while 0.1% lived in rural areas.

There were 40,240 households in Beaverton, of which 28.0% had children under the age of 18 living in them. Of all households, 43.4% were married-couple households, 19.5% were households with a male householder and no spouse or partner present, and 27.7% were households with a female householder and no spouse or partner present. About 28.5% of all households were made up of individuals and 10.4% had someone living alone who was 65 years of age or older.

There were 42,288 housing units, of which 4.8% were vacant. Among occupied housing units, 47.5% were owner-occupied and 52.5% were renter-occupied. The homeowner vacancy rate was 0.9% and the rental vacancy rate was 5.4%.

As of 2020 the median income for a household in the city was $38,261, and the median income for a family was $71,806. Males had a median income of $41,683 versus $31,204 for females. The per capita income for the city was $25,419. About 5.0% of families and 7.8% of the population were below the poverty line, including 8.5% of those under age 18 and 6.8% of those age 65 or over.

Racial composition as of the 2020 census
Race	Number	Percent
White	60,764	62.3%
Black or African American	2,788	2.9%
American Indian and Alaska Native	972	1.0%
Asian	11,854	12.2%
Native Hawaiian and Other Pacific Islander	522	0.5%
Some other race	8,441	8.7%
Two or more races	12,153	12.5%
Hispanic or Latino (of any race)	17,677	18.1%

=== 2010 census ===
As of the census of 2010, there were 89,803 people, 37,213 households, and 21,915 families residing in the city. The population density was 4,794.6 inhabitants per square mile (1,851.2/km^{2}). There were 39,500 housing units at an average density of 2,108.9 per square mile (814.3/km^{2}). The racial makeup of the city was 73.0% White, 2.6% African American, 0.6% Native American, 10.5% Asian, 0.5% Pacific Islander, 8.2% from other races, and 4.5% from two or more races. Hispanic or Latino residents of any race were 16.3% of the population.

There were 37,213 households, of which 31.0% had children under the age of 18 living with them, 43.7% were married couples living together, 10.6% had a female householder with no husband present, 4.6% had a male householder with no wife present, and 41.1% were non-families. 30.9% of all households were made up of individuals, and 8.5% had someone living alone who was 65 years of age or older. The average household size was 2.39 and the average family size was 3.03.

The median age in the city was 34.7 years. 22.9% of residents were under the age of 18; 9.2% were between the ages of 18 and 24; 33% were from 25 to 44; 24.5% were from 45 to 64; and 10.4% were 65 years of age or older. The gender makeup of the city was 48.6% male and 51.4% female.

== Economy ==
=== Company headquarters ===
Reser's Fine Foods, processor and distributor of freshly prepared foods, has headquartered in Beaverton since 1960. Leupold & Stevens, maker of rifle scopes and other specialty optics, has been located on property adjacent to the City of Beaverton since 1968. The Beaverton City Council annexed that property in May 2005, and Leupold & Stevens challenged that annexation. The company eventually won the legal fight in 2009 with the city, thus the company was de-annexed from the city. R.M. Wade & Co., manufacturer of agricultural and irrigation equipment, is the oldest family-owned company in the state of Oregon.

=== Technology companies ===
As part of the Silicon Forest, Beaverton is the location of numerous technology organizations and companies, including Linux Technology Center of IBM, Tektronix, ADI formerly known as Maxim Integrated Products, VeriWave, Khronos Group and Oregon Technology Business Center (OTBC), a non-profit tech startup incubator. Phoenix Technologies operates its Northwestern Regional Office in Beaverton.

=== Largest employers ===
According to the City's 2024 Comprehensive Annual Financial Report, the largest employers in the city are:

#	Employer	# of employees
1	Nike	6,019
2	Beaverton School District	4,289
3	Analog Devices	883
4	City of Beaverton	672
5	Fred Meyer	597
6	Pacific Office Automation	477
7	Home Depot	406
8	New Seasons Market	351
9	Lanphere Enterprises	324
10	Transdev	310

=== Tourist attractions ===
- Beaverton Farmer's Market
- BG's Food Cartel
- Cooper Mountain Nature Park
- Cooper Mountain Vineyards
- Hyland Forest Park
- Patricia Reser Center for the Arts
- Tualatin Hills Nature Park
- Veterans Memorial Park
- Jenkins Estate

=== Shopping ===
Cedar Hills Crossing is a shopping mall within the city of Beaverton. Facilities include a variety of restaurants, big-box retailers, a bowling alley, and more. Progress Ridge Town Square is a lifestyle center also in Beaverton which includes shops and restaurants.

== Government ==
Presidential election results

Presidential election results in Beaverton
Year	Democratic	Republican	Others
2020	72.3% 37,165	24.4% 12,548	3.3% 1,690
2016	63.4% 27,688	24.9% 10,866	11.7% 5,108

The current mayor of Beaverton is Lacey Beaty, who was first elected in 2020. The Beaverton City Council consists of six councilors. The Mayor and City Councilors are all elected at large to serve four-year terms in a council-manager form of government where the Beaverton City Council and Mayor hire a city manager who is the administrative head of the city.

== Sports ==
The Howard M. Terpenning Recreation Complex, opened in 1978, features swimming, athletics, tennis, baseball, softball and basketball facilities.

The Evelyn M. Schiffler Memorial Park in central Beaverton, redeveloped in 2008, features basketball courts and a skate park.

=== Little League ===
In 2014, the Beaverton–Aloha Little League Intermediate baseball team won the state tournament and traveled to Nogales, Arizona to play in the regional tournament, where they accumulated a 2–2 record.

In 2006, the Murrayhill Little League baseball team qualified for the 2006 Little League World Series, the first Oregon team in 48 years to go that far. Murrayhill advanced to the semi-finals before losing; the third-place game was rained out and not rescheduled. In addition, a Junior Softball team from Beaverton went to 2006 World Series in Kirkland, Washington, ending in sixth place.

In 2002, Beaverton's Little League Softball team took second place to Waco, Texas, in the Little League Softball World Series.

=== Curling ===
In January 2013, Beaverton became the first city in Oregon to have an ice rink dedicated to the sport of curling, the Evergreen Curling Club. In January 2017, the Evergreen Curling Club hosted the United States Curling Association Senior Women's National Championship.

== Education ==
The public schools serving most of Beaverton are part of the Beaverton School District. There are six public high schools in the district – Aloha High School, Beaverton High School, Mountainside High School, Southridge High School, Sunset High School, and Westview High School. It also has several public option schools serving grades 6-12 like the International School of Beaverton, Arts and Communication Magnet Academy, and Beaverton Academy of Science and Engineering. Merlo Station High School is another alternative learning school within the district.

Portions of Beaverton are in the Hillsboro School District and the Portland Public Schools school district.

Private schools in the area include German American School, Holy Trinity School, Jesuit High School, Saint Cecilia Grade School, Southwest Christian School, Valley Catholic School, Willamette Valley Academy, and WoodHaven School.

=== Colleges and universities ===
- Portland Community College (PCC) – Although it is based in Portland, some facilities operate in Beaverton.

== Infrastructure ==
Fire protection is provided through Tualatin Valley Fire and Rescue. EMS services are provided by Metro West Ambulance.

=== Transportation ===
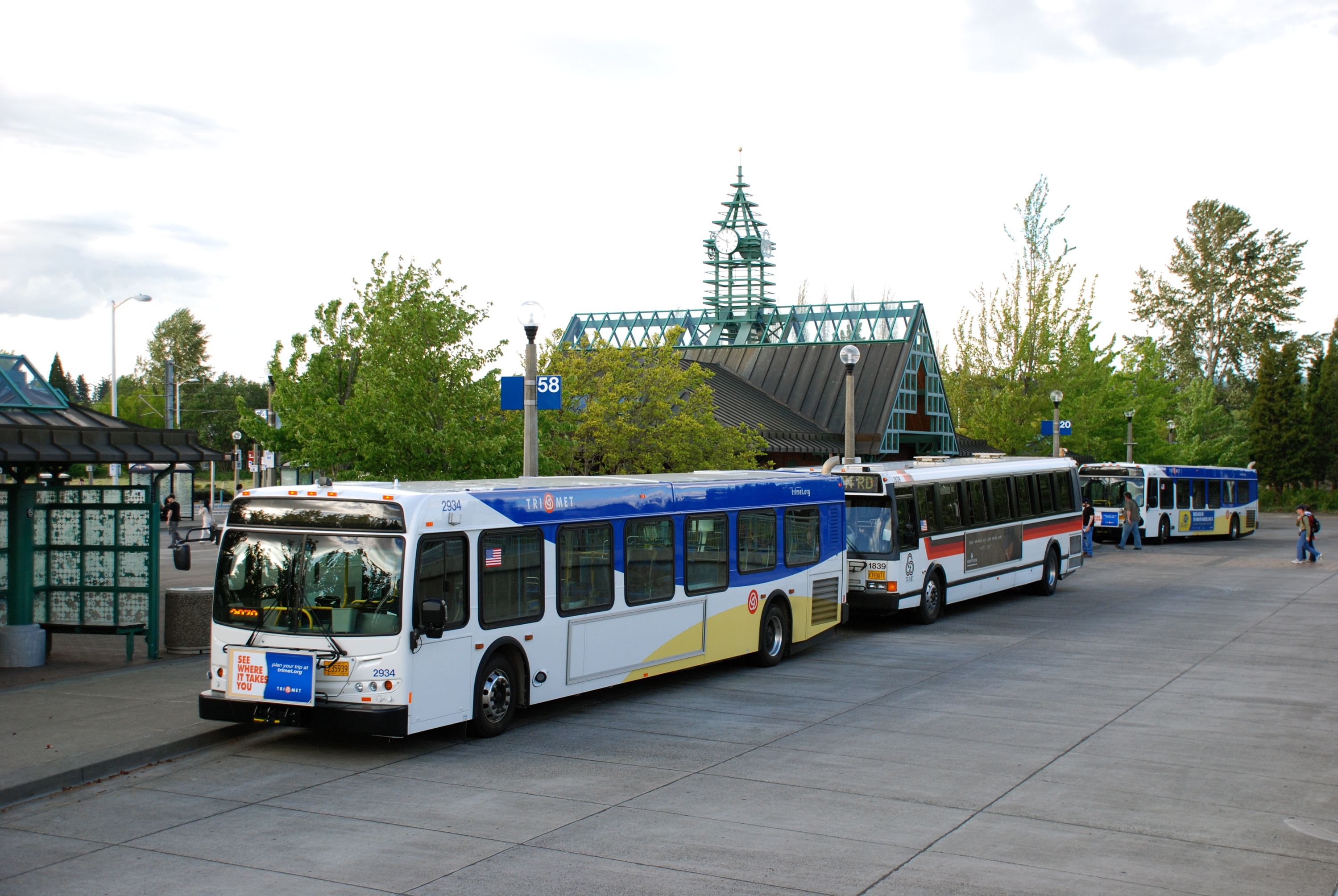
TriMet buses parked at Beaverton Transit Center

Beaverton is served by transit bus, commuter rail, and light rail services operated by the Portland metropolitan area's regional transit agency, TriMet. MAX Light Rail serves the city with seven light rail stations; from west to east, they are: Elmonica/Southwest 170th Avenue, Merlo Road/Southwest 158th Avenue, Beaverton Creek, Millikan Way, Beaverton Central, Beaverton Transit Center, and Sunset Transit Center. The MAX Blue Line serves all seven stations while the MAX Red Line serves only Beaverton Transit Center and Sunset Transit Center. Beaverton Transit Center, TriMet's busiest transit center, in addition to MAX, serves as a transit hub for bus routes mostly operating on the west side and as the northern terminus of WES Commuter Rail. Hall/Nimbus, the second station southbound on WES, is also located in Beaverton. Intercity bus services with stops in Beaverton include POINT and TCTD.

Oregon Electric and Red Electric interurban lines once served the city in the early 20th century. In the 1940s, Tualatin Valley Stages, a division of Portland Stages, Inc., provided limited bus transit service between the city and downtown Portland; it operated later as a separate company, Tualatin Valley Buses, Inc., through the 1960s. This was one of four privately owned bus companies that served the Portland metropolitan area and were collectively known as the "Blue Bus" lines. All four companies were replaced in 1970 by TriMet, which expanded bus service to cover more areas of Beaverton.

The city is the location of a major freeway interchange for U.S. Route 26 (US 26; Sunset Highway) and Oregon Route 217 (OR 217). The Sunset Highway connects Beaverton to Hillsboro and the Oregon Coast to the west and Portland to the east. OR 217 travels from Beaverton south through Tigard and terminates at an interchange with Interstate 5 (I-5).

== Notable people ==
- David Adelman, head coach of the Denver Nuggets
- James Allsup, political commentator
- Shoshana Bean, singer, actress
- Charles E. Bernard, aviator
- Suzanne Bonamici, U.S. representative, former Oregon state senator and Oregon state representative
- Chase Boone, soccer player
- Cameron Brink, basketball player
- John Brotherton, actor
- Mike Byrne, drummer for the Smashing Pumpkins
- Janet Chvatal, actress
- Grace Crunican, general manager for Bay Area Rapid Transit
- Ward Cunningham, inventor of the wiki
- Mike Dunleavy Jr., basketball player and general manager of the Golden State Warriors
- Brad Fitzpatrick, programmer
- Ted Geoghegan, screenwriter
- Barrie Gilbert, inventor
- Erik Hurtado, professional soccer player
- Ian Karmel, stand-up comedian and writer
- Carson Kelly, Major League Baseball catcher
- Gloria Calderon Kellett, writer
- Anne Kenney, television producer
- Morten Lauridsen, composer
- Michael McQuilken, director
- Moultrie Patten, jazz musician
- Rubio Rubin, professional soccer player
- Katee Sackhoff, actor
- Ari Shapiro, radio journalist
- Royal Skousen, professor
- Mike "Smitty" Smith, drummer for Paul Revere & the Raiders
- Todd Snider, musician
- Courtney Taylor-Taylor, lead singer of The Dandy Warhols
- James B. Thayer, U.S. Army brigadier general
- Tommy Thayer, lead guitarist for Kiss

== Sister cities ==
Beaverton's sister cities are:

- Birobidzhan, Russia (1990)
- Cheonan, South Korea (1989)
- Cluses, France (1999)
- Gotemba, Japan (1987)
- Hsinchu, Taiwan (1988)
- Trossingen, Germany (1993)
