= Cooper Mountain Vineyards =

Winery in Oregon, United States

Coordinates: 45.450543°N 122.888113°W

- Location: Beaverton, Oregon, U.S.
- Appellation: Willamette Valley AVA
- Founded: 1978
- First vintage: 1987
- Known for: Pinot Noir
- Varietals: Pinot gris, Chardonnay, Pinot blanc, Malbec
- Other products: Balsamic vinegar
- Distribution: National
- Tasting: Open to public
- Website: www.coopermountainwine.com

Cooper Mountain Vineyards is an American winery located in Beaverton, Oregon, United States. Started in 1978, the certified organic wine maker produces Pinot noir, Pinot gris, Chardonnay, and Pinot blanc. Located in the Portland metropolitan area, the vineyard is sited on the western slopes of Cooper Mountain, an extinct volcano.

In 2022, the Oregon Department of Environmental Quality fined Cooper Mountain Vineyards $5,640 for discharging wastewater to McKernan Creek without a permit. The civil penalty notice also claims the vineyard failed to collect wastewater land application data for 2019, 2020, and 2021.

== History ==
The winery was founded in 1978 by Dr. Robert Gross and his wife Corrine and released its first vintage in 1987. The vineyards obtained state organic certification in 1995, and biodynamic certification in 1999. In 2004, the winery released a third tier of wine called Cooper Hill to add to its two existing tiers: Cooper Mountain Reserves and 5 Elements Series. The winery released its first balsamic vinegar in 2006. Current production at the winery is 20,000 cases.

== Organic ==
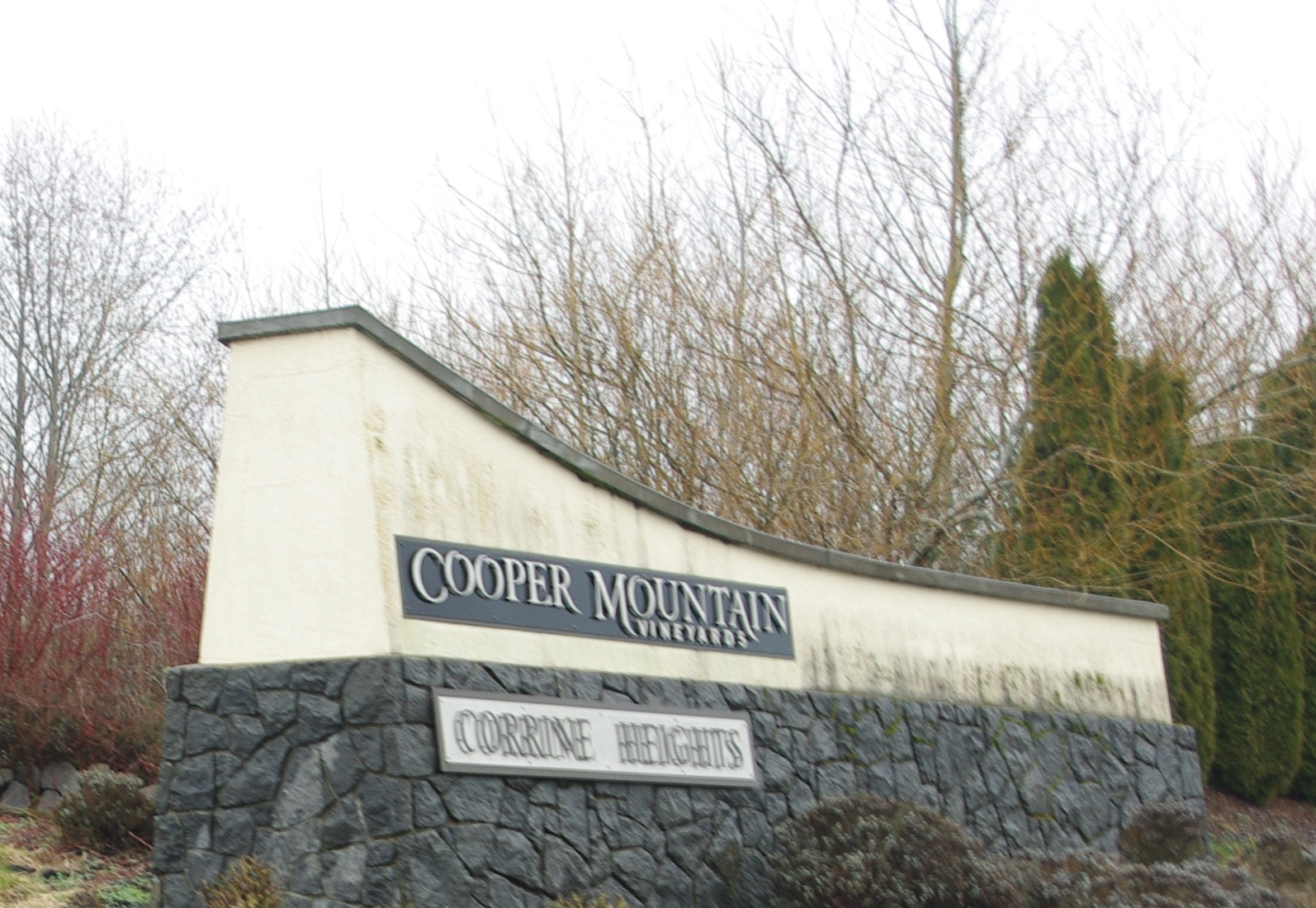
Entrance to the vineyard

All wines produced from Cooper Mountain are estate bottled and certified both organic and Biodynamic. The organic certification was done by Oregon Tilth, and the Biodynamic certification was done by Demeter International. The winery has 120 acres (0.49 km^{2}) of grapes in production, producing four varietals (Pinot noir, Pinot gris, Chardonnay, and Pinot blanc).

The winery owns and manages five different vineyards with organic and biodynamic certification. The names of the vineyard sites are Old Vines, planted in 1978, Meadowlark, planted in 1982, Farmington, planted in 1998, and Johnson School, planted in 2000 and Corrine planted in 1989. Cooper Mountain Vineyards produces a no-sulfite Pinot noir called Life Wine. Cooper Mountain is one of the small number of wineries in the state that are certified as biodynamic.

== See also ==
- Biodynamic wine
- Oregon wine
