= R.M. Wade & Co. =

American tractor manufacturer

- Trade name: R.M. Wade & Co.
- Industry: Agricultural
- Founded: 1865; 161 years ago
- Founder: Robert M. Wade
- Headquarters: Beaverton, Oregon
- Website: www.rmwade.com

R.M. Wade & Co. is a Beaverton, Oregon based manufacturer of agricultural and irrigation equipment. Founded in 1865 by Robert M. Wade, it is the oldest family-owned company in the state of Oregon. It is notable for creating the Wade Drag Saw in the early 1930s, and its national distribution of the Ford-Ferguson Tractor. It is the parent company of Wade Rain, one of the first irrigation companies in the United States, which currently sells farming and irrigation products internationally.

== History ==
R.M. Wade & Co. was founded by Robert Morris Wade in 1865, fifteen years after he crossed the Oregon Trail as a teenager. In the midst of the California Gold rush in the year 1855, he arrived in California and set up a supply store in a gold mining camp. Following this, he moved to Salem, Oregon and founded R.M. Wade & Co. The company primarily sold farming equipment and buggies to agricultural dealers in the state of Oregon. By 1888, it had branches in Tillamook, McMinnville, Salem, Corvallis, Independence, and Portland. Mr. Wade's son-in-law, Edward J. Newbegin (spouse of Susan Wade), became president in 1915. Under his leadership, the company produced the Wade Drag Saw, the predecessor of the common chainsaw, which was sold internationally for several decades. In 1927 R.M. Wade & Co. purchased Multnomah Iron Works, later to become R.M. Wade's subsidiary company, Wade Rain.

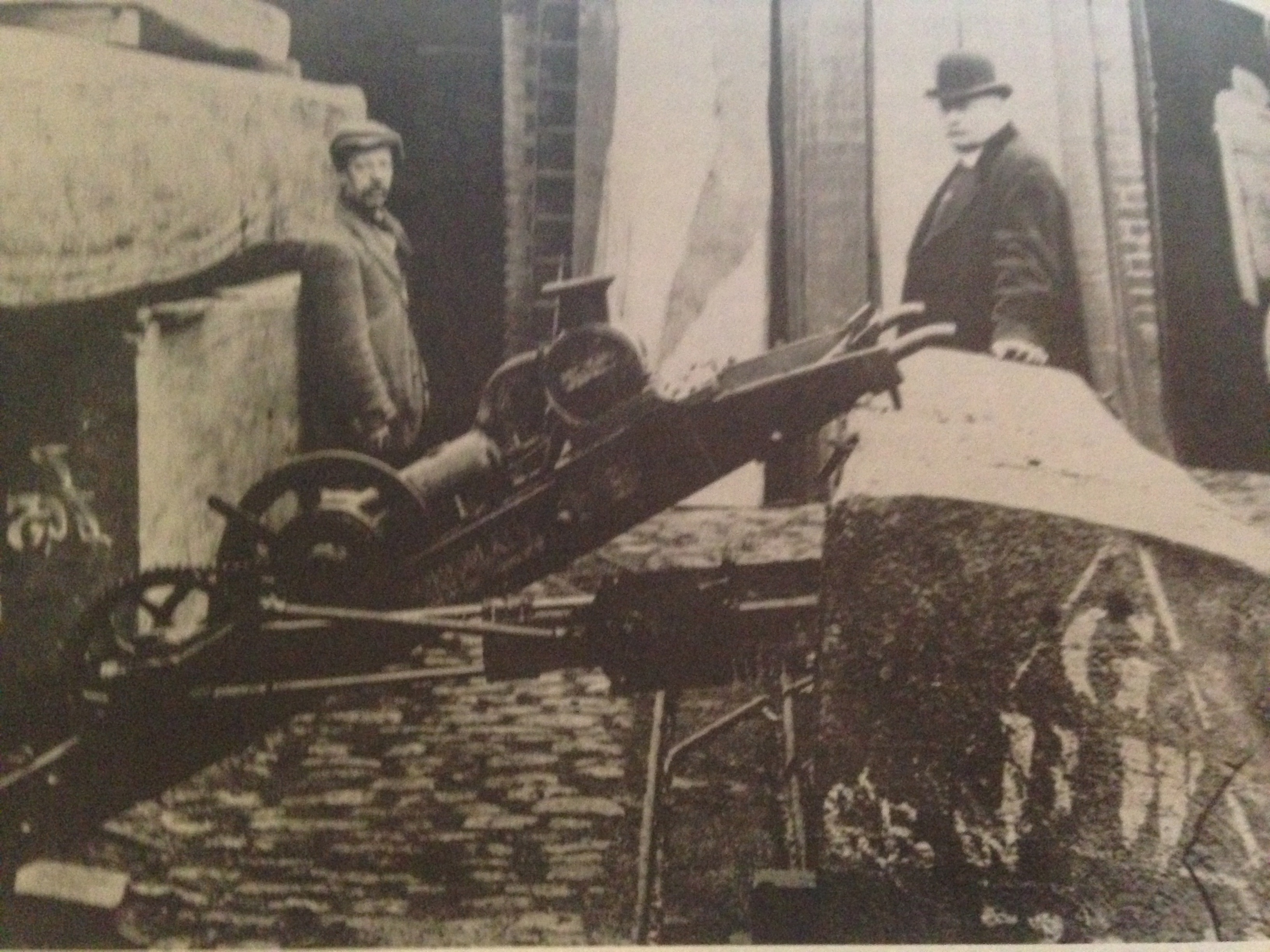
King George V looking at the Wade Drag Saw at the 1920 Royal Show in London

In 1929, upon the death of Edward J. Newbegin, his son Wade Newbegin became the President of the company, and remained so until 1991. During his time as president, the company distributed the Ford-Ferguson tractor throughout the Northwest, New Holland Farm Equipment, Howard Rotavators and Goulds pumps. During World War II, R.M. Wade & Co. focused primarily on manufacturing ship component parts, most notably for the Kaiser BB-3 Airplane Carrier as well as Kaiser ships and tugboats produced at Kaiser shipyard in Vancouver, Washington.

In 1937, the company established the Wade Rain Division, one of original irrigation companies in the United States. Wade Rain is currently operated by Edward Newbegin, Wade Newbegin's son.

== Recognition ==
In 1945, R.M. Wade & Co. won the Maritime M award for production excellence during World War II.

In 1979, Wade Newbegin won the Irrigation Association's Industry Achievement Award

In 1999, Edward Newbegin, great-grandson of R.M. Wade, was elected President of the Irrigation Association

== Academic scholarships ==
The R.M. Wade Foundation provides an annual scholarship for excellence in teaching at Oregon State University's College of Agricultural Sciences. It further provides academic scholarships for students enrolled in agricultural studies in the Pacific Northwest and Rocky Mountain region.

== Today ==
In 2004 the company was divided into two separate corporations. R.M. Wade is a distributor of agricultural equipment and a real estate holding company, while Wade Rain, based in Tualatin, Oregon, continues as an operating company selling irrigation and mining products, currently headed by Edward H. Newbegin and John Wade Newbegin.
