= German International School Portland =

School in Beaverton, Oregon, United States

Coordinates: 45.49149°N 122.82547°W

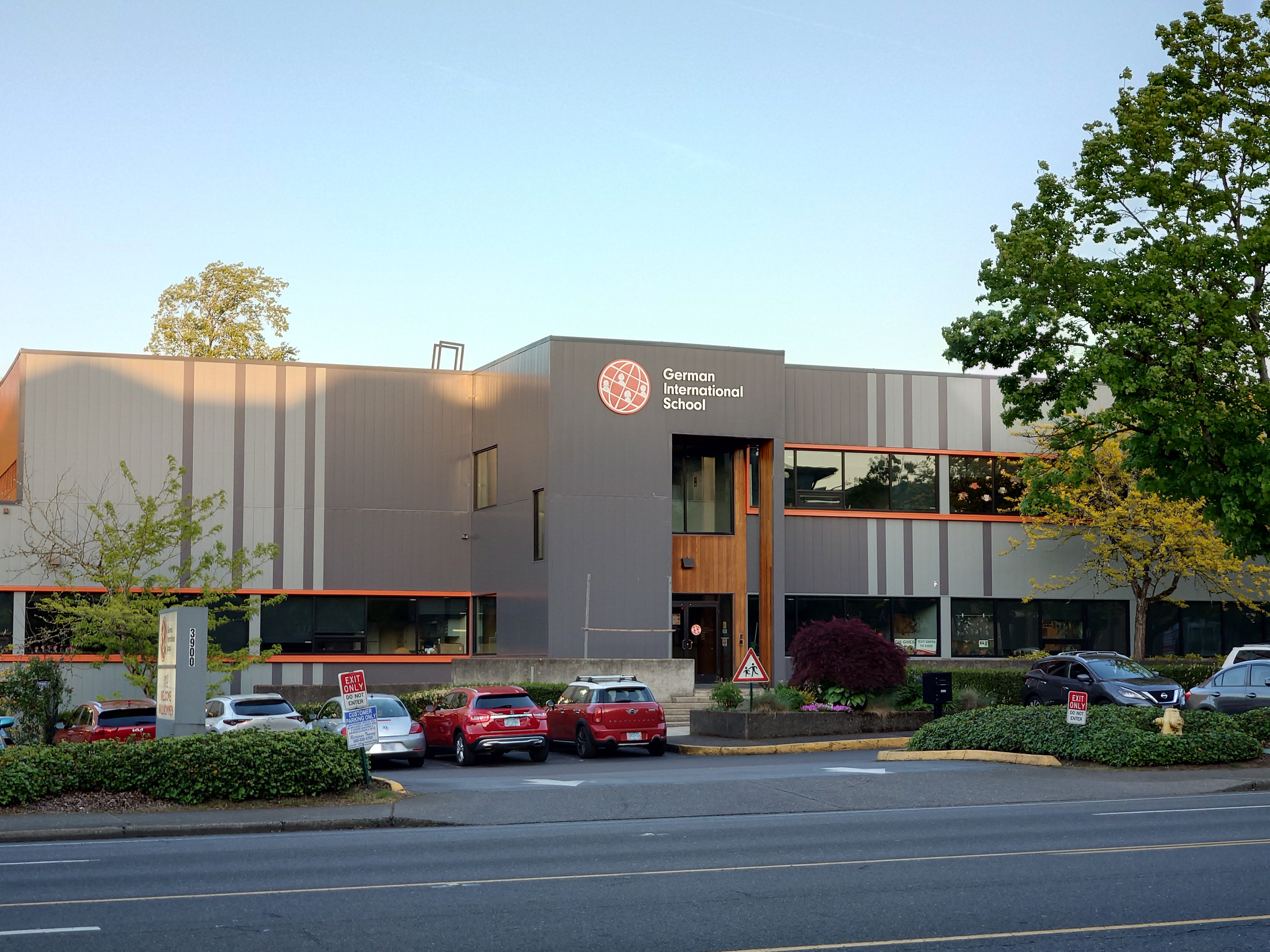
German International School in 2025

German International School Portland, formerly the German American School of Portland, is an independent International Baccalaureate (IB) World School in Beaverton, Oregon, in the Portland metropolitan area. Founded in 1995, the school serves students from age two through eighth grade and offers German immersion, Mandarin Chinese immersion, and an English middle-school track.

== History ==
German International School was established in Beaverton, Oregon, as a small elementary school with a focus on German-language instruction. For most of its history, the school served students through the elementary grades only. In 2023, following a decision by the school's board to expand its program, German International opened a middle school division, becoming a preschool-through-8th-grade institution. The middle school enrolled its first graduating class in the 2025–2026 academic year.

== Programs ==
German International School offers a range of programs spanning early childhood, K–8 day school, athletics, enrichment, and community language education for teens and adults.

== Curriculum ==
The school offers projects that are related to real-world issues; such as restoring local green spaces, meeting with community leaders, and designing solutions to environmental and civic challenges. Additionally, the school also offers music, visual arts, and International Baccalaureate classes.

== Campuses ==
German International School operates across three campuses in the Beaverton area:

In 2025–2026, the Middle School campus underwent a construction.

In 2011, the German-American School opened its SolarLab and solar panel displays to the public.
