= Millikan Way station =

Light rail station on the MAX Blue and Red lines in Beaverton, Oregon

Millikan Way
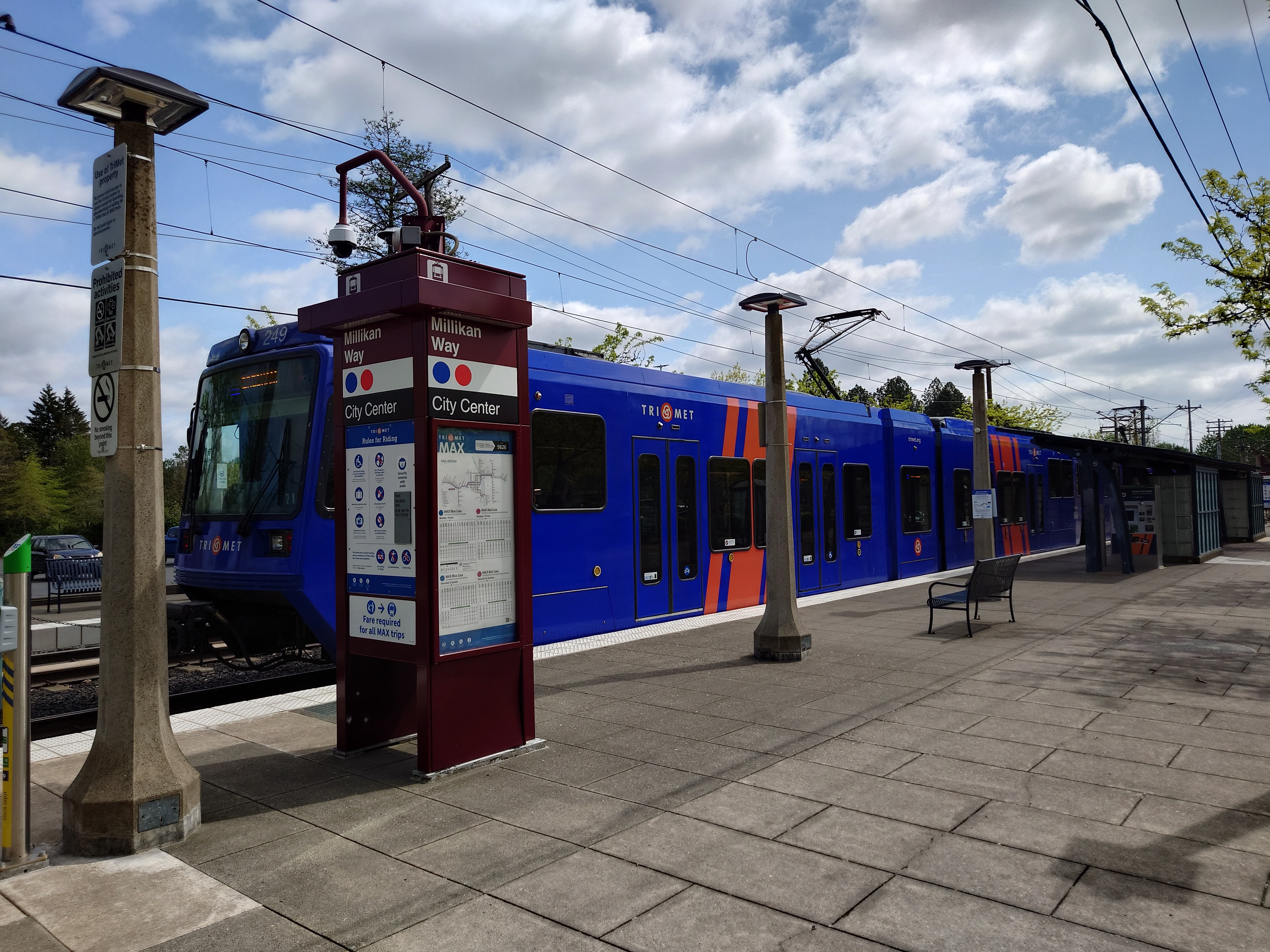

General information
- Location: SW Millikan Way & 141st Ave; Beaverton, Oregon; USA
- Coordinates: 45°29′43″N 122°49′17″W
- Owner: TriMet
- Platforms: 2 side platforms
- Tracks: 2
- Connections: TriMet: 53 (temporary), 62

Construction
- Parking: 400 park and ride spaces
- Cycle facilities: Racks and lockers
- Accessible: yes

History
- Opened: September 12, 1998

Services
Preceding station	TriMet	Following station
Beaverton Creek toward Hatfield Government Center	Blue Line	Beaverton Central toward Cleveland Ave
Beaverton Creek toward Hillsboro Airport/Fairgrounds	Red Line	Beaverton Central toward Portland Airport
Location

Millikan Way is a light rail station on the MAX Blue and Red lines in Beaverton, Oregon. It is the 8th stop westbound on the Westside MAX.

The station is located in the southern central part of the Tektronix Howard Vollum Campus. Other nearby business parks offer shuttle service to this station. One bus line serves this station and provides service to Washington Square Transit Center and Sunset Transit Center.

== Bus line connections ==
This station is served by the following bus line:

- 53 – Arctic/Allen (temporary reroute during Beaverton Transit Center construction)
- 62 – Murray Blvd
