= The Round (Beaverton, Oregon) =

Mixed-use development in Beaverton, Oregon, U.S.

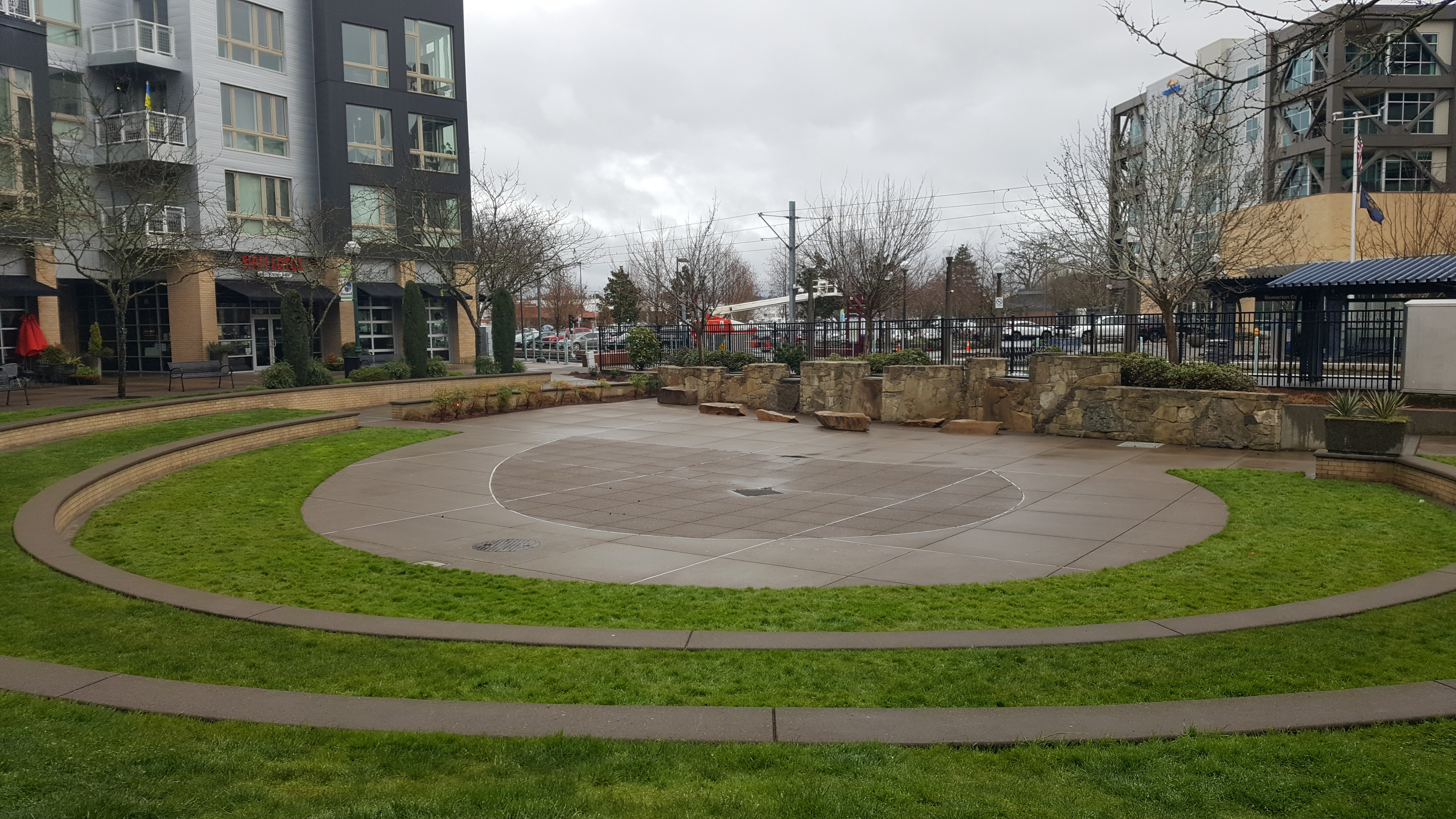
- Sunken plaza, 2022
- Coordinates: 45°29′27″N 122°48′26″W

The Round (also known as The Round at Beaverton Central) is a mixed-use development surrounding the Beaverton Central station in Beaverton, Oregon, United States. Nearby features include BG's Food Cartel and the Patricia Reser Center for the Arts.
