= Veterans Memorial Park (Beaverton, Oregon) =

Public park in Beaverton, Oregon, U.S.

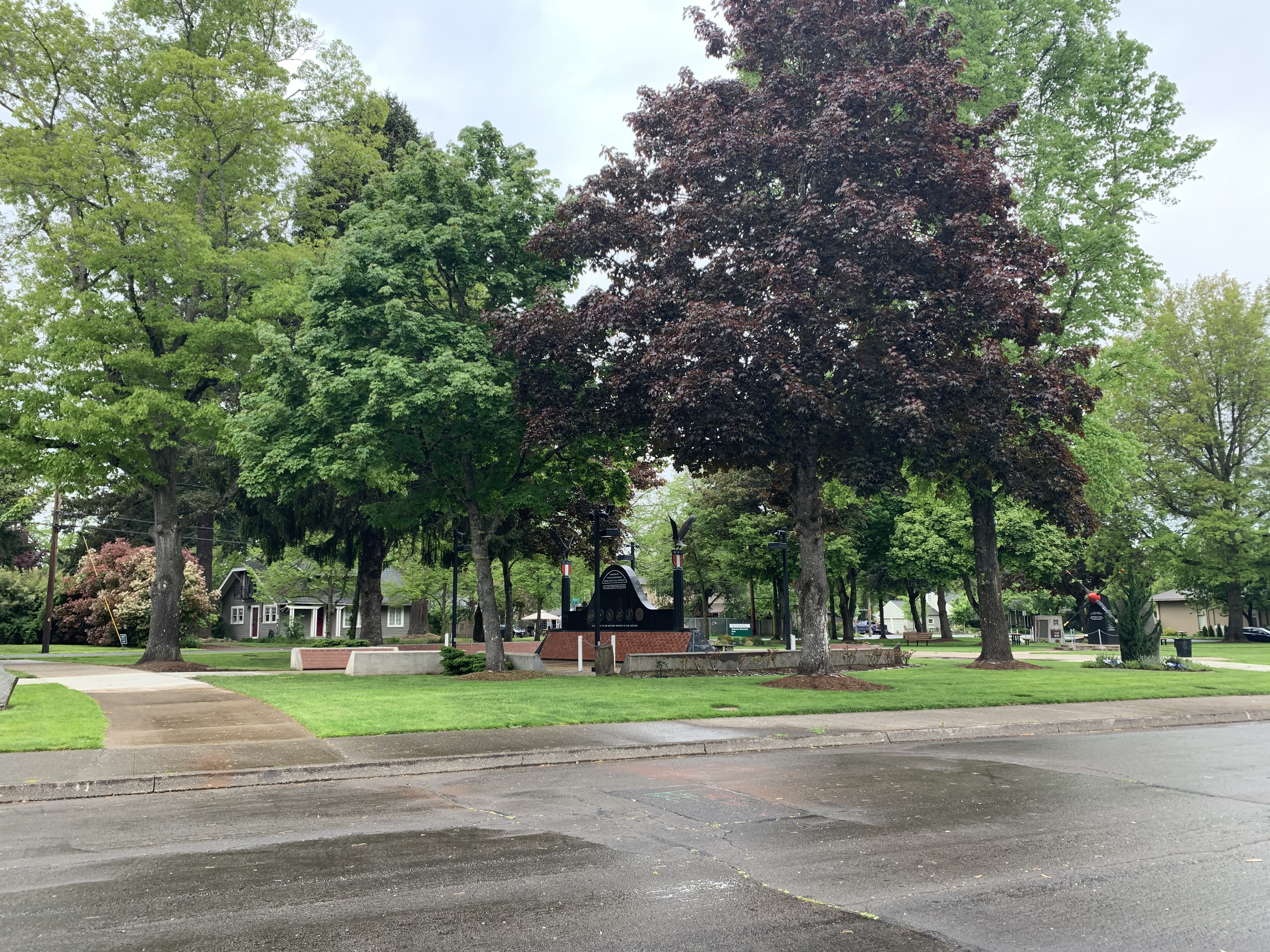
- The park in 2020

- Location within Oregon
- Location: Beaverton, Oregon, U.S.
- Coordinates: 45°28′54″N 122°48′24″W

Veterans Memorial Park is a park located in Beaverton, Oregon, United States. The Beaverton American Legion Post #124 hosts Memorial Day and Veterans Day ceremonies at the park annually.

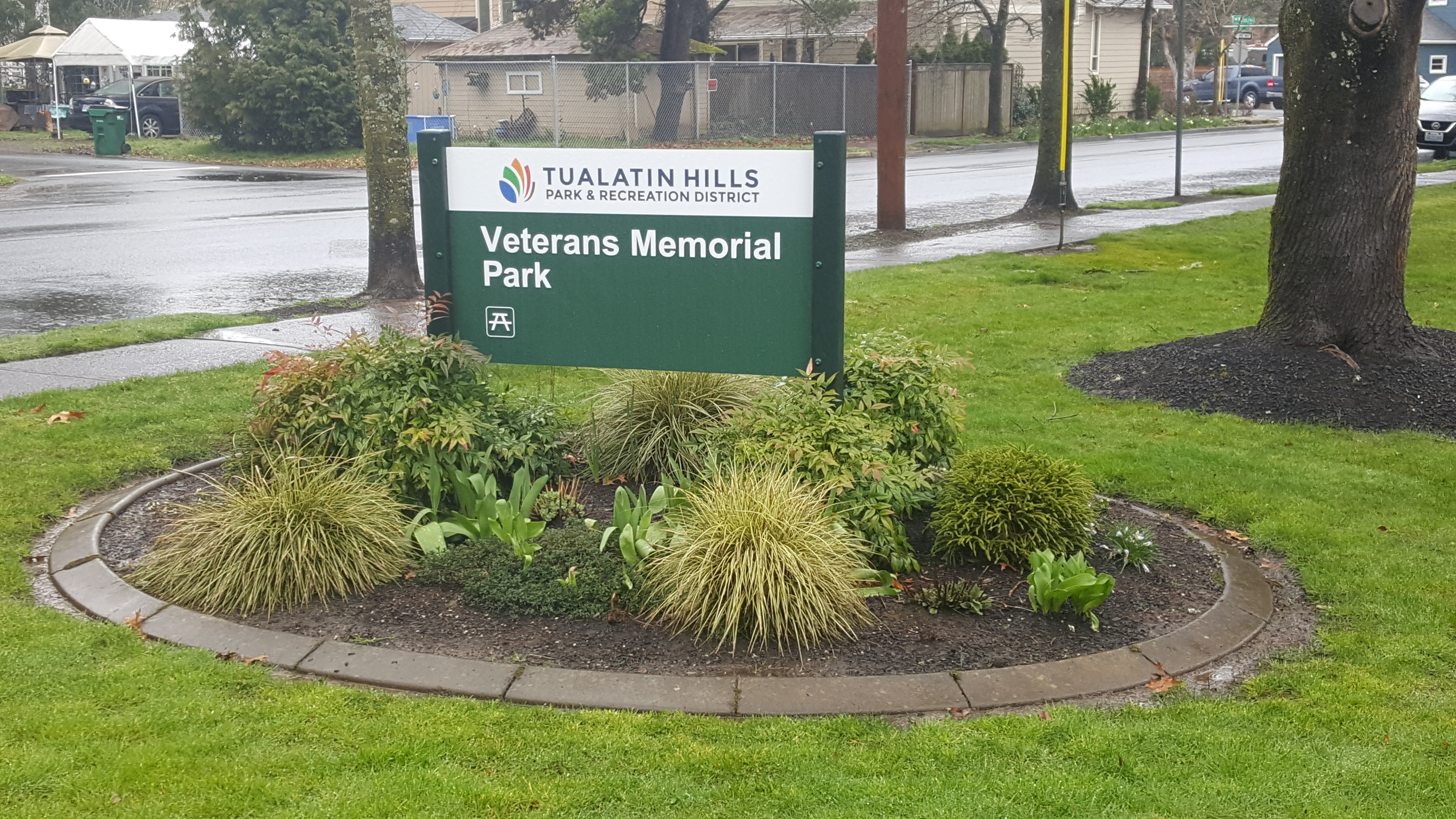
Park sign

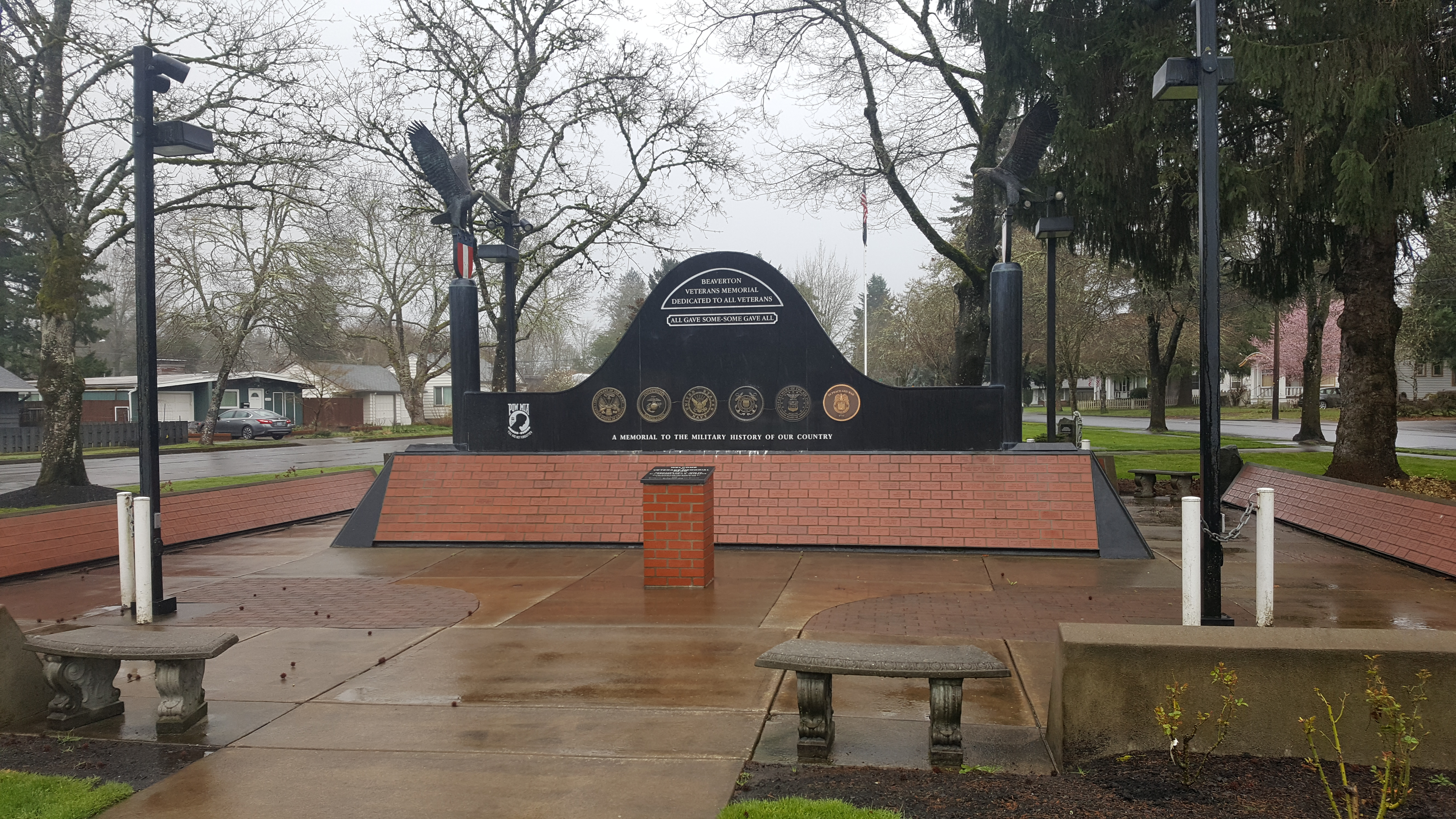
Beaverton Veterans Memorial

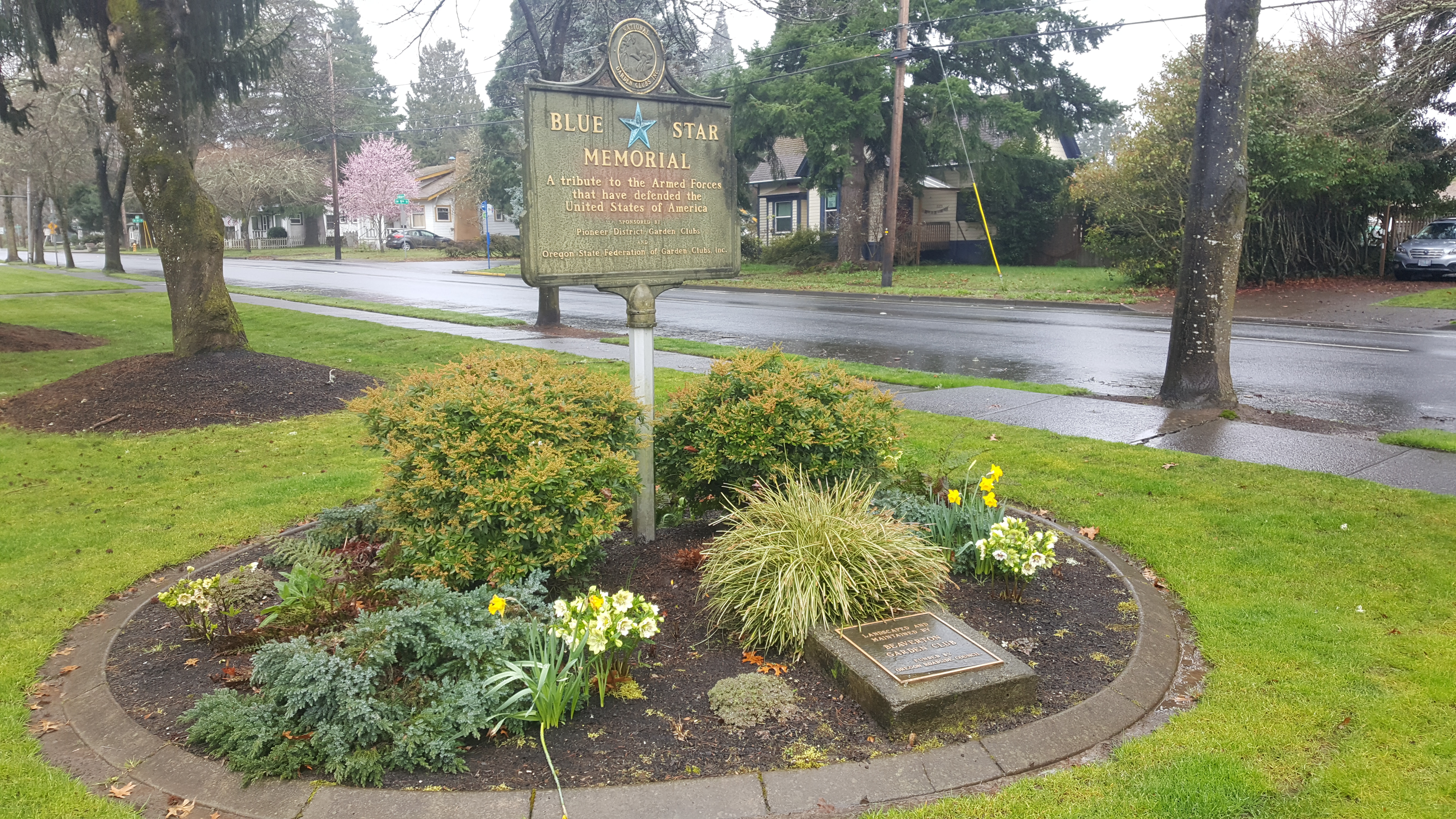
Blue Star Memorial sign

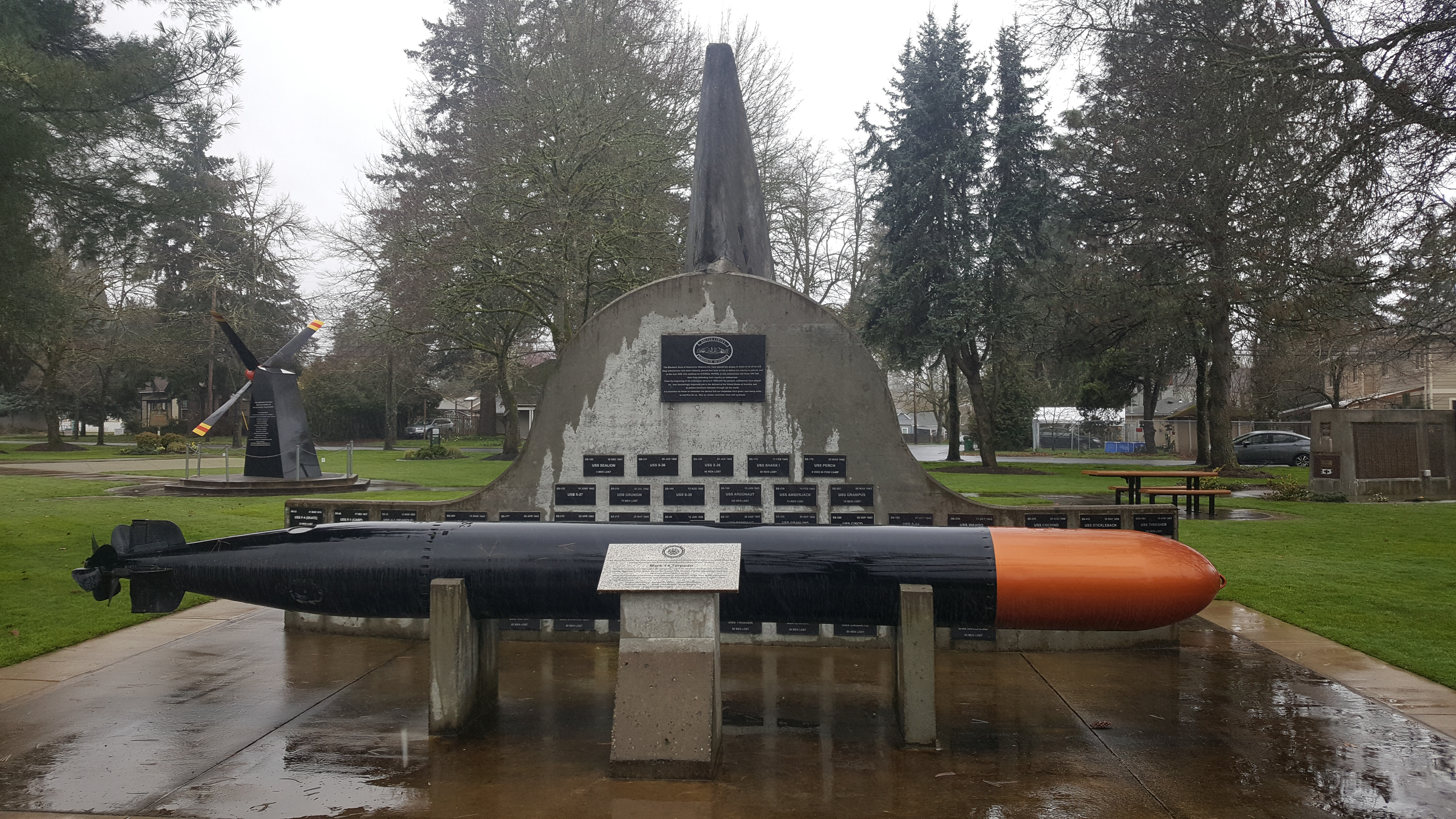
Mark 14 Torpedo

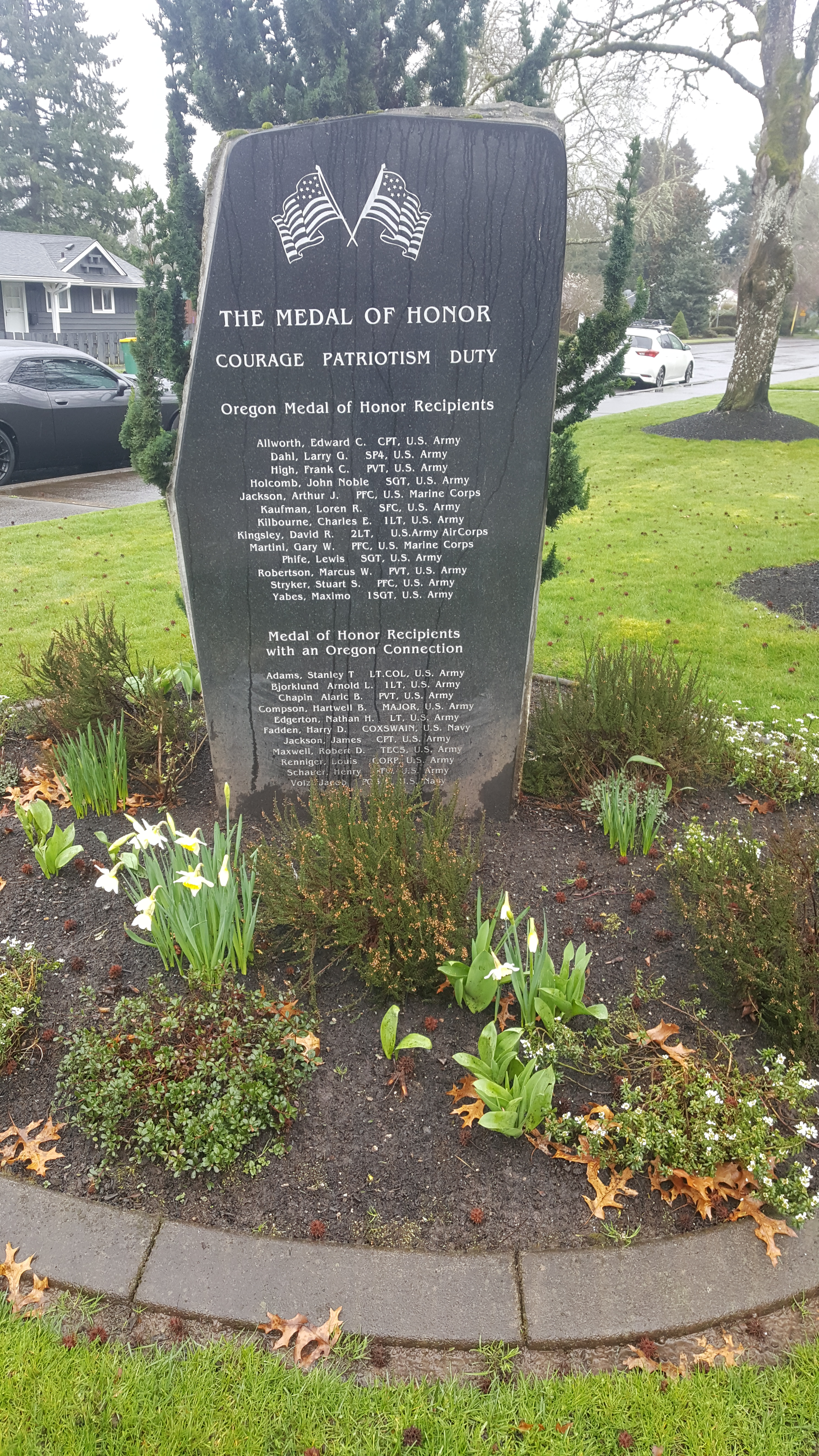
Monument commemorating Oregon Medal of Honor recipients

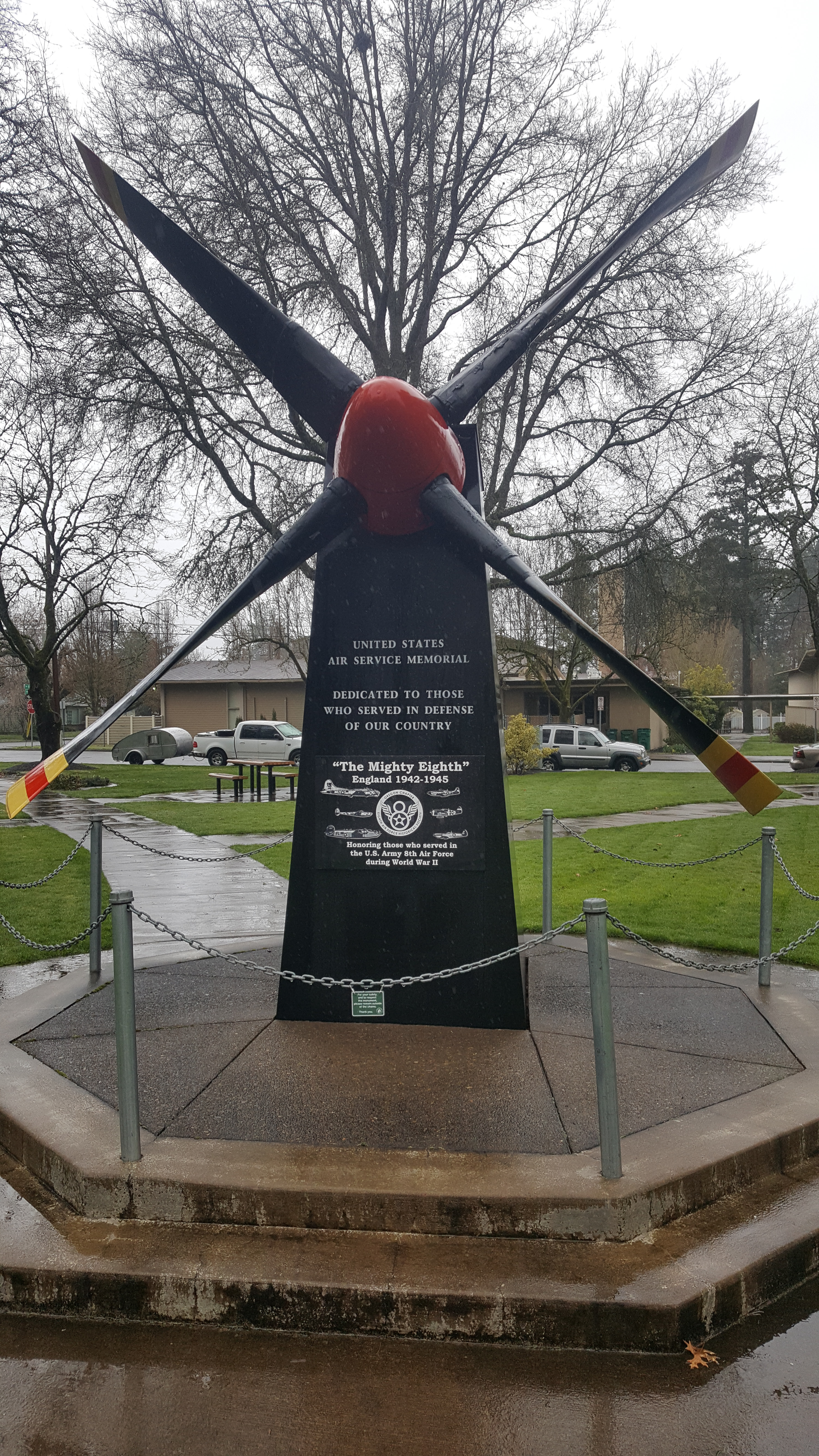
United States Air Service Memorial

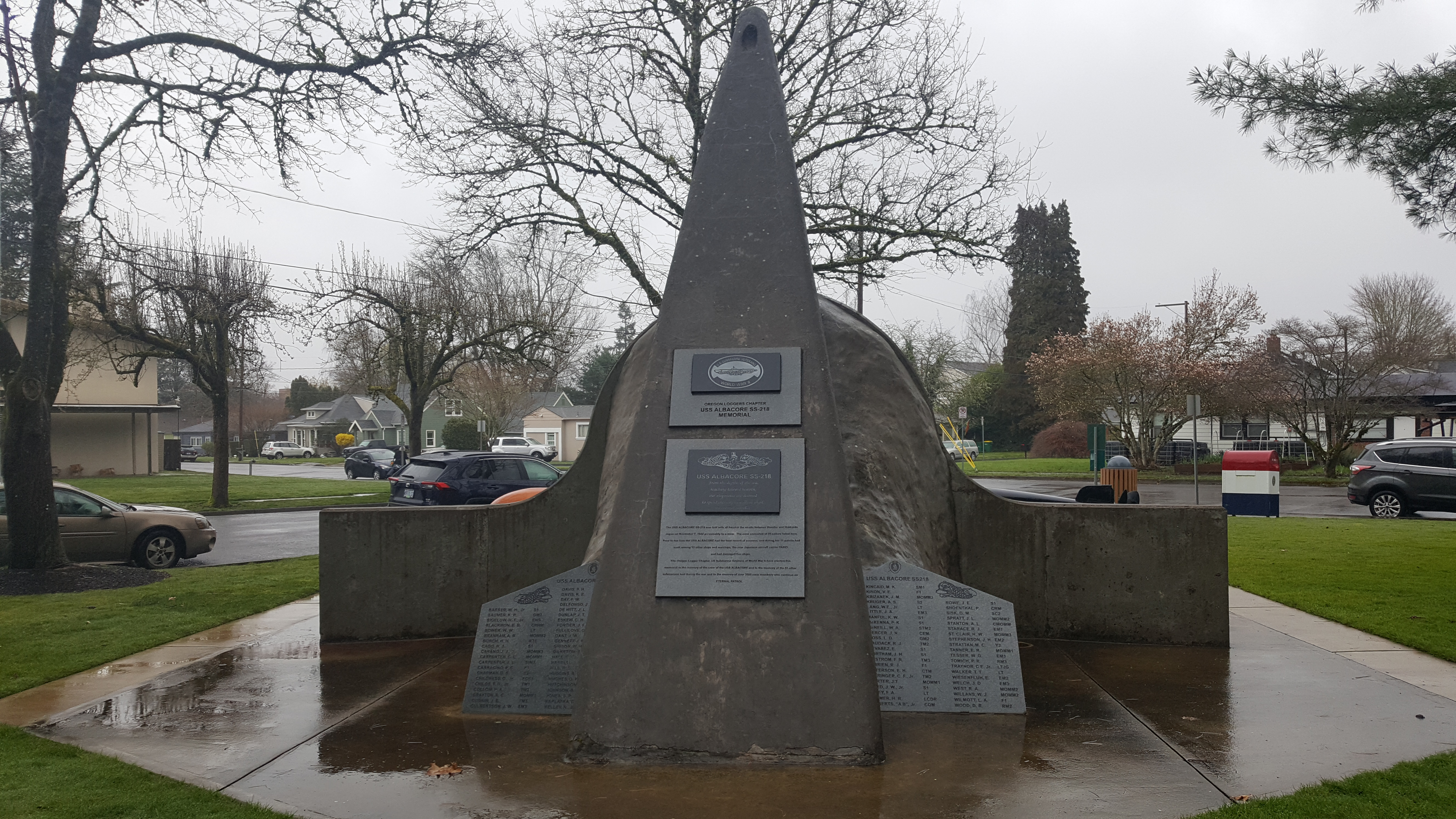
USS Albacore (SS-218) Memorial

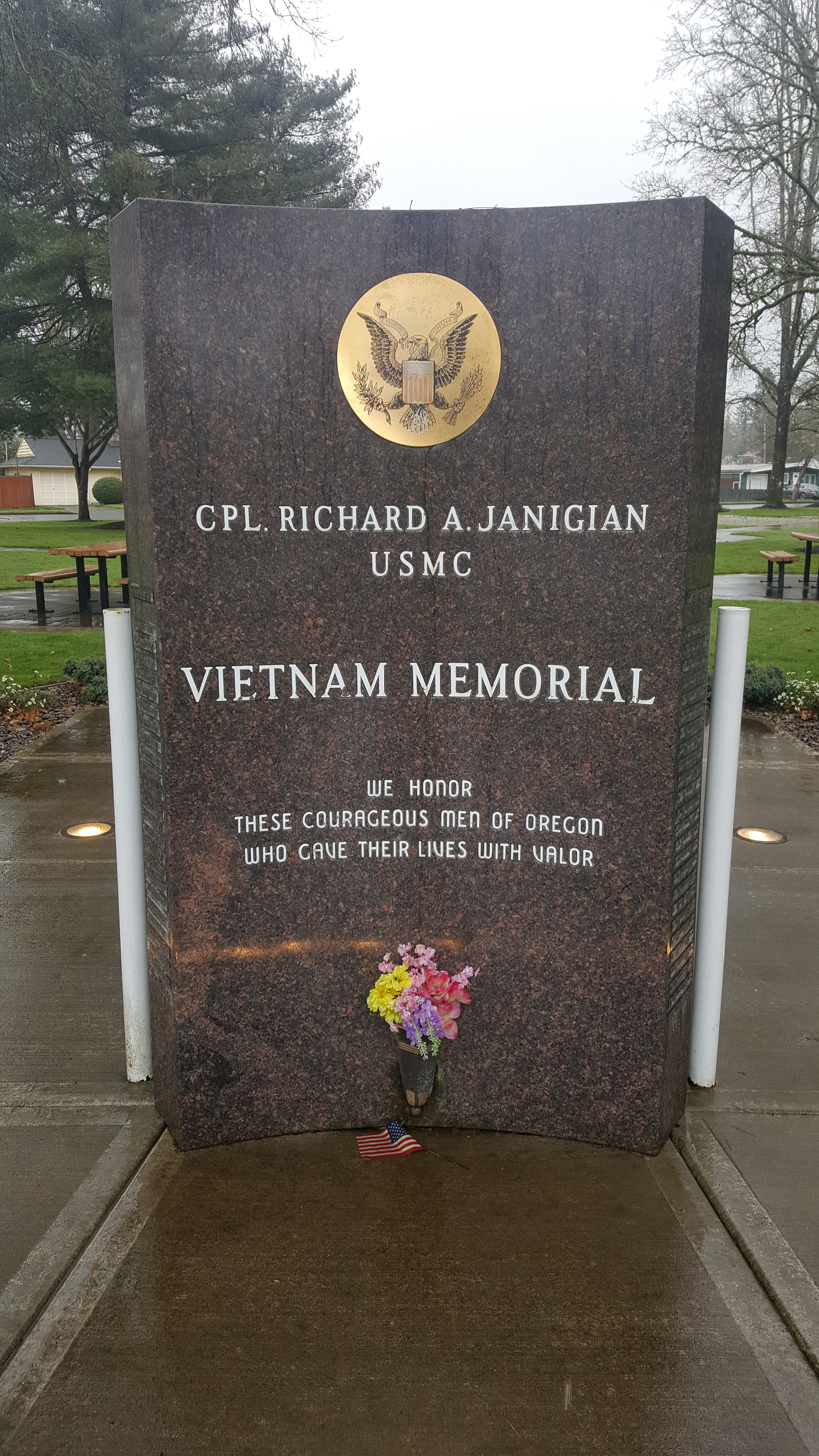
Vietnam Memorial
