= Cooper Mountain (Oregon) =

Mountain in Oregon, United States

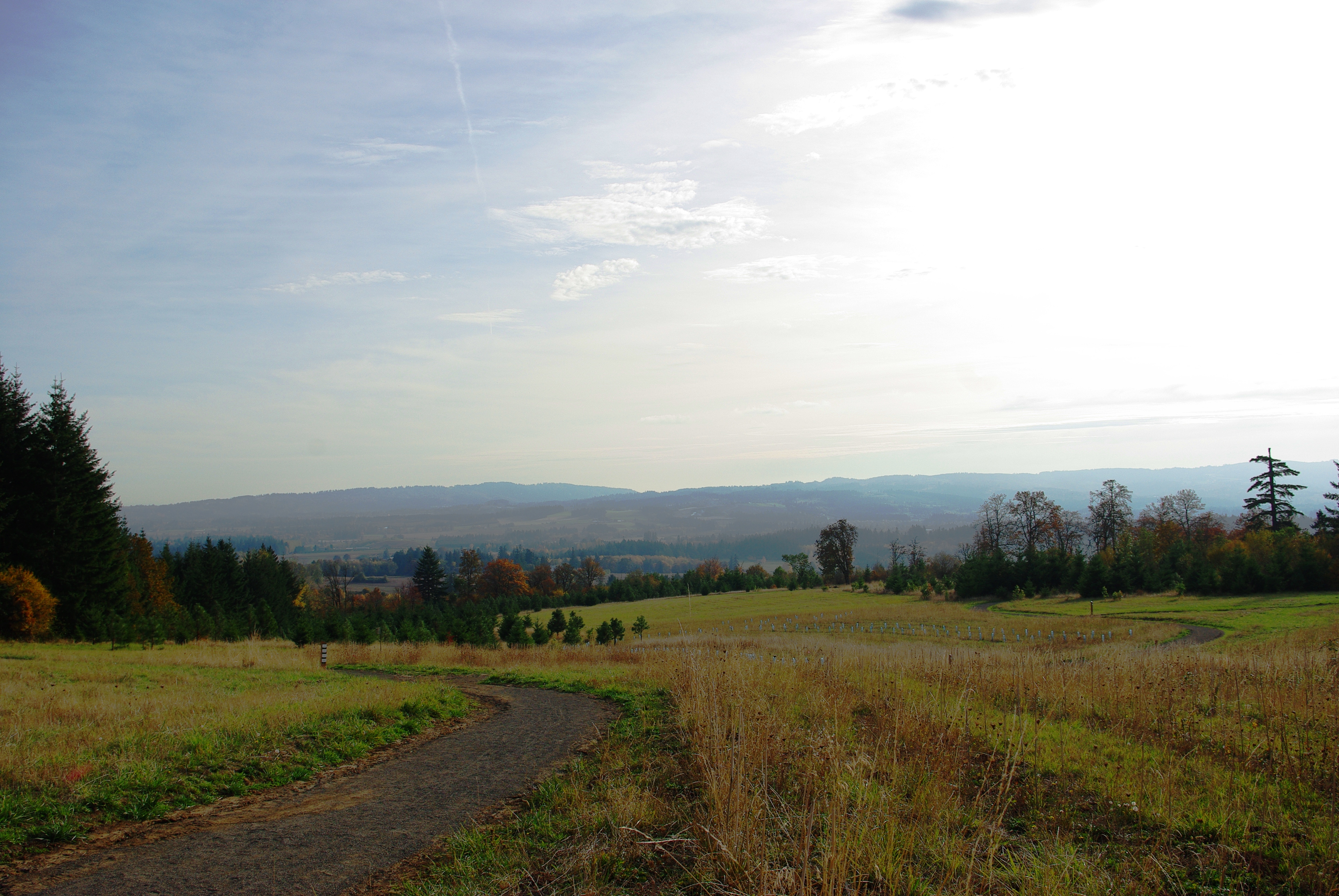
- From top of mountain looking south

Highest point
- Elevation: 764 ft (233 m) NAVD 88
- Prominence: 603 ft (184 m)
- Coordinates: 45°27′17″N 122°52′21″W

Geography
- Location within Oregon
- Location: Washington County, Oregon, U.S.
- Parent range: Oregon Coast Range
- Topo map: USGS Beaverton

Cooper Mountain is a summit in Washington County, Oregon, United States. Its summit has an elevation of 764 feet (233 m). The mountain and surrounding area are named for Ohio immigrant Perry Cooper who settled on the mountain.

== Namesakes ==
- Cooper Mountain Nature Park
- Cooper Mountain Vineyards
- Cooper Mountain Elementary School outside Beaverton
- Cooper Mountain Presbyterian Church in Aloha
- Cooper Mountain Evangelical Cemetery
- Cooper Mountain Cemetery
- Cooper Park in Aloha, Oregon
