= Metro West Ambulance =

Emergency service in Oregon, US

- Founded: 1953
- Founder: James D. Fuiten
- Headquarters: 45°32′42″N 122°55′36″W, Hillsboro, Oregon, United States
- Area served: Oregon Coast
- Services: Medical transport
- Website: www.metrowest.fm

Metro West Ambulance is an ambulance company based in the U.S. state of Oregon with ambulances and wheelie vans along the Oregon Coast (under the names Pacific West Ambulance, Bay Cities Ambulance, and Medix Ambulance). Metro West also manages the Vernonia Volunteer Ambulance Association. In addition to daily emergency ambulance services, Metro West also serves customers through a comprehensive wheelchair van service, special event medical support for Portland's Moda Center, the Oregon State Fair, and many other events throughout the year. Metro West also offers community medical and preparedness training with Education for Life through the American Heart Association.

== Accreditation ==
Metro West Ambulance is accredited through the Commission on Accreditation of Ambulance Services.

== Competitive bidding ==
In 1996, Metro West Ambulance competed for the Washington County medical transport contract.

In 1997 Metro West won the Washington County, Oregon contract for 9-1-1 dispatch.

In 2006, Clackamas County, Oregon accepted a no-bid contract from Metro West competitor AMR over objections. Metro West was not present during the final discussions.

In 2007, unionized medics for area ambulance companies approved a strike. Their chief complaint centered on pay and benefits, with their company being compared to Metro West.

In 2008, Metro West lost a bid for BLS transports in Eugene, Oregon. Later, in 2015, Metro West won the Eugene/Springfield BLS transport contract, and began service on February 1, 2015.

== See also ==
- American Medical Response
- American Heart Association
