= Beaverton Central station =

Light rail station in Beaverton, Oregon, U.S.

Beaverton Central
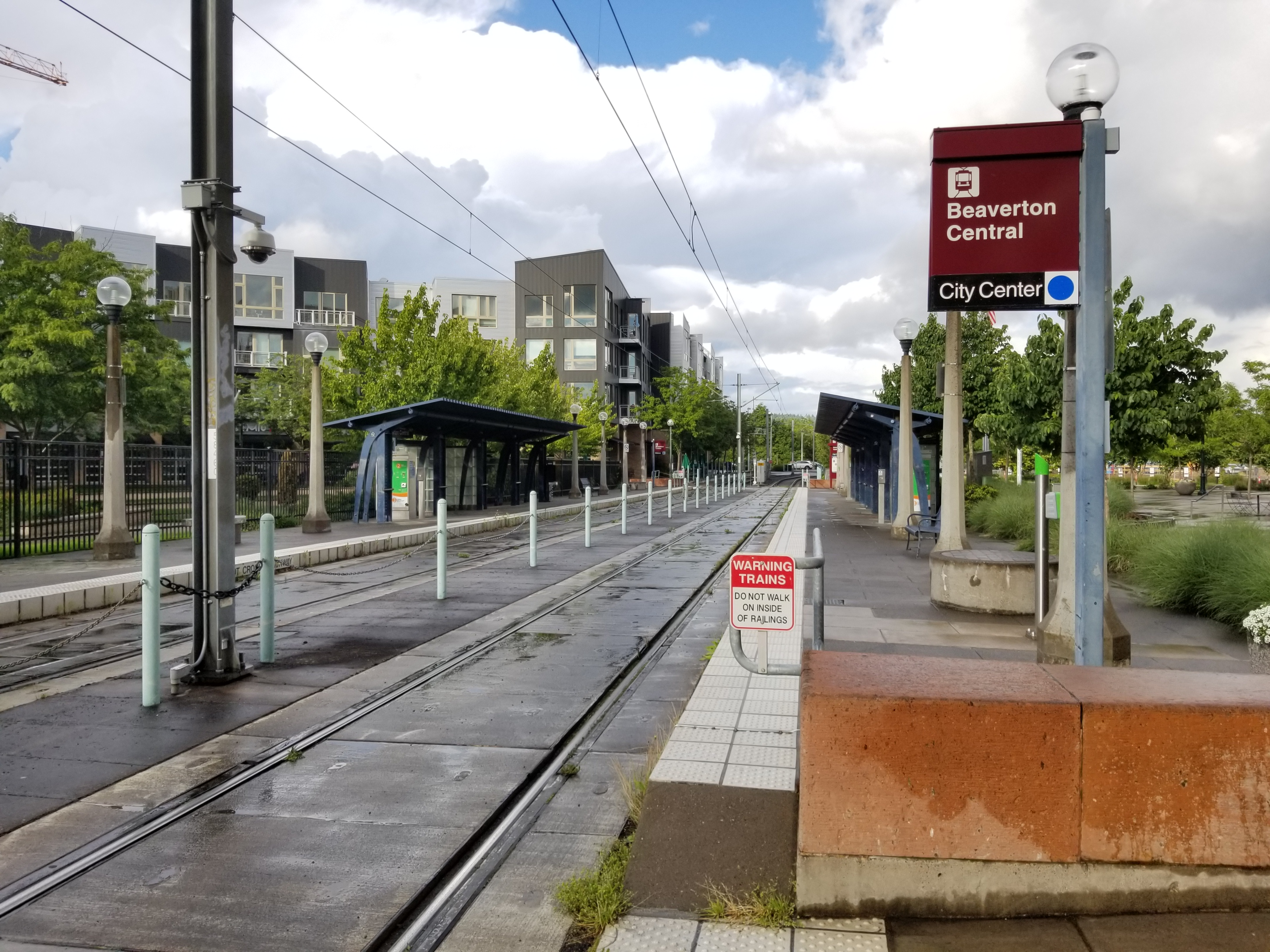
- Station from the west

General information
- Location: SW Hall Blvd north of Canyon Rd; Beaverton, Oregon; USA
- Coordinates: 45°29′26″N 122°48′25″W
- Owner: TriMet
- Platforms: 2 side platforms
- Tracks: 2

Construction
- Parking: none
- Accessible: yes

History
- Opened: September 12, 1998

Passengers
- Fall 2025: 1,918 (average weekday)
- Rank: 23 of 94

Services
| Preceding station | TriMet | Following station |
|---|---|---|
| Millikan Way toward Hatfield Government Center | Blue Line | Beaverton Transit Center toward Cleveland Ave |
| Millikan Way toward Hillsboro Airport/Fairgrounds | Red Line | Beaverton Transit Center toward Portland Airport |
Location

Beaverton Central is a light rail station in Beaverton, Oregon, United States, served by TriMet as part of MAX Light Rail. Situated between Millikan Way and Beaverton Transit Center, it is the 13th station eastbound on the Blue Line and the ninth station eastbound on the Red Line.

The station, located near Beaverton's downtown area, is surrounded by a mixed-use development, The Round at Beaverton Central, the present location of the main offices of The Linux Foundation, previously the Open Source Development Labs. In March 2011, TriMet received a federal grant to pay for the installation of security cameras at the station.

== History ==
=== Transit-oriented development ===
The Round is a high-density, mixed-use development that was intended to recreate the lost historical city center of Beaverton. Despite the involvement of 12 different agencies, the developer was unable to obtain sufficient financing, and the project had to be downsized to nearly half of the originally planned density.

== Services ==
Beaverton Central station is served by the Blue and Red lines of MAX Light Rail. It is the 13th station eastbound on the Blue Line and the ninth station eastbound on the Red Line, situated between Millikan Way station and Beaverton Transit Center.
