= Milwaukie branch =

Railway line in Oregon, United States

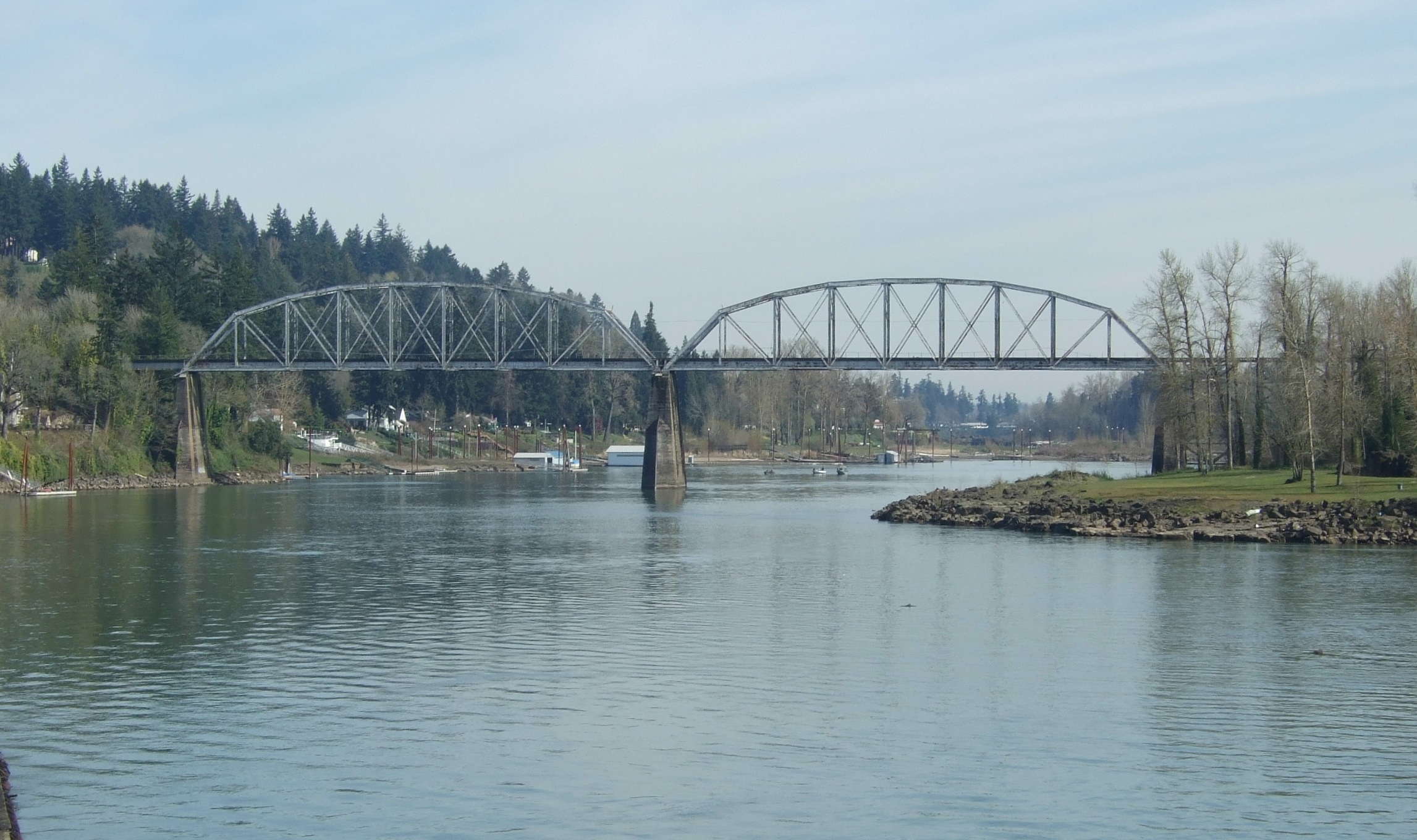
- The Lake Oswego Railroad Bridge carries the branch over the Willamette River

Overview
- Owner: Union Pacific Railroad
- Locale: Clackamas County, Oregon

Service
- Operator: Portland and Western Railroad

History
- Opened: July 10, 1910; 116 years ago

Technical
- Line length: 3.2 mi (5.1 km)
- Track gauge: 1,435 mm (4 ft 8 1/2 in) standard gauge

The Milwaukie branch is a railway line in Clackamas County, Oregon, in the United States. It connects the Union Pacific Railroad's Brooklyn Subdivision and Newberg branch. It was originally built in 1910 by the Beaverton and Willsburg Railroad, a subsidiary of the Southern Pacific Transportation Company. The Portland and Western Railroad operates the line.

== Route ==
The Milwaukie branch begins at Willsboro Junction on the Brooklyn Subdivision in Milwaukie, Oregon. The MAX Orange Line crosses on a viaduct almost immediately, and the two lines proceed side-by-side into Milwaukie proper. South of the Milwaukie/Main Street station and after crossing Kellogg Creek the two separate, with the Milwaukie branch continuing southwest and the MAX Orange Line turning southeast toward its terminus at Southeast Park Avenue station.

The Milwaukie branch passes Elk Rock Island and follows the Willamette River before crossing it, using the Lake Oswego Railroad Bridge. On the west bank of the Willamette the line travels a short distance before connecting with the Newberg branch in Lake Oswego, Oregon.

== History ==
The Beaverton and Willsburg Railroad, a subsidiary of the Southern Pacific Transportation Company, constructed the Milwaukie branch as part of a new cutoff connecting the Southern Pacific's lines in the Portland area. The new line opened on July 17, 1910. The line handled trains to and from Tillamook, Oregon, and was sometimes, along with the Tigard branch and West Side branch, considered part of the Tillamook branch.

In 1995 the new Portland and Western Railroad leased several branches from the Southern Pacific, including the Milwaukie branch. These leases continued when the Southern Pacific merged with the Union Pacific Railroad. The Portland and Western Railroad groups the line with part of the Newberg branch as the Willsburg District.
