= WES Commuter Rail =

Commuter rail service in Oregon, United States

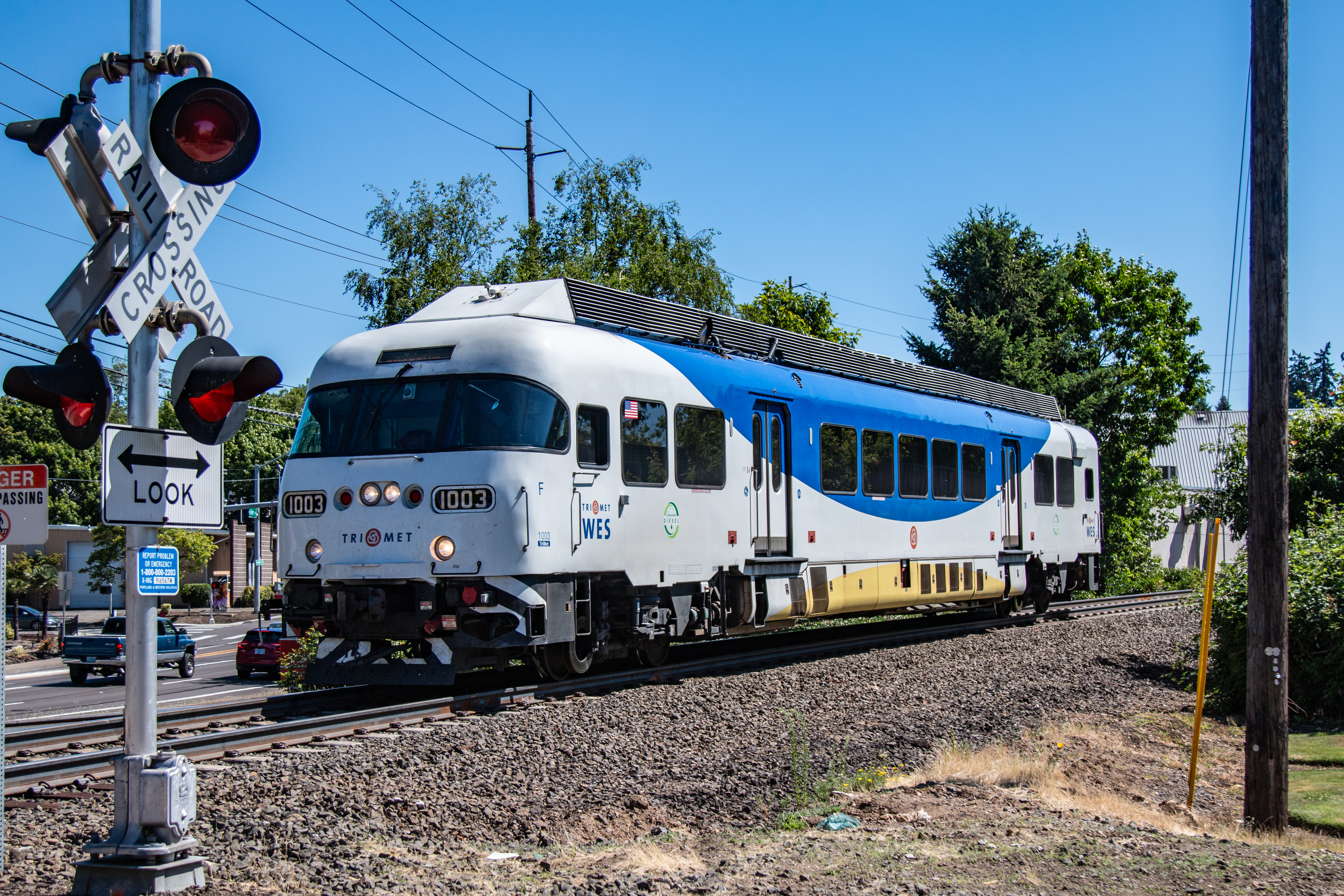
- A WES car in Tualatin

Overview
- Other name(s): Washington County Commuter Rail Project; Wilsonville to Beaverton Commuter Rail Project
- Owner: TriMet
- Locale: Portland metropolitan area, Oregon, U.S.
- Termini: Beaverton Transit Center (north); Wilsonville (south)
- Stations: 5
- Website: trimet.org/wes

Service
- Type: Commuter rail
- Operator: Portland & Western Railroad
- Rolling stock: Colorado Railcar Aero, Budd Rail Diesel Car
- Daily ridership: 500 (weekdays, Q2 2026)
- Ridership: 125,400 (2025)

History
- Opened: February 2, 2009

Technical
- Line length: 14.7 mi (23.7 km)
- Character: At-grade
- Track gauge: 4 ft 8 1/2 in (1,435 mm) standard gauge
- Operating speed: 37 mph (60 km/h); 60 mph (97 km/h) top speed

The Westside Express Service (WES) is a commuter rail line serving parts of the Portland metropolitan area's Washington and Clackamas counties in the U.S. state of Oregon. Owned by TriMet and operated by the Portland & Western Railroad (P&W), it travels 14.7 miles (23.7 km) between Beaverton and Wilsonville along a route just west of Oregon Highway 217 (OR 217) and Interstate 5 (I-5). The line serves five stations and connects with MAX Light Rail at Beaverton Transit Center. Service operates on a 45-minute headway on weekdays during the morning and evening rush hours. In spring 2022, WES saw a daily ridership of 420 passengers or about 109,000 riders annually.

Local officials in Washington County began studying the feasibility of an intercity commuter rail service in 1996, and the Washington County Commuter Rail Project acquired approval from affected jurisdictions in 2002. Construction commenced in 2006 and it opened on February 2, 2009. From the start of the first serious discussions of the idea, it took thirteen years and $166 million to get WES operational.

== History ==
=== Background ===
The route presently used by WES consists of two historically separate railroads. The segment between Greton (near Tigard) and Wilsonville was originally built by the Oregon Electric Railway in 1908; at Greton the line continued northeasterly to Portland, a route that was abandoned in the mid-1930s. The Oregon Electric stopped running passenger trains in the late 1930s and soon after switched to diesel locomotives, continuing to run freight trains to Beaverton and Portland to the north, and to Salem, Albany and Eugene to the south.

The Tigard branch from Greton to Beaverton was built by the Beaverton and Willsburg Railroad, an affiliate of Southern Pacific, beginning in 1906, and opened to traffic in 1910. This route connected with Southern Pacific's existing west-east West Side branch in Beaverton that provided service to Portland and Hillsboro, and a second route south of Tigard to Cook, which was a junction with the Newberg branch between Lake Oswego and McMinnville. In 1914, the Southern Pacific electrified these lines as part of its Red Electric service in competition with the Oregon Electric Railway; by 1929 the Southern Pacific ended electric service, and passenger service was switched first to steam trains and doodlebugs, and later buses.

Both the Southern Pacific and the Oregon Electric (and its successor Burlington Northern) continued to provide freight service on the line until the 1990s when both railroads leased its low-density branches to shortline operators. In this case, the Southern Pacific leased its lines to newly formed Portland & Western Railroad in August 1995; followed by the Burlington Northern leasing its lines to the Portland & Western in October 1995. This put the operations of two competing railroads in the same hands for the first time in history.

=== Planning and funding ===
Led by Washington County, planning for WES began in 1996, when county officials started working with the cities of Beaverton, Tigard, Tualatin, Wilsonville and Sherwood, as well as government transportation agencies to study the idea of establishing passenger rail service between Beaverton and Wilsonville on the existing Portland & Western line. TriMet took over as the project's lead planning agency in 2002. After years of delays due to lack of funding, the project received approval from the Federal Transit Administration in May 2004, resulting in the funding of approximately 50 percent of the line's capital costs.

=== Construction, delays, and opening ===
Construction began October 23, 2006, in Wilsonville, and a ceremonial "ground-breaking" was held two days later in Tigard, although the project had already started and no dirt was moved.

During planning and construction, the project was called the Washington County Commuter Rail, or alternately the Wilsonville to Beaverton Commuter Rail since much of Wilsonville is in Clackamas County. TriMet held a naming contest to choose a name for the new line, and in November 2007 it announced WES (Westside Express Service) as the winner. By December of that year, construction on the rail line was 75 percent complete and included five new bridges and two rehabilitated bridges, and improvements to 14 miles (23 km) of track and 14 road crossings. A distinctive feature of the line is the gauntlet track sections installed at the three intermediate stations (Hall-Nimbus, Tigard and Tualatin). The feature allows freight trains to swing clear of the high-level platforms at the stops, so that wider cars do not strike them.

In June 2008, the line was more than 90 percent complete, with all the track in place. The four Colorado Railcar Diesel multiple unit (DMU) cars ordered for the line then arrived; a total of three powered DMU cars and one non-powered "trailer car" were tested on the route. A ceremonial inaugural run for dignitaries and journalists took place on January 22, and public preview rides on January 30, ahead of a February 2, 2009, public opening.

Originally scheduled to open in September 2008, opening was delayed several times and eventually to February 2009 due to technical and other difficulties, most notably the failure of Colorado Railcar (CR). TriMet lost $3 million from the delays and from its financial support of CR, which included paying CR's suppliers and providing "rail engineering expertise and on-site technical assistance." They provided bailout funds to CR, paying rent, phone, and power bills, and ultimately taking control of the failing company long enough to take delivery of its vehicles.

A six-week naming contest was held for the new service with more than 1,700 entries submitted. The winning name, "WES" for "Westside Express Service", was revealed in a ceremony on November 19, 2007.

=== Proposed extension to Salem ===
In April 2010, the Rail Division of the Oregon Department of Transportation (ODOT) published a study for a potential southern extension of WES from Wilsonville to Salem. The study extended 29 miles (47 km) and proposed stations in Woodburn, Keizer, and either North Salem or Central Salem. As of 2017, there have been no plans to expand WES service, owing to low ridership, but lawmakers have attempted to revisit the plan. In 2022, the city of Wilsonville revealed legislative concepts that included several service improvements to the WES commuter rail line including the Salem extension. In February 2024, SB 1572 was released, which if passed would require ODOT and other Oregon rail transit agencies to study the possibility of a Salem extension. In 2025, House Bill 3453 was released. This new bill, if fully passed and made into law, would create a separate entity, the Westside Express Service Authority (WESA), that would take over WES commuter rail service from TriMet and allow for increased service along the current line. The bill would then allow for a possible Salem extension and even Eugene. On June 27, 2025, the regular legislative session "adjourned sine die", with HB 3453 "in committee past adjournment".

== Route ==
WES trains run between Wilsonville and Beaverton during morning and afternoon rush hours, weekdays only, and until 2020 they operated every 30 minutes. Service reductions implemented early in the COVID-19 pandemic reduced the frequency to every 45 minutes starting April 5, 2020, and in fall 2025 the service level remains at the reduced level.

The scheduled one-way travel time is 27 minutes. For its first 3 1/2 years of service, the WES line was located entirely within TriMet fare zone 3, but travel on WES required a TriMet "All-Zone" (three-zone) fare, rather than a one-zone or two-zone fare. However, effective September 2012, TriMet discontinued all use of fare zones, and WES fares consequently became identical to the fares on any other TriMet rail or bus line. C-Tran all-zone day and monthly passes are also accepted as valid fare on WES. P&W, which continues to run freight trains on the line, operates the commuter trains, and TriMet maintains them.

=== Stations ===
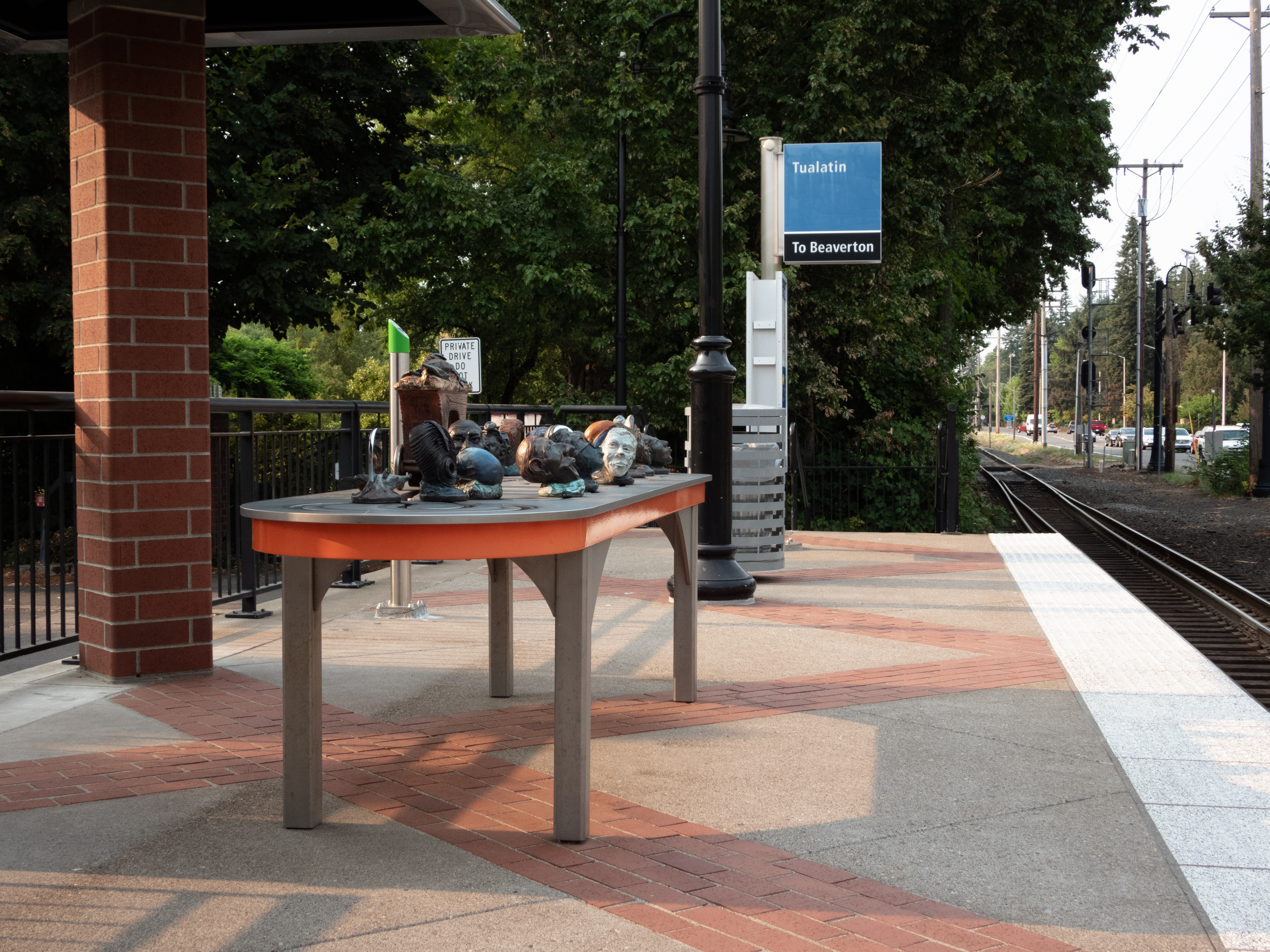
The Tualatin Interactivator

WES serves stations in Wilsonville, Tualatin, Tigard, and at two locations in Beaverton. At Beaverton Transit Center—the line's northern terminus—commuters are able to transfer between WES and either of two light rail lines of MAX Light Rail: the Blue Line, which serves the Hillsboro–Gresham corridor via downtown Portland, and the Red Line, which connects to Portland International Airport via downtown Portland and runs west to Hillsboro Airport. Beaverton Transit Center also facilitates connections to 11 TriMet bus lines. Hall/Nimbus Station, the second stop in Beaverton, is served by local TriMet bus lines 76 and 78 and has about 50 park-and-ride spaces. The station is within walking distance of Washington Square Mall and Nimbus Business Park.

Tigard Transit Center Station was an existing TriMet transit center and is served by seven TriMet bus lines. Located in downtown Tigard, the station has about 100 park-and-ride spaces. Tualatin Station is in downtown Tualatin, on Boones Ferry Road near the intersection with Tualatin–Sherwood Road. The Tualatin station is served by TriMet bus lines 76 and 97 and includes 130 park-and-ride spaces, plus another 24 spaces in a nearby lot connected to the station by line 76.

The Wilsonville Transit Center, at the southern end of the line, provides about 400 park-and-ride spaces. Wilsonville's South Metro Area Regional Transit (SMART) opened a new transit center, known as "SMART Central", at the station in January 2009. Wilsonville Station is connected via buses to residential and employment zones in the city. Wilsonville and Salem-Keizer Transit (Cherriots) currently provide express bus service between the two cities, linking to the rail line. The city of Canby to the southeast also links to WES through SMART's service. Other neighboring communities are also expected to use the Wilsonville stop, including Lake Oswego, Donald, Woodburn, and Aurora.

Each WES station features its own interactive art-display, each dubbed "The (Station Name) Interactivator". The Interactivators were created by Frank Boyden and Brad Rude. The art consists of bronze and stainless steel sculptures that can be pushed around a track on a table, similar to how the WES train moves on its own track.

List of WES Commuter Rail stations
Station	Image	Location	Connections/notes
Beaverton Transit Center		Beaverton	MAX Light Rail: Blue Line, Red Line; TriMet: 19, 52, 54, 57, 76, 78, 88, 288
Hall/Nimbus		Beaverton	TriMet: 76; Park and ride: 50 spaces
Tigard Transit Center		Tigard	TriMet: 12, 43, 76, 78, 94; YCTA: 24S, 44; Park and ride: 103 spaces
Tualatin		Tualatin	TriMet: 76, 97; Tualatin Shuttle; Park and ride: 129 spaces
Wilsonville		Wilsonville	SMART: 1X, 2X, 3X, 4, 5, 6, 7, 10X, 12X; Cherriots: 01X; Park and ride: 399 spaces

== Operations ==
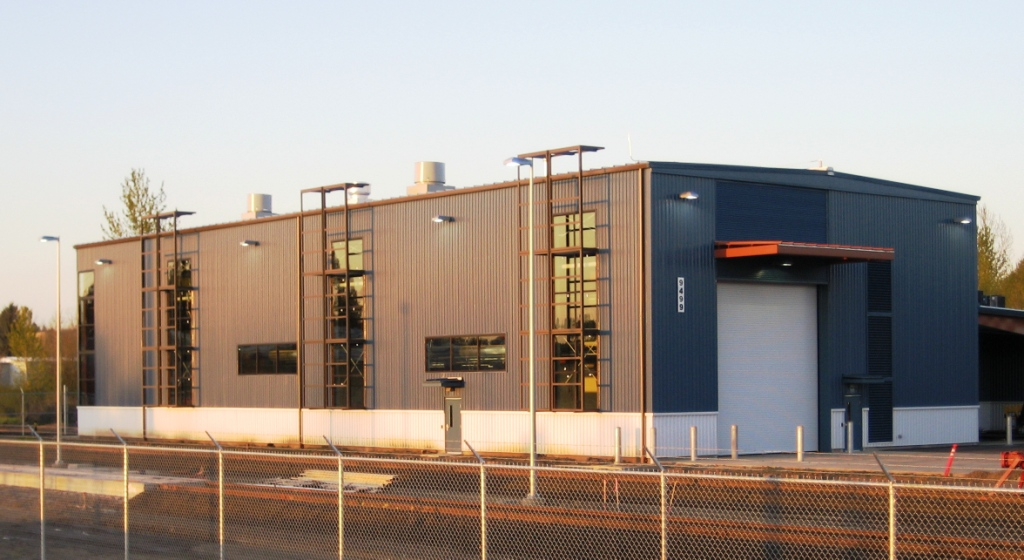
WES maintenance facility in Wilsonville

TriMet and P&W operate WES under a 50-year shared-use agreement. They entered into a 10-year operations and maintenance contract, which includes a trackage rights agreement, in 2007, with a renewal option every five years. TriMet owns the rail equipment, which it maintains with its employees, and contracts with P&W to operate the WES trains and maintain the tracks. P&W dispatches WES trains with priority over freight trains. TriMet also leases property near the Wilsonville terminus from P&W, where it built a dedicated maintenance facility for WES. The facility is staffed with TriMet mechanics who were trained to meet the Federal Railroad Administration-mandated qualified mechanical person certification.

=== Rolling stock ===
TriMet's fleet of commuter-rail cars consists of three powered cars and one "control trailer", a type of car which isn't powered but has an operating cab at one end and can control the powered car to which it is coupled. The trailer can be pulled or pushed. The self-propelled diesel cars do not require a locomotive or overhead electrical wires. Each of the three powered rail cars seats 74 passengers, while the control trailer seats 80. The cars are numbered 1001–1003 (powered) and 2001 (trailer) in TriMet's fleet of vehicles. Originally priced at $4 million each prior to cost overruns, the cars are equipped with places for two mobility devices and two hanging bicycle racks, and have enough space for 139 standing passengers. In a two-car train, passengers can pass between the two connected cars. Interiors of both car types contain high-back seats with blue upholstery.

Trains on WES were designed to travel at an average speed of 37 miles per hour (60 km/h) with a top speed of 60 miles per hour (97 km/h). Each self-propelled car has two Detroit Diesel Series 60 12.7L engines, each of which is rated at 600 horsepower. TriMet was required to purchase U.S.-manufactured trains due to federal funding of the commuter line, and purchased from Colorado Railcar, which at the time was the sole U.S. maker of DMUs that complied with Federal Railroad Administration (FRA) rules. The WES cars and the 35 freight locomotives sharing the track with WES include cab signals as part of a system designed to prevent train-to-train collisions. Positive train control is being installed along the line. Cars on the line are serviced and maintained by TriMet at the maintenance facility at the southern end of the line in Wilsonville. Adjacent to Wilsonville Station, the blue metal structure employs six mechanics. The adjacent rail yard is used to store all WES trains when not in service.

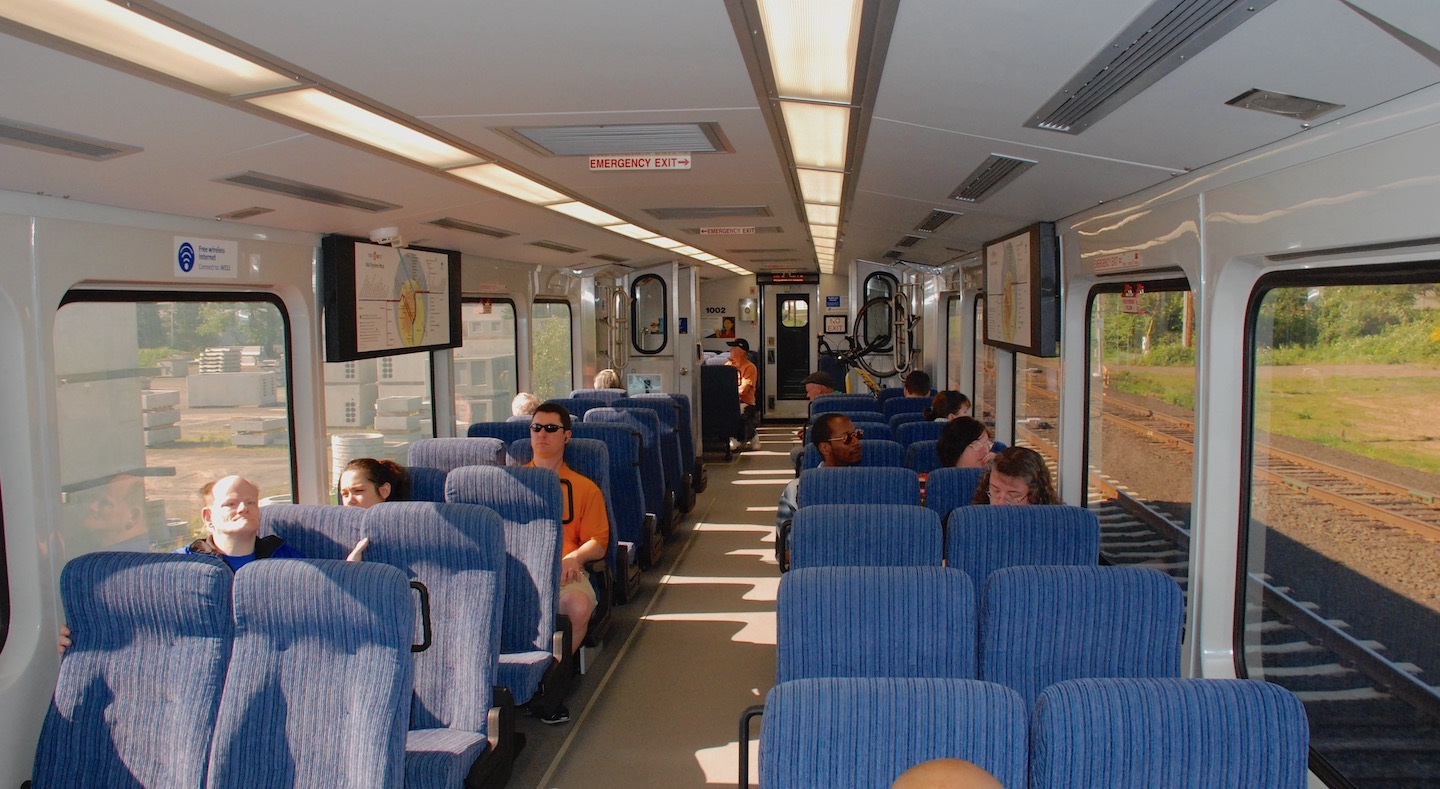
Interior of a Colorado Railcar WES coach

One piece of equipment replaced only a month after WES began operations is its train horn. The FRA requires all trains operating on heavy rail lines to sound their horns for at least 15 seconds at a minimum level of 96 decibels (from 100 feet (30.5 m)) as they approach crossings. For the rush hour-only schedule used when WES began operation, that meant over a thousand blasts a week along its route, starting as early as 5:30 am. Complaints about the noise caused TriMet to replace the original 102-decibel (from 100 feet (30.5 m)) Leslie RS3K horns for a fleet-wide cost of $5,000. The new 96-decibel (from 100 feet (30.5 m)) K3LA horns, which met the minimum requirements, still led to complaints. TriMet asked the FRA for a waiver, proposing that they install yet another horn — similar to that used on MAX Light Rail — that would sound at 80 decibels and be accompanied by bells that would ring at 60 decibels continuously as the train neared a crossing. However, the FRA turned down this request, citing safety concerns. Instead, a quiet zone was set for all crossings within Tualatin city limits.

Equipment failures and periodic maintenance on the agency's Colorado Railcar DMUs resulted in TriMet substituting buses for some runs on several occasions since the service began. To provide backup equipment for the line, TriMet purchased two Budd Rail Diesel Cars (RDCs) from the Alaska Railroad in 2009. The cars were originally built in 1953, and had been taken out of service in 2008. TriMet refurbished the cars, and planned to operate them as a backup for the Colorado Railcar units when they are out of service. They entered service on January 24, 2011.

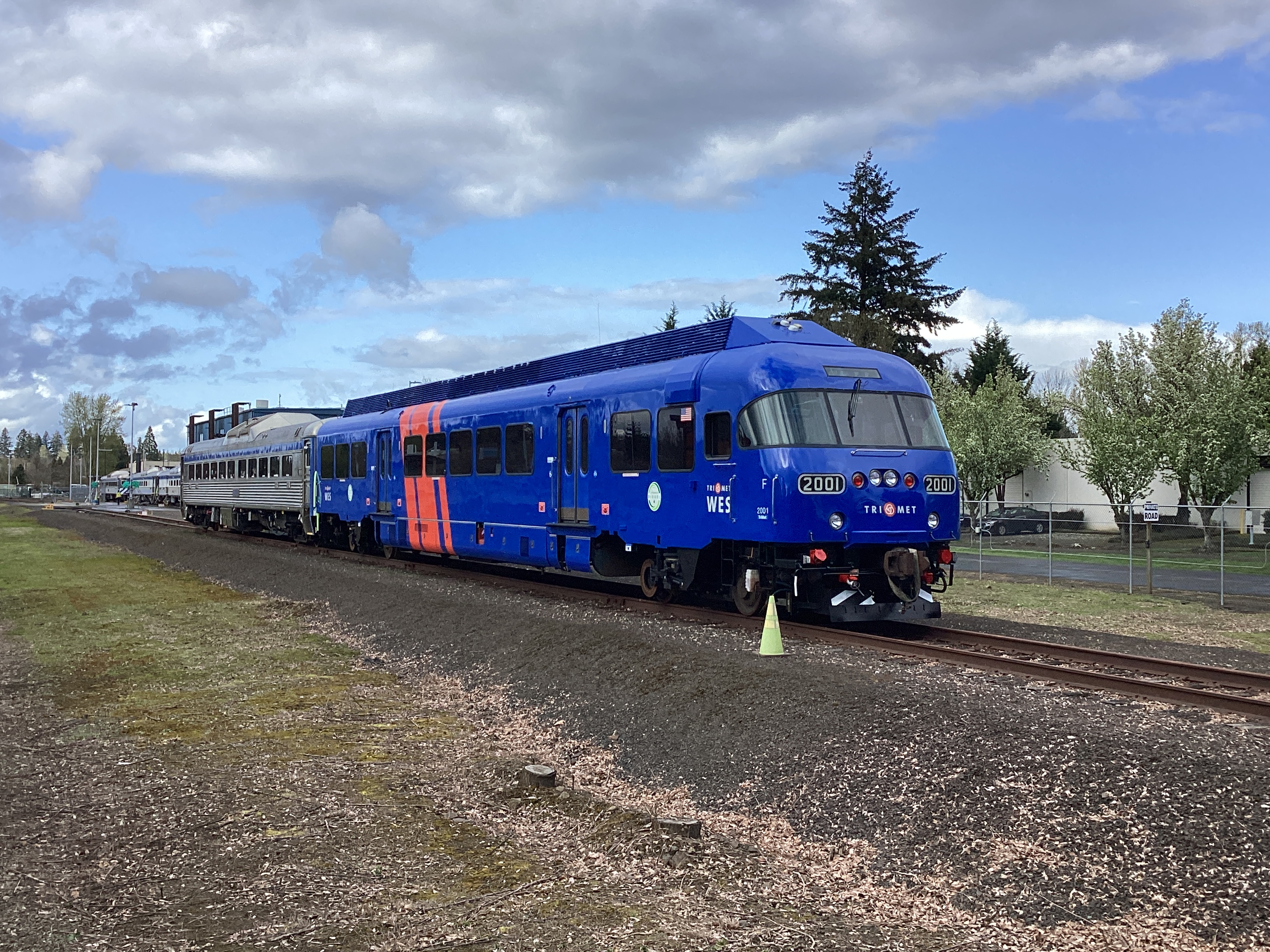
Repainted cab car 2001 in March 2025

In 2014, TriMet considered purchasing one two-car Nippon Sharyo DMU trainset to supplement the WES fleet, as an option under an existing contract between that manufacturer and Sonoma–Marin Area Rail Transit, but could not reach an agreement with the manufacturer on the price. US Railcar, Colorado Railcar's successor, offered to sell TriMet two cars at $5 million each. TriMet opted instead to purchase two more used Budd RDCs, for a total of not more than $1.5 million, in 2017 from Allearth Rail of Vermont, which had last been operated by Dallas Area Rapid Transit's Trinity Railway Express (TRE) commuter rail service. TriMet had unsuccessfully bid to purchase the same two cars in 2016, when they were auctioned by DART, but subsequently negotiated to purchase them from the winning bidder and new owner, Allearth Rail. The two cars, ex-TRE 2007 and 2011, arrived at the WES maintenance facility in August 2017. They were originally expected to enter service on the WES line in fall 2018, after the completion of a few modifications, but this was subsequently delayed to sometime in 2021 and later indefinitely.

WES rolling stock
Car number(s)	Image	Manufacturer	Model	Year built	First used on WES	Notes
1001–1003	A WES train parked next to the maintenance building. Each of WES's Colorado Railcar-built cars has one streamlined end (on the right in this view) and one non-streamlined end.	Colorado Railcar	Aero	2008	2009	Diesel multiple units (DMUs)
2001	A WES train parked next to the maintenance building. Each of WES's Colorado Railcar-built cars has one streamlined end (on the right in this view) and one non-streamlined end.	Colorado Railcar	Aero	2008	2009	Unpowered control car
1702	TriMet's RDC train 1702+1711 on Lombard Avenue in Beaverton in 2017	Budd	RDC-3	1953	2011	Ex-Alaska Railroad 702; originally New Haven 129
1711	TriMet's RDC train 1702+1711 on Lombard Avenue in Beaverton in 2017	Budd	RDC-2	1952	2011	Ex-Alaska Railroad 711; originally New Haven 121
2007		Budd	RDC-1	1957	TBD	Ex-Trinity Railway Express (Dallas) 2007; ex-Via Rail 6127; ex-Canadian Pacific 9062
2011		Budd	RDC-1	1957	TBD	Ex-Trinity Railway Express (Dallas) 2011; ex-Via Rail 6126; ex-Canadian Pacific 9059

=== Costs ===
According to TriMet's 2016 Ridership Report, WES Commuter Rail cost of $16.32 for each rider; compared to $4.21 for a bus rider or $3.23 for a MAX light rail rider. Amid the COVID-19 pandemic, ridership has further decreased and the WES operations cost per boarding ride is $108.09 as of December 2020.

== Service ==
=== Ridership ===
WES was expected to carry as many as 4,000 riders by 2020. A study published by the FTA in 2013 noted an increase in daily ridership on WES during the first few years of operation—from 1,200 rides in the first year to 1,700 rides in 2012—despite reductions in TriMet services that led to no growth systemwide. Three-fourths of riders traveled between home and work, and approximately 45 percent of riders reported lacking a car.

== See also ==
- Transportation in Portland, Oregon
