= Beaverton and Willsburg Railroad =

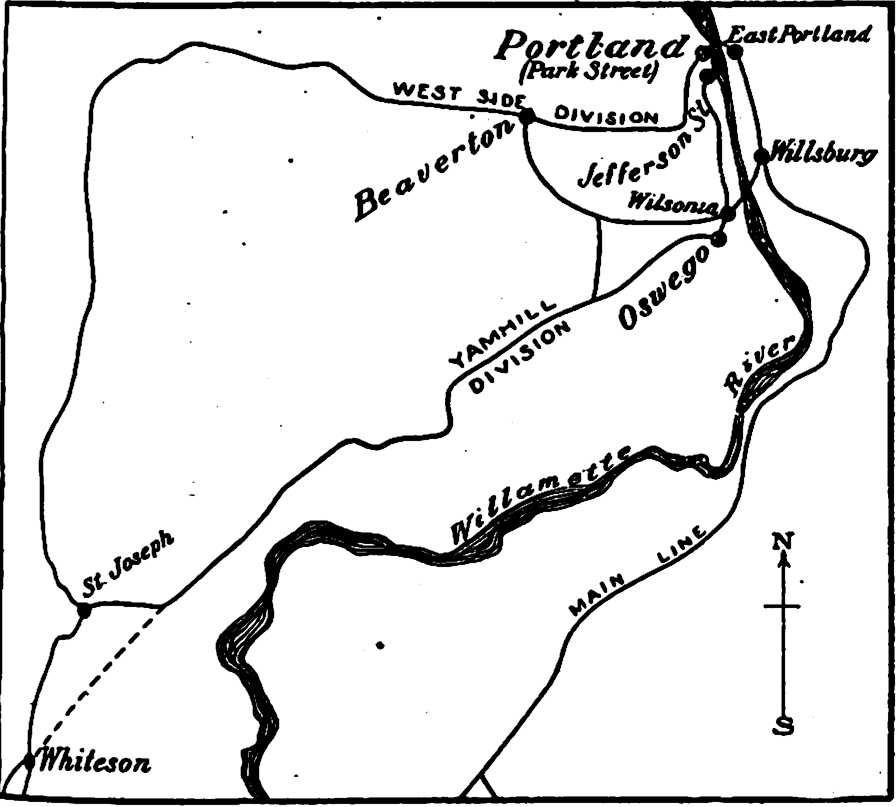
- Map showing the Southern Pacific lines in Portland circa 1910. The Beaverton cut-off runs from Beaverton to Willsburg via Oswego.

Overview
- Dates of operation: 1906–1916
- Successor: Southern Pacific Transportation Company

Technical
- Track gauge: 1,435 mm (4 ft 8 1/2 in)
- Length: 10.6 miles (17.1 km)

The Beaverton and Willsburg Railroad was a railway company in the state of Oregon in the United States. The Southern Pacific established the Beaverton and Willsburg Railroad in 1906 to construct a new cutoff in the vicinity of Portland, Oregon, to run between Beaverton and Milwaukie. The line was completed in 1910 and the company merged into the Southern Pacific in 1916. The cutoff, composed of two separate line segments, remains in use today.

== History ==
At the beginning of the 20th century the Southern Pacific had three routes into Portland, Oregon: the West Side branch (built by the Oregon Central Railroad) and the Newberg branch (built by the Portland and Willamette Valley Railway) on the west side of the Willamette River, and the Brooklyn Subdivision on the east side of the river. The West Side branch and Brooklyn Subdivision met at Portland Union Station, while the Newberg branch terminated at a separate station on Jefferson Street. Although the two stations were approximately 1.4 miles (2.3 km) apart, the lack of a direct connection meant that the rail distance was over 80 miles (130 km).

The Southern Pacific resolved this issue by constructing a new cutoff linking the three lines. This cutoff comprised two disconnected sections. The first, sometimes known as the Tigard branch, connected the West Side branch with the Newberg branch. Beginning at Beaverton, it ran 7.4 miles (11.9 km) southeast to "Cook," on the west side of Lake Oswego. The second, sometimes known as the Milwaukie branch, connected the Newberg branch with the Brooklyn Subdivision. Beginning at "Wilsonia," on the north side of Lake Oswego, it crossed the Willamette on the Lake Oswego Railroad Bridge, then turned north to run through Milwaukie to Willsburg Junction on the Brooklyn Subdivision. This portion of the line was 3.2 miles (5.1 km) long.

The Southern Pacific incorporated the company on November 6, 1906. Construction began in September 1907 and finished on July 17, 1910. The Pacific Coast Construction Company built the line, while Robert Wakefield, later involved with the Steel Bridge, erected the bridge over the Willamette. The Beaverton and Willsburg Railroad was conveyed to the Southern Pacific on June 30, 1916.
