= Tigard branch =

Railway line in Oregon, United States

Overview
- Owner: Union Pacific Railroad
- Locale: Washington County, Oregon

Service
- Services: WES Commuter Rail
- Operator(s): Portland and Western Railroad

History
- Opened: July 10, 1910

Technical
- Line length: 7.2 mi (11.6 km)
- Track gauge: 1,435 mm (4 ft 8 1/2 in) standard gauge
- Electrification: 1,500 V DC (1914–1929)

The Tigard branch is a short railway line on the west side of Portland, Oregon, in the United States. It connects the Union Pacific Railroad's West Side branch and Newberg branch. It was originally built in 1910 by the Beaverton and Willsburg Railroad, a subsidiary of the Southern Pacific Transportation Company. The Portland and Western Railroad operates the line, including the WES Commuter Rail service.

== Route ==
The Tigard branch begins west of Lake Oswego, at "Cook," where it connects with the Newberg branch. It runs northwest to Beaverton, where it connects with the West Side branch. A short spur runs to the Beaverton Transit Center, the northern terminus of the WES Commuter Rail service.

== History ==
=== Southern Pacific ===
The Beaverton and Willsburg Railroad, a subsidiary of the Southern Pacific Transportation Company, constructed the Tigard branch as part of a new cutoff connecting the Southern Pacific's lines in the Portland area. The new line opened on July 17, 1910. The line handled trains to and from Tillamook, Oregon, and was sometimes, along with the Milwaukie branch and West Side branch, considered part of the Tillamook branch.

The Oregon Electric Railway began electrified passenger service between Portland and Salem in 1908. The Southern Pacific responded by electrifying some of its existing branch lines in the Portland area, including the Tigard branch. Electrified operation using 1,500 V DC began in 1914. Services began at Portland Union Station, then used either the Newberg or West Side branch to reach McMinnville and then Corvallis. Electrified operation ended on October 5, 1929.

=== Portland and Western ===
In 1995 the new Portland and Western Railroad leased several branches from the Southern Pacific, including the Milwaukie branch. These leases continued when the Southern Pacific merged with the Union Pacific Railroad. Administratively, the Portland and Western has divided the Tigard branch into two parts:

- the OE District between Beaverton and Bonita. The district also includes the former Oregon Electric Railway main line.
- the Willsburg District between Bonita and Cook. The district also includes the Milwaukie and Newberg branches.

=== WES Commuter Rail ===
Passenger service returned to the Tigard branch in 2009 when the WES Commuter Rail service began operation. The Portland and Western operates the service under a purchase of service agreement with TriMet. Five new stations were built, three of them on the Tigard branch: the Beaverton Transit Center, Hall/Nimbus station, and the Tigard Transit Center. The latter two stations have gauntlet tracks for safer freight operation. The Beaverton Transit Center is located north of the existing right-of-way and required the construction of a 0.5-mile (0.80 km) spur.
