= Tigard Transit Center =

Transport hub in Tigard, Oregon, U.S.

Tigard TC
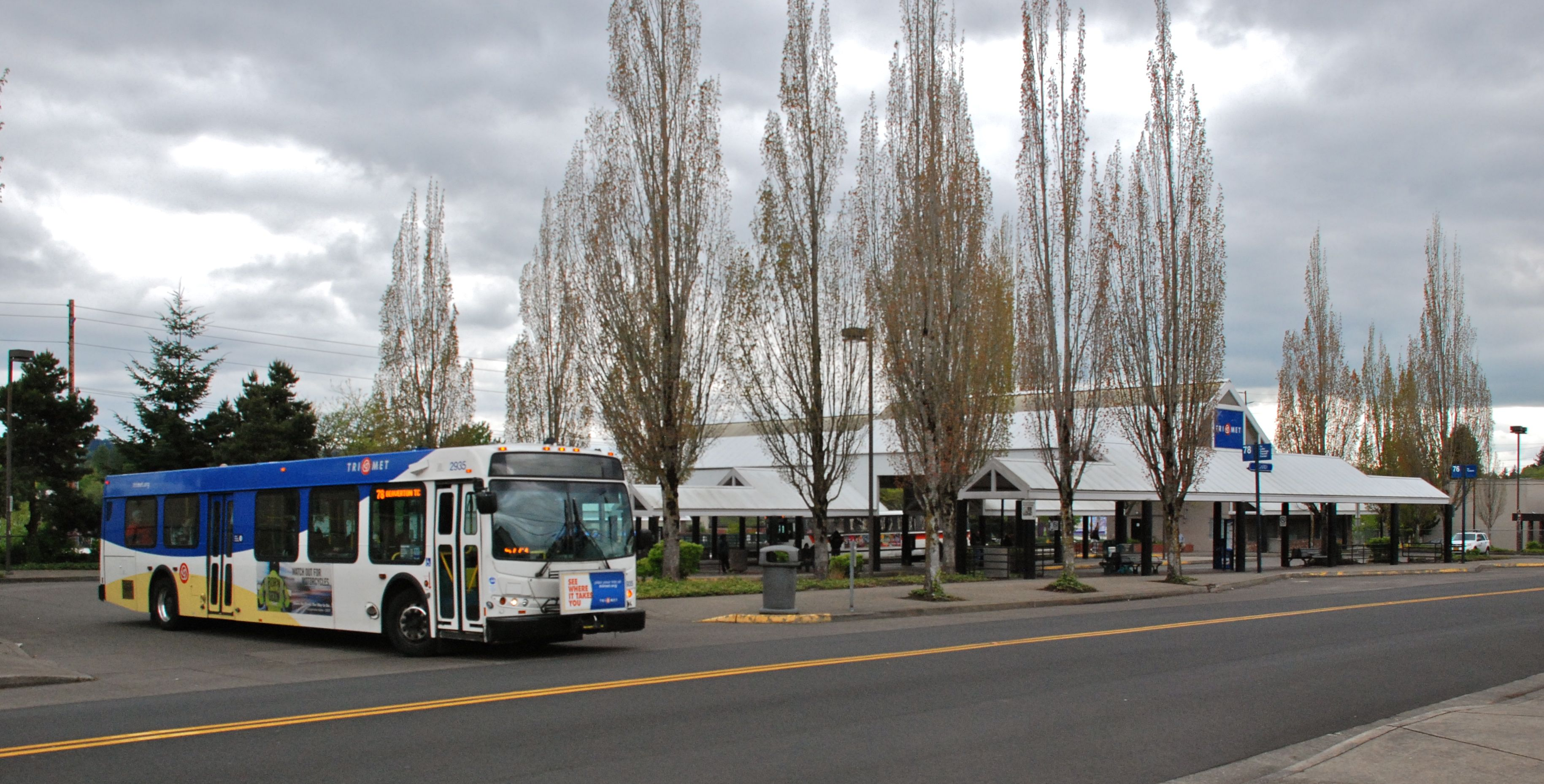
- The transit center from Commercial Street in 2012

General information
- Other names: Thomas M. Brian Tigard Transit Center
- Location: 8960 SW Commercial Street; Tigard, Oregon, U.S.
- Coordinates: 45°25′48″N 122°46′10″W
- Owner: TriMet
- Line: Tigard branch
- Platforms: 1 island platform
- Tracks: 2

Construction
- Structure type: At-grade
- Parking: 100 spaces
- Accessible: yes

History
- Opened: 1988

Passengers
- Fall 2019: 1,627 weekday boardings

Services
Preceding station	TriMet	Following station
Tualatin toward Wilsonville Transit Center	WES Commuter Rail	Hall/Nimbus toward Beaverton Transit Center
Location

Tigard Transit Center, formally Thomas M. Brian Tigard Transit Center, is a transport hub in Tigard, Oregon, United States, that is owned and operated by TriMet. It is a transfer facility for bus routes mainly serving the westside communities of the Portland metropolitan area and the third southbound station from Beaverton Transit Center on WES Commuter Rail. The transit center is located in downtown Tigard just south of Oregon Route 99W (OR 99W) on Commercial Street. It recorded 1,627 average weekday boardings in fall 2019. The facility opened in 1988 as a bus transit center, and a platform for WES was added in 2009.

== History ==
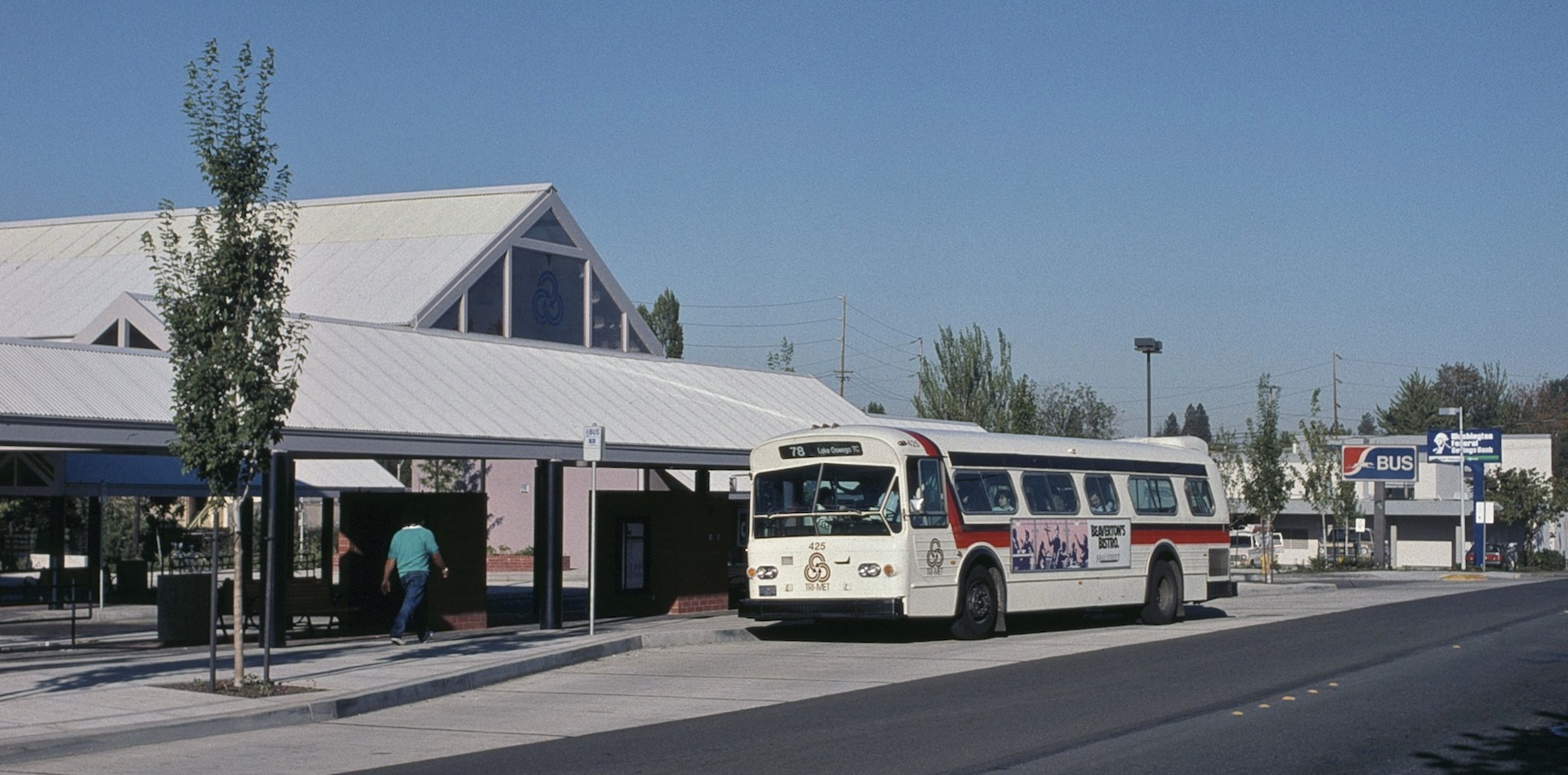
The transit center in 1988

Tigard Transit Center was designed by Skidmore, Owings & Merrill and opened for buses in 1988, served by about 200 bus trips per day. The design received a commendation from the local chapter of the American Institute of Architects in 1988. The site already had a Greyhound bus station (located in an adjacent storefront), which remained there after the transit center's opening but moved to a location on Main Street in the 1990s.

Plans for a rail connection started as early as 1991 when a proposal for a light rail line was studied, with the transit center as its southern terminus. As of 2009, this line has not been built, but it is still planned with studies to begin as early as 2013.

Plans for the commuter rail service between Beaverton and Wilsonville began as early as 1996. In 2001, the Federal Transit Administration authorized the project, and in 2004 it approved the project. Construction began in October 2006. The line is the first suburb-to-suburb commuter rail line in the United States, and the first commuter rail line in Oregon.

Groundbreaking for the rail station at the center was in December 2006, and was led by Oregon senators Gordon Smith and Ron Wyden. The public artwork at the station was installed on September 3, 2008. The line was opened on February 2, 2009. In 2009, TriMet announced they would add additional bike lockers at the transit center using federal stimulus funds. In May 2011, the transit center was dedicated as the Thomas M. Brian Tigard Transit Center in honor of former Tigard mayor and county commissioner Thomas M. Brian, who had helped make the WES rail line a reality.

== Station details ==
The WES station is one of five on the 14.7-mile (23.7 km) rail line that utilizes Portland and Western Railroad's freight rail line. Located in downtown Tigard on Commercial Street south of Oregon Route 99W, the station and line are only in operation during the morning and evening commute times from Monday through Friday. The station has 100 parking spaces at its park-and-ride lot and is served by seven bus lines. The city allocated $100,000 for refurbishing the existing TriMet-operated bus transit center at the site, which opened in 1988. At the northern terminus, the Beaverton Transit Center, passengers can connect to MAX Light Rail.

Public art at the station consists of an interactive sculpture created by Frank Boyden and Brad Rude. The sculpture features bronze heads and a vehicle designed to represent the train and the variety of people who ride the line. The vehicle moves along a track and has an animal figure displayed in a scene atop the piece. Additionally, the station has a mural along one of the walls.

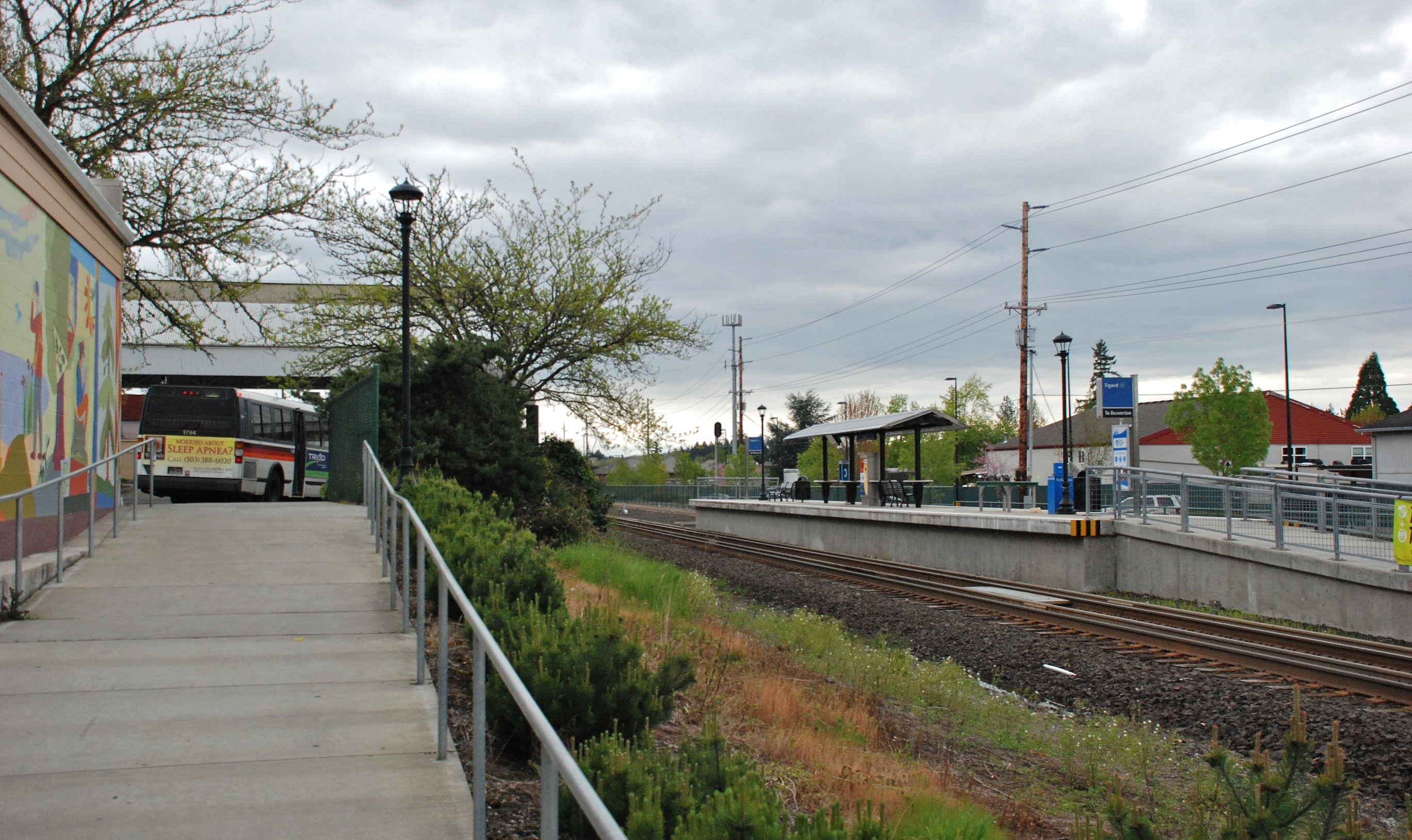
View from the walkway connecting the transit center's bus facility with the rail platform

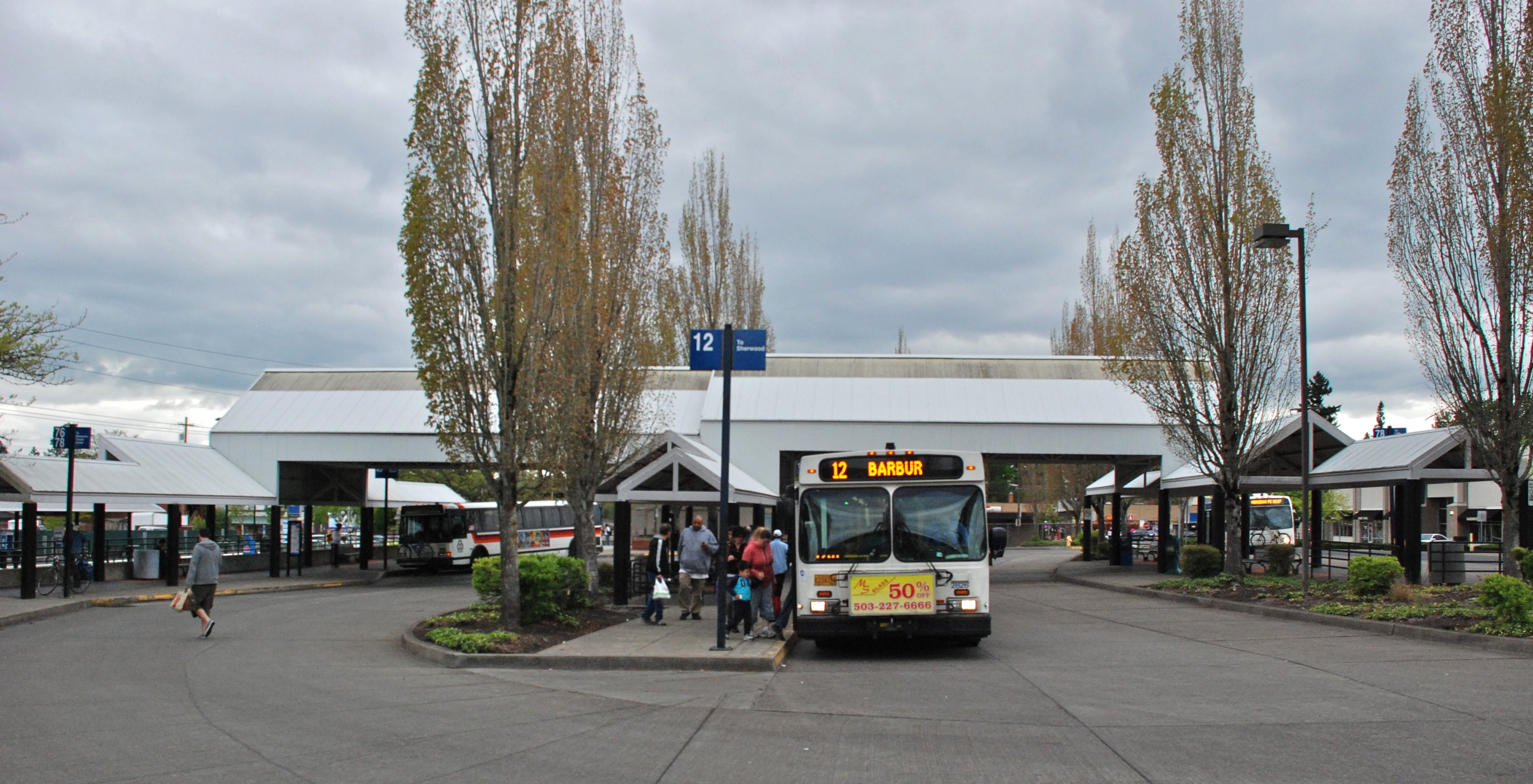
The 1988-opened bus transit center viewed from its southwest end in 2012

== Services ==
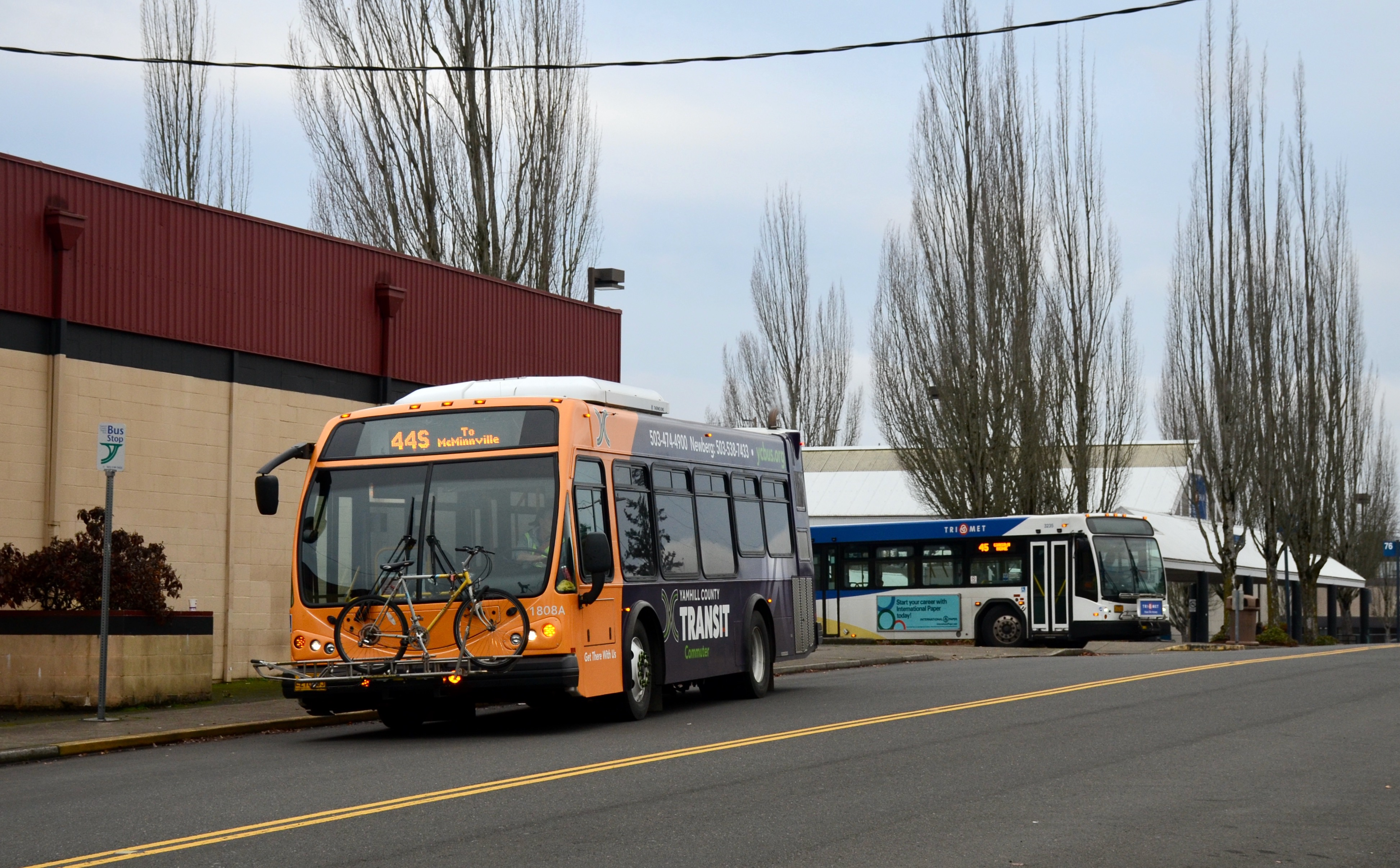
A Yamhill County Transit bus at the transit center in 2019, with a TriMet bus in the background

As of August 2026, Tigard Transit Center is served by the following bus lines:

- 12 – Barbur/Sandy Blvd
- 43 - Taylors Ferry/Marquam Hill
- 76 – Hall/Greenburg
- 78 – Denney/Kerr Parkway
- 94 – Tigard/Sherwood
- Yamhill County Transit (YCTA) service to McMinnville (routes 44 and 44X, weekdays only; Saturday service indefinitely suspended)

Discontinued 8/23/26

- 45 – Garden Home

== See also ==
- List of TriMet transit centers
