= Hall/Nimbus station =

Train station in Beaverton, Oregon

Hall/Nimbus
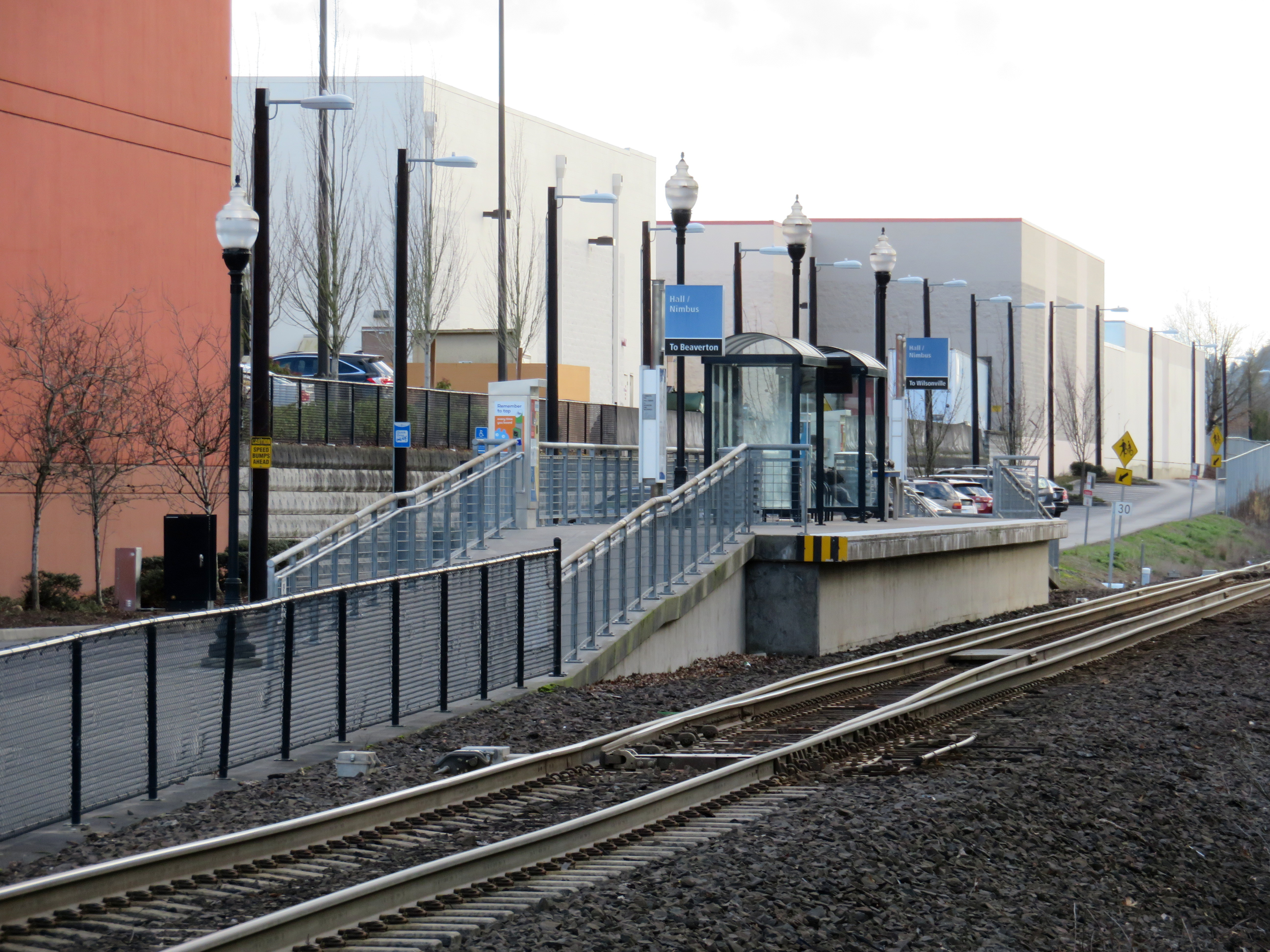
- The station's platform in 2018

General information
- Location: 8505 SW Cascade Avenue; Beaverton, Oregon, U.S.
- Coordinates: 45°27′30″N 122°47′13″W
- Owner: TriMet
- Line: Tigard branch
- Platforms: 1 side platform
- Tracks: 1
- Connections: TriMet bus

Construction
- Structure type: At-grade
- Parking: 50 spaces
- Cycle facilities: Lockers and racks
- Accessible: Yes

History
- Opened: February 2, 2009

Services
Preceding station	TriMet	Following station
Tigard Transit Center toward Wilsonville Transit Center	WES Commuter Rail	Beaverton Transit Center Terminus
Location

Hall/Nimbus station is a train station in Beaverton, Oregon, United States, served by TriMet as part of WES Commuter Rail. It is the second station southbound on the commuter rail line, which operates between Beaverton and Wilsonville in the Portland metropolitan area's Washington County.

Opened in February 2009, the TriMet-owned station is located west of Oregon Route 217 (OR 217) near the Washington Square shopping mall on Hall Boulevard. It includes a 50-car park and ride and connections to TriMet bus routes 76–Hall/Greenburg and 78–Denney/Kerr Pkwy. WES connects with the Blue and Red lines of MAX Light Rail at Beaverton Transit Center.

== History ==
Planning for a commuter rail line between Beaverton and Wilsonville began as early as 1996. A design proposal in 2002 envisioned a station serving the Washington Square shopping mall on Scholls Ferry Road west of OR 217 called "Scholls Ferry/Washington Square", later renamed to just "Washington Square". An environmental analysis resulted in the project steering committee's decision to move the station farther north to just south of Hall Boulevard to leverage opportunities with nearby developments and anticipated transit improvements.

The Federal Transit Administration approved the commuter rail line in 2004, and work began in October 2006. By 2008, TriMet had again renamed the station to "Hall/Nimbus," and construction of its platform had begun; it was the last station to be built. That September, crews installed the public artwork. Originally scheduled to open in the fall, the station opened along with the inauguration of the Westside Express Service (WES) on February 2, 2009.

== Station details ==
Hall/Nimbus station is located on Hall Boulevard near the Nimbus Corporate Center and the Washington Square mall in Beaverton, just west of OR 217. It is the second of five stations southbound on the 14.7-mile (23.7 km) WES Commuter Rail line, which utilizes Portland and Western Railroad's Tigard branch. WES operates from Monday through Friday during the morning and evening rush hour commutes. At the line's northern terminus at Beaverton Transit Center, riders may transfer to the Blue and Red lines of MAX Light Rail. The station has 50 park-and-ride spaces, as well as 10 lockers and 16 rack spaces for bicycles. A nearby bus stop connects to TriMet bus routes 76–Hall/Greenburg and 78–Denney/Kerr Pkwy.

The public artwork on the platform is an interactive sculpture created by Frank Boyden and Brad Rude called The Interactivator. It is made of steel and bronze with blue accents and features bronze heads and a U-shaped vehicle, all of which were designed to represent the train and the variety of people who ride the line. Attached to a large, round flat surface made of stainless steel, the vehicle moves along a track and has an animal figure displayed in a scene atop the piece. The moveable heads include a pumpkin, a blindfolded man, and a blue skull.
