= Lake Oswego Railroad Bridge =

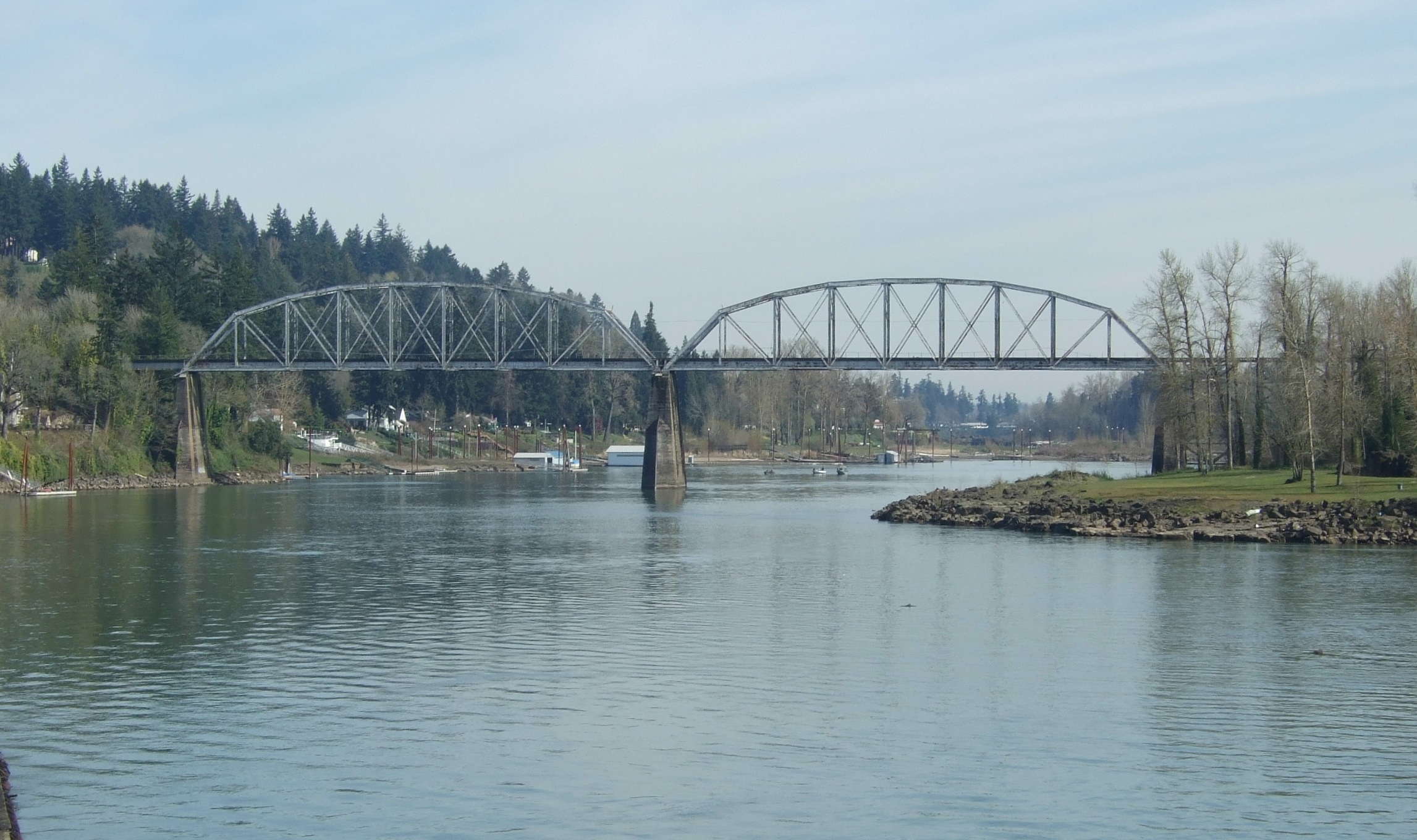
- Coordinates: 45.4251°N 122.6547°W
- Carries: Milwaukie branch
- Crosses: Willamette River
- Locale: Lake Oswego, Oregon to Oak Grove, Oregon
- Maintained by: Portland and Western Railroad

Characteristics
- Design: Truss bridge
- Total length: 1,378 feet (420 m)
- Longest span: 298 feet (91 m)

History
- Constructed by: Robert Wakefield
- Opened: 1910

The Lake Oswego Railroad Bridge (also known as the Union Pacific Railroad Bridge at Lake Oswego and formerly as the Southern Pacific Railroad Bridge at Lake Oswego) is a truss railroad bridge that spans the Willamette River between Lake Oswego, Oregon and Oak Grove, Oregon. Owned by the Union Pacific Railroad, it is currently leased by the Portland and Western Railroad and carries the Milwaukie branch.

== History ==
The bridge was built in 1910 by the Beaverton and Willsburg Railroad, a subsidiary of Southern Pacific Company, in response to the desires of Portland city planners for an eastside railway bypass to keep rail traffic out of downtown Portland. Robert Wakefield, later involved with the Steel Bridge, was the builder. With its acquisition of Southern Pacific in 1996, Union Pacific Railroad assumed ownership of the bridge. Currently, the bridge is operated by the Portland and Western Railroad under a lease from Union Pacific.

== Description ==
The entire bridge is 1,378 feet (420 m) in length. On the west (Lake Oswego) side, there is a 50-foot (15 m) deck plate girder approach span that was built in 1900 and moved to this location in 1931. In 1934, a 60-foot (18 m) open-deck trestle was built on this side of the river. Holding the railway deck across the river are two 298-foot (91 m) through truss spans. Completing the bridge on the east side in Oak Grove is a 668-foot (204 m) open-deck trestle.

== Usage ==
Though the bridge is now used exclusively for active freight rail transport, some Portland-area commuters have urged that the bridge be modified to allow commuter rail or bicycle traffic.

== See also ==
- List of crossings of the Willamette River
