= Newberg branch =

Railway line in Oregon, United States

History
- Opened: 23 July 1888

Technical
- Line length: 36 mi (58 km)
- Track gauge: 1,435 mm (4 ft 8 1/2 in) standard gauge
- Old gauge: 3 ft (914 mm)
- Electrification: 1,500 V DC (1914–1929)

The Newberg branch is a railway line in the state of Oregon, in the United States. It runs 36 miles (58 km) from Portland to a junction with the West Side branch west of Saint Joseph. It was originally built by the Portland and Willamette Valley Railway, a predecessor of the Southern Pacific Transportation Company.

Today, ownership is split between the Willamette Shore Line Consortium north of Lake Oswego and the Union Pacific Railroad (Portland and Western Railroad lessee) south of Lake Owsego.

== Route ==
The north part of the line terminates at Bancroft street in Portland, one block south of the south end of the NS Line of the Portland Streetcar. The line between Portland and Lake Oswego is sometimes known separately as the Jefferson Street branch. It follows the west bank of the Willamette River to Lake Oswego.

The line continues west from Lake Oswego to a location known as "Cook", where the Tigard branch splits off to the northwest. The Newberg branch continues southwest, crossing both the Tualatin River and the former main line of the Oregon Electric Railway. In Saint Joseph the line joins with the West Side branch.

== History ==
=== Construction ===
The Newberg branch was built to connect a network of 3 ft (914 mm) gauge railroads in the Yamhill Valley to Portland. The construction was undertaken by the Portland and Willamette Valley Railway, incorporated on January 19, 1885. The line opened between Dundee and Elk Rock, 5 miles (8.0 km) south of Portland, in "late 1886." The line into Portland itself was not finished until July 23, 1888. In Dundee, it connected with the Oregonian Railway, also a narrow gauge road, whose main line continued southwest to Sheridan and Airlie.

The Southern Pacific Transportation Company acquired control of the line in 1892 through the Portland and Yamhill Railroad, and converted the line to standard gauge in 1893. In 1905, the Southern Pacific built a new cutoff from Dundee to Saint Joseph via Lafayette, connecting the line with the West Side branch.

=== Electric operation ===
The Oregon Electric Railway began electrified passenger service between Portland and Salem in 1908. The Southern Pacific responded by electrifying some of its existing branch lines in the Portland area, including the Newberg branch. Electrified operation using 1,500 V DC began in 1914. Services began at Portland Union Station, then used either the Newberg or West Side branch to reach McMinnville and then Corvallis. Electrified operation ended on October 5, 1929.

=== Post-Southern Pacific ===
The Newberg branch remained part of the Southern Pacific system, albeit as a branch line. In the 1970s, Oregon rejected using the branch for expanded passenger service given the lack of connection to Union Station in Portland. In 1988, the Willamette Shore Line Consortium purchased the northern end of the line between Oswego and Portland. The Willamette Shore Trolley heritage streetcar operates over the line.

In 1993, the Willamette and Pacific Railroad (W&P), a Genesee & Wyoming subsidiary, leased several Southern Pacific branches, including the Newberg branch between Newberg and Saint Joseph. In addition, the W&P had trackage rights over the rest of the Newberg branch and the Milwaukie branch, enabling it to reach Portland. In 1995, Genesee & Wyoming created another subsidiary, the Portland and Western Railroad (P&W), to lease and acquire various other branch lines in the Portland area. The P&W leased the remaining part of the Newberg branch between Newberg and Lake Oswego. The two Genesee & Wyoming companies have operated as a single unit since 2000. Administratively, the Portland and Western has divided its portion of the Newberg branch into two parts:

- the Willsburg District between Lake Oswego and Cook. The district also includes the Milwaukie branch
- the West Side District south of Cook. The district continues to Corvallis over the West Side branch.
