= Beaverton Transit Center =

Transport hub in Beaverton, Oregon, U.S.

Beaverton TC
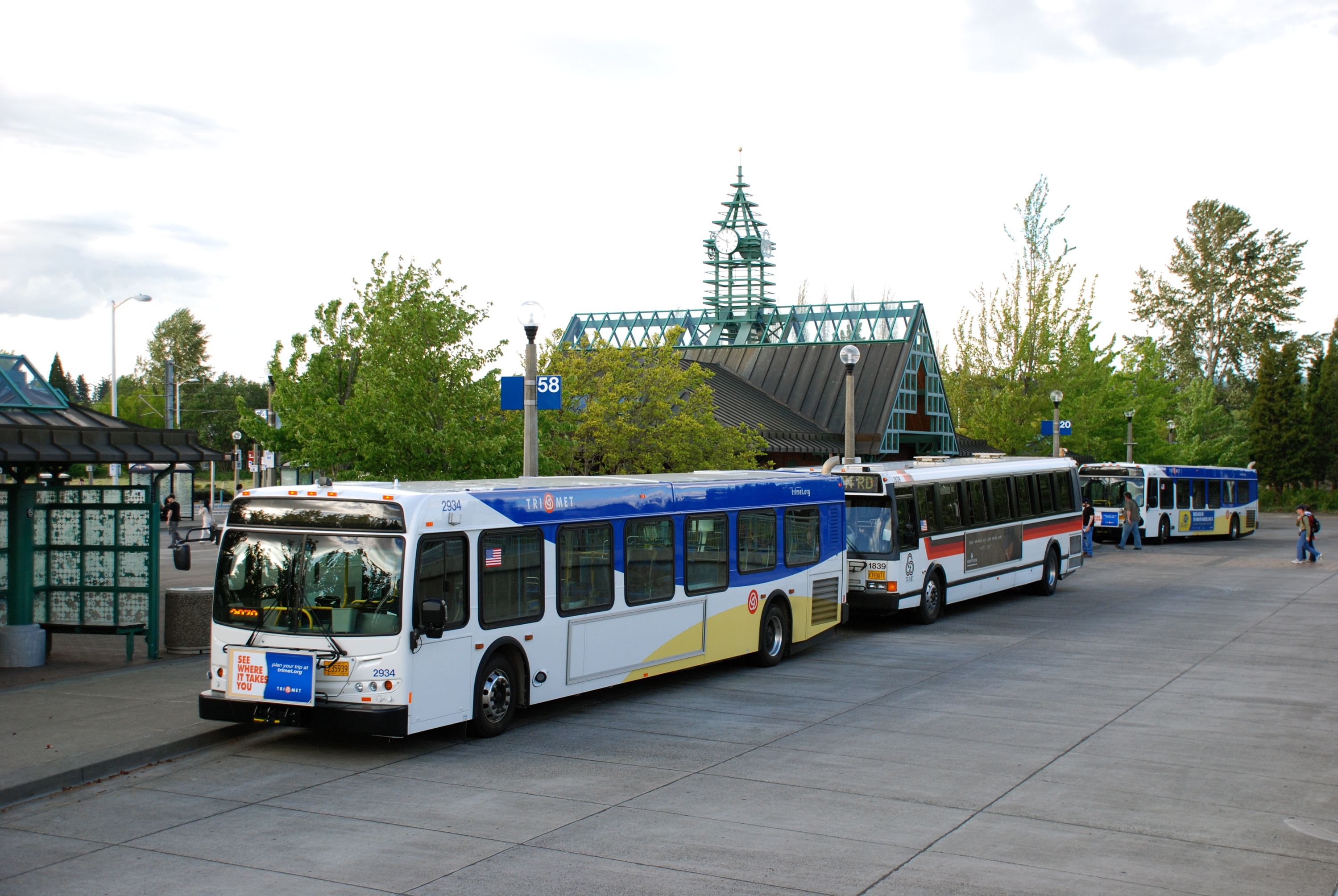
- TriMet buses lining the southeast side with the transit center's main structure in the background

General information
- Location: 4050 SW Lombard Avenue; Beaverton, Oregon, U.S.
- Coordinates: 45°29′28″N 122°48′04″W
- Owner: TriMet
- Lines: Westside MAX; Tigard branch
- Platforms: MAX: 2 side and 1 island platform; WES: 1 side platform
- Tracks: 4
- Bus routes: TriMet: 19, 52, 53, 54, 57, 76, 78, 88
- Bus operators: TriMet

Construction
- Structure type: At-grade
- Cycle facilities: Bike and ride, racks, and lockers
- Accessible: Yes

History
- Opened: September 4, 1988 (second facility)

Passengers
- Fall 2025: 4,210 (average weekday)
- Rank: 3 of 94

Services
Preceding station	TriMet	Following station
Beaverton Central toward Hatfield Government Center	Blue Line	Sunset Transit Center toward Cleveland Ave
Beaverton Central toward Hillsboro Airport/Fairgrounds	Red Line	Sunset Transit Center toward Portland Airport
Hall/Nimbus toward Wilsonville Transit Center	WES Commuter Rail	Terminus
Location

Beaverton Transit Center is a multimodal transport hub in Beaverton, Oregon, United States, served by bus, commuter rail, and light rail. The TriMet transit center is the 15th station eastbound on the MAX Blue Line, the 11th station eastbound on the MAX Red Line, the northern terminus of WES Commuter Rail, and a hub for bus routes mostly serving the westside communities of the Portland metropolitan area. The transit center is situated on Southwest Lombard Avenue, just north of Southwest Canyon Road in central Beaverton. In fall 2018, it recorded 9,709 average weekday boardings for all modes in fall 2018, making it TriMet's busiest transit center. In spring 2025, it was the agency's third-busiest transit center.

The first Beaverton Transit Center, which was one of two transit centers built in Beaverton as part of TriMet's Westside Transit Plan, opened near Beaverton–Hillsdale Highway and Lombard Avenue in 1979. The second and current facility, relocated farther north from the previous site, opened on September 4, 1988, for bus service. The Westside MAX project, which extended light rail from downtown Portland to Beaverton and Hillsboro, added light rail platforms in 1998. Initially served only by the Blue Line, Red Line service from Portland International Airport was extended to the transit center in 2003. WES began serving Beaverton Transit Center in 2009.

== History ==
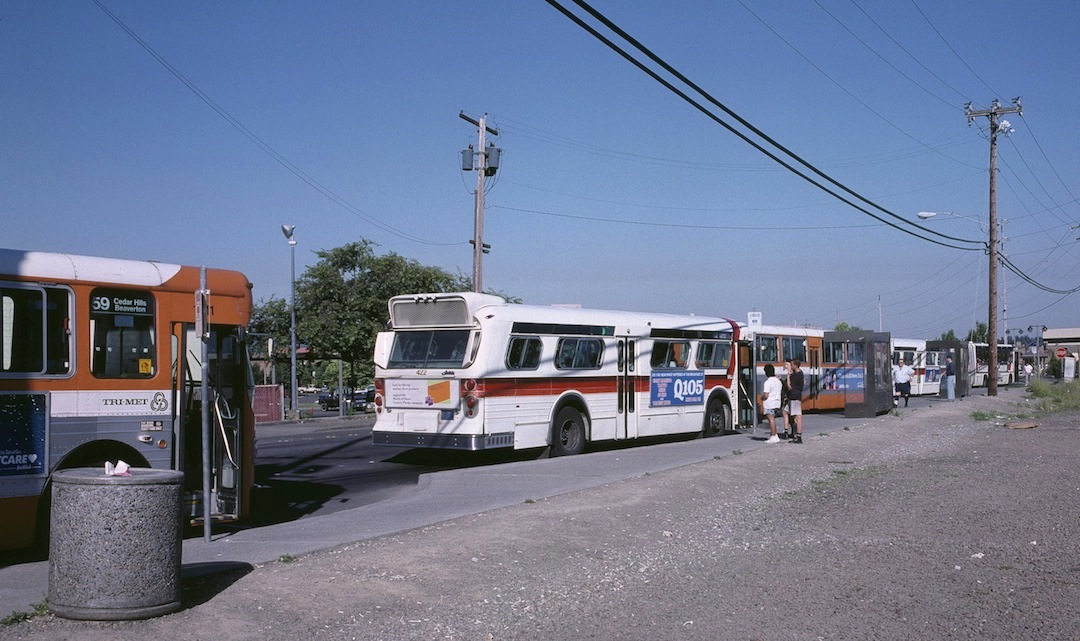
Buses at the first Beaverton Transit Center in 1988, shortly before its closure

The first Beaverton Transit Center opened in 1979 at a different location from the current facility, about 1,100 feet (340 m) farther south on Lombard Avenue and Broadway Street near Beaverton–Hillsdale Highway; there were timed transfer connections among the several bus routes that served it. It was one of two major transport hubs Portland's regional transit agency, TriMet, built in Beaverton as part of its Westside Transit Plan along with Cedar Hills Transit Center. The $1.3 million plan, which consisted of new and modified bus routes within the Portland metropolitan area's westside suburbs in Washington County and between those areas and downtown Portland, commenced service on June 17, 1979.

A new plan surfaced that same year amid discussions of building a busway or light rail line between Portland and the west side. In preparation for what would become the Westside MAX extension, which would extend the Metropolitan Area Express (MAX) from downtown Portland to Beaverton and Hillsboro, Beaverton city planners began considering the transit center's relocation in February 1982. TriMet studied three site proposals, which included an expansion of the existing location on Lombard Avenue and Broadway Street, a triangular area occupied by existing establishments between Hall Boulevard and Watson Avenue, and 4.8 acres (1.9 ha) of undeveloped land on Canyon Road and Hall Boulevard. Planners selected the third option the following September.

TriMet had targeted beginning construction of the replacement facility by the summer of 1987, but the discovery of an illegal land fill at the site, which revealed that the property had originally been a wetland, prevented the issuance of a U.S. Army Corps of Engineers (USACE) permit. Preliminary work finally started in October of that year after the USACE deemed that "public interest" outweighed the environmental losses caused by the land fill and issued the permit. Urban Mass Transportation Administration funds covered 80 percent of the project's $2 million budget, and the second Beaverton Transit Center opened on September 4, 1988. It was initially built as another bus-only transit center, but plans reserved an area on the north side of the property for future light rail platforms.

In 1993, TriMet began construction of the Westside MAX extension. During planning, Beaverton officials declined to build a park and ride near the transit center, stating that one of the goals of the light rail project was to reduce auto congestion in central Beaverton. The transit center's MAX platforms opened on September 12, 1998, at the same time as most of the extension. Between 1998 and 2001, TriMet operated only one MAX service, which ran the entire length of existing tracks from Hillsboro through downtown Portland to Gresham. That service was renamed the Blue Line in 2001 following the completion of the Airport MAX project, which introduced the Red Line to Portland International Airport. Originally, westbound Red Line trains only ran up to the Library and Galleria stations in downtown Portland, where they turned around at the 11th Avenue loop tracks. On September 1, 2003, TriMet extended Red Line service up to Beaverton Transit Center.

Proposals for connecting Beaverton and Wilsonville by commuter rail emerged in 1996. The committee studying the rail plan examined two options for the line's northern terminus: Beaverton Transit Center and Merlo Road/Southwest 158th Avenue station. A revised plan selected a shorter route to Beaverton Transit Center in 2000. After several years of delays due to a lack of funding, a platform for the WES Commuter Rail line began construction at the southern end of the transit center in 2006. Regular service on the WES line commenced on February 2, 2009.

In March 2011, TriMet began construction of one of two bike-and-ride facilities at Beaverton Transit Center (the other at Gresham Central Transit Center), its second after the first facility built at Sunset Transit Center. The Beaverton Transit Center bike and ride opened the following July with 100 spaces for bicycles, at the time the largest in the TriMet system and the Pacific Northwest.

In August 2022, TriMet received a $5.6 million grant from the Federal Transit Administration to upgrade Beaverton Transit Center. Construction began in spring 2026 and is expected to be completed in spring 2027.

== Station details ==
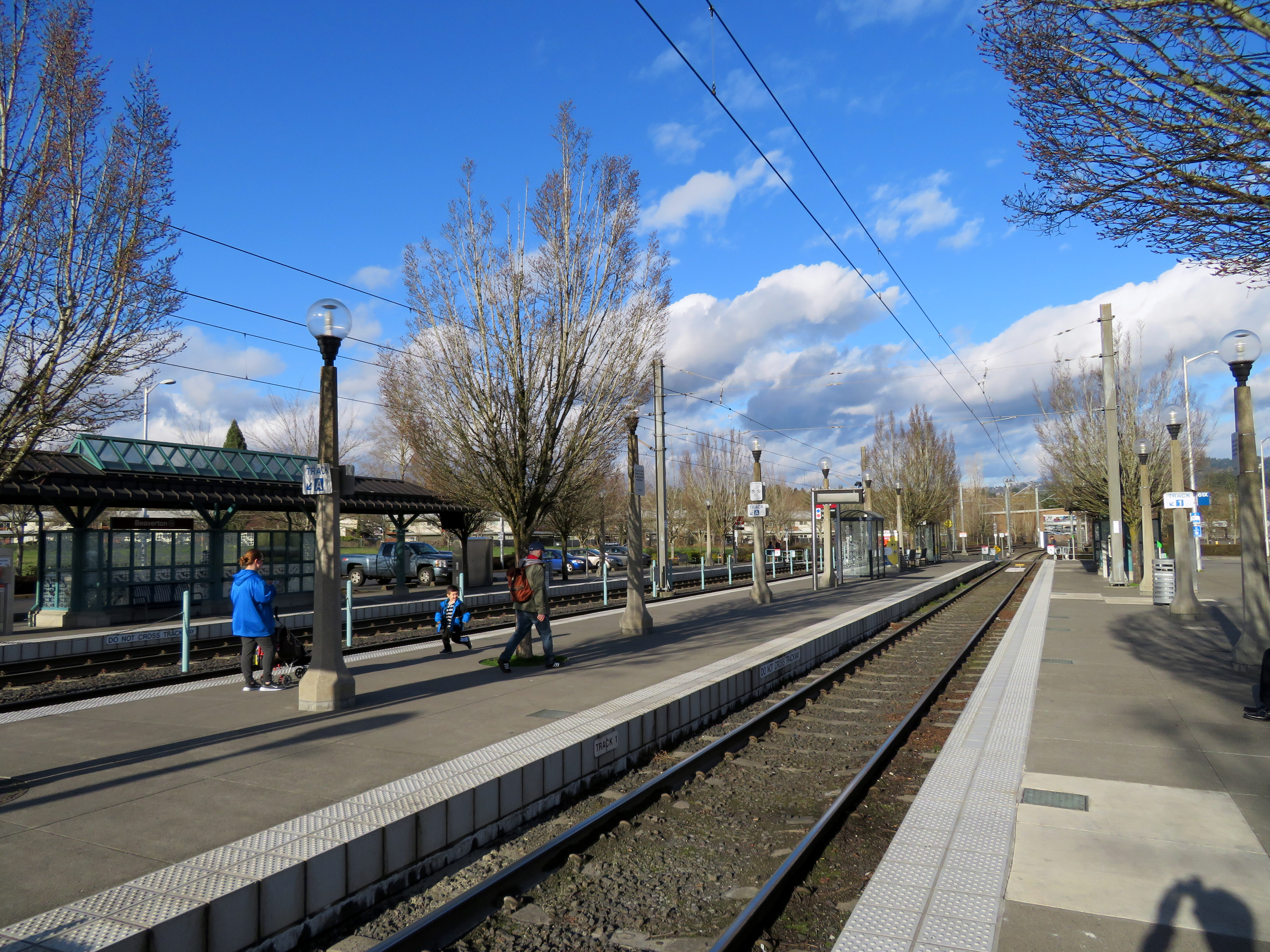
MAX Light Rail platforms

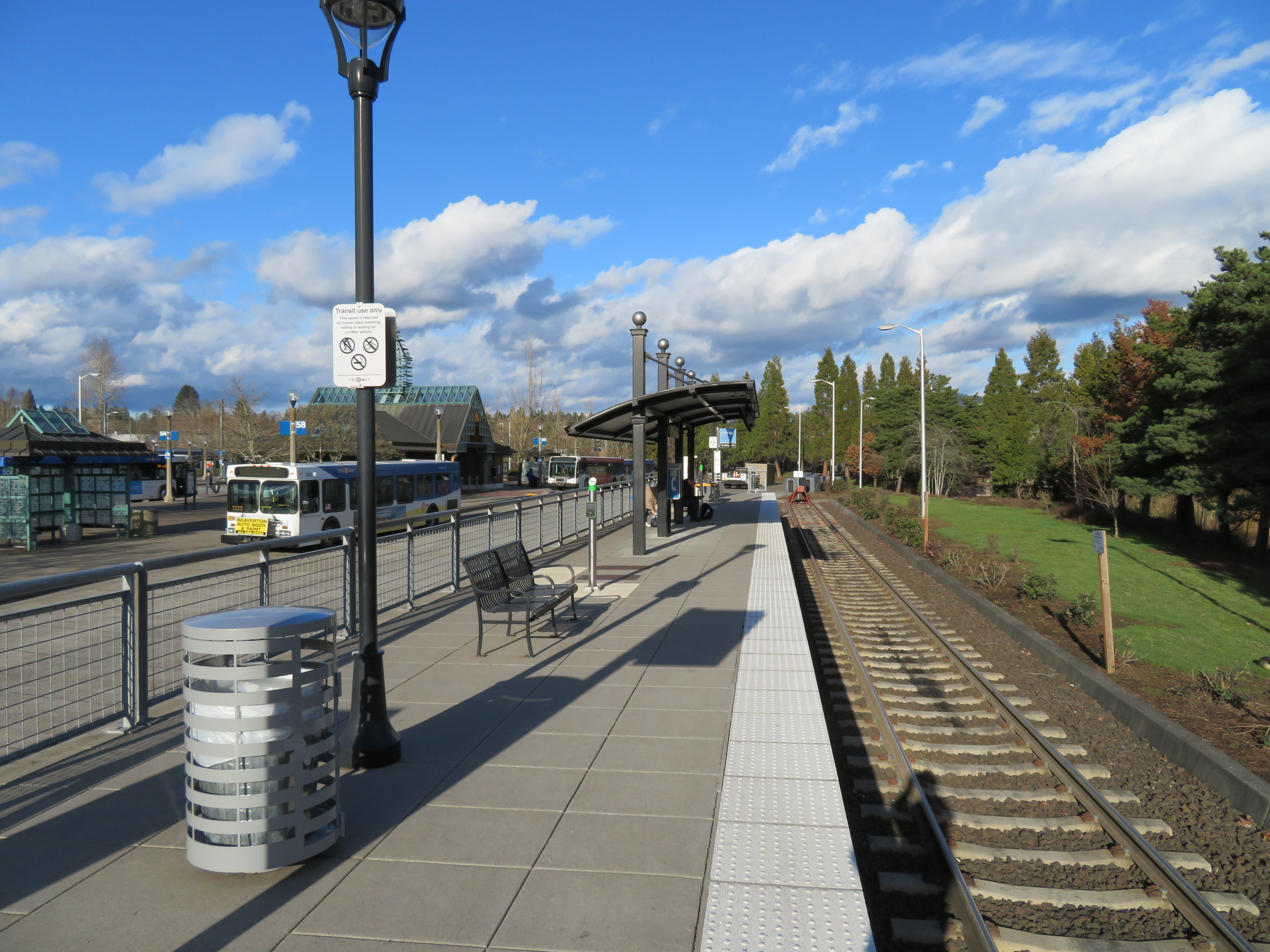
WES Commuter Rail platform

Beaverton Transit Center serves the central Beaverton area. It is located north of Southwest Canyon Road, bound by Southwest Lombard Avenue to the west, Beaverton Creek to the south, and Canyon Place Shopping Center to the east. A bus-only loop containing nine bus bays occupies most of the property, and a structure in the center houses a concession stand.

The MAX platforms, designed by OTAK, Inc., are situated in the northwest and consists of two side platforms and one island platform, served by three tracks. Prior to the Red Line's extension to Hillsboro, the outer tracks were used by the Blue Line, while the middle track was used by the Red Line. A 15-minute pick-up and drop-off area containing several parking spaces is adjacent to the westernmost MAX platform. The WES platform occupies the southeastern edge of the transit center and is served by a single-track railway with a buffer stop marking the end of the line. All of the transit center's rail platforms feature ticket vending machines and passenger information displays. As of October 2020, the transit center has a total of 136 bicycle parking spaces of which 76 are inside a secure bike and ride.

=== Public art ===
The MAX station's original shelter featured "whimsical photographic portraits of passengers" and images of local landmarks. These photos were captured by students Katie O'Malley and Petra Prostrednik of Beaverton's Arts and Communications High School. They were led by design team artist Richard Turner and photographer Barbara Turner, who came up with the project as a way of giving the students hands-on experience in designing and implementing a public art project. In 1994, artist Christopher Rauschenberg photographed the station's site prior to the start of construction. This image was etched onto the station's windscreen. It is described as a way to "document the past as the areas change and grow and [to] offer a comparison with the landscape of the future". An interactive sculpture created by Frank Boyden and Brad Rude, entitled The Interactivator, sits on the WES platform. It features 16 movable bronze heads and a vehicle mounted on a stainless steel table. Designed to represent the train and the variety of people who ride the line, the sculptures serve as a "metaphor for the human experience".

== Services ==
In 2018, Beaverton Transit Center was TriMet's busiest transit center, with 9,709 total weekday boardings for all modes in September 2018. In spring 2025, it was the agency's third-busiest, with 3,852 boardings for all modes. It is currently the only transit center in the network served by both MAX and WES.

=== Rail ===
Beaverton Transit Center is the 15th station eastbound on the Blue Line and the 11th station eastbound on the Red Line, situated between Beaverton Central station and Sunset Transit Center. The Blue Line connects the transit center westbound to Hatfield Government Center station in downtown Hillsboro and eastbound through Portland to Cleveland Avenue station in Gresham, while the Red Line connects the transit center westbound to Hillsboro Airport/Fairgrounds station in Hillsboro and eastbound through Portland to Portland International Airport station.

MAX trains serve the transit center for approximately 22 hours a day from Monday to Thursday; they run slightly later on Fridays and Saturdays and end earlier on Sundays. Headways measure from as little as five minutes during weekday rush hour up to 30 minutes in the early mornings and late evenings. For most of the day, service runs every fifteen minutes. MAX trains take approximately 25 minutes to reach Pioneer Square in downtown Portland, 30 minutes to downtown Hillsboro, 65 minutes to Portland International Airport, and 75 minutes to Gresham. The last eastbound and westbound trains are Blue Line services. The MAX station recorded 4,554 average weekday boardings in fall 2018, the second-busiest in the system after Gateway/Northeast 99th Avenue Transit Center.

Beaverton Transit Center is the northern terminus of WES, which connects Beaverton to Tigard, Tualatin, and Wilsonville. The next station southbound is Hall/Nimbus, which is also located in Beaverton. WES operates only on weekdays during the morning and evening rush hour commutes. WES trains run approximately every 45 minutes during service hours.

=== Bus ===
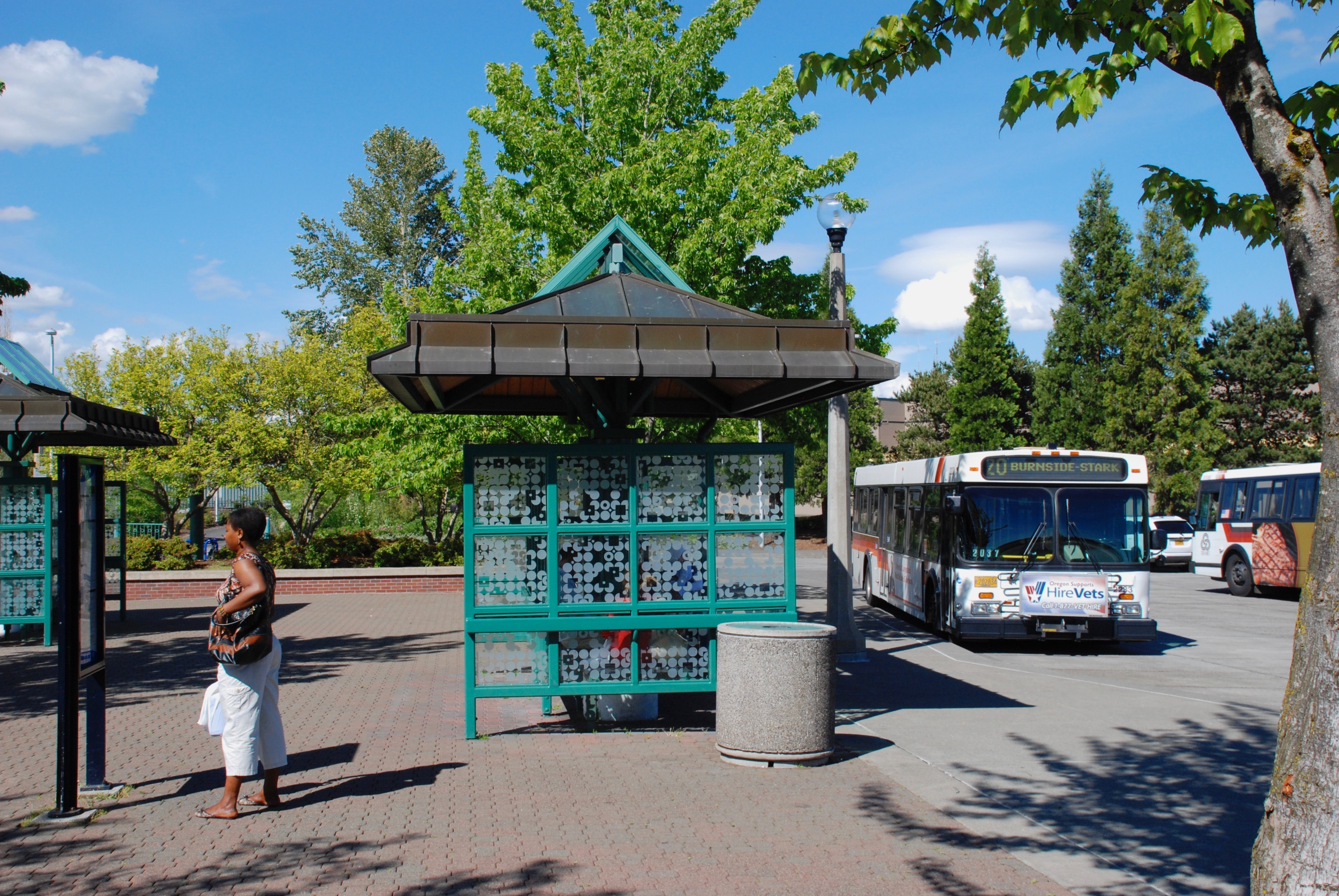
Northeast end of the bus section of the transit center with one of several bus-stop shelters in the 1988-opened facility

A majority of the bus routes with stops at Beaverton Transit Center serve the westside communities of Washington County and downtown Portland. An exception to this is route 20–Burnside/Stark, which continues east from downtown across the Willamette River to Gresham. As of August 2023, the following TriMet bus lines serve the transit center:

- 19–Glisan/Canyon Rd
- 52–Farmington/185th
- 53–Arctic/Allen (temporary reroute to Millikan Way MAX Station during transit center construction)
- 54–Beaverton–Hillsdale Hwy
- 57–TV Hwy/Forest Grove
- 76–Hall/Greenburg
- 78–Denney/Kerr Pkwy
- 88–Hart/198th

Discontinued 8/23/26

- 58 - Canyon Rd

==== Former SMART service ====
In August 2013, Wilsonville's South Metro Area Regional Transit (SMART) began operating route 8X, an express bus route that connected Beaverton Transit Center with SMART's Wilsonville Transit Center. Only one scheduled trip per day ran in each direction, in the early morning and late evening. In October 2014, the late-night route was changed to one going via downtown Portland to Beaverton Transit Center and numbered 9X. These routes were intended to provide some service at times when WES was not operating (during rush hours, WES connects the same two points; the SMART transit center is at WES's Wilsonville station). The service was discontinued in September 2016.

== See also ==
- List of TriMet transit centers
