= Brooklyn Subdivision =

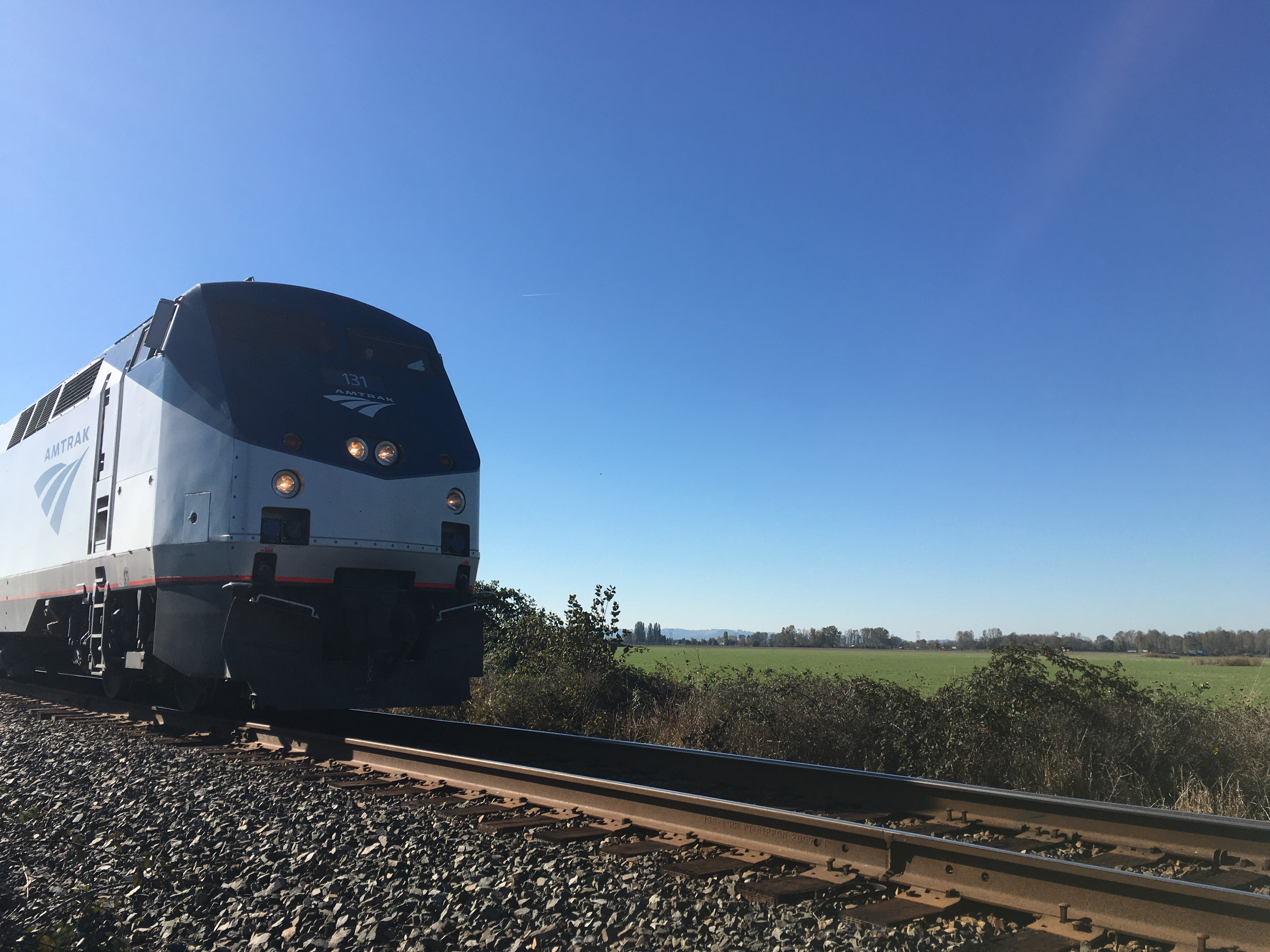
Amtrak on Brooklyn Subdivision outside of Keizer, Oregon

The Brooklyn Subdivision is a Union Pacific Railroad (UP) line in Oregon. The route stretches from Portland, south to Oakridge, in the foothills of the Cascade Range. The line was originally completed by the Southern Pacific Railroad on December 31, 1900.

UP freight trains run on the route. The route is also used by Amtrak passenger trains, with Cascade Corridor trains running between Portland and Eugene. The Coast Starlight continues through Oakridge on the way to and from California via the Cascade Subdivision. As of 2003 the line sees 20 trains daily.

== See also ==
- Glossary of rail transport terms
- History of the Union Pacific Railroad
- Union Pacific Portland Subdivision
