= Railroad cutoff =

Rail line to replace or supplement existing ones

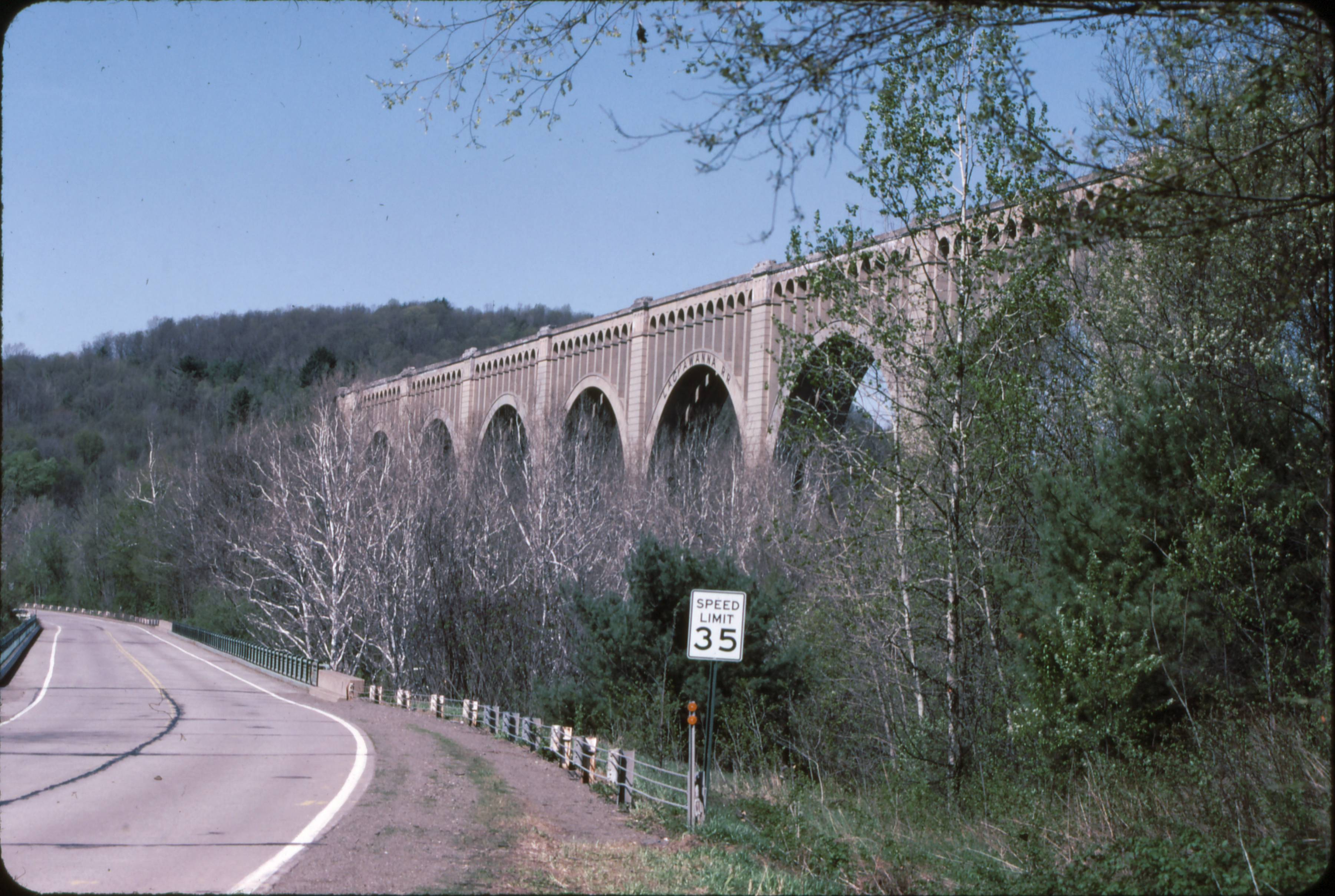
Nicholson Cutoff (which travels over the Nicholson Viaduct in this 1989 photo) replaced an old route whose right-of-way now carries U.S. Route 11, the roadway shown in the foreground.

A railroad (or railway) cutoff (or cut-off) is a new railroad line built to replace or supplement an existing route, typically one where the old line is deficient for some reason.

== Reasons and types ==
The term "cutoff" refers to the fact that the new line cuts off distance (and/or time) and is, therefore, shorter distance-wise (or time-wise) than the old line. This is often the case, although the primary reason for building the cutoff may be to create a line with a better gradient profile, or other desirable features usually related to efficiency of operation that are lacking in the old line rather than merely shortening the distance between two endpoints. Bypassing a congested area, such as a city or railroad station, or a section of track with an already-existing high volume, is an additional reason to construct a new line. The building of a high-speed line to replace a lower-speed line is another possibility; one example of this is the New Lower Inn Valley railway in Austria. A "railroad bypass" is generally synonymous with a railroad cutoff, although there are examples, such as with the Berlin Outer Ring Railway in Germany, where the bypass route was built more for political reasons than operational ones.

Although some cutoffs, such as the Lucin Cutoff, may run 100 miles (160 km) or more in length, there are cutoffs that are quite short, 1 mile (1.6 km) or less in length. The replacement of the old line is usually only considered by the railroad or funding-entity if both of the following conditions are met: (1) the future economic benefit of building a new line—usually for operational capacity or efficiency reasons—far exceeds that of continuing to solely use the old line; and (2) the upgrading of the old line is deemed impractical and will not provide sufficient operational capacity or benefits. If the operational problems are great enough, even a modest savings in distance between two endpoints may justify building a new line if other efficiencies can be gained. For instance, significant improvement in grades and/or curvature may justify the construction of a new route. Such was the case with the building of the Nicholson Cutoff, which saved less than 10% in distance over the old route, but which eliminated numerous curves, a steep grade over a mountain, and a number of grade crossings. Tunnels on an existing route may be problematic and can greatly increase the attractiveness of building a bypass route. An example of this would be the Lackawanna Cut-Off, where the old route had two tunnels that as the railroad's business grew were becoming a detriment to the efficient operation of the railroad.

Geographic location of the new route may also justify a new route if it improves overall traffic flow or flexibility of operations on the railway line. An example of this would be the Trenton Cutoff, which saved significant travel time by bypassing the city of Philadelphia. Cutoffs are not necessarily built with the intent of tapping new markets, but that does not preclude the railroad from seeking new business on the new route. Although the old route being replaced may face abandonment due to the existence of a new line, this isn't always the case, as a new route may not be able to carry all the present or future traffic that would be diverted to it if the old route were closed. Even if the new route can accommodate all the traffic from the old route, there may be freight or passenger business on (or carried via) the old route that justifies its continued operation. In this scenario, the new route becomes a supplement to the old route rather than a replacement. An example of this would be the Edgewood Cutoff, which has served as a complement, rather than a replacement, to the old route.
