= Portland and Western Railroad =

Class II railroad in Oregon

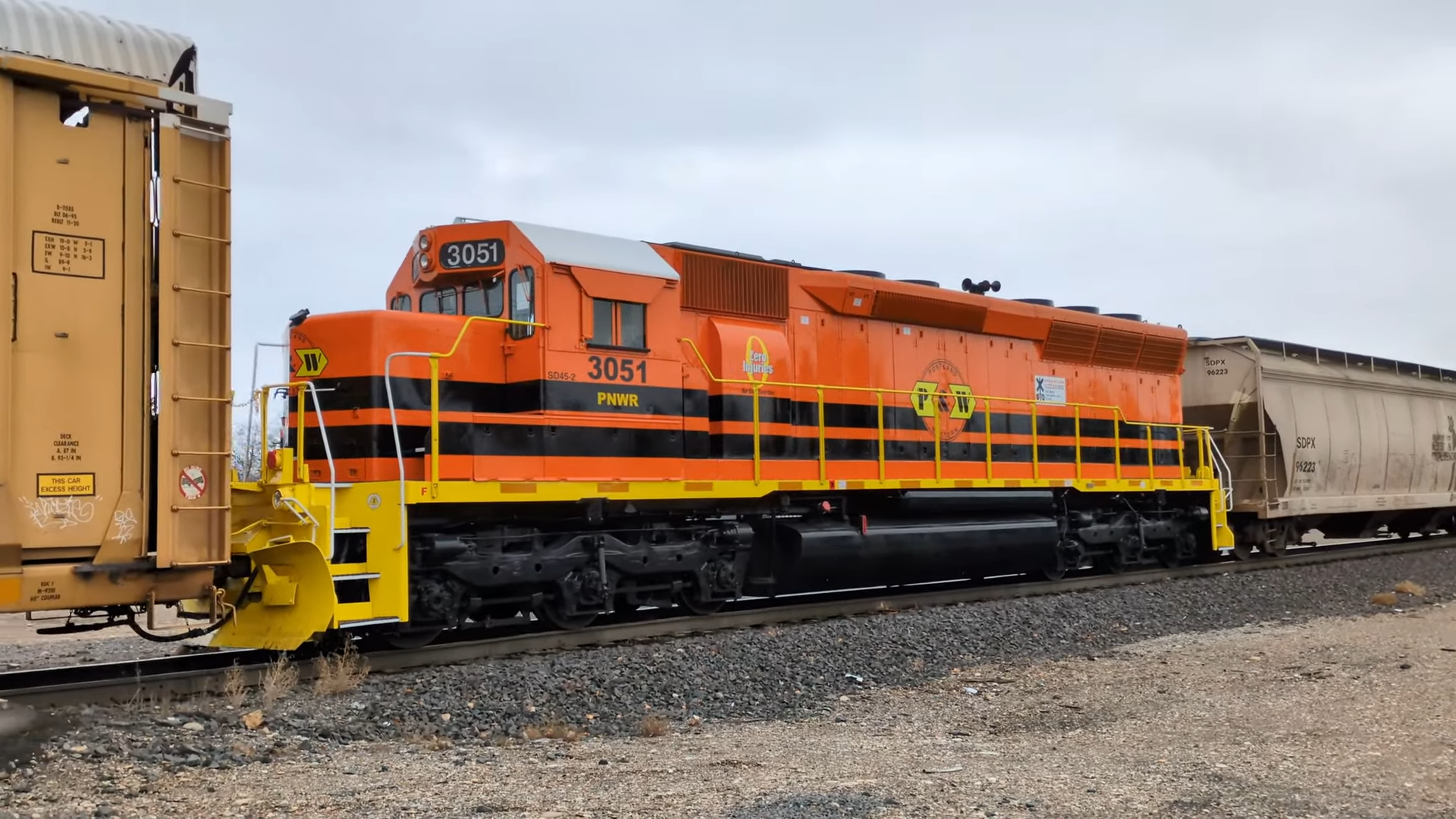
- P&W EMD SD40-3 #3051

Overview
- Parent company: Genesee & Wyoming
- Headquarters: Salem, Oregon
- Reporting mark: PNWR
- Locale: Oregon, United States
- Dates of operation: 1995–present

Technical
- Track gauge: 4 ft 8 1/2 in (1,435 mm) standard gauge
- Length: 478 miles (769 km)

Other
- Website: Official website

The Portland and Western Railroad (reporting mark PNWR) is a 478-mile (769 km) Class II railroad serving the U.S. state of Oregon, and is a wholly owned subsidiary of shortline and regional railroad holding company Genesee & Wyoming Inc. The PNWR includes a subsidiary, the Willamette and Pacific Railroad (reporting mark WPRR).

PNWR's tracks lie entirely within Oregon, extending from Astoria to Portland along the Columbia River, from Portland to Eugene through the Willamette Valley, and along several spurs through the Northern Oregon Coast Range.

== Founding ==
PNWR was created in 1995 to take over operations of the remainder of the SP's branch lines in the state consisting of the former Southern Pacific Tillamook Branch between Willsburg Junction (near Milwaukie) and Hillsboro, the Westside–Seghers Branch from Hillsboro to Seghers (near Gaston), and the remaining segment of the Newberg branch between Cook (near Tualatin) and Springbrook (near Newberg), connecting to the existing Willamette & Pacific network to McMinnville and Corvallis. The W&P had trackage rights on the Newberg branch and the portion of the Tillamook Branch between Cook and Willsburg Junction, along with trackage rights on a short portion of SP's mainline to Brooklyn Yard to facilitate interchange with SP; however, in the year before the P&W's formation, the W&P had been interchanging with SP exclusively through the Eugene Yard gateway.

The railroad's first day of operation was August 18, 1995, and it began with 52 miles (84 km) of line, leased from SP. Shortly after PNWR's startup, class one railroad Burlington Northern "spun off" part of its Oregon Electric Railway branch lines north of Salem to the new carrier. These included the remnants of the Forest Grove branch.

According to former WPRR/PNWR General Manager Robert I. Melbo, the Portland & Western was created to take over the new lines, rather than just extending the WPRR, due to regulatory issues then in force.

Most of the former SP branches are operated via a twenty-year lease agreement, which in the wake of the 1996 Union Pacific-Southern Pacific merger, are now held by UP. The operations of the former BN branches are mixed between leases and outright ownership.

Portland and Western filed to abandon the Forest Grove branch in 2023.

== Relationship with WPRR ==
Originally, the Portland & Western was operated as a "paper corporation". Its officers were the same as those of the sister WPRR, with which its lines are contiguous. WPRR locomotives and other equipment were used to operate the line, and the few locomotives painted and/or lettered for the PNWR were done as a publicity move. Operating crews were divided between the two companies, but in practice, crews of PNWR or WPRR would be used anywhere they were needed on the system.

The Portland & Western became the predominant corporate image in December 2000, to simplify branding, as well as operations and interchanging. Portland & Western became the "Operator" of the system while Willamette & Pacific remained in existence to retain ownership of assets. In a letter dated December 5, 2000, then General Manager of the railroad Bob Melbo stated "This is not an out and out merger of P&W and W&P. Rather, we are now using P&W as our principal corporate identity and are subjugating the W&P identity accordingly. P&W was picked because it did business with both UP and BNSF whereas W&P did business with just UP and didn't have a relationship with BNSF. " Everything from locomotives to letterheads began to bear the brand Portland & Western. In effect, the situation of 1995 has been reversed, and WPRR is now the paper corporation.

== System expansions ==
The combined PNWR/WPRR system has expanded rapidly. In 1997, PNWR acquired the "Astoria Line", running from Northwest Portland to Wauna from Burlington Northern. At nearly 92 miles in length, the line brought many paper, lumber, and chemical customers onto the system. In 2002, PNWR acquired a long-term lease of the remaining Burlington Northern branches in the state, giving the company access to Salem and Eugene via its own tracks. The acquisition of the former allowed PNWR to make through movements from its Portland-area lines to its central yard at Albany without routing over the steep and curvy Rex Hill.

== Traffic base ==
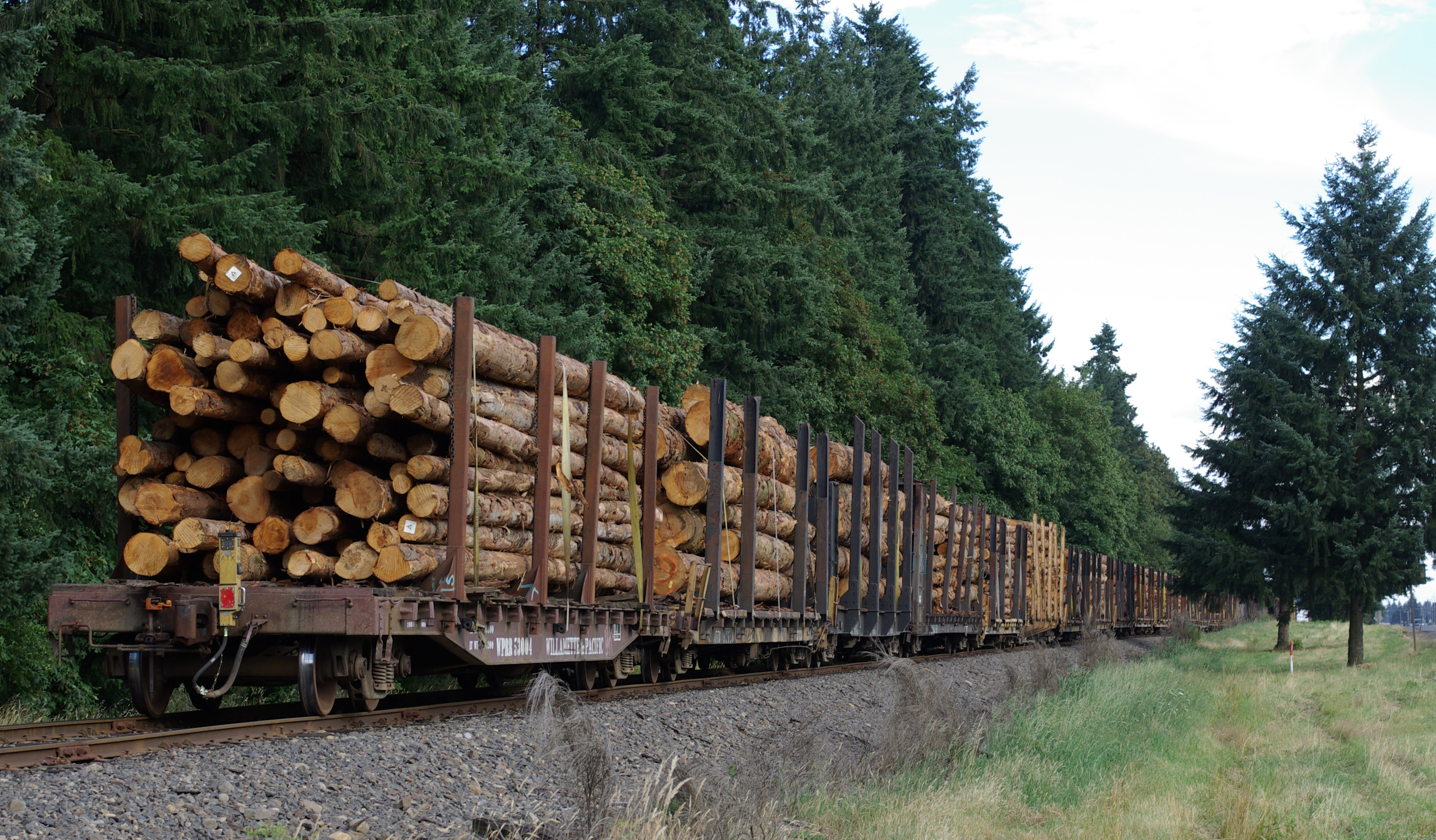
Log train originating in Rainier, Oregon

PNWR has a diverse traffic base based on carload commodities. Woodchips, paper, agricultural goods, and aggregates are all major sources of traffic. Primary amongst the road's over 135 customers are Georgia Pacific, Stimson Lumber Company, Cascade Steel Rolling Mills, and Hampton Lumber Sales. PNWR handles over 90,000 carloads annually.

Two other shortlines which interchange with PNWR are of note.

The first is the Albany and Eastern Railroad a subsidiary of the Rick Franklin Corporation, which interchanges solely with the PNWR. This shortline is in part the Southern Pacific line to Detroit, Oregon as well as the Spokane, Portland and Seattle Ry's line to Sweet Home, Oregon. This line carries lumber and scrap steel. The Rick Franklin Corp also operates a railroad maintenance service that is based out of Lebanon, Oregon.

The second is the Central Oregon and Pacific Railroad, a subsidiary of GWI. Although CORP and PNWR cross each other in Eugene, Oregon, operating agreements with Union Pacific prevented the two railroads from interchanging traffic directly. Congestion problems experienced by UP in 2004 resulted in a new agreement allowing direct interchange, creating a new traffic flow on PNWR. Today, PNWR handles a great deal of log traffic from a log import-export firm on its lines in Rainier, Oregon, clear across the entire system to an interchange with CORP at Eugene.

Up until 2007, a third shortline interchanged with the PNWR. This was the Port of Tillamook Bay Railroad, which interchanged with PNWR solely, at Hillsboro. This line carried a significant number of carloads, primarily lumber, from Tillamook, Oregon, over the coast range via 100 miles of winding mountain railway. The POTB line was severely damaged by a major storm in 2007 and is out of service indefinitely, west of Banks. The Port of Tillamook Bay lease the 3.5-mile (5.6 km) section of track from Banks to Hillsboro to PNWR. As of 2025, the PNWR system map does not show any interchange with POTB.

== Operations ==
PNWR operates between 20 and 30 trains per day over its system. PNWR's main yard and shop complex are all located in Albany. Additional crew bases in St. Helens, Tigard, McMinnville, and Eugene. Executive offices are maintained in Salem. As of 2008 P&W is operating with an interim President and General Manager. A. Bruce Carswell resigned from the post in November 2008, replacing Larry Phipps, who retired in November 2005, who had replaced Robert I. Melbo who was WPRR/PNWR's first President and General Manager, having previously been the Superintendent of the Southern Pacific's Oregon Division which operated many of the lines before the WPRR was formed.

Primary trains on the system are the "Harbor Turn/Albany Turn" pair, which runs from Portland through to Albany; the "Toledo Hauler", running from Albany over the Coast Range to Toledo; the "Eugene Hauler", from Albany to a Eugene interchange with UP over UP trackage rights; the "Westsider" running from Albany to McMinnville; and the Albany Hauler from Albany to a CORP interchange at Eugene, via the PNWR's leased BN trackage. In 2006, PNWR took over the operation of the 663/664 train pair from BNSF Railway. These trains run between Vancouver, WA and Albany, and are PNWR's first to regularly operate outside of Oregon. They alternately use the Oregon Electric District out of Portland and a nearby Union Pacific line between Portland and Salem under an inherited trackage rights agreement. As of 2008, PNWR was operating run-through unit trains with grain from the BNSF to and from Port Westward on the Astoria Line west of Rainier. These trains currently run with BNSF locomotives.

== Accidents and incidents ==
- On January 5, 2025, a PNWR train derailed as the bridge trestle over the Marys River in Corvallis collapsed. At least one train car carrying urea (as pellitized fertilizer) fell into the river. The trestle had caught fire in May 2022.
- On January 21, 2026, PNWR 3002, 102, and 3571, three locomotives operating on the PNWR's Toledo patch train, derailed on a trestle bridge in Toledo, Oregon. The cause of the incident was from a broken rail on the bridge

== Locomotive fleet ==
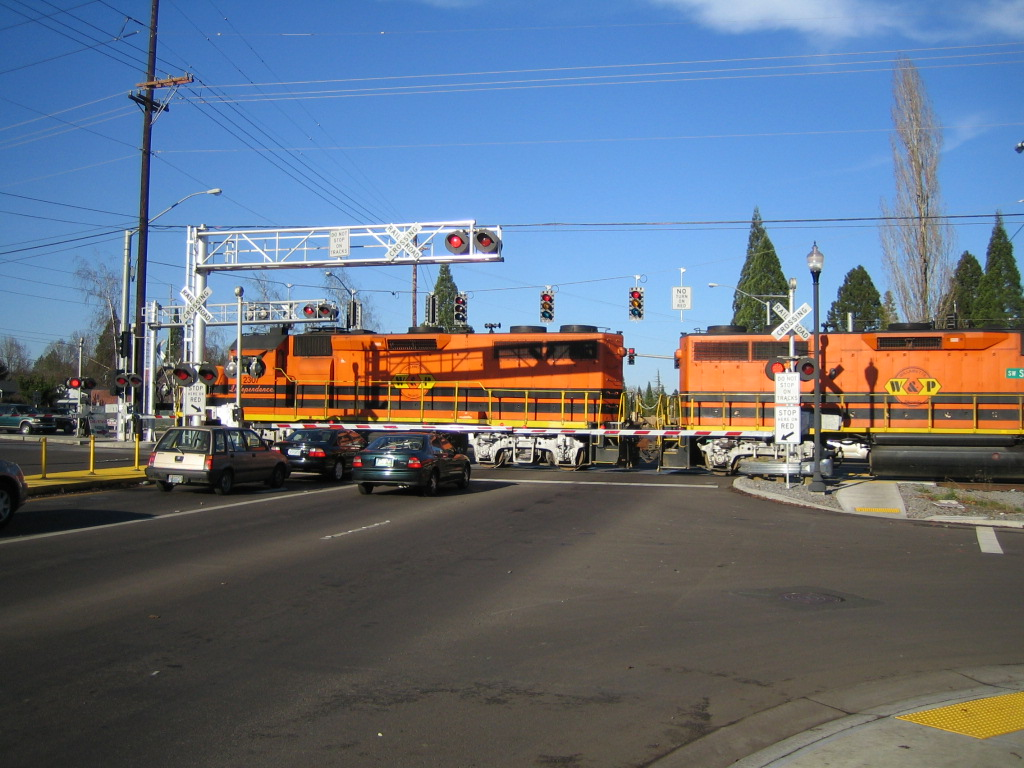
Two standard-fare Portland and Western locomotives in Beaverton, Oregon

The locomotive fleet of the PNWR/WPRR primarily consists of used "second generation" and used five “first generation” products of General Motors Electro-Motive Division. Notable exceptions in the fleet include a handful of GP/SD9 locomotives which are now 60+ years old and still in regular service, as well as an SD7. PNWR also operated a few unique locomotives, including the former PNWR 3300 (which was an EMD SD40-3MR), as well as one of the last remaining SDP40Fs, DLMX 644, as well as RSD-5, DLMX 324.

The 17 GP39-2 units, numbered 2301-2317, were originally built as ATSF units 3600-3616. WPRR (later PNWR) bought 17 of these locomotives in 1993 for expansion while the others became BNSF units. Units 2303 (now repainted into G&W colors), 2306, 2308, 2311, and 2312 are still in the ATSF Yellowbonnet paint with some having the P&W logos while the others have been repainted into G&W colors. Unit 2311 went on the CORP in early 2021 and returned in late 2021.

As of late 2014, PNWR 3300 was sold to The Andersons as AEX 100020, and later to Progress Rail as of 2020 and is now used for export.

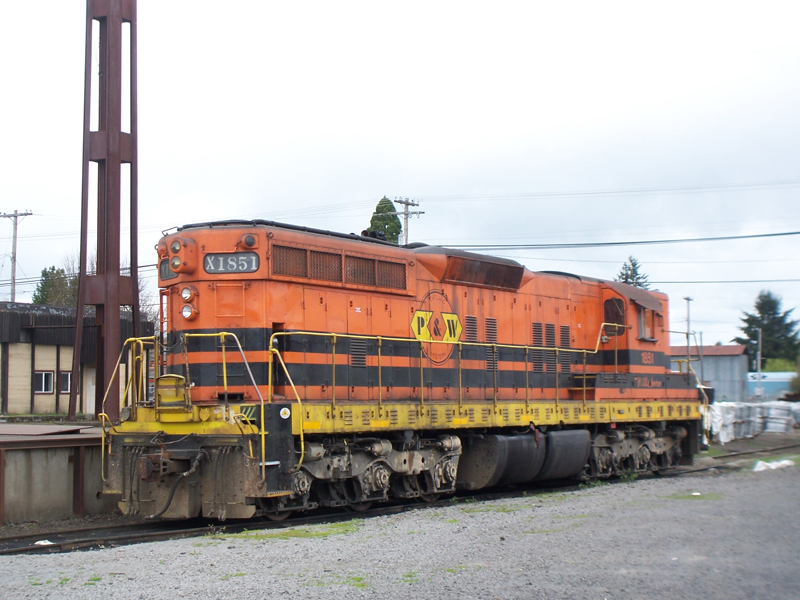
P&W EMD SD9 #1851 on March 31, 2007

PNWR 1851 was sold to Rick Franklin Corporation (RFC) and scrapped on July 25, 2012. PNWR 1853 was involved in an accident in Sheridan on October 31, 2009, the Willamina Local colliding with a standing train. No one was injured but 1853 suffered a bent frame that doomed its future. Although the WPRR roundhouse tried to keep it around, the bend put the main generator out of alignment. 1853 was scrapped on December 8, 2009, at the PNWR's Albany yard.

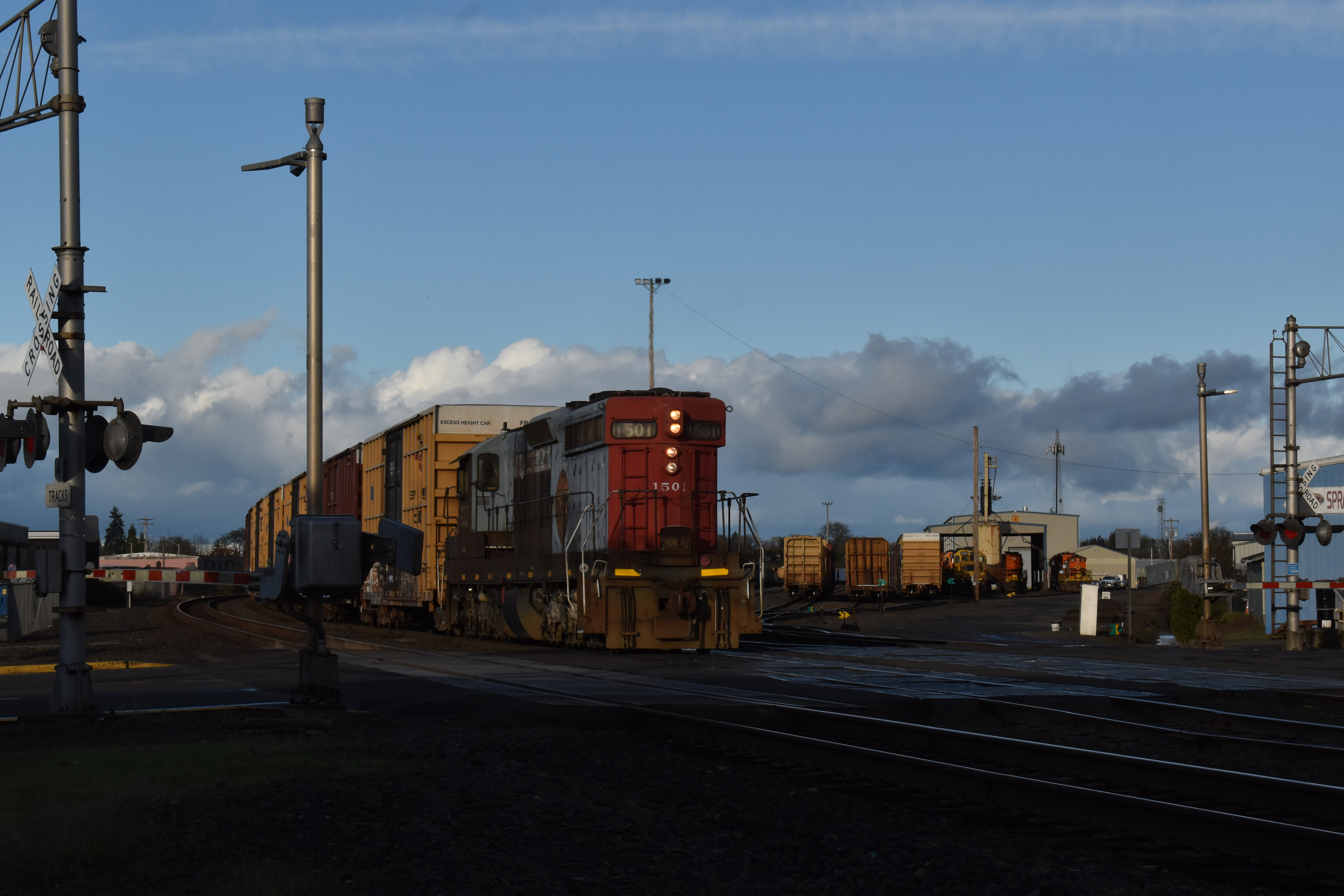
PNWR 1501, an EMD SD7 formerly used by PNWR, now sold to BUGX.

Locomotives 1501, 1801, 1803, 1852 and 1854 were all retired from the PNWR and were originally meant to be scrapped by the railroad’s parent company Genesee and Wyoming as part of a fine resolution agreement with the EPA. But units 1501, 1801, 1803 and 1852 have been sold to BUGX and unit 1854 was donated to the Oregon Rail Heritage Foundation (ORHF), and is currently stored on the Albany and Eastern Railroad (AERC) until the ORHF has enough space. GP40P-2 3001 and RP-E4D 101 were scrapped at RFC on September 15, 2023.

Two of the PNWR GP40s were retired, with PNWR 3007 being sold to Rapid City, Pierre and Eastern Railroad (RCPE) in 2021 and 3006 being sold to Utah Railway in 2023. Both units kept these numbers. The rest of the GP40s, which are numbered 3003−3005 are currently awaiting disposition.

The final SW9 (later rebuilt into an SW1200m), numbered 1201, was retired in 2019 and was sold to AERC and then renumbered to 1866 in 2021.

== Commuter rail ==
The PNWR line between Beaverton and Wilsonville is leased to TriMet for the operation of its Westside Express Service (WES) commuter rail service. PNWR freight trains also continue to use the line, but not during times when the passenger trains are operating. Under a contract with TriMet, the rail cars are operated by PNWR crews.

Begun in the 1990s and originally led by Washington County, the commuter-rail project was taken over by TriMet in 2002, and the regional transit agency entered into an agreement with PNWR for the use of its right-of-way, and later for the operation of the rail cars. During construction in 2007–2008, the section involved was upgraded for use by commuter trains. Upgrades included a new roadbed, ballast, ties and rail to accommodate passenger train speeds of 60 MPH and freight train speeds of 40 MPH, Centralized Traffic Control signaling, Automatic Train Control at control points, new sidings, station platforms at the endpoints along with intermediate stations in Tigard, Oregon and Tualatin, Oregon, and in the Progress/Washington Square area near the Beaverton/Tigard city line, and a maintenance shop located in Wilsonville (staffed by TriMet employees). In Beaverton, TriMet also constructed a new 1,700-foot (520 m) spur off of the PNWR line, for exclusive use by WES trains, running mostly along Lombard Avenue and connecting the freight line with the Beaverton Transit Center.

PNWR is responsible for train operations, including staffing the trains with an engineer and conductor, dispatching, and maintenance. TriMet has a manager to oversee the service and handles basic maintenance of the fleet and stations.

The service had been expected to launch as early as August 2008 but due to delays by the car manufacturer, Colorado Railcar, the actual start of service date was February 2, 2009. Four Colorado Railcar DMUs are used, three of which are powered vehicles and can move on their own, and a fourth vehicle which is a control trailer that is towed or pushed by one of the three powered cars. TriMet also acquired two former Alaska Railroad Rail Diesel Cars, or RDCs, in late 2009 and refurbished them to serve as a backup train on occasions when one or more of the DMUs are out of service.

Fares are handled off-board using ticket-vending machines at each stop, which will not allow for cash fares but only the use of a credit or debit card. Cash passengers have the option in Tigard and Beaverton to first board a bus at the transit center to pay for cash and obtain a transfer which will be valid on the train; in Tualatin and at Hall/Nimbus bus service is infrequent to accommodate this, and TriMet does not serve Wilsonville and thus a passenger in Wilsonville wanting to pay a cash fare will simply not be permitted to board unless they purchase a prepaid ticket or pass online, or at the Wilsonville Fred Meyer (30300 SW Boones Ferry Road).
