= Lake Grove, Oregon =

Neighborhood of Lake Oswego, Oregon, United States

Coordinates: 45°24′36″N 122°42′49″W

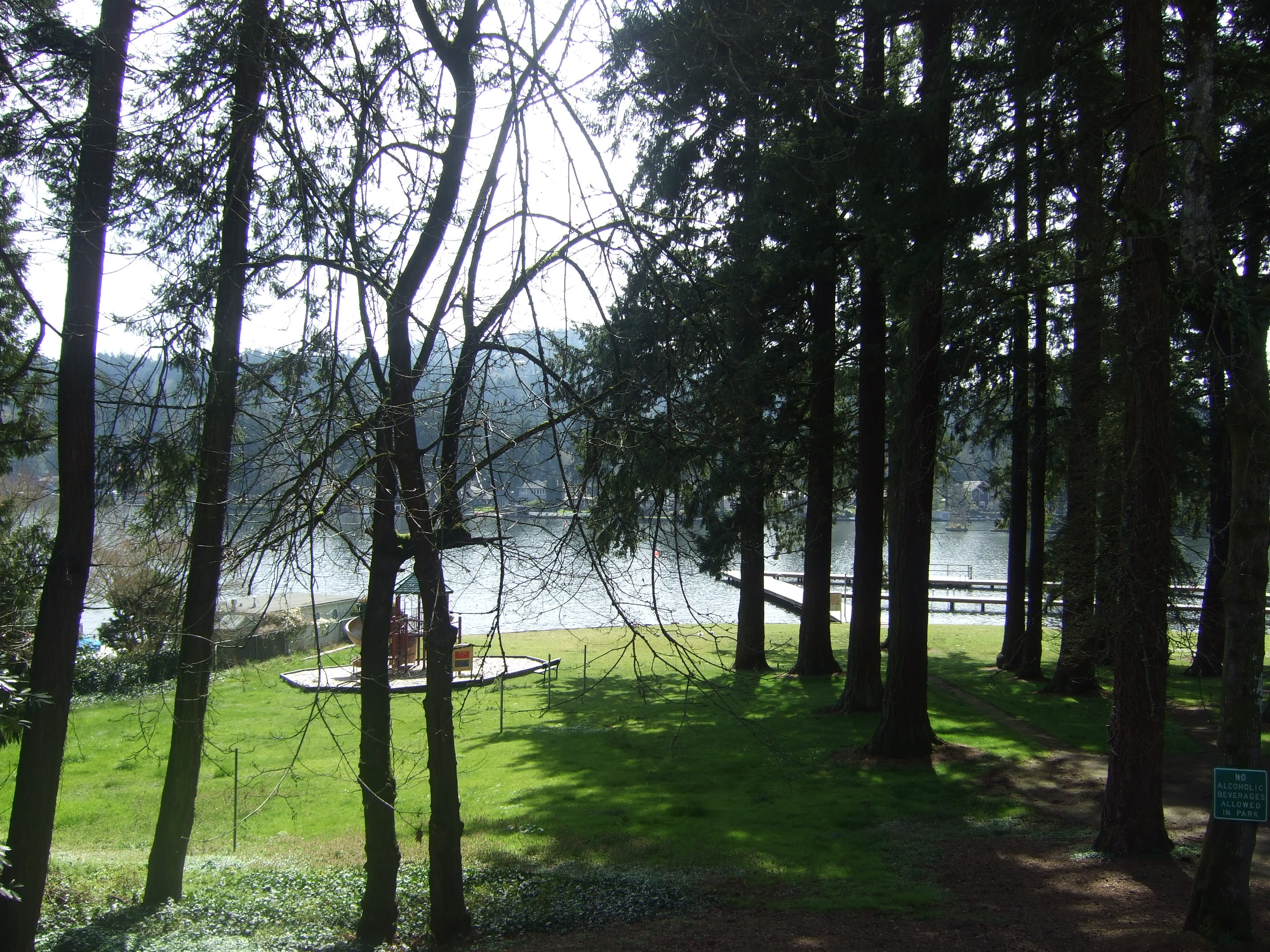
The Lake Grove Swim Park on the north shore of Oswego Lake.

Lake Grove is a neighborhood of Lake Oswego, Oregon, United States, located west of Oswego Lake, south of the Mountain Park neighborhood, east of Interstate 5, and north of Rivergrove.

== Description ==
Lake Grove was platted in 1912 as a development on the western end of Oswego Lake, near the railroad line. That line, the Portland, Eugene and Eastern Railway (PE&E), was part of the East Side Local route of the "Red Electric" passenger service beginning in 1914, a service continued by Southern Pacific after it bought PE&E a year later. A stop on that line, Goodin Station, connected the development with Tualatin to the west and Oswego and Portland to the east and north (the latter two connected using a line now used by the Willamette Shore Trolley).

In 1916, Waluga Post Office was established in the area, named after the native American name for Oswego Lake; the post office was renamed Lake Grove in 1923.

A May 1959 vote by residents of Oswego and Lake Grove resulted in the establishment of the city of Lake Oswego.

In the 1960s, Intercity Buses, Inc. provided transit service connecting Lake Grove with downtown Lake Oswego and downtown Portland through neighborhoods on both sides of the lake, until taken over in 1970 by TriMet, which continues to operate bus service through the area today.

As the area developed and the automobile became the dominant mode of transportation, Lake Grove's commercial and residential development continued along (Lower) Boones Ferry Road. That road remains the main artery of Lake Grove, a prominence reinforced by its central role in the Lake Grove Village Center, a Metro "Town Center" for 21st century land-use and transportation planning purposes.

Besides the town center, Lake Grove's identity is evident in the name of institutions such as Lake Grove Elementary School (which dates back to at least the 1920s), the Lake Grove Neighborhood Association (though parts of the Lake Grove area are within other neighborhood associations such as the Waluga), the Lake Grove Rural Fire District, the Lake Grove Water District and the Lake Grove Post Office serving ZIP code 97035. All these elements combined often give Lake Grove the feeling of being a separate town from Lake Oswego. Lake Grove was also part of the inspiration that led to the name of the small city of Rivergrove.

The Lake Grove Elementary School is located in this area, it has the most students and is the largest elementary school in the Lake Oswego School District.
