= TriMet =

Transit agency serving Portland, Oregon

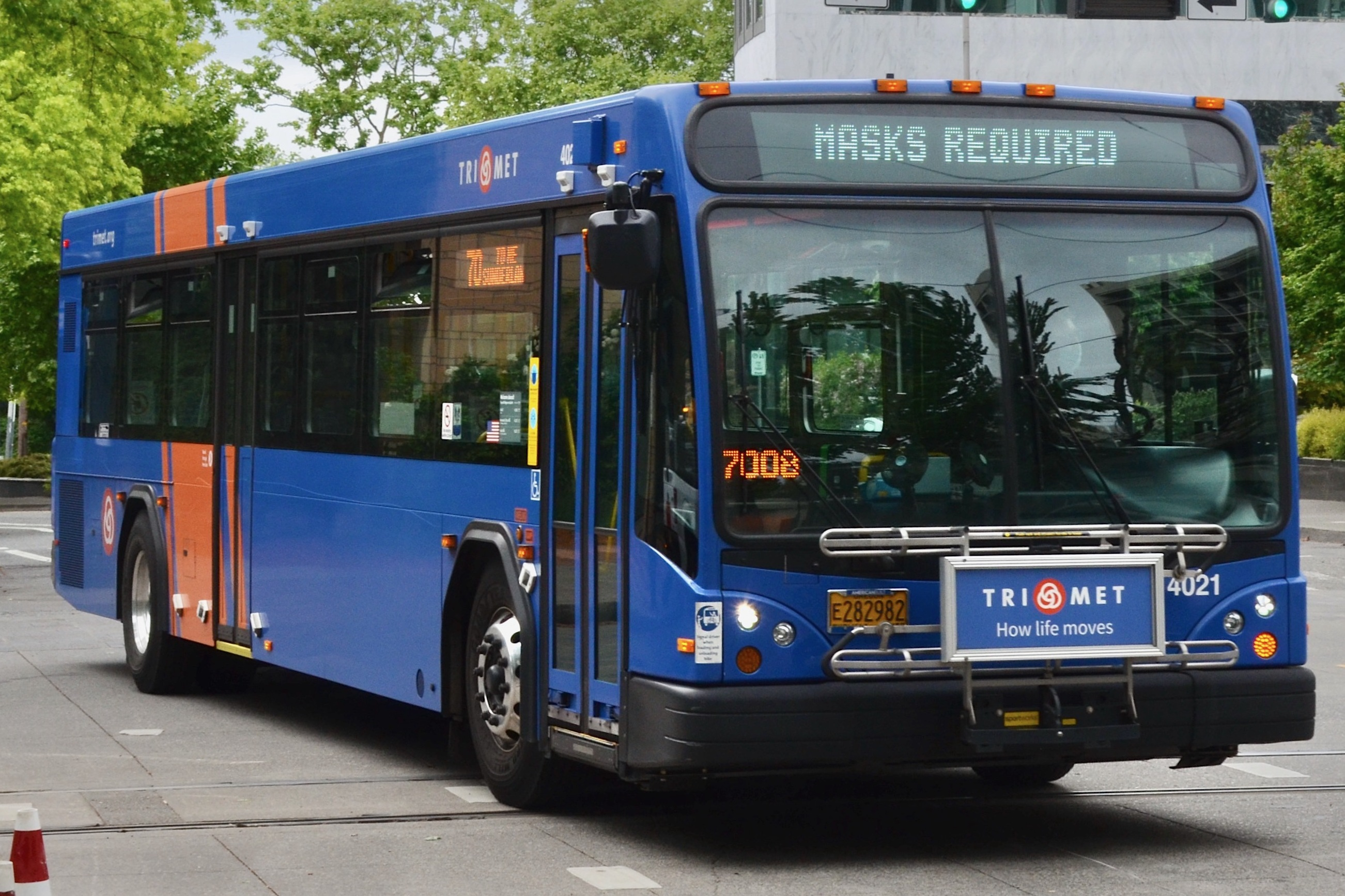
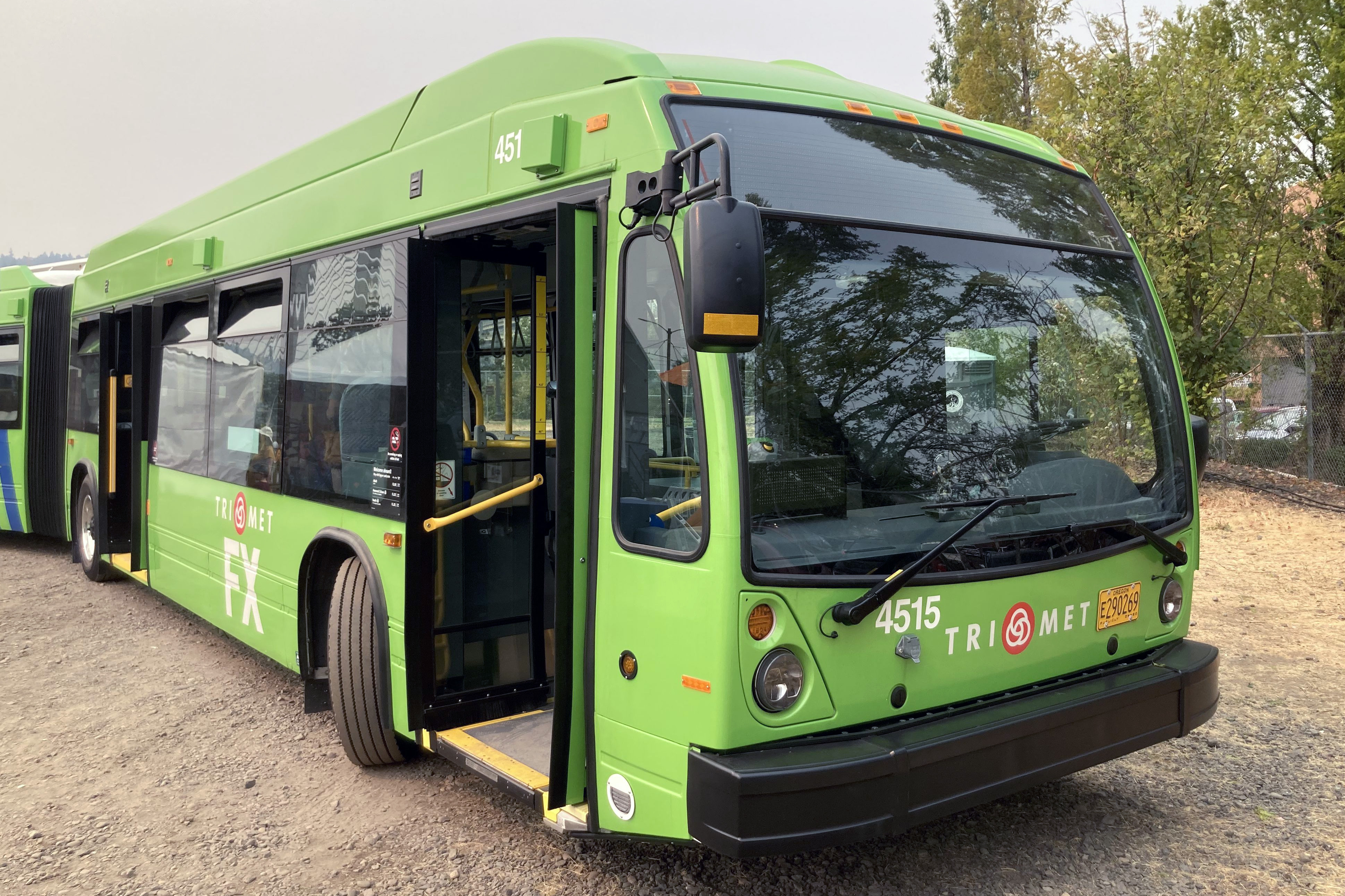
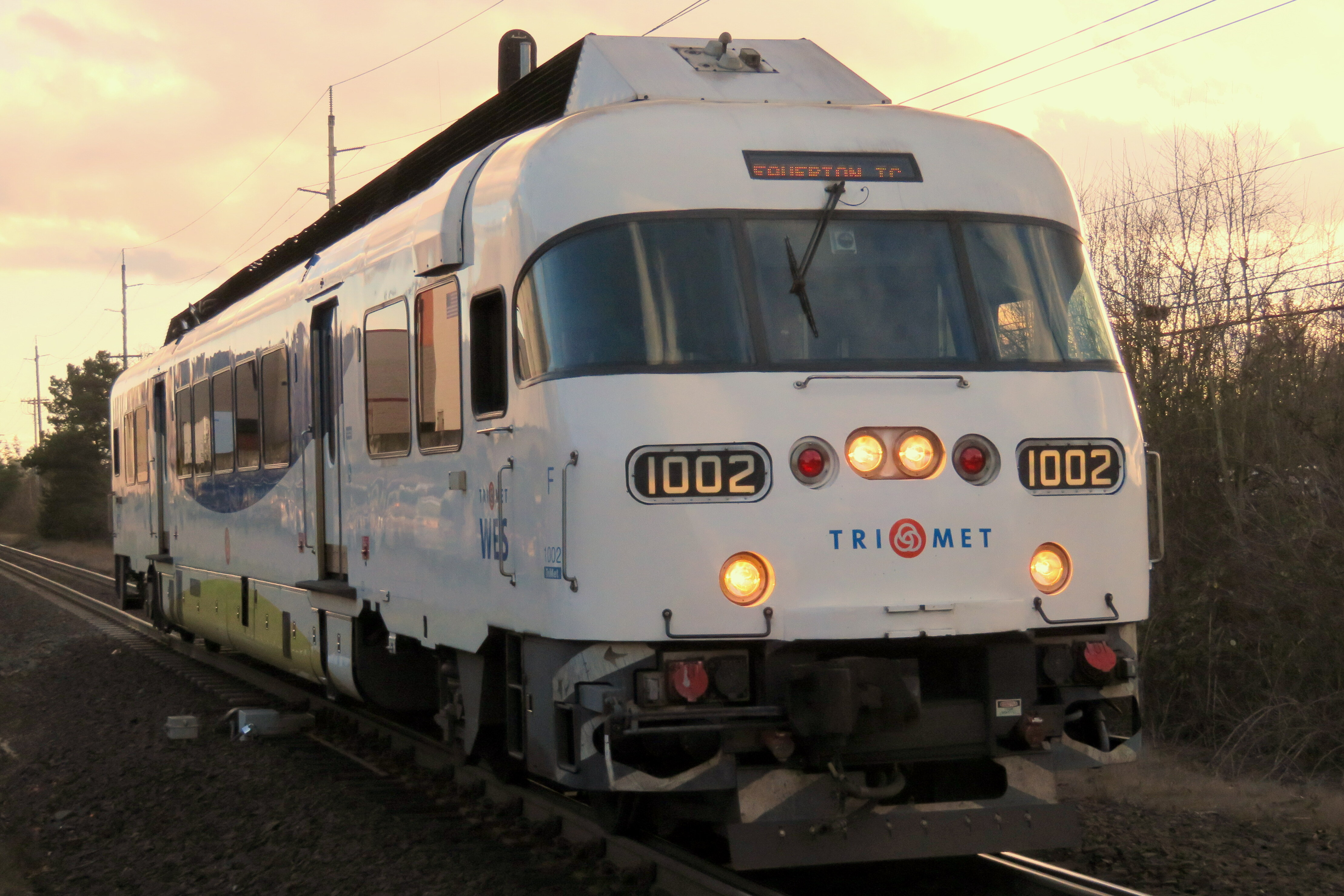
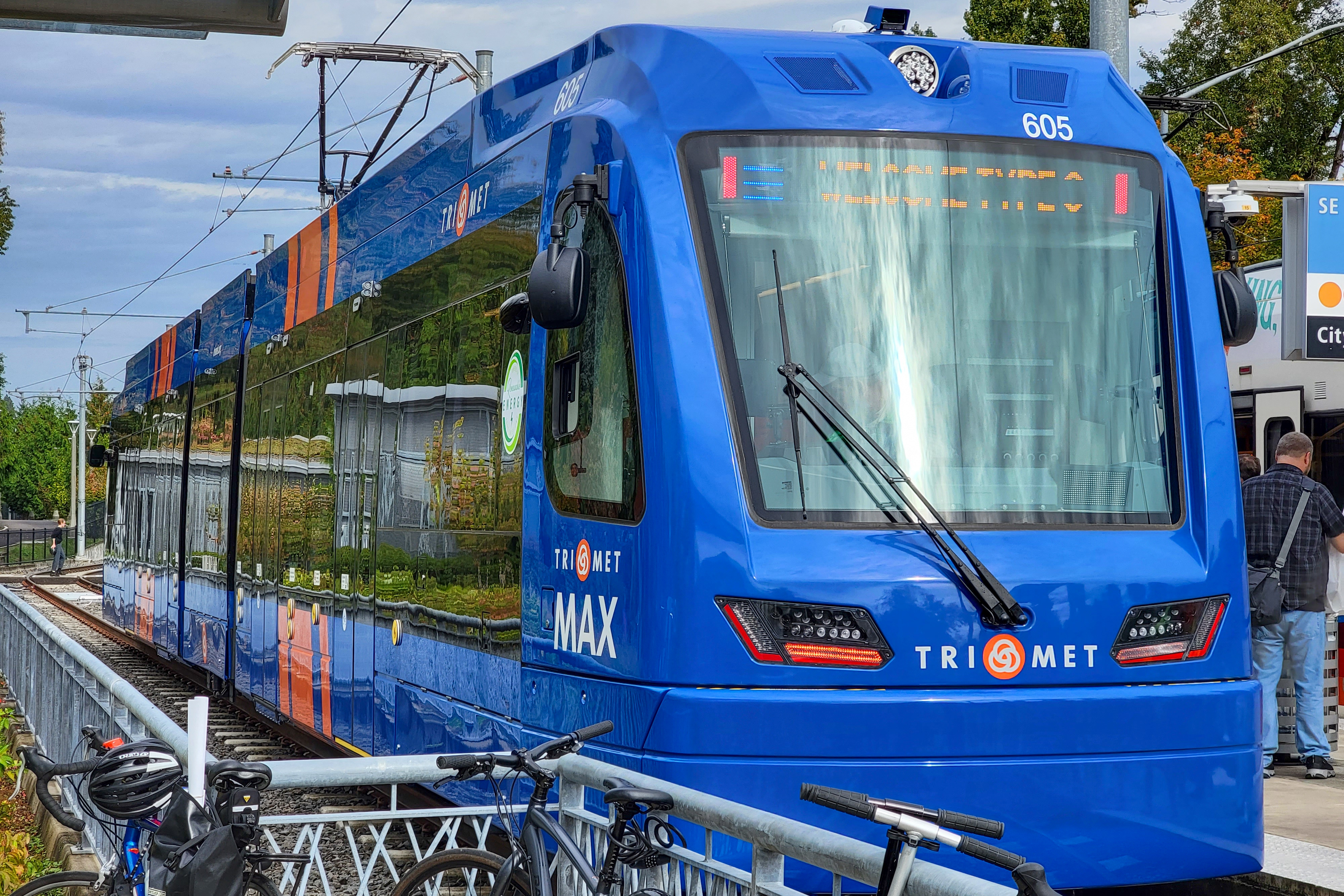
- TriMet's major forms of service, clockwise from top left: bus, Frequent Express bus, MAX Light Rail, and WES Commuter Rail.

Overview
- Locale: Portland metropolitan area, Oregon
- Transit type: Local bus; Light rail; Commuter rail
- Number of lines: Bus: 79; MAX Light Rail: 5; WES Commuter Rail: 1
- Number of stations: Light rail: 96; Commuter rail: 5
- Daily ridership: 209,800 (weekdays, Q2 2026)
- Annual ridership: 66,053,200 (2025)
- Website: trimet.org

Operation
- Began operation: December 1, 1969; 56 years ago
- Number of vehicles: Buses: 650+; Light rail: 145; Commuter rail: 6

Technical
- System length: Light rail: 60 mi (97 km); Commuter rail: 14.7 mi (23.7 km)
- Track gauge: 4 ft 8 1/2 in (1,435 mm) standard gauge

The Tri-County Metropolitan Transportation District of Oregon, branded as TriMet, is a transit agency that serves most of the Oregon part of the Portland metropolitan area. Created in 1969 by the Oregon legislature, the district replaced five private bus companies that operated in the three counties: Multnomah, Washington, and Clackamas. TriMet began operating a light rail system, MAX, in 1986, which has since been expanded to five lines that now cover 59.7 miles (96.1 km). It also operates the WES Commuter Rail line since 2009. It also provides the operators and maintenance personnel for the city of Portland-owned Portland Streetcar system. In 2025, the system had a ridership of 66,053,200, or about 209,800 per weekday as of the second quarter of 2026.

In addition to rail lines, TriMet provides the region's bus system, as well as LIFT paratransit service. There are over 650 buses on 79 lines as of September 2025. In 2018, the entire system averaged 310,000 rides per weekday and operates buses and trains between the hours of approximately 5 a.m. and 2 a.m. TriMet's annual budget for FY 2025 is $990.5 million, with ~$540 million of revenue coming from taxes and ~$69 million from fares. The district is overseen by a seven-person board of directors appointed by the state's governor. As of 2025, the agency has around 3,737 employees.

== General information ==
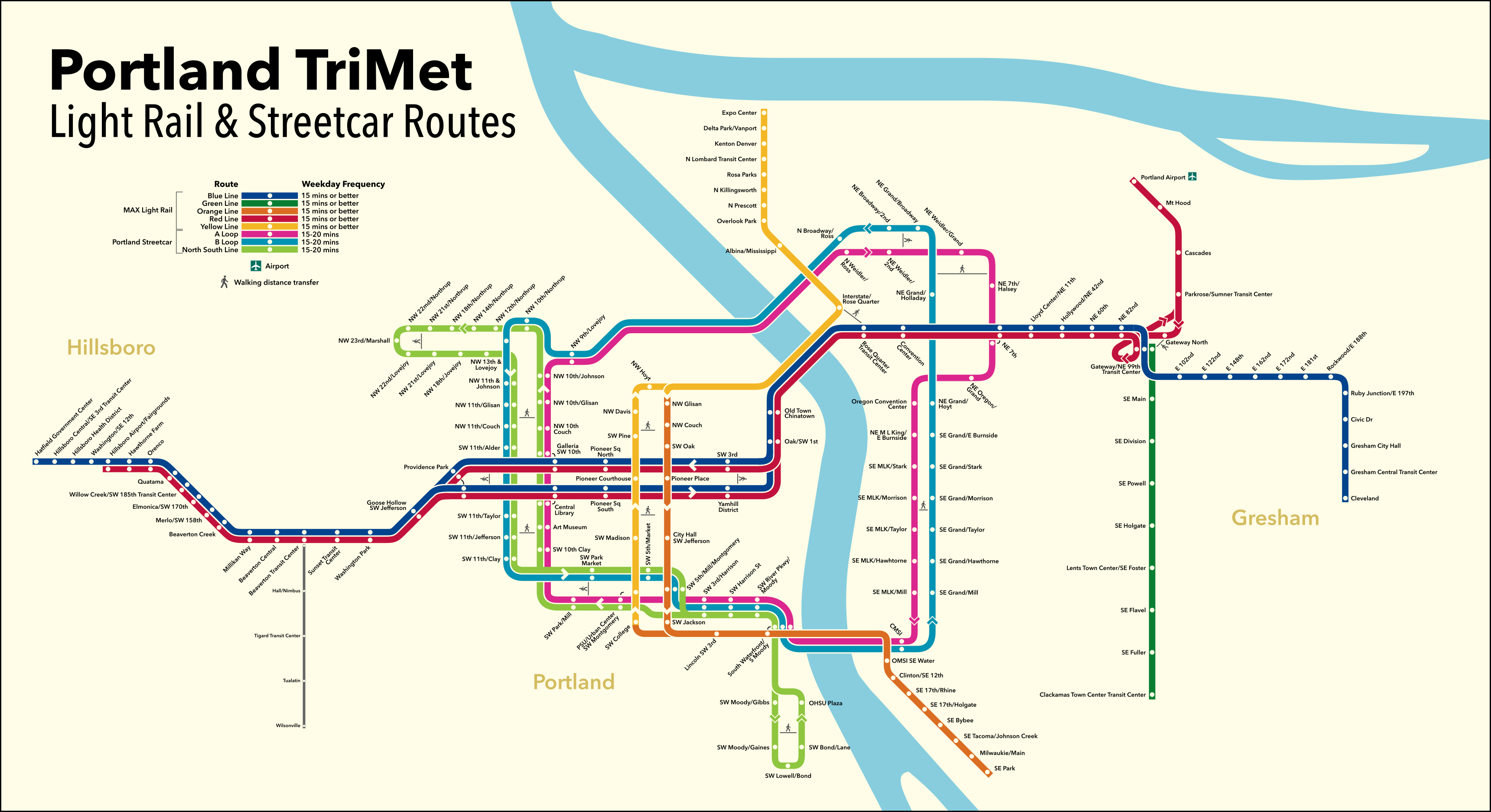
TriMet operates a light rail system (MAX Light Rail), the Portland Streetcar, and a commuter rail line (WES Commuter Rail).

TriMet is "a municipal corporation of the State of Oregon", with powers to tax, issue bonds, and enact police ordinances and is governed by a seven-member board of directors appointed by the Governor of Oregon. It has its own boundary, which currently encompasses an area of about 533 square miles (1,380 km^{2}). The TriMet district serves portions of the counties of Multnomah, Washington, and Clackamas; it extends from Troutdale to Forest Grove east to west, and from Sauvie Island to Oregon City and Estacada north to south.

For more than 30 years the agency called itself Tri-Met, but it formally dropped the hyphen from its name in 2002, as part of a new corporate identity strategy involving a redesigned logo and new color scheme for its vehicles and other media.

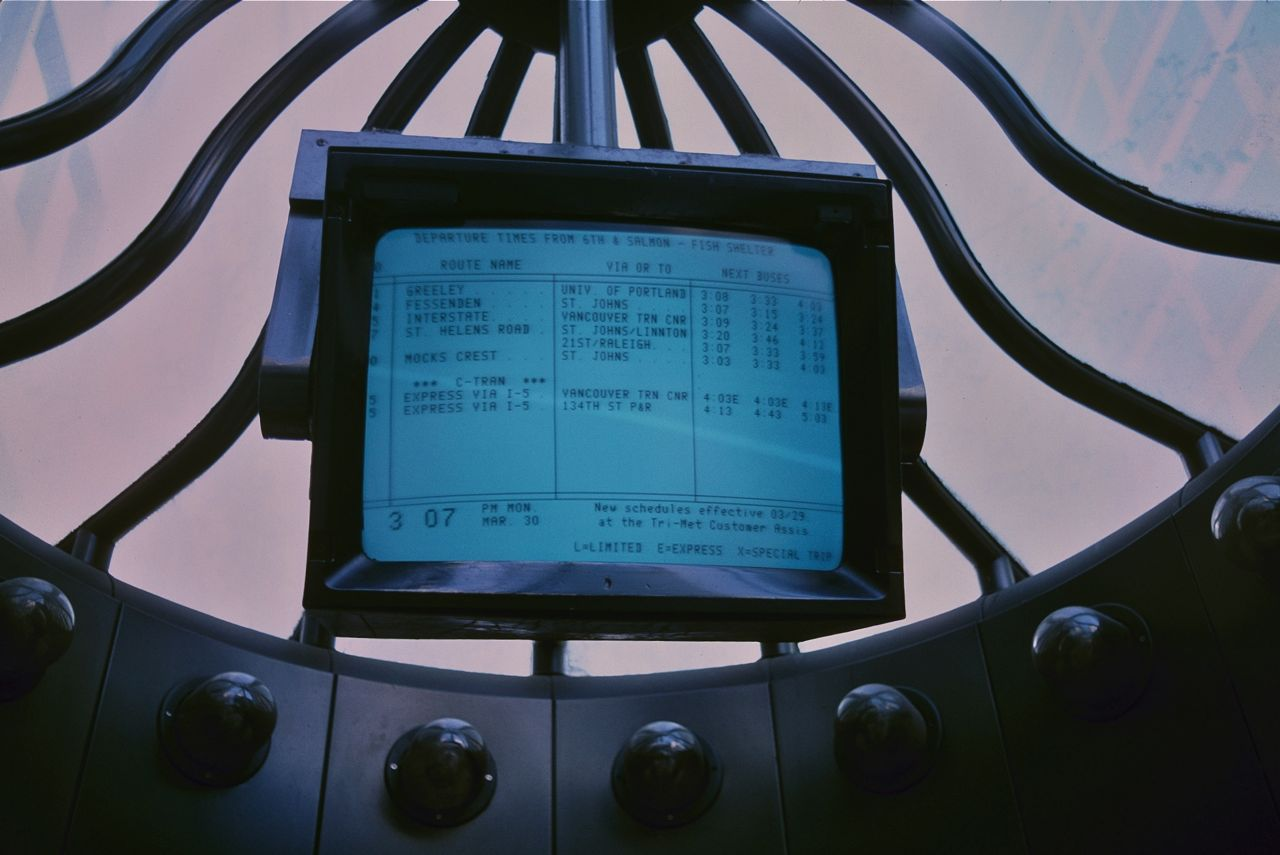
A now-obsolete closed-circuit television bus-schedule service on the Portland Mall in the 1980s

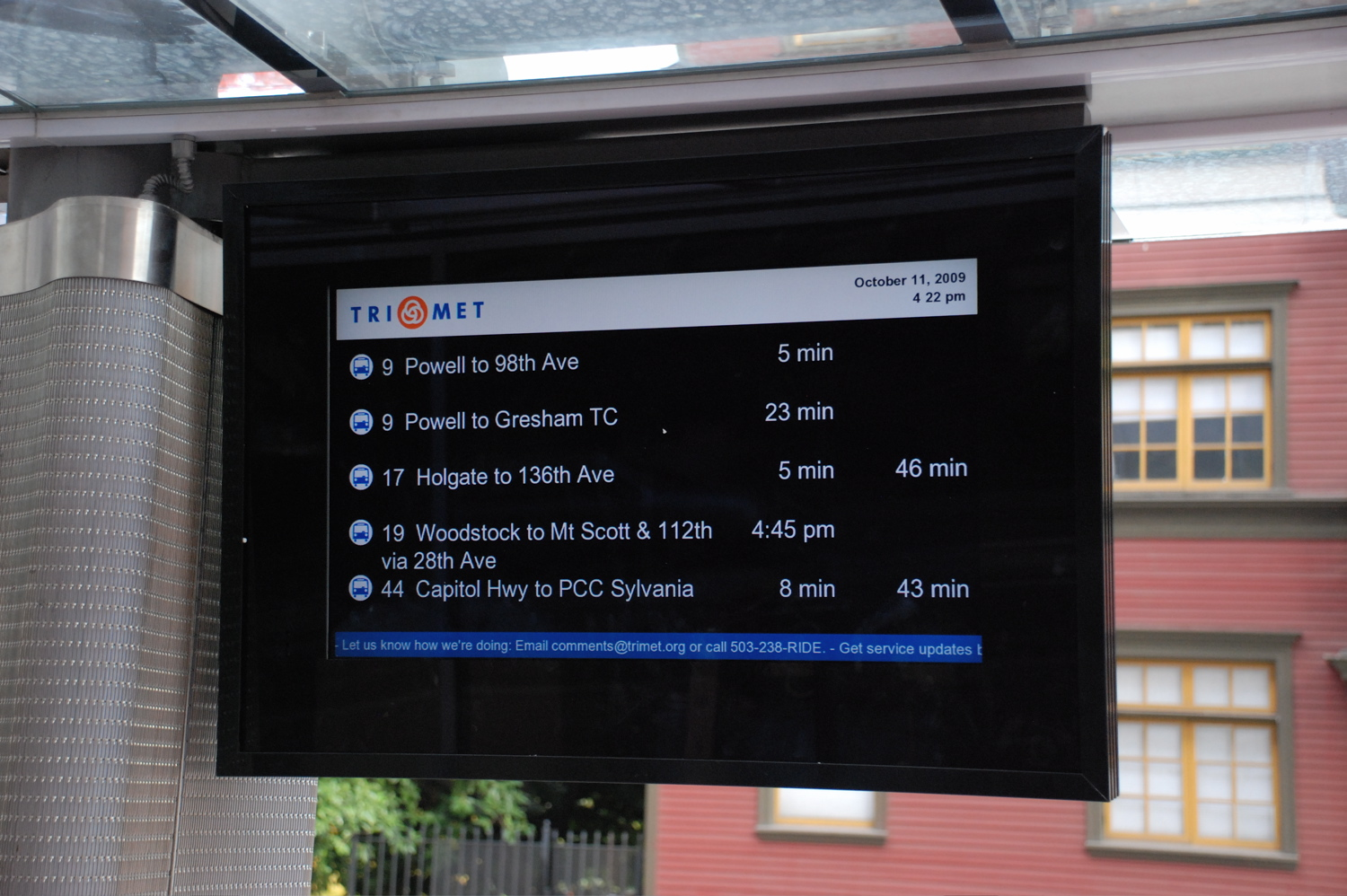
A real-time display of schedule information at a stop on the transit mall in 2009

TriMet was formed in 1969 after disputes between the Portland City Council and the Rose City Transit Company, the private company that previously operated the bus system serving the city (but not its suburbs). The new public agency was created by an ordinance of the Portland city council, under provisions of a law enacted by the 1969 Oregon Legislature, and took over all of Rose City Transit's service and fleet effective December 1, 1969. Bus service in the suburban portions of the metropolitan area was operated by four smaller private companies which had a common union and were collectively known as the "Blue Bus" lines: Portland Stages, Tualatin Valley Buses, Intercity Buses and Estacada-Molalla Stages. These were taken over by TriMet on September 6, 1970. Eighty-eight buses owned by the four suburban companies were transferred to TriMet, but many were found to be in poor condition and the TriMet board soon took action to replace them with new buses.

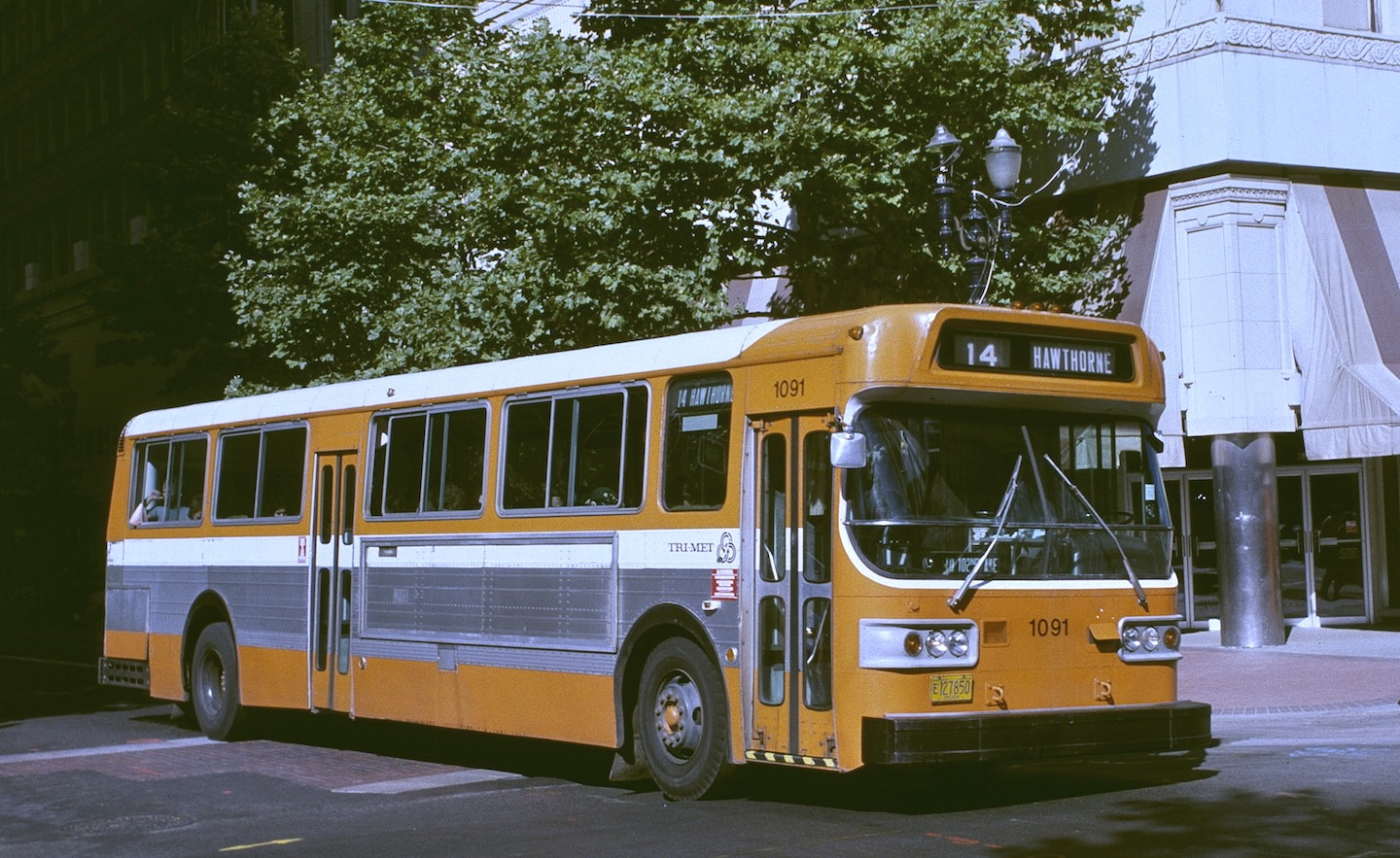
TriMet's first paint scheme was this orange and white, worn by all vehicles from 1971 until 1980 and by a portion of the fleet (the oldest buses) until 1991.

As of fiscal year 2026, TriMet operates a total of 669 buses on 79 routes, 149 MAX light rail cars on five lines, and 274 LIFT paratransit vehicles. Each of the five MAX lines and 17 of the bus lines are designated as "Frequent Service" lines, scheduled to operate at headways of 15 minutes or less seven days a week and for most of the service day (service is less frequent in the early morning and late evening). Five of the 79 total bus lines serve as late-night replacements for the Blue, Orange, Red, and Yellow MAX service during the night; this service change was implemented in August 2024 to allow more time for routine overnight maintenance on the MAX system.

TriMet connects to several other public transit systems:

- Portland Streetcar, a circulator streetcar service in downtown Portland and nearby neighborhoods
- C-Tran, serving Vancouver and Clark County, Washington
- Canby Area Transit, serving Canby and rural areas south of Oregon City along Highway 99E (formerly within the TriMet district)
- Cherriots, the public transit service for Salem and Keizer, connecting at the Wilsonville WES station
- Columbia County Rider, serving Scappoose, St. Helens, and Columbia County
- Sandy Area Metro, serving Sandy (formerly within the TriMet district)
- SMART, serving Wilsonville (formerly within the TriMet district)
- South Clackamas Transportation District, serving Molalla and rural areas south of Oregon City along Highway 213 (formerly within the TriMet district)
- Tillamook County Transportation District, serving Tillamook County
- Yamhill County Transit Area, serving Yamhill County

TriMet, Average Daily Ridership, All Modes, 2002–2016 Updated link:https://trimet.org/about/performance.htm

TriMet also links to various local shuttle services operated by the following: Ride Connection, which serves Banks, Gaston, King City and North Plains; the Swan Island Transportation Management Association; the Tualatin Transportation Management Association; Intel; Nike; and Oregon Health & Science University, including the Portland Aerial Tram.

Long-range transportation planning for the metropolitan area is provided by Metro, an elected regional government. Metro also has statutory authority to take over the day-to-day operations of TriMet, but has never exercised that power, as past studies of such a merger have found it to be problematic.

The agency's administrative headquarters was, for more than 40 years, located in Southeast Portland, at SE 17th Avenue and Center Street, the site of the largest of its three garages; the current office building at that site replaced an older one in 1978. In early 2013, the administrative offices were relocated to downtown Portland, to leased space in a building at SW 1st Avenue and Harrison Street known as Harrison Square, with the former administration building becoming TriMet's Operations Headquarters. The administrative offices were moved again in 2023, within downtown, to space in the One Main Place building.

== Rail lines ==
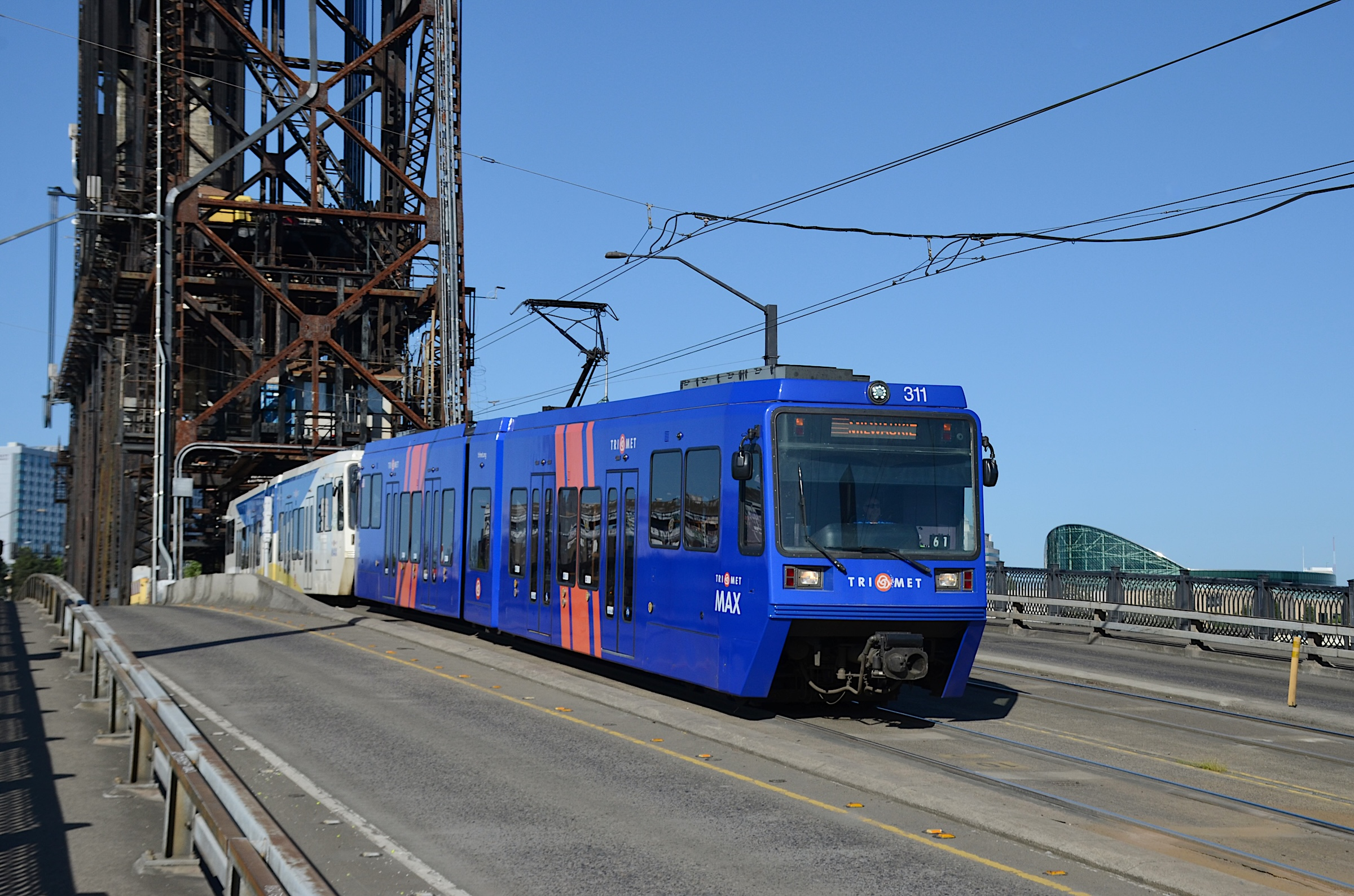
MAX train crossing the Steel Bridge

TriMet runs the MAX Light Rail (short for Metropolitan Area Express) system, and contracts with Portland and Western Railroad to operate the WES Commuter Rail line (short for Westside Express Service). Fares on MAX (as well as WES) are the same as TriMet bus fares, and fare collection uses a proof-of-payment system (or honor system) with ticket vending machines at each station. Fare inspectors patrol the system randomly. Incidents of violence on the system have led to calls for more security, and some have argued that more thorough checking of fares would improve riders' overall feeling of safety.

The TransitTracker system uses satellite tracking on buses and sensors in the MAX tracks to predict arrival times at stops and stations. Additionally, TriMet is partnering with Google Maps to install Bluetooth low energy beacons on MAX platforms, allowing nearby Android device users to directly receive schedule and alert information.

TriMet trains operate using reporting mark TMTC.

TriMet's rail lines include:

TriMet, Average Daily Ridership, Light Rail, 2002–2016

Light rail

- Blue Line: Hillsboro – Beaverton – City Center – Gresham
- Green Line: Gateway Transit Center – Clackamas
- Orange Line: Union Station – City Center – Milwaukie
- Red Line: Hillsboro – Beaverton – City Center – Portland International Airport
- Yellow Line: Expo Center – City Center – Portland State University

Commuter rail

- WES: Beaverton – Tigard – Tualatin – Wilsonville

From 1991 until 2014, TriMet also operated the Portland Vintage Trolley service, which ran on a portion of the MAX system on most weekends. It was reduced to only seven dates per year in 2011 and was discontinued entirely in July 2014.

Additionally, the Portland Streetcar system, which is owned and managed by the City of Portland, not TriMet, is operated and maintained by TriMet under contract with the City of Portland. TriMet also provides a portion of the funding for the streetcar lines.

== Bus service ==
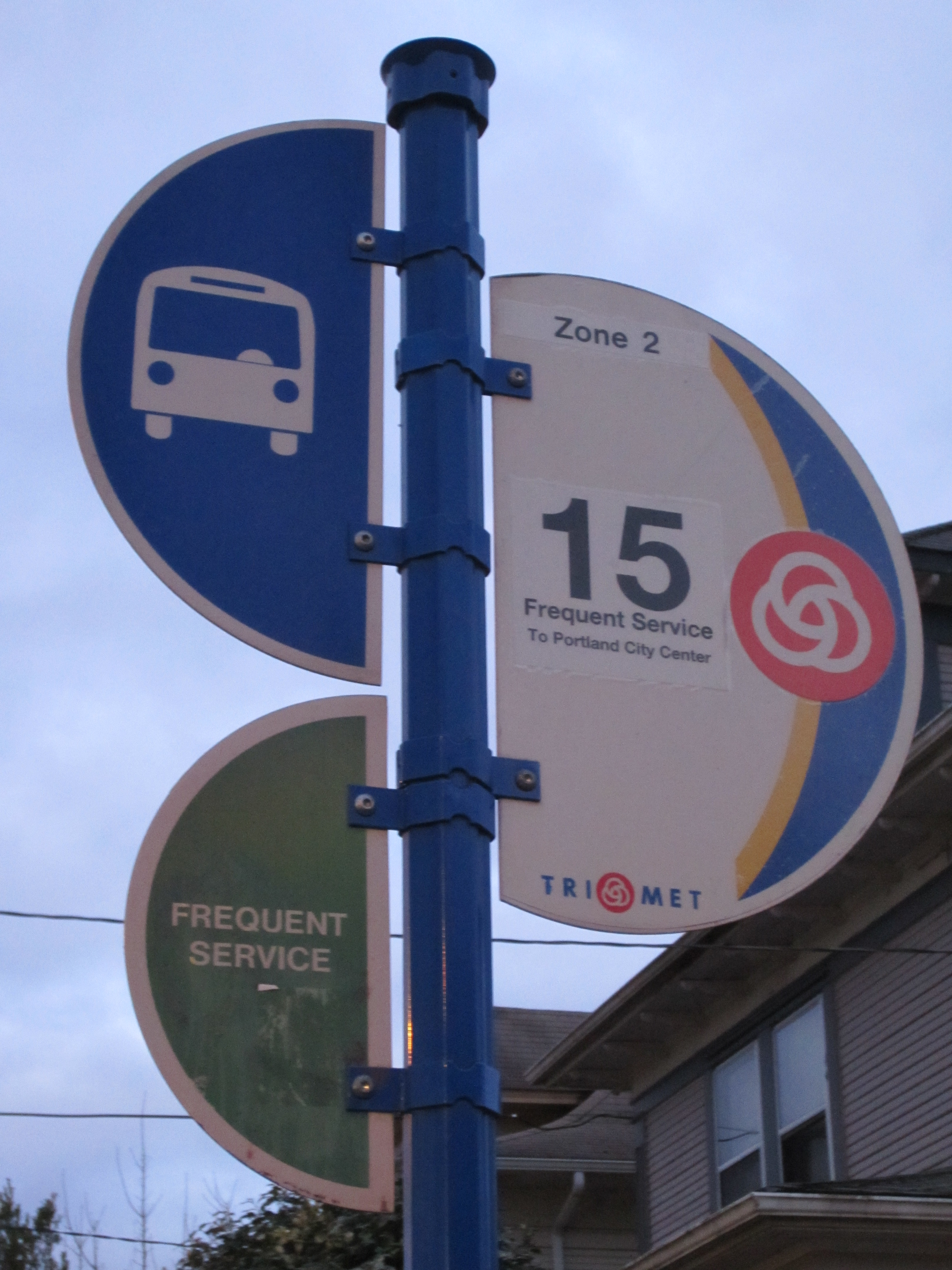
A bus stop sign of the current design (2000-present) with frequent service.

A typical TriMet bus stop shelter

As of May 2026, TriMet operates 79 bus routes (including the FX route, plus five routes that replace the MAX light rail service in late-night hours). Each route is identified by both a number and a name. The numbers are mostly in the range 1–99, but there are currently nine routes with three-digit numbers. From 1969 until 1973, TriMet bus routes were named but not numbered, a practice inherited from Rose City Transit and the "Blue Bus" lines, but route numbers were assigned to all routes in August 1973.

Nineteen bus routes are designated as "Frequent Service Lines", which the agency defines as having a headway of 15 minutes or less most of the service day (service is less frequent in the early morning and late evening). Fifty-eight percent of all bus trips are on the frequent service lines. Bus stops that are served by a frequent service line are identified with an additional green sign.

The bus system includes 15 transit centers, that allow passengers to transfer between bus routes and, at many transit centers, MAX routes.

TriMet buses began carrying bicycles on the front in 1992, on a trial basis on eight routes; the experiment was judged a success and within three years the entire bus fleet had been fitted with bike racks.

TriMet added a temporary free shuttle service connecting between Rose Quarter Transit Center and a temporary bottle redemption facility in industrial district in Northwest Portland specifically to address people redeeming empty containers while grocers have been relieved from the Oregon Bottle Bill during the COVID-19 pandemic. This service was created at the request of Governor Kate Brown and it went into service on April 29, 2020.

On September 18, 2022, TriMet started its FX (Frequent Express) service, a limited-stop bus route with some bus rapid transit features. FX replaced the 2-Division, the sixth busiest bus route in the system, and features articulated buses, all-door boarding, transit signal priority, bus lanes and frequent service (12-minute headways all day).

== Fares ==
TriMet uses a flat fare system, with a single price (for each category of rider: adult, youth, senior or disabled) regardless of the distance of the trip. Single-fare tickets permit unlimited transfers to other routes within 2½ hours, and passes are valid until end of the service day.

Several different methods of fare payment are available. On buses, riders can pay with cash, but no change is given. On the MAX Light Rail system, in common with most other North American light rail systems and on the WES Commuter Rail line, TriMet uses a proof-of-payment fare system, requiring riders not already in possession of a valid fare to purchase or validate one before boarding. Ticket vending machines at MAX and WES stations accept cash and credit and debit cards. For both bus and rail riders, a number of other payment methods are available as an alternative to cash.

TriMet tickets and passes are also valid on the Portland Streetcar, which is owned by the City of Portland but operated mostly by TriMet personnel under a contract with the city.

TriMet also has a mobile ticketing app, allowing riders to purchase and use tickets for buses, light rail, and commuter rail on their smartphones. The app, called TriMet Tickets, was developed by Portland startup GlobeSherpa (now Moovel Transit) and released in September 2013 at no cost to TriMet. Instead, Moovel Transit will take a commission on every ticket sale through the app.

An e-fare system named "Hop Fastpass" was introduced in July 2017. Developed by INIT (Innovations in Transportation) for TriMet, the City of Portland, and C-Tran, at a cost estimated (in 2015) to be about $30 million, the new Hop Fastpass system enables riders to pay with a fare card, using card readers on buses and train platforms and, as of August 2017, using a smartphone equipped with NFC (near field communication) via a digital wallet. The name is said to evoke both the speed of the rabbit and the hop plant used as an ingredient in the craft beer brewed in Portland.

== Fleet ==
=== Buses ===
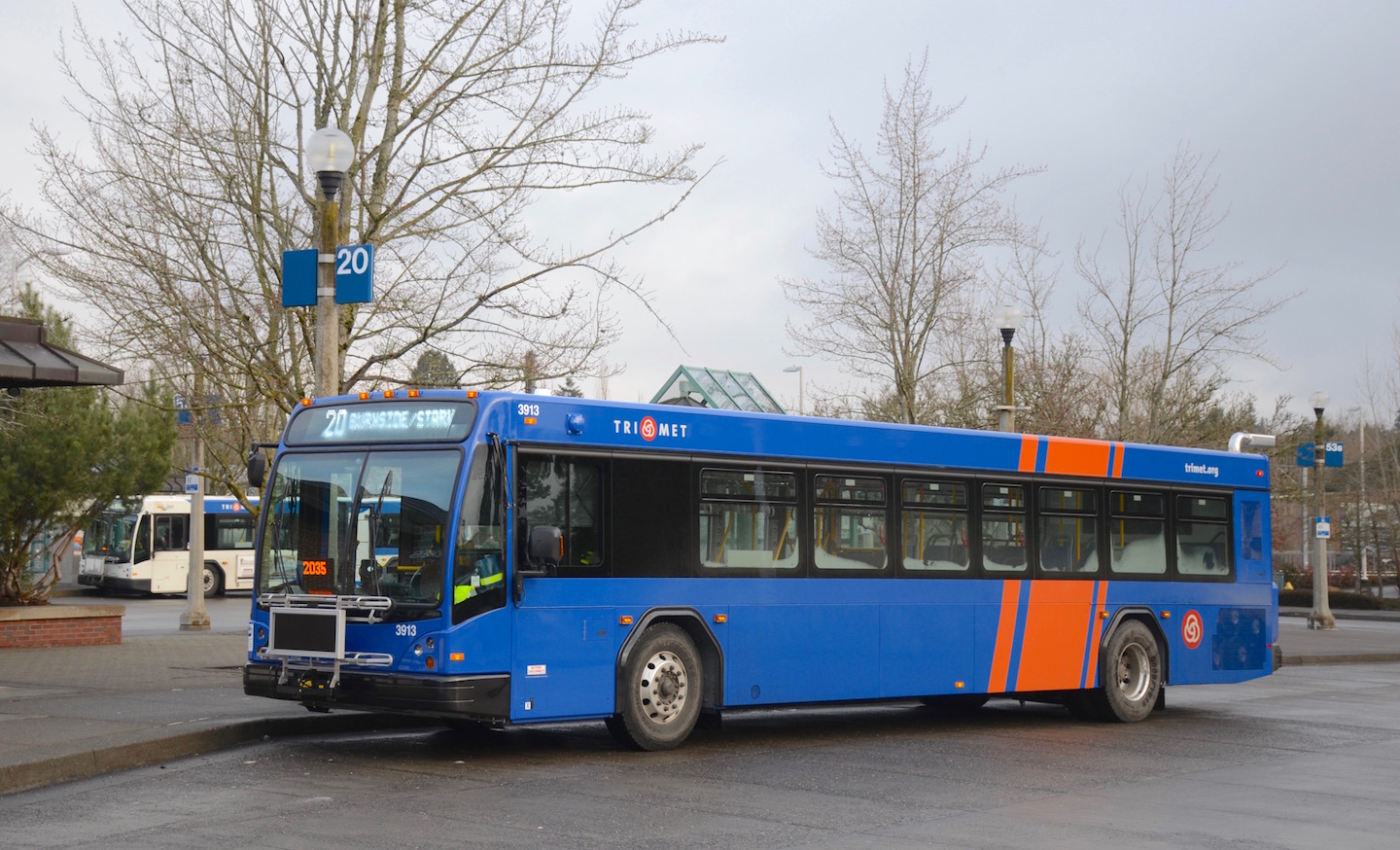
In early 2019, TriMet introduced a new paint scheme, the first such change since 2002. It is seen here on Gillig BRT-model bus 3913.

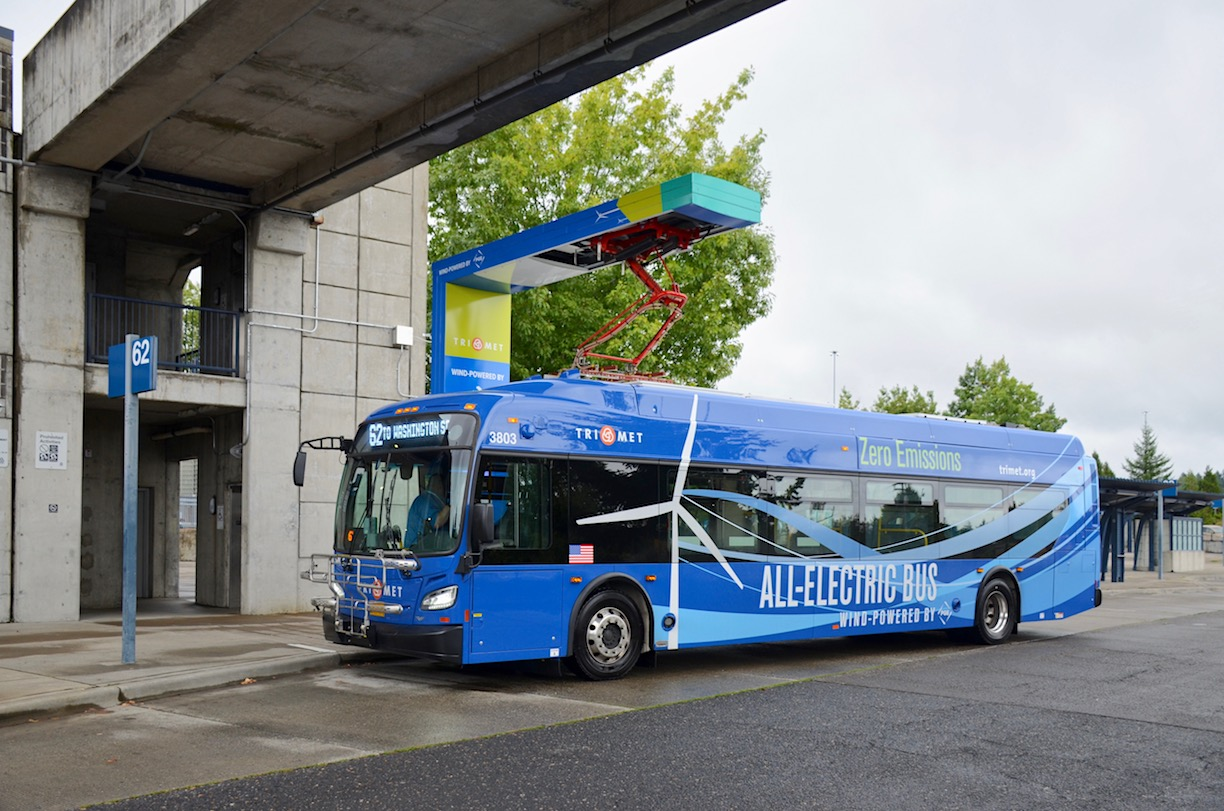
One of TriMet's first battery-electric buses, five New Flyer XE40s that entered service in 2019, using the overhead charger at Sunset Transit Center

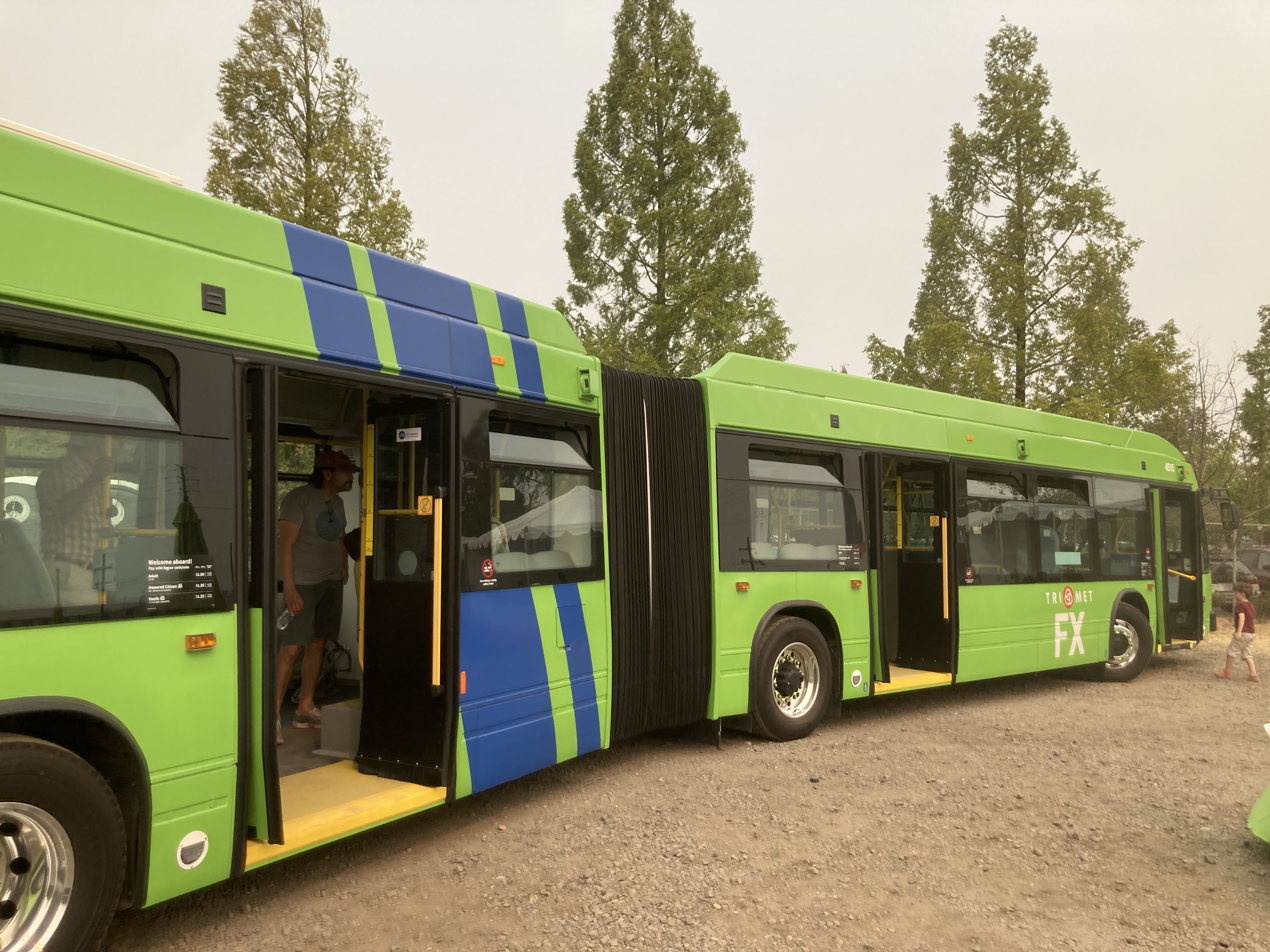
Frequent Express articulated bus

Buses come in lengths of either 40 or 30 feet (12 or 9 meters) for use on traditional fixed-route services. TriMet also owns a fleet of 253 minibuses and 15 vans for use on LIFT Paratransit service. As of fiscal year 2026, TriMet's fleet included 669 buses.

By March 2017, the entire active fleet of regular buses were low-floor models and equipped with air-conditioning. This was the culmination of a plan launched 20 years earlier. In 1997, the TriMet board decided that all buses purchased in the future should be low-floor type and equipped with air-conditioning. The decision was for a gradual phase-out of high-floor, non-air-conditioned buses as they reached the ends of their normal lifespan (about 18–20 years) and in 2013 TriMet was anticipating that by 2017 all buses would have low floors without steps. In the agency's early years, all buses it purchased new had air-conditioning, but TriMet decided to stop using it in the late 1970s and to only buy non-air-conditioned buses, because it did not consider the expense of maintaining the equipment to be justified given the relatively few hot days in Portland (in the 1970s). The agency returned to a policy of having air-conditioning in new buses in 1997. TriMet retired its last non-air-conditioned buses in late December 2015. The last series of high-floor buses in service were taken out of regular use in June 2016, but with some kept serviceable through the summer for use on temporary shuttles used during construction-related disruptions to MAX service that took place between August and September.

While most of TriMet's fleet uses diesel motors for propulsion, the agency has also experimented with hybrid electric buses. The first two hybrid buses entered service in 2002, but in 2008 TriMet stated that the buses had not performed sufficiently better than its newest diesel buses to justify the estimated 50-percent-higher purchase cost, and that consequently the agency had no plans to purchase additional hybrid buses at that time. These first two hybrid buses were retired in 2012. However, with hybrid technology having improved since that earlier purchase, TriMet acquired four new hybrid buses in 2012 and placed them into service in January 2013 on line 72, a long, mostly level north–south route. TriMet acquired four more hybrid buses in 2015 with even greater electronic technology on board.

Since October 30, 2006, all TriMet buses and paratransit minibuses have been fueled by a B5 biodiesel blend. Plans to increase to a B10 or higher mix were later put on hold as a result of cost increases and problems experienced in a trial use of B10 blend in about one-quarter of the fleet.

The agency delayed new bus purchases for four years due to the Great Recession and the resulting decrease in income from taxes. In 2012 TriMet began to replace buses on an accelerated schedule. By that time some of the buses in the fleet were more than 20 years old and had become more expensive to maintain and less reliable. The first order of 55 40-foot Gillig buses began to enter service in fall 2012, followed by 70 buses in 2013, 60 in the summer of 2014, followed by another 30 in October 2014. In early 2015, TriMet received its first new 30-foot buses in more than 20 years. These 22 Gillig buses are similar to the rest of TriMet's new buses, but their shorter length allows them to serve routes with tighter turns and difficult terrain.

By mid-2016 TriMet planned to have 326 buses on the road under four years old, which would allow the agency to meet the industry standard of an average age of eight years. TriMet's 3900-series buses, an order of 64 diesel buses built in 2018 and 2019 and entering service in February 2019, introduced a new paint scheme for the agency, of all-over blue with a trio of semi-upright orange stripes near the rear on each side.

The Frequent Express service operates a fleet of 60-foot (18.3 m) articulated buses; they were manufactured by Nova Bus in Plattsburgh, New York. Each bus can carry up to 115 passengers, 60% more than TriMet's standard 40-foot (12.2 m) bus, and features all-door, right-side boarding via three doors along the front, middle, and rear. Up to two bicycles can be stored inside the bus using roll-in racks located near the rear.

TriMet's buses operate out of three garages:

- Center Street Garage (in inner Southeast Portland); current facilities opened in 1978, replacing former RCT facilities at same site
- Merlo Garage (in Beaverton to the west); opened in 1980 with temporary facilities, and full-service maintenance building opened in 1983
- Powell Garage (located in East Portland); opened in 1977; completely rebuilt 2018–2022 (with main building and most other structures replaced)

TriMet bus fleet
Make	Model	Year built	Length	Fleet numbers	Qty.	Fuel type	Image
Gillig	Low Floor BRT	2012	40'	3052–3055	4	Diesel-electric hybrid	
Gillig	Low Floor BRT	2015	40'	3056–3059	4	Diesel-electric hybrid	
Gillig	Low Floor BRT	2012	40'	3001–3051	51	Biodiesel	
Gillig	Low Floor BRT	2013	40'	3101–3170	70	Biodiesel	
Gillig	Low Floor BRT	2014	40'	3201–3260	60	Biodiesel	
Gillig	Low Floor BRT	2014	40'	3301–3330	30	Biodiesel	
Gillig	Low Floor BRT	2015	40'	3261–3268	8	Biodiesel	
Gillig	Low Floor BRT	2015	40'	3501–3577	77	Biodiesel	
Gillig	Low Floor BRT	2016	40'	3601–3650	50	Biodiesel	
Gillig	Low Floor BRT	2017	40'	3701–3757	57	Biodiesel	
Gillig	Low Floor BRT	2015	30'	3401–3422	22	Biodiesel	
Gillig	Low Floor BRT	2018	40'	3901–3964	64	Biodiesel	
Gillig	Low Floor BRT	2019	40'	4001–4071	71	Biodiesel	
Gillig	Low Floor BRT	2020	40'	4201–4239	39	Biodiesel	
Gillig	Low Floor Plus	2021	40'	4301–4305	5	Battery electric	
Gillig	Low Floor Plus	2024	40'	4401–4424	24	Battery electric	
New Flyer	Xcelsior CHARGE	2018	40'	3801–3805	5	Battery electric	
Nova Bus	LFSA	2022	62'	4501–4531	31	Biodiesel	

=== Light rail (MAX) ===
TriMet's fleet includes 145 light rail vehicles, of 5 general types: TriMet Type 1, Type 2/Type 3 (almost identical), Type 4 and Type 5. The first two cars of Type 5 entered service in April 2015. TriMet placed an order for new cars to replace the Type 1 trains in 2019. The first car arrived in December 2022, to be tested.

Image	Designation	Car numbers	Manufacturer	Model	First used	No. of seats/overall capacity (Note: See notes below regarding vehicle capacities.)	Quantity
A Type 1 car that has been overhauled and repainted into the 2002-adopted paint scheme	Type 1	101–126	Bombardier (Retired 2026)	N/A	1986	76/166	26
MAX train of two Type 2 cars	Type 2	201–252	Siemens	SD660	1997	64/166	52
MAX train crossing Steel Bridge in 2009 – street view of SD660 LRVs	Type 3	301–327	Siemens	SD660	2003	64/166	27
MAX Light Rail Car (Multnomah County, Oregon scenic images) (mulDA0008a)	Type 4	401–422	Siemens	S70	2009	68/172	22
Type 5 LRVs laying over on the Blue Line in Hillsboro, May 2015	Type 5	521–538	Siemens	S700 (Note: TriMet's "Type 5" cars were model S70 when purchased and placed in service, but in 2020 were retroactively rebranded as model S700 by Siemens.)	2015	72/186	18
	Type 6	601–630	Siemens	S700	2025	66/168	30

==== Notes ====
Notes on capacities:

- The capacities given are for a single car; a two-car train has double the capacity.
- The Type 2 cars originally had 72 seats, but eight seats were later removed, to make space for bicycles.
- All of these capacity figures are based on "normal" loading conditions (defined as 4 standing passengers per square meter by industry standards); under so-called "crush" loading conditions (6-8 standees per m^{2}), all of these cars are capable of carrying many more passengers than stated here.

=== Commuter rail (WES) ===
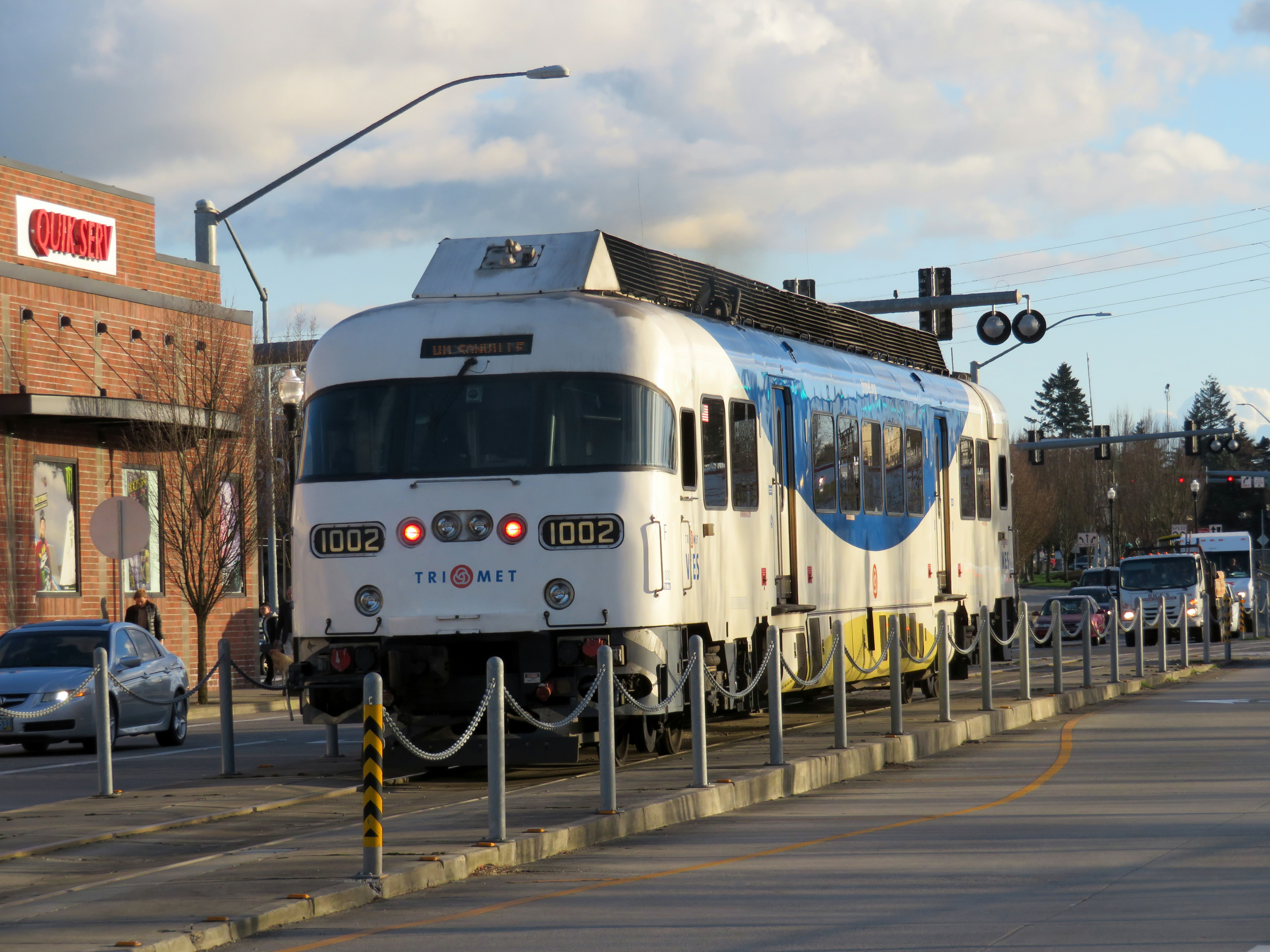
WES Commuter Rail car in central Beaverton

The commuter rail line between Beaverton and Wilsonville is operated primarily with trains made up from a fleet of four Colorado Railcar Aero diesel multiple unit railcars. TriMet also owns four Budd RDC diesel multiple-unit railcars, of which two have entered service and are used as a backup.

== Paint schemes ==
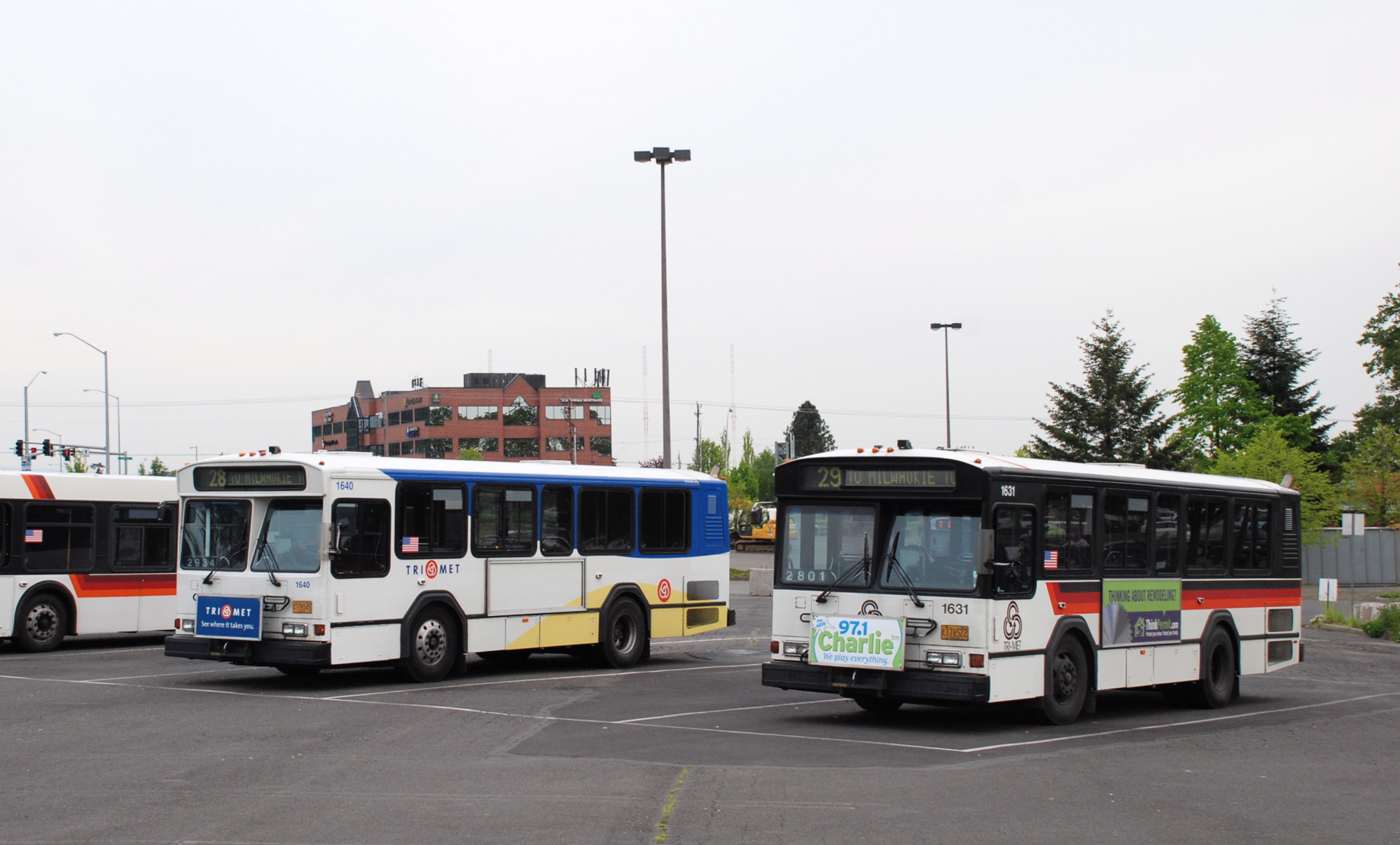
TriMet's pre-2002 (right) and post-2002 paint schemes illustrated on 1991 Gillig Phantom buses (a type of bus now retired in TriMet's fleet)

TriMet has had four main paint schemes during its five-decade history. The agency's first paint scheme, adopted in April 1970, featured a tangerine (or orange) base with silver (unpainted metal) along the middle portion of the lower half and a white stripe below and above the windows. The windshield also had a white outline around it. The white above the windows curved upward to the roof at the first door, leaving the bus's front section all orange at the roof.

TriMet's second paint scheme, which was adopted in August 1980 and was the agency's standard paint scheme from 1980 to 2002 (but remains in use on most of the Type 2 MAX cars in 2021), features a white base with a three-color stripe below the windows. The stripe colors are (in order from top to bottom) burgundy, red and orange, and near the front on each side the stripe makes a sharp bend and angles upward to the roof (except on MAX cars). The logo of TriMet – which at that time was still using the hyphenated spelling Tri-Met – was shown on the front end.

TriMet's third paint scheme, of white with blue and "buttery" yellow, was adopted in August 2002. It features a white base with a large blue semi-circle at the top, curving downward, and a smaller pale yellow semi-circle at the bottom, curving upward. This was the first paint scheme to use the current logo.

TriMet's current standard paint scheme was introduced in early 2019. It is all-over blue with three orange vertical, and slightly angled, lines in the rear portion on each side, with the middle line being thicker than the two outer lines. TriMet's Frequent Express (FX) buses have a similar paint scheme, but with green and blue colors.

There have also been other paint scheme variations. TriMet's 3800-series battery-electric buses use an all-blue paint scheme with several blue stripes and wind turbine graphics to call attention to their being all-electric buses. The WES RDCs use a paint scheme of mostly bare metal with a large white stripe along the windows, and a smaller blue stripe above the white stripe. The front of the train has a blue and yellow stripe pattern.

== Timeline ==
=== 1960s ===
- 1969 Tri-Met takes over for the nearly bankrupt Rose City Transit Company. The system has 175 buses and a daily ridership of about 65,000.

=== 1970s ===
- 1970 Tri-Met takes over the "Blue Bus" companies, the four companies which had been providing bus service to and within Portland's suburbs, adding another 88 buses to the agency's fleet.
- 1973 Route numbers (or Line numbers) are adopted for the first time; previously, routes had been designated only by names.
- 1974 The first shelters at bus stops are installed.
- 1975 The "Fareless Square" is created in downtown Portland, with the goal of reducing short automobile trips within the city core and attracting more riders. Fares outside the Square are 35 cents. The zone-based fare system was discontinued at that time, but was reinstated less than four years later and remained in use until 2012.
- 1977/78 The 22-block Portland Transit Mall opens on downtown's Fifth and Sixth Avenues. The mall includes bus-only lanes and provides a hub to make it easier for riders to make connections. Tri-Met also introduces the seven "sector symbols", for different areas of the transit district, used at stops on the new mall: Brown Beaver (SE), Green Leaf (S), Yellow Rose (SW), Orange Deer (W), Red Fish (N), Purple Raindrops (NE) and Blue Snowflake (E)
- 1978 After 3½ years using a "flat" fare system, a zonal fare structure is reinstated, with three fare zones. Zone 1 consisted of downtown Portland and extending about one to two miles (3 km) out. Zone 2 was a ring around Zone 1 out two to three more miles. Zone 3 wrapped around Zone 2 and consisted of the rest of the system within the suburbs of Portland.

=== 1980s ===
- 1981 24-hour recorded schedule information becomes available over the phone.

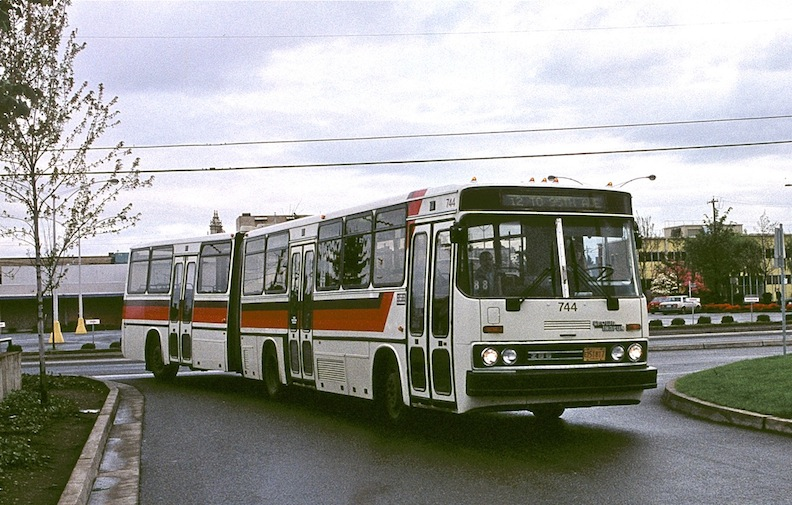
One of TriMet's first series of articulated buses, in service 1982–99.

- 1982 Tri-Met introduces articulated buses for the first time. The buses were manufactured by Crown-Ikarus, a now-defunct partnership between Ikarus, of Hungary, and Crown Coach, of California, but they proved to be sufficiently trouble-plagued that the agency later sues the manufacturer to recover expenses tied to excessive repairs; a settlement was reached in 1987. The last bus was retired in 1999 and TriMet did not purchase articulated buses again until 2019 (for the Division Transit Project, to enter service in 2022).
- 1982 In September, Tri-Met introduces a proof-of-payment (or "self-service") fare system for all service, but discontinues it in June 1984, due to fare evasion, high equipment repair costs and other problems.
- 1983 Completion of the installation of two-way radios on the entire fleet; 100 buses already had radios by 1980, and all others were equipped in 1982–83.
- 1986 As part of a package of budget cuts, Tri-Met discontinues its all-night "Owl" service, making Portland the second largest U.S. city without all-night transit service. Seven regular (daytime) bus routes also were eliminated.
- 1986 The 15-mile (24 km) long MAX Light Rail line between Portland and Gresham opens. It reintroduces rail transit service to the Portland area, missing since the 1950s.
- 1989 Tri-Met is named the best large transit system in North America by the American Public Transit Association.

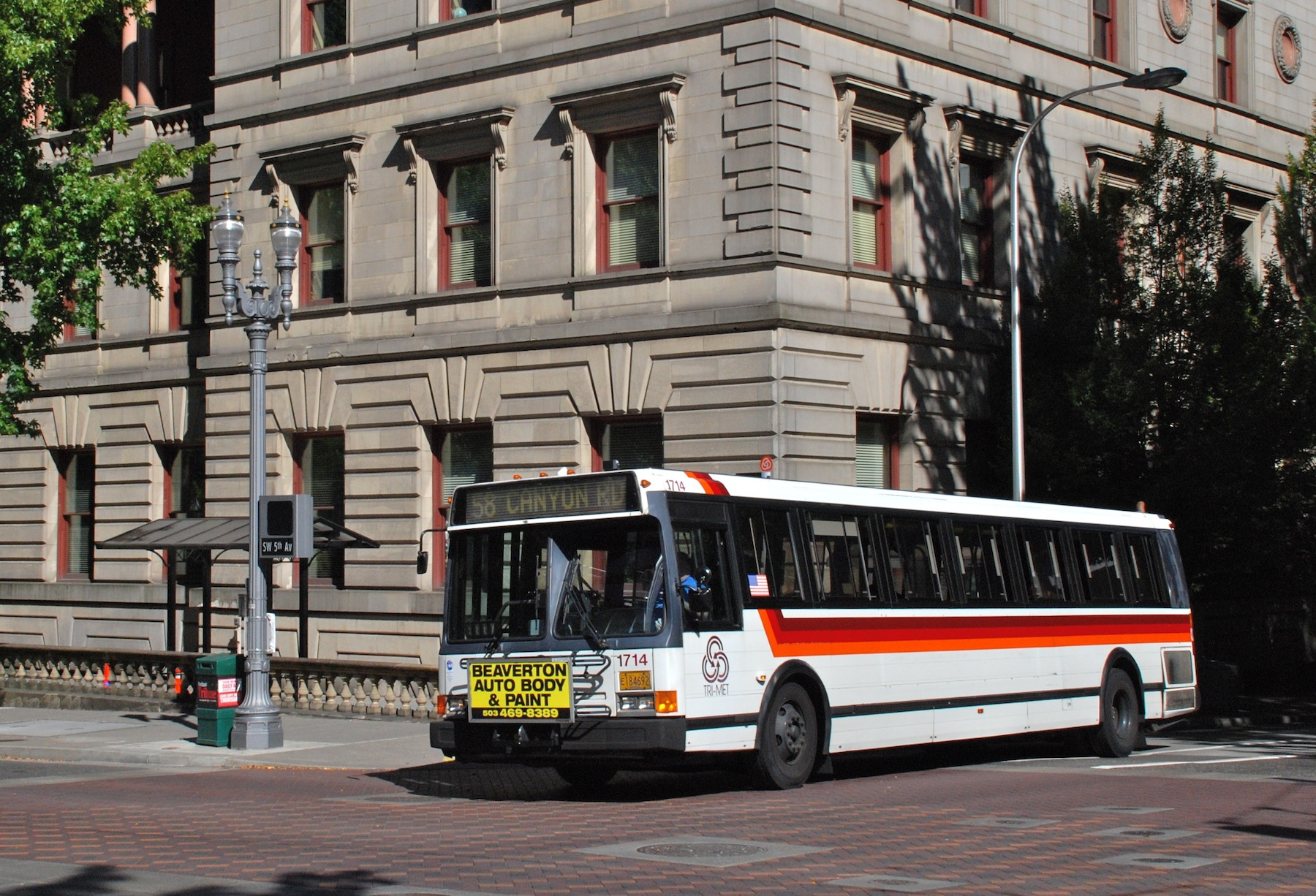
For more than 40 years, until 2015, TriMet's fleet included buses built by Flxible, an example of which is the 1992 Flxible Metro shown in this 2013 photo.

=== 1990s ===
- 1992 The first bike racks are installed on the fronts of some Tri-Met buses, as part of a one-year trial project.
- 1995 Tri-Met's website goes online, hosted by local Internet service provider Teleport (which eventually becomes acquired by OneMain.com, later to become part of Earthlink). At the time when Internet access was less ubiquitous, Tri-Met also offered a dial-up information service through Teleport using a Unix shell and Lynx.
- 1996 Tri-Met begins to equip its bus fleet with vehicle tracking system equipment, to enable monitoring of buses in service, using GPS technology.
- 1997 The first low-floor buses and light-rail cars go into service.
- 1998 Westside MAX (now known as the Blue Line between Portland and Hillsboro) opens. Tri-Met also establishes bus lines that come every 15 minutes or sooner everyday, lessening the need to consult a schedule when using them.
- 1999 Satellite-assisted bus arrival time displays (later to be named Transit Tracker) are installed at select major bus stops in North Portland and downtown.

=== 2000s ===
- 2001 Fareless Square is expanded to a small portion of Northeast Portland between Lloyd Center and the Steel Bridge. Airport MAX (the Red Line) begins service on September 10 after a public/private partnership, prompted by a proposal from Bechtel Corporation, enables its construction years ahead of TriMet's plans for the use of public funds. Bechtel received exclusive development rights to 120 acres (486,000 m^{2}) near the entrance to Portland International Airport. The original MAX line began to be referred to as the MAX Blue Line upon the opening of the Red Line. Bus sector symbols began to be phased out from maps and publications.
- 2002 With the September schedule change, Tri-Met launches a new corporate identity strategy. It is renamed TriMet (without a hyphen) and a new logo and blue, white and yellow livery are introduced. An improved automated phone service is introduced.
- 2004 Interstate MAX (the Yellow Line) opens along Interstate Avenue. The fleet has grown to 638 buses, 208 paratransit vehicles, and 105 trains with a daily ridership of over 300,000.
- 2005 TriMet introduces biodiesel fuel into its fleet, using a B5 blend (5 percent pure biodiesel, 95 percent petroleum diesel), initially on LIFT (paratransit) minibuses only. Use of B5 biodiesel was expanded to the entire bus fleet in late 2006.
- 2007 The Portland Mall, on 5th and 6th Avenues, is shut down for rebuilding and southward extension (to PSU), including adding a second light-rail alignment through downtown. The rebuilding, to take over 2 years, is part of the MAX Green Line project, but will also replace all infrastructure for buses on the already 29-year-old transit mall. Most bus routes serving downtown are detoured to other streets until 2009.
- 2009 The 14.7-mile (23.7 km) WES Commuter Rail opens on February 2. WES (Westside Express Service) provides service between Beaverton and Wilsonville with stations in Tigard and Tualatin in between.
- 2009 In May, the Portland Mall reopens for buses, and testing and training runs for the new Mall MAX tracks begin, for opening August 30.
- 2009 Due to the Great Recession's effect on the agency's finances, the board approves a series of service reductions, to take effect in September. The board votes on August 12 to discontinue Fareless Square for bus service beginning in January 2010, while retaining fare-free rides in the downtown area on MAX and the Portland Streetcar.
- 2009 On August 30, MAX service on the transit mall is introduced, with the shifting of the Yellow Line to the new alignment. September 12 brings the opening of the Green Line, also using the new transit-mall tracks, running from downtown (PSU) to Clackamas Town Center. It is TriMet's first light rail line serving Clackamas County.

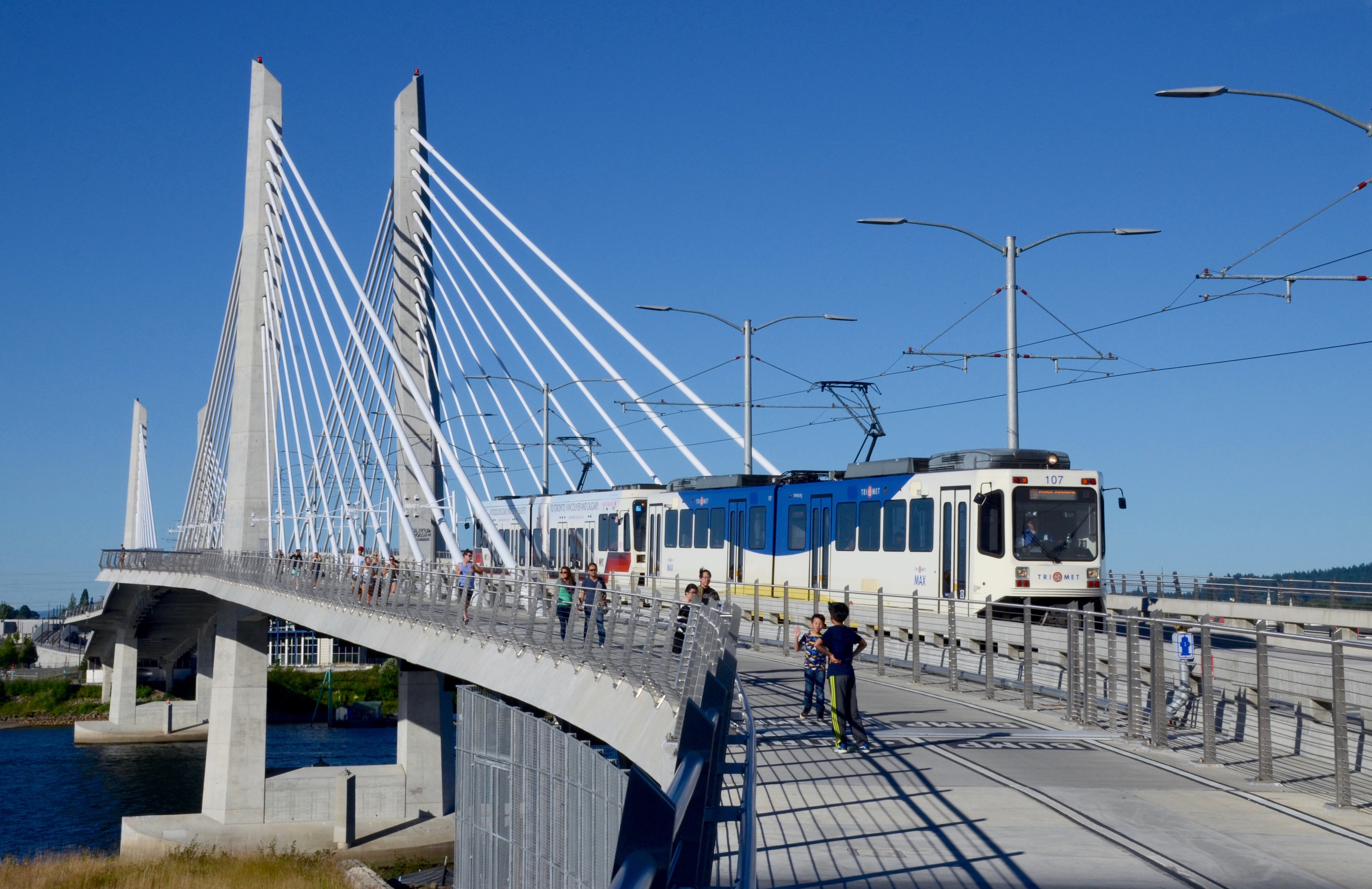
TriMet's Tilikum Crossing, built as part of the MAX Orange Line project, opened in 2015.

=== 2010s ===
- 2012 TriMet purchases 55 new Gillig diesel buses to begin replacing buses dating back to 1990. The last four of the new buses are hybrid-electrics estimated to be 20-50% more fuel-efficient and produce 95% fewer emissions; they replaced hybrid buses that were in service since 2002.
- 2012 TriMet discontinues "Free Rail Zone" (formerly known as the "Fareless Square") in Downtown Portland and ends use of three-zone, distance-based fare system. Until this time, the TriMet district was divided into three fare zones, with fares based on the number of zones in which a passenger traveled.
- 2015 TriMet opens the new MAX Orange Line from Downtown Portland to Milwaukie, and the Tilikum Crossing, used by the Orange Line and two bus lines
- 2018 After 32 years without any all-night transit service, TriMet extends service hours on lines 20-Burnside/Stark and 57-TV Highway to run 24 hours a day. The agency also establishes Line 272-PDX Night Bus to provide early-morning service between NE 82nd Avenue and the Portland International Airport. (This service was discontinued April 5, 2020 due to the COVID-19 pandemic and has not returned.)
- 2019 TriMet introduces a new paint scheme, the first such change since 2002.
- 2019 TriMet's first battery-electric buses, numbered 3801–3805, go into service.

=== 2020s ===
- 2022 on September 18, TriMet's 14-mile Frequent Express line opens. 31 60-foot Novabus LFSA buses are put into service for use on the line.
- 2024 on August 25, TriMet completed the A Better Red project.

== Future ==
TriMet works with local jurisdictions and agencies to identify and recommend priority transit projects to include in Metro's Regional Transportation Plan (RTP). The 2018 RTP is Metro's latest iteration, and it lists three funding scenarios that divide the region's proposals into three priority levels. The highest priority projects, which are referred to as "2027 Constrained", are proposals the region expects to have funding for by 2027. The "2040 Constrained" lists projects that fit within the region's planned budget through 2040, while the "2040 Strategic" are projects that may be built if additional funding becomes available. TriMet also has a page on their website discussing the future plans for their rail and bus lines.

=== Current projects ===
List of projects
Project	Transportation Mode	Status	Description	New stations	Length		Planned opening	Projected Cost
Project	Transportation Mode	Status	Description	New stations	(mi)	(km)	Planned opening	Projected Cost
Southwest Corridor	MAX	Suspended	Extends MAX southwest from PSU in downtown Portland to Bridgeport Village in Tualatin via Southwest Portland and Tigard. It would be served by the Green Line. Voters rejected Measure 26-218, a tax ballot measure that would have funded the local-area share of the project, on November 3, 2020.	13	11	18	2027	$2.6-2.8 billion
Downtown Tunnel	MAX	Proposed	Constructs a tunnel beneath downtown Portland from Goose Hollow to the Lloyd Center.	—	—	—	—	$3–4.5 billion
Forward Together	Bus	In-Progress	To best meet the needs of people in TriMet’s service district, the Revised Service Concept would bring bus service to 50,000 more people, weekend service to 100,000 more and significant increases to frequent buses service to connect people and jobs. Additionally, it would discontinue some lines due to low ridership.	—	—	—	—	—

=== Other proposals ===
TriMet has indicated that other extensions and improvements have been studied or discussed with Metro and cities in the region. These proposals include the following, with light rail and alternatives being considered:

- Extension to Forest Grove via Cornelius and Tualatin Valley Highway (OR 8)
- Extension to Oregon City via McLoughlin Boulevard (OR 99E)
- Extension to Bridgeport Village via I-205
- Extension to Hillsboro via Sunset Highway (US 26)
- Extension to Vancouver, Washington

== Communities served ==
The following cities and unincorporated communities (*) are in the TriMet service area:

- Aloha*
- Beaverton
- Bethany*
- Cedar Hills*
- Cedar Mill*
- Clackamas*
- Cornelius
- Durham
- Estacada
- Forest Grove
- Fairview
- Gladstone
- Gresham
- Hillsboro
- Happy Valley
- Johnson City
- King City
- Lake Oswego
- Milwaukie
- Maywood Park
- Oak Grove*
- Oregon City
- Portland
- Rivergrove
- Sherwood
- Tigard
- Troutdale
- Tualatin
- West Linn
- Wood Village

TriMet buses and commuter rail also serve Wilsonville, Oregon, which is outside the TriMet district, in order to provide connections to transit services operated by SMART in that city.

A state law that went into effect on October 1, 1987, enabled communities with a population of less than 10,000 to petition to leave the TriMet district. A petition, which needed to be signed by at least 15 percent of registered voters in the affected area, must demonstrate that a community is not receiving adequate service and that TriMet's payroll tax is adversely affecting business activity for the withdrawal from the transit district to be approved. The first three areas to make use of the law and withdraw from the TriMet district, effective January 1, 1989, were Damascus, Molalla, and Wilsonville. The Boring area was removed from the TriMet District on January 1, 2013.

== Safety ==
TriMet employs a transit police division to patrol its services. Officers in this division normally serve with local law enforcement agencies and are assigned terms with the transit police; this partnership with local police enables the closest available unit to respond to incidents. TriMet also partners with the Transportation Security Administration, which provides a canine unit to detect explosives and deter acts of terrorism. Riders are encouraged to alert TriMet employees using on-board intercoms or to dial 9-1-1 when witnessing crime or suspicious activity. TriMet operates over 4,000 security cameras. All TriMet vehicles became fully equipped with cameras in 2014.

In the aftermath of the 2020 George Floyd protests, TriMet reallocated $1.8 million in police contracts and established a transit public safety committee to reevaluate safety and security. In June 2020, an audit by Portland's Independent Police Review concluded that accountability for the transit police, which the Portland Police Bureau (PPB) oversaw, "fell short of the community's expectations". According to the audit, PPB's management "led to some adverse outcomes with community members when they have a negative encounter with a transit officer and learn that accountability is elusive." The following March, TriMet reassigned control of the transit police to the Multnomah County Sheriff's Office. In fall 2021, TriMet deployed a Safety Response Team on MAX. The 24-member team is unarmed and aims to "connect riders in need with social services, reduce 911 calls for non-emergencies, and provide emergency supplies to those who need them."

In August 2023, TriMet driver crashed a bus into a tree causing traumatic injuries to himself and one passenger and minor injuries to four passengers.

In November 2023, a MAX train collided with a Portland Streetcar in the Lloyd District and injured two people on board. Investigation concluded the MAX operator was at fault for the crash. The MAX operator was required to go through retraining following the crash, and was subsequently fired in July 2024 for continuing to violate safety protocols.

== Criticism and controversies ==
=== Operator fatigue ===
An investigation by The Oregonian in 2013 led to the revelation that some TriMet drivers were working as many as 22 hours in a 24-hour period. There have also been 22 reported cases of drivers falling asleep at the wheel. In response, the agency adopted a new policy restricting the number of hours a driver is permitted to work within a 24-hour period.

=== Failure rate of MAX ticket vending machines ===
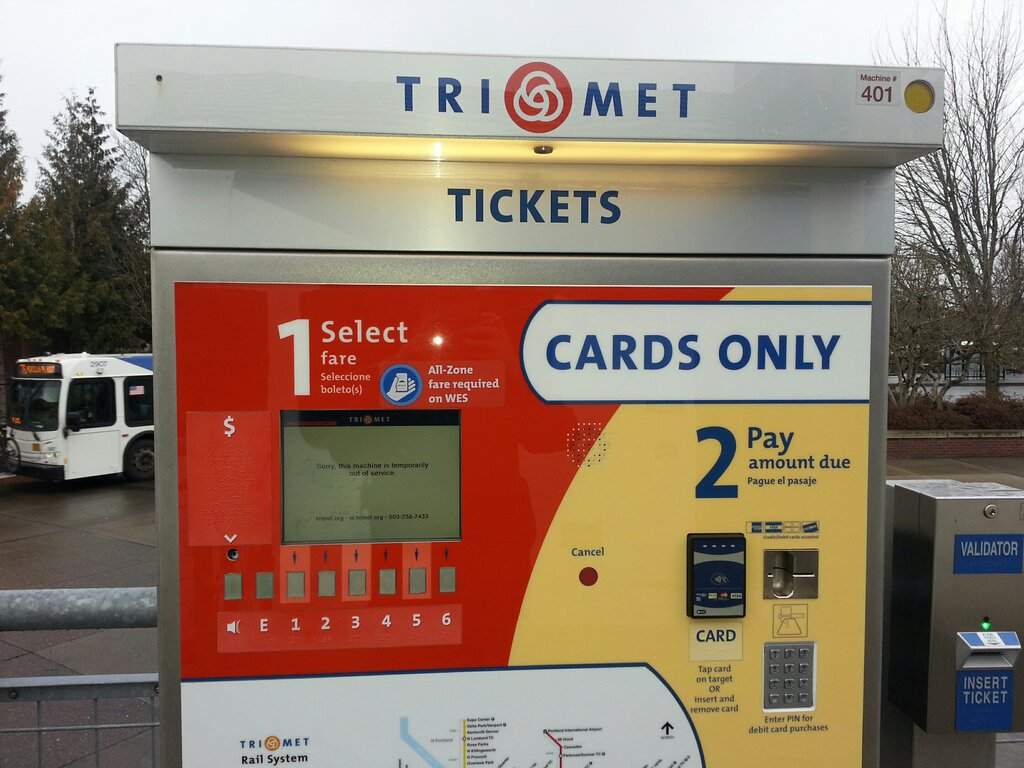
A broken TriMet ticket machine at the Beaverton Transit Center WES platform, old design

An investigation by several local Portland news outlets found that several of the MAX Light Rail ticket machines have extremely high failure rates. Many riders have claimed that they have received a fare evasion citation after boarding the MAX train without a fare after they have attempted to pay for a ticket. The official statement from TriMet is to ride to the next MAX station, de-board the train, pay for a ticket there, and wait for the next train. That response has been deemed unacceptable both by riders and bus/rail operators. TriMet has begun replacing all of its older machines with newer machines and cites a 50% drop in complaints.
