= Blue Bus lines =

- Defunct: 1970
- Locale: Portland, Oregon, U.S.
- Service area: Suburbs of Portland
- Service type: bus transit

The Blue Bus lines were a group of four affiliated privately owned companies that provided bus transit service in the Portland, Oregon metropolitan area in the 1950s and 1960s. The name was unofficial – no company using this or similar name existed in the Portland area – but was in common use in the 1960s, and variations included "Blue Bus lines", "Blue Lines", "blue bus" lines (or companies) and "blue buses". The Blue Bus companies provided service only between Portland and suburbs outside the city, or within such suburbs, as transit service within the city of Portland was the exclusive franchise of the Portland Traction Company or, after 1956, the Rose City Transit Company (RCT). The "blue buses" were prohibited from making stops inside the city except to pick up passengers destined for points outside RCT's service area (or to drop off such passengers when inbound to Portland). The "blue" name was a reference to the paint scheme worn by most buses of the consortium. By contrast, city transit operator Rose City's buses wore a primarily red paint scheme.

All public transit operations of the Blue Bus lines were taken over by Tri-Met, a new regional public transit authority, in 1970, nine months after Tri-Met took over the Rose City Transit Company's service.

== Companies ==
Four companies comprised the Blue Bus consortium of common carriers: Estacada-Molalla Stages, Inc.; Intercity Buses, Inc.; Portland Stages, Inc.; and Tualatin Valley Buses, Inc. The start-up dates for the individual companies ranged from 1938 to 1955. All were owned and operated by George Fourier and his brother-in-law, E. G. Larson. Combined, they served parts of four different counties. Two served areas in Multnomah County, two served Clackamas County, and one served Washington County and parts of Multnomah and Yamhill counties.

=== Portland Stages ===
The first of the four companies that would later come to be known collectively as the "blue bus lines" was Portland Stages, Inc., which first received permission from the Oregon Public Utilities Commission (PUC) to carry passengers on May 24, 1938. The company's main service area was the Multnomah County suburbs east of Portland, including Gresham, Troutdale, and Sandy, with routes between them and a main route connecting Gresham to Portland. Its buses were operated out of a garage in Gresham. In the post-World War II years, the company also introduced bus service to suburbs west and southwest of Portland, in Washington County, with a division or subsidiary named Tualatin Valley Stages, Inc. (sometimes referred to as Tualatin Stages). It was reorganized as a separate company, Tualatin Valley Busses (see below), in 1953.

=== Estacada-Molalla Stages ===
This company began operation on October 29, 1941. Its service was more interurban than suburban, as there were long stretches of rural areas in the middle of its routes, which connected Portland with Estacada and Molalla, via Oregon City and Milwaukie/Lake Road (old OR224). Its small garage was in Estacada. By at least 1966, service to Molalla had been discontinued, but the company did not revise its name.

=== Tualatin Valley Buses ===
Tualatin Valley Buses, Inc. (which originally used the spelling "Busses" in its name) was formed in 1953, but it had effectively already been operating since the 1930s, as a division or subsidiary of Portland Stages, under the name Tualatin Valley Stages (see earlier section).

In 1953, its routes served Beaverton, Cedar Mill, Garden Home, Tigard and Tualatin, among other places. By the end of the decade its service reached Hillsboro and Forest Grove, and also extended as far as McMinnville, in Yamhill County. Service to McMinnville and Forest Grove was introduced when Greyhound received PUC permission to abandon its (intercity-type) service on those routes, in 1959.

Tualatin Valley Stages/Buses also provided school bus service under contract with school districts in Washington County, as did Portland Stages for some schools in suburban parts of Multnomah County.

=== Intercity Buses ===
The fourth company, Intercity Buses, Inc. (alternatively written as Inter-City Buses), was formed in late 1954 and began providing its service in 1955. Its routes connected downtown Portland with suburbs located to the south, in Clackamas County, including to Oregon City via Oswego (now Lake Oswego) and West Linn, and to Oregon City via Milwaukie and Gladstone. Service also extended west from Oswego to Lake Grove. Intercity's service on both sides of the Willamette River followed the same routes as had been operated by Oregon Motor Stages, Inc., until that company ceased all operation, in September 1954, following a drivers' strike and financial problems. Those areas were without any public transportation until Intercity Buses inaugurated its service in February 1955.

After adding a new route along River Road in April 1959, Intercity had four Portland–Oregon City routes, following four different roads: Highway 43, River Road, McLoughlin Blvd., and Oatfield Road. Service west of Oswego (renamed Lake Oswego in 1960) included the "North Shore" and "South Shore" routes, connecting neighborhoods on both sides of Oswego Lake with downtown Oswego and continuing through to downtown Portland, as with the company's four Oregon City routes.

== General information and history ==
Unlike Rose City Transit, the "Blue Bus" companies did not have a franchise agreement with the city of Portland, because their service came under the authority of the state Public Utilities Commission. The companies were required to obtain the PUC's permission for any fare increases on routes primarily serving areas more than 3 miles (5 km) outside the Portland city limits. The employees of the four Blue Blue companies shared a common union, Local 1055 of the Amalgamated Transit Union's "Motor Coach Employees Division", and negotiations over labor contracts were undertaken jointly for all four companies. In addition to passengers, the Blue Bus companies carried freight, under a PUC-issued permit, but only on certain routes, and only some of their buses were equipped to accommodate goods.

In 1964–1965, the Blue Bus lines negotiated with Rose City Transit Company on their possible acquisition by RCT, but the two parties were far apart on a price, and never reached an agreement. In 1965, the Blue Bus consortium argued against a request by RCT for city council permission to extend certain of its routes into areas southwest of Portland that were outside the city limits, in areas served by Tualatin Valley Buses. However, the city council approved the extensions, which among other places included service in the Hillsdale, Vermont Hills, Maplewood and Multnomah districts and to Lewis & Clark College. The following year, after the city council approved another expansion of RCT service into areas then served only by "blue bus" routes – this time including extension east of the city, to Hazelwood and adjacent suburbs, as well as additional extensions in the southwest – the consortium said it would file a lawsuit against RCT and the city, to try to stop the expansion. The case was heard in Multnomah County circuit court in December 1966, and in January the court ruled in favor of the city and RCT.

=== Final years ===
In its last years, the consortium's financial situation shifted sharply. As happened with Portland's Rose City Transit and transit systems in many other U.S. cities, the 1960s were a time in which the Blue Bus lines experienced declining patronage, as private car usage greatly expanded, while labor costs were rising. Their shrinking profits made it all the more difficult for them to afford to add service to newly developed suburban neighborhoods. Net annual operating revenue (excluding revenue from carriage of goods) of $47,000 in 1964 turned into a net loss of $118,000 in 1969. Some elected officials said that a public takeover of Portland-area transit was inevitable, in order to ensure that an acceptable level of service would be maintained.

Following a period of intense disagreement between Rose City Transit and the Portland city council, and the threat of a strike and possible suspension of all service, the council took action in late 1969 which facilitated the takeover of the RCT system by Tri-Met on December 1 of that year.

=== Takeover by Tri-Met ===
Soon after the takeover of RCT, negotiations for Tri-Met to take over the Blue Bus lines began. The pace of negotiations was very slow, frustrating the Blue Bus owners, who, starting in January 1970, had been obliged to begin paying Tri-Met's 0.5% employer-payroll tax established to help finance creation of the new regional transit district. The drivers' union was also frustrated and called for a strike on July 1 if the process did not move more quickly, but later pushed back its strike deadline. The Blue Bus companies' owners wanted to sell to Tri-Met, but the two sides were far apart on price, the same situation as had existed during negotiations preceding the RCT takeover. In early August, both sides agreed to proceed with a takeover condemnation, under which process the final value for compensation to the sellers would be determined later by a court. Another delay followed, as Tri-Met waited for approval from the U.S. Department of Transportation, a "Letter of No Prejudice" assuring the agency that a takeover in this manner would not make Tri-Met ineligible for federal grants it was counting on, to help fund the acquisition; this delay again brought a strike very near. Federal approval was received on September 1, and later the same day Tri-Met announced that the takeover would proceed the following Sunday, September 6, 1970. Following a two-day period without service, to allow for relocating vehicles to Tri-Met's garage (and with most Blue Bus routes having had no service on Sundays and holidays, anyway), the first day of Tri-Met operation of the former Blue Bus service was the day after Labor Day, September 8, 1970.

At the time of the takeover by Tri-Met, average daily ridership on all Blue Bus service was only about 8,000. About 100 drivers and maintenance personnel were transferred to Tri-Met, along with 23 routes and 85 buses. With most of the Blue Lines' buses deemed by Tri-Met to be in very poor condition, the agency was already making plans to purchase 75 new buses as soon as possible.

== See also ==
- Transportation in Portland, Oregon
- Tualatin Valley
