= Rose City Transit =

Defunct mass transportation company in Portland, Oregon, United States

Rose City Transit Company
- Parent: Portland Traction Company
- Founded: 1956
- Defunct: 1969
- Locale: Portland, Oregon, United States
- Service area: city of Portland; not suburbs
- Service type: bus transit
- Routes: about 20–30
- Fleet: about 200–230 buses
- Annual ridership: 1957: 29.1 million; 1968: 15.7 million

The Rose City Transit Company (RCT, or RCTC) was a private company that operated most mass transit service in the city of Portland, Oregon, from 1956 to 1969. It operated only within the city proper. Transit services connecting downtown Portland with suburbs outside the city but within the Portland metropolitan area were run by other private companies, mainly a consortium of four companies known collectively as the "Blue Bus" lines.

Rose City Transit was a wholly owned subsidiary of the Portland Traction Company (PTC), which was also its predecessor. Prior to the formation of RCT, most transit service in the city had been provided directly by Portland Traction under that name since the 1930s. After PTC's bus routes were transferred to Rose City Transit in 1956, PTC continued to run two interurban trolley lines (to Oregon City and Bellrose) under its own name, but those two lines – the only trolley car lines remaining in operation in Portland after abandonment of the last city streetcar lines in 1950 – were the only transit routes still operated directly by PTC, which otherwise was a freight railroad. Although RCT was a private company, it operated under a franchise agreement with the city of Portland, through which the city had some oversight control. Any fare increases or major service changes had to be approved by the city council.

Many transit systems in the United States were changing from private to public control in the 1950s, as growth in private-car ownership and other factors made operating mass transit service increasingly unprofitable. By 1962, all but two major West Coast cities had made the change and begun subsidizing transit, and one of those two exceptions was Portland, served by the Rose City Transit Company (with San Diego being the other). By 1967, RCT was the last remaining privately owned big-city transit system on the West Coast, after San Diego Transit became municipalized. Rose City Transit's annual ridership declined from 32.3 million in 1956 to 15.7 million in 1968.

Effective December 1, 1969, a newly formed public authority, Tri-Met, replaced Rose City Transit, taking over all operation and facilities, and using the same personnel, under an agreement reached between RCT, the city council and Tri-Met.

== Formation ==
The Portland Traction Company's 20-year franchise to operate the city's transit system, approved by city voters in 1936, expired on February 10, 1956. In October 1955, the city council refused to renew the franchise, citing dissatisfaction with the company's practices, quality of service and out-of-state corporate control. Since 1946, PTC had been owned by a San Francisco-based holding company called Portland Transit Company, which in turn was controlled by a company called Pacific Associates. In January 1956, PTC owner Portland Transit formed a new subsidiary, Rose City Transit Company, which it hoped would gain city council approval to take over all Portland city transit lines. The only lines serving areas outside the city, the two interurban rail lines to Oregon City and Bellrose (also spelled Bell Rose), would remain with PTC. The council approved this arrangement on a trial basis, and Rose City Transit began operating the city's transit system on February 10, 1956. It used the same vehicles, employees and maintenance facilities previously used by PTC, which technically was its owner, making the transition relatively simple. The new company was initially given only a 60-day revocable franchise by the city, which was later extended by 30 days, while details of a long-term agreement were still being worked out. Both sides wanted changes before agreeing on a long-term franchise; for its part, RCT wanted more freedom to make changes without being required to obtain council approval. At one point when differences between the city council and RCT were great, one city commissioner (council member) proposed putting the idea of municipal ownership of the transit system to a vote by the public if an agreement could not be reached. However, differences were eventually worked out, and RCT was given a two-year franchise, and later a 10-year one, the latter taking effect on January 1, 1963.

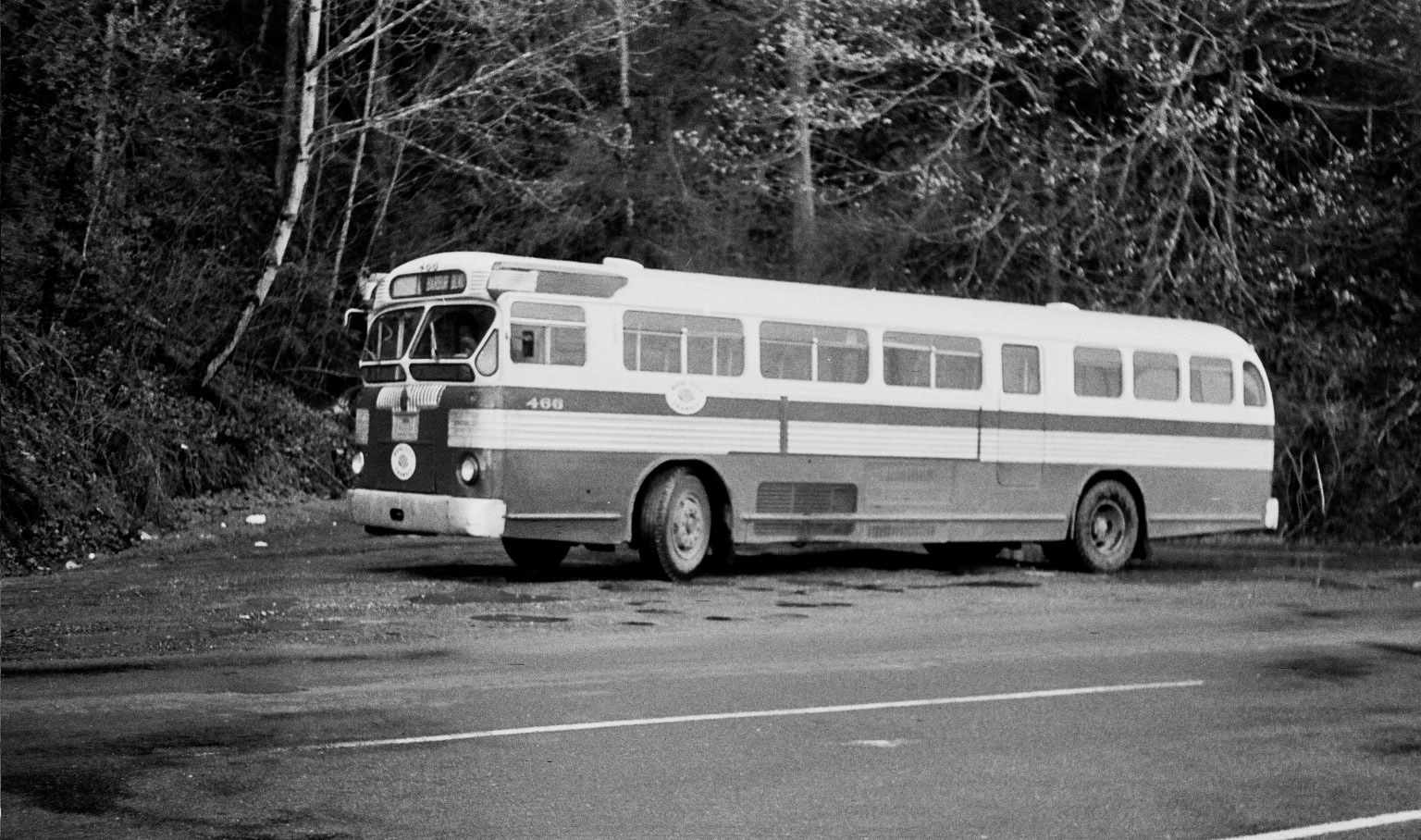
A 1948 Twin Coach bus of Rose City Transit laying over in Linnton in 1963

Portland Transit, the California holding company, created a separate subsidiary named Landport Company, Inc., to own RCT's vehicles, facilities and properties. Landport leased them to RCT. RCT's first president was Gordon Steele, who had been president of PTC for many years prior; he retired in August 1956.

Local bus service outside the Portland city limits was operated by other private companies, including Portland Stages, Inc.; Tualatin Valley Stages, Inc.; Intercity Buses, Inc. and Estacada-Molalla Stages. These four were collectively – but unofficially – known as the "‘Blue Bus’ lines" or "Blue Buses". In 1964, RCT began negotiating to purchase the four suburban companies, but no deal was reached, and the four Blue Bus lines remained in operation until taken over by Tri-Met in 1970. Bus service between Portland and Vancouver, Washington, was provided only by the Vancouver-Portland Bus Company, a private company that remained in operation until the end of 1976.

== Service overview ==
Logo used on Rose City Transit buses (shown here in black-and-white)

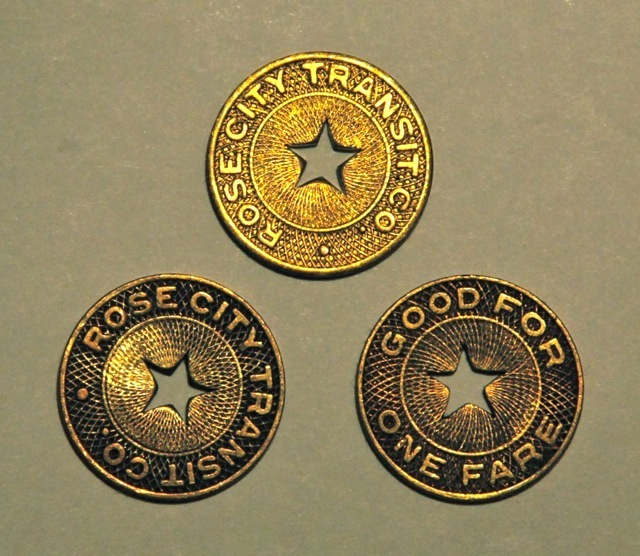
Rose City Transit fare tokens

At the time of the transfer from Portland Traction Company to Rose City Transit, the transit system included about 30 routes, using a fleet of about 230 buses (including trolley buses). The adult fare (since early 1955) was 20 cents, with tokens priced three for 50 cents, increasing in February 1958 to 25 cents with tokens two for 45 cents. By mid-1966, the basic fare was 35 cents, which was the highest of any transit system on the Pacific Coast.

In a series of changes implemented between October 1958 and April 1959, nearly all routes terminating downtown were connected into through-route combinations – for example, the "Broadway" line was linked to the "Powell" line (a combination which lasted until 2012) – to make operation through downtown more efficient. After these changes, the revised total number of routes in Rose City's system was 21. Routes were designated only by names, not numbers, during RCT's entire existence. Not until 1973, more than three years after Tri-Met took over, were Portland-area transit routes first designated by numbers. As of 1961, about 180 buses were in scheduled service during rush hour.

== Workforce ==
Rose City's drivers and most other workers were unionized, as they had been under PTC, represented by local 757 of the Amalgamated Association of Street, Electric Railway and Motor Coach Employes of America (later renamed the Amalgamated Transit Union). In 1960, 227 of the unionized employees were drivers. RCT never experienced a strike by its drivers, but an impasse between the company and the union during contract negotiations in 1968 led to a three-day suspension of all service, the first suspension of transit service in the city's history. In mid-1968, the company had 350 drivers and 133 other employees.

== Electric transit ==
Rose City Transit never operated any streetcar service, but its parent, the Portland Traction Company, continued to operate streetcars on its two interurban lines, from Portland to Bellrose (at SE 136th Avenue north of Foster Road, on what is now the Springwater Corridor trail) and Oregon City after the urban transit lines were transferred from PTC to RCT. These operated until January 25, 1958, but service was then abruptly abandoned and PTC retained only its freight service. The last three city streetcar lines had closed on February 26, 1950, six years before the city transit system was transferred to Rose City.

=== Trolley bus service ===
RCT did operate electric trolley bus service, albeit for less than three years. The city's first trolley bus line was opened by Portland Traction on August 30, 1936, and by 1937 Portland had one of the largest trolley bus systems in the country, with seven routes and a fleet of 120 "trolley coaches" – the common name for this mode at that time – built by Mack Trucks. Six trolley bus routes were still intact when RCT took over all of PTC's bus lines in 1956, and these continued under RCT operation, but the Eastmoreland and Sellwood routes were electric only until the end of 1956.

Rose City attempted to discontinue permanently all trolley bus service in January 1958, in part to eliminate the regulatory control of the state Public Utility Commission (PUC), which had some authority over operating franchises involving streetcars and trolley buses, but not of companies that operated only motor buses. RCT replaced all remaining electric buses with diesel- or gasoline-powered buses on January 29, 1958, on what had been the last four trolley bus routes: Interstate Avenue, Mississippi, Sandy Blvd. and St. Johns. However, the company soon discovered it did not have enough serviceable motor buses to be able reliably to maintain the scheduled service. Trolley bus service resumed on all four routes after only one month, on February 25, 1958, but the reprieve for electric transit lasted only a few months. The company again discontinued all remaining trolley bus service on October 23, 1958, in the late morning, when 16 of the remaining 31 active trolley buses were taken off their routes and driven back to the garage. The city council was upset with the move, but back on January 29 it had passed an emergency ordinance giving RCT the authority to abandon its trolley coach service during a dispute over a requested fare increase, a move the council made so as to keep the state's PUC from asserting jurisdictional control. On October 22, Portland Commissioner William Bowes filed an emergency ordinance to repeal the earlier ordinance and stop RCT from abandoning its trolley service, but the company began dismantling key parts of the overhead wires the day after service ended; the new council ordinance never came to a vote. RCT offered few details for its action, but told city officials that it was "necessitated" by an impending problem with federal taxes.

== New buses ==
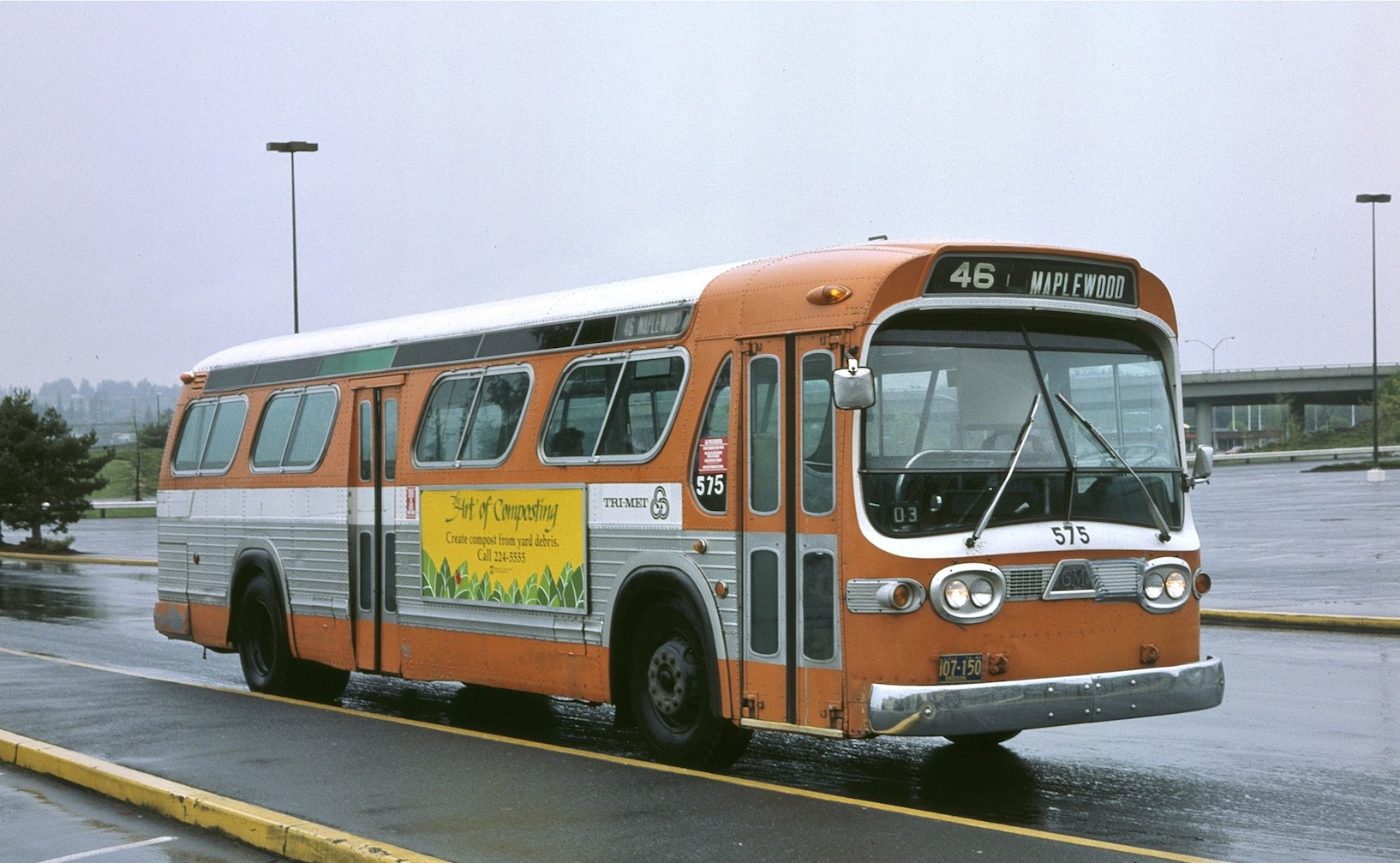
1966 GM bus 575, pictured in 1985 wearing Tri-Met's first color scheme, was the last bus purchased by Rose City Transit. It and others of its type passed to Tri-Met in 1969, and the last examples were in service until 1985.

During its first few years, RCT's bus fleet was rather old. As of 1958, some buses over 20 years old were still in service, and the youngest buses in the fleet dated from 1951, when 27 buses had been purchased. The company made its first purchase of new buses in 1961, but of only five vehicles, 35-foot General Motors "New Look"-type buses. At that time, the active fleet comprised 202 buses, and 182 were scheduled to be in service each day in peak periods. When the city council granted RCT a 10-year operating franchise in 1962, one stipulation was that the company had to purchase at least 70 new buses within five years. The company complied, proceeding to purchase another 70 buses of the same type, delivered in four batches between 1963 and 1966. These 75 buses (numbered 501–575) were the only new buses RCT ever bought. The paint scheme of Rose City's buses was red and cream, originally a bright red as used in pre-RCT days by the Portland Traction Company, but later changed to a darker red.

== Nickname ==
Rose City Transit dubbed a new downtown "shoppers' special" route as "Rosy" when the service was introduced in 1957, but "Rosy" later became a nickname for RCT itself, used both by the company and by the general public. The company also used the name "Rosy" for an advertising character, a bus with eyes and an elephant's trunk, a reference to a popular resident of the Portland Zoo (from 1953 to 1993), a pachyderm named Rosy who was the zoo's very first elephant.

== Problems ==
The privately owned company struggled financially during several periods. Providing mass transit service was increasingly an unprofitable business during the post-World War II period, when private car ownership in the U.S. was growing rapidly.

Portland transit ridership declined steadily every year, and several of RCT's requests for permission to raise fares were turned down by the city council. Numerous times over the years, RCT and the council argued about fares and service issues. Tensions between the two at times prompted calls for the transit system to be municipalized, as had already happened in several other West Coast cities, including San Francisco and Seattle. At the beginning of 1962, Portland and San Diego were the only two major West Coast cities whose transit systems were still privately owned. Proposition 55, on the May 1962 municipal ballot, would have issued $6.5 million in general-obligation bonds and established a 10-year tax levy to cover RCT's $300,000 annual operating deficit, created a new city Transit Commission, and given the city authority to take over the transit system if a majority of council approved. The city's voters turned it down by a 7-to-5 ratio. The three-day suspension of all RCT service in November 1968, angered the council and again led to consideration of municipalizing the system.

In 1966, RCT was sued by the suburban "Blue Bus" lines consortium, after announcing plans to extend service into areas that were outside the city and which the Blue Bus companies considered to be their territory. The court ruled in favor of RCT, and the expansion proceeded.

== Transition to public ownership ==
By 1968 Rose City Transit Company was nearly bankrupt. It sought council permission for another fare increase (to 40 cents) and threatened to discontinue all service if this was not approved. On December 12, 1968, the city council declined to vote on the request and instead voted unanimously to revoke RCT's franchise, effective in six months, and to plan for the city to take over the transit system after that period. Commissioner William Bowes explained that it was felt the long trend of ever-increasing fares and declining patronage seen under private ownership was not sustainable, and that it was in the public interest for the transit system to be municipalized.

In January 1969, mayor Terry Schrunk appointed a seven-member Mass Transit Advisory Commission to examine the issues and consider options for the future of public transit in the city. In June, it recommended that the city take over the system, taking possession of its vehicles and properties and giving RCT revenue certificates for the appraised value, an action the city said was provided for under the franchise agreement. However, other factors complicated the situation and delayed action for months. RCT said it considered the city's termination of the franchise to be invalid and continued to press for a fare increase. Meanwhile, in May 1969, the Oregon Legislature approved a bill (House Bill 1808) allowing the creation of multi-county mass transit districts with taxing authority and boards of directors to be appointed by the governor. The city council postponed the original mid-June takeover date by 60 days, but by August, the conflict between the city and Rose City Transit was far from resolved and appeared likely to go to court.

On October 1, 1969, the city council passed a resolution calling for the establishment of a new Portland metropolitan area transit district. More specifically, the resolution called on Governor Tom McCall to appoint a seven-member board to administer the transit district, under the provisions of the new state legislation (House Bill 1808). The area would soon have a regional transit authority, rather than one run by the city of Portland. Within one week, McCall had made all seven appointments to what was provisionally referred to as the Portland Metropolitan Mass Transit District. About one month later the transit district had been formally named the Tri-County Metropolitan Transportation District, or "Tri-Met" for short.

In mid-November, RCT was still asserting that the city's termination of its franchise was "illegal" and was awaiting a Multnomah County court ruling on the matter. The contract with its union employees had expired on October 31, and negotiations on a new contract had broken down, with the union calling for a strike to start on December 1, the date that Tri-Met was anticipating taking over the service. Meanwhile, the city council granted Tri-Met a permit to operate buses – over RCT's "strenuous objections" – and Tri-Met was trying to make arrangements to buy or lease about 100 buses from other cities, with which to provide service if RCT declined the city's offer to purchase its fleet. The city and RCT were far apart on a purchase price for RCT's buses, and negotiations were not bringing them significantly closer. On November 19, RCT President Charles C. Bowen offered to allow the city to take immediate possession of the transit system if they agreed to continue the current litigation and abide by whatever the courts ultimately decided, on both the question of whether the franchise termination had been legal and on determining the fair value of the assets involved, for compensation to RCT and Landport Inc. (A third lawsuit was also in process, to determine whether RCT would be required to pay retirement pensions of its retired employees.) After additional negotiations, an agreement for the city to take possession of the system – and immediately transfer it to Tri-Met – was approved by the city council on November 28, only a little more than 48 hours before a strike had been scheduled to take place and shut down the system.

Tri-Met took over operation of the entire Rose City Transit system on December 1, 1969, using the same buses and workers and serving the same routes. The transit union had shifted its negotiations from RCT to Tri-Met and canceled its planned strike, and a new 19-month contract was approved by the agency's board on the same day that Tri-Met took over the system. At the end of Rose City Transit's management, Portland's city transit system was carrying about 65,000 riders a day.

The lawsuits were not finally concluded until 1971, with court rulings in May in favor of the City of Portland and Tri-Met on the matters of franchise termination and retirement benefits. The court's ruling on the asset valuation came six weeks later. The fair value was set at $2.9 million (equivalent to $23 million in 2025), which was $200,000 more than the city had offered, but was far less than the $5.5 million Rose City Transit had asserted to be their value. The ruling on the franchise termination was upheld on appeal in 1974.

== See also ==
- Transportation in Portland, Oregon
