= Rivergrove, Oregon =

- City

- Location in Oregon

- Location in the United States Rivergrove, Oregon (the United States)
- Coordinates: 45°23′10″N 122°44′25″W
- Country: United States
- State: Oregon
- Counties: Clackamas, Washington
- Incorporated: 1971

Government
  - Mayor: Jeff Williams

Area
  - Total: 0.18 sq mi (0.46 km^{2})
  - Land: 0.17 sq mi (0.45 km^{2})
  - Water: 0.0039 sq mi (0.01 km^{2})
- Elevation: 128 ft (39 m)

Population (2020)
  - Total: 545
  - Density: 3,148/sq mi (1,215.5/km^{2})
- Time zone: UTC-8 (Pacific)
  - Summer (DST): UTC-7 (Pacific)
- ZIP code: 97035
- Area codes: 503 and 971
- FIPS code: 41-62250
- GNIS feature ID: 2410964
- Website: www.cityofrivergrove.org

Rivergrove is a city in Clackamas County, Oregon, United States. A small portion of the city extends into nearby Washington County. Its name is a portmanteau of the Tualatin River, which forms its southern border, and Lake Grove, a community that is now part of Lake Oswego. Interstate 5 forms the western border, with Childs Road serving as the northern border for much of the city. The population was 545 at the 2020 census.

== History ==
Rivergrove came into existence January 27, 1971, after a vote of 57 to 48 in favor of incorporation.

== Geography ==
According to the United States Census Bureau, the city has a total area of 0.16 square miles (0.41 km^{2}), all land.

There are two public parks located in the city; Lloyd Minor Park & Heritage Park.

== Government ==
The Rivergrove City Council is composed of five elected representatives.

Fire protection and EMS services are provided through Tualatin Valley Fire and Rescue. The city does not have a police department, with law enforcement via the Clackamas County Sheriff's Office.

== Demographics ==
Historical population
Census	Pop.	Note	%±
1980	314		—
1990	294		−6.4%
2000	324		10.2%
2010	370		14.2%
2020	545		47.3%
U.S. Decennial Census

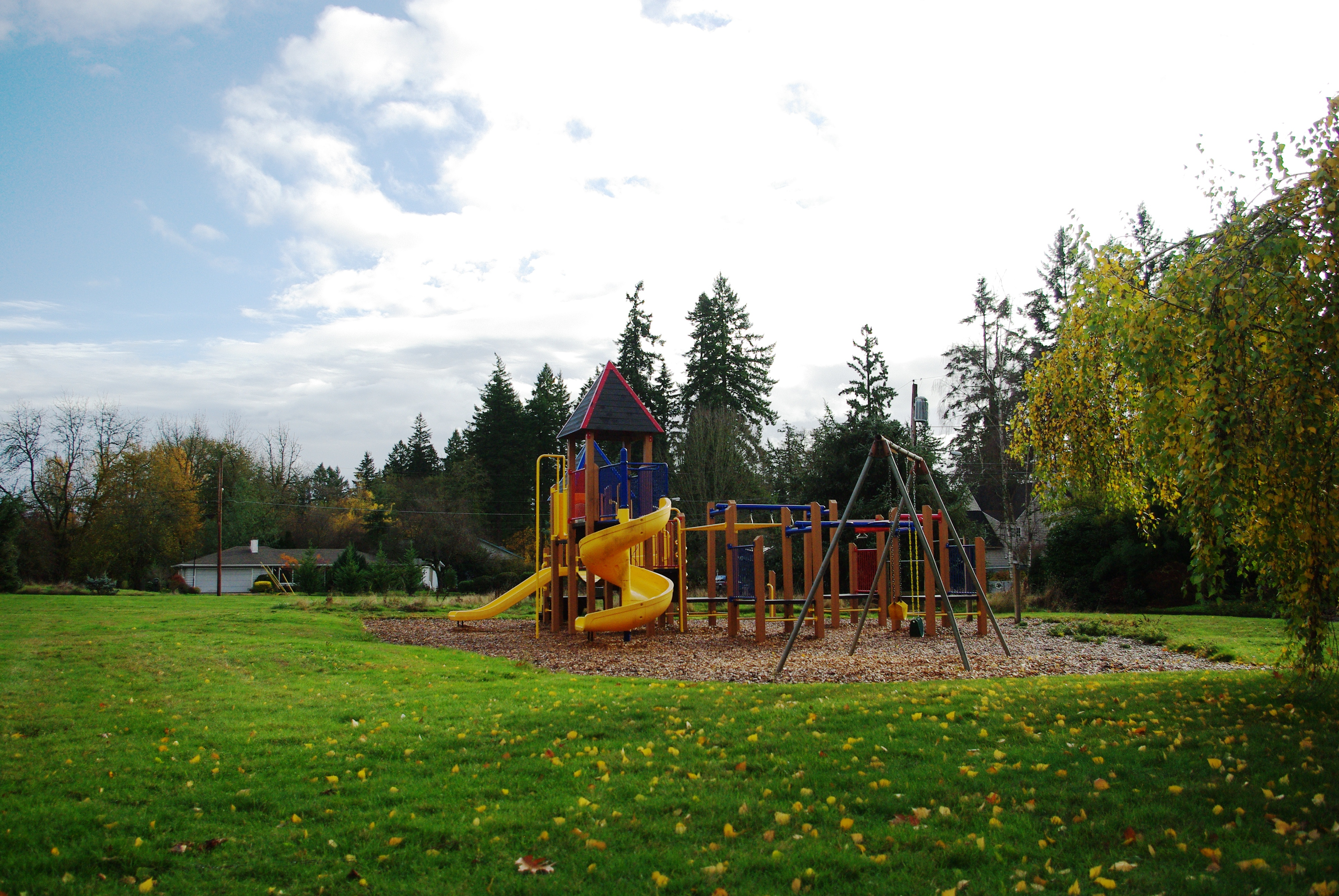
Lloyd Minor Park in the city

=== 2020 census ===
As of the 2020 census, Rivergrove had a population of 545. The median age was 42.8 years; 29.5% of residents were under the age of 18 and 16.9% were 65 years of age or older. For every 100 females, there were 101.1 males, and for every 100 females age 18 and over there were 95.9 males age 18 and over.

All residents lived in urban areas, while none lived in rural areas.

There were 188 households in Rivergrove, of which 45.7% had children under the age of 18 living in them. Of all households, 68.1% were married-couple households, 8.5% were households with a male householder and no spouse or partner present, and 17.0% were households with a female householder and no spouse or partner present. About 15.5% of all households were made up of individuals and 10.2% had someone living alone who was 65 years of age or older. There were 204 housing units, of which 7.8% were vacant. Among occupied housing units, 91.5% were owner-occupied and 8.5% were renter-occupied. The homeowner vacancy rate was <0.1% and the rental vacancy rate was 5.9%.

Racial composition as of the 2020 census
Race	Number	Percent
White	397	72.8%
Black or African American	8	1.5%
American Indian and Alaska Native	1	0.2%
Asian	73	13.4%
Native Hawaiian and Other Pacific Islander	3	0.6%
Some other race	10	1.8%
Two or more races	53	9.7%
Hispanic or Latino (of any race)	25	4.6%

=== 2010 census ===
As of the 2010 census, there were 505 people, 155 households, and 120 families living in the city. The population density was 1,806.3 inhabitants per square mile (697.4/km^{2}). There were 155 housing units at an average density of 831.3 per square mile (321.0/km^{2}). The racial makeup of the city was 94.1% White, 3.1% Asian, 0.3% from other races, and 2.4% from two or more races. Hispanic or Latino of any race were 2.4% of the population.

There were 155 households, of which 26.8% had children under the age of 18 living with them, 61.8% were married couples living together, 4.1% had a female householder with no husband present, 3.3% had a male householder with no wife present, and 30.9% were non-families. 25.2% of all households were made up of individuals, and 9.8% had someone living alone who was 65 years of age or older. The average household size was 2.35 and the average family size was 2.82.

The median age in the city was 49.5 years. 21.1% of residents were under the age of 18; 3.6% were between the ages of 18 and 24; 17.3% were from 25 to 44; 39.9% were from 45 to 64; and 18.3% were 65 years of age or older. The gender makeup of the city was 54.7% male and 45.3% female.

=== 2000 census ===
As of the census of 2000, there were 324 people, 117 households, and 87 families living in the city. The population density was 1,807.9 inhabitants per square mile (698.0/km^{2}). There were 122 housing units at an average density of 680.7 per square mile (262.8/km^{2}). The racial makeup of the city was 93.83% White, 2.47% Asian, 1.54% from other races, and 2.16% from two or more races. Hispanic or Latino of any race were 2.78% of the population.

There were 117 households, out of which 34.2% had children under the age of 18 living with them, 69.2% were married couples living together, 3.4% had a female householder with no husband present, and 24.8% were non-families. 18.8% of all households were made up of individuals, and 4.3% had someone living alone who was 65 years of age or older. The average household size was 2.77 and the average family size was 3.18.

In the city, the population was spread out, with 27.5% under the age of 18, 4.3% from 18 to 24, 28.7% from 25 to 44, 32.4% from 45 to 64, and 7.1% who were 65 years of age or older. The median age was 39 years. For every 100 females, there were 94.0 males. For every 100 females age 18 and over, there were 102.6 males.

The median income for a household in the city was $85,000, and the median income for a family was $93,212. Males had a median income of $58,125 versus $40,500 for females. The per capita income for the city was $31,546. About 4.8% of families and 4.7% of the population were below the poverty line, including 8.6% of those under age 18 and none of those age 65 or over.

== Education ==
The portion in Clackamas County (the majority of the municipality) is in the Lake Oswego School District. Residents are zoned to River Grove Elementary School, Lakeridge Middle School, and Lakeridge High School.

The portion in Washington County is in the Tigard-Tualatin School District 23J.
