= List of transit centers in the United States =

A transit center or transportation center is major transit hub served by multiple bus and/or rail lines.

Key to modes
Bus	Bus Rapid Transit	People mover	Light rail	Rapid transit	Intercity bus	Intercity rail

Name	City	State	Mode(s)
12th & Imperial Transit Center	San Diego	California	B LR GH
69th Street Transit Center	Upper Darby	Pennsylvania	B LR RT
Addison Transit Center	Addison	Texas	B LR
Alum Rock Transit Center	San Jose	California	B BRT LR
Appleton Transit Center	Appleton	Wisconsin	B GH AB
Arcata Transit Center	Arcata	California	B GH AB
Arrott Transit Center	Philadelphia	Pennsylvania	B RT
Balboa Avenue Transit Center	San Diego	California	B LR
Barbur Boulevard Transit Center	Portland	Oregon	B
Beaverton Transit Center	Beaverton	Oregon	B LR CR
Bellevue Transit Center	Bellevue	Washington	B LR
Blake Transit Center	Ann Arbor	Michigan	B CB GH
Brentwood Transit Center	Brentwood	Missouri	B LR
Brooklyn Center Transit Center	Brooklyn Center	Minnesota	B BRT
Burnett Transit Center	Houston	Texas	B LR
Central West End Transit Center	St. Louis	Missouri	B LR
Chester Transit Center	Chester	Pennsylvania	B CR
Civic Center Transit Center	St. Louis	Missouri	B LR
Clackamas Town Center Transit Center	Clackamas	Oregon	B LR
Clayton Transit Center	Clayton	Missouri	B LR
Dearborn Transit Center	Dearborn	Michigan	B AM
Dover Transit Center	Dover	Delaware	B
Downtown Transit Center	Houston	Texas	B LR
East Plano Transit Center	Plano	Texas	B LR
Eastridge Transit Center	San Jose	California	B LR (Note: Under construction.) GH
El Cajon Transit Center	San Diego	California	B LR GH
Eltingville Transit Center	Staten Island	New York	B CB
Escondido Transit Center	Escondido	California	B LR GH
Fashion Valley Transit Center	San Diego	California	B LR
Federal Way Transit Center	Federal Way	Washington	B LR GH
Fern Rock Transit Center	Philadelphia	Pennsylvania	B RT CR
Frankford Transit Center	Philadelphia	Pennsylvania	B RT
Fulton Street Transit Center	New York City	New York	RT
Gateway Transit Center	Portland	Oregon	B LR
Great Mall Transit Center	Milpitas	California	B LR
Gresham Central Transit Center	Gresham	Oregon	B LR
Grossmont Transit Center	La Mesa	California	B LR
Gwinnett Place Transit Center	Atlanta	Georgia	B
Harbor Gateway Transit Center	Gardena	California	B BRT
Hercules Transit Center	Hercules	California	B GH
Hillsboro Transit Center	Hillsboro	Oregon	B LR
Hollywood Transit Center	Portland	Oregon	B LR
Houston Intermodal Transit Center	Houston	Texas	B LR GH AM (Note: Planned, then cancelled.)
Iris Avenue Transit Center	San Diego	California	B LR
J.B. Jackson, Jr. Transit Center	Dallas	Texas	B LR
Jack Hatchell Transit Center	Plano	Texas	B
Jason Hargrove Transit Center	Detroit	Michigan	B
Jefferson Park Transit Center	Chicago	Illinois	B BRT RT CR
John D. Dingell Transit Center	Dearborn	Michigan	B AM
John W. Olver Transit Center	Greenfield	Massachusetts	B GH AM
Julia M. Carson Transit Center	Indianapolis	Indiana	B
Kimball Junction Transit Center	Kimball Junction	Utah	B
King of Prussia Transit Center	King of Prussia	Pennsylvania	B
Lackawanna Transit Center	Scranton	Pennsylvania	B CR (Note: Proposed.) GH AB
Lake Oswego Transit Center	Lake Oswego	Oregon	B
LAX/Metro Transit Center	Los Angeles	California	B CB PM RT
Lexington Transit Center	Lexington	Kentucky	B
Lewes Transit Center	Lewes	Delaware	B
Lockheed Martin Transit Center	Sunnyvale	California	B LR
Magnolia Park Transit Center	Houston	Texas	B LR
Manteca Transit Center	Manteca	California	B CB CR
McBean Regional Transit Center	Santa Clarita	California	B CB
Milwaukie Transit Center	Milwaukie	Oregon	B
Montclair Transit Center	Montclair	California	B BRT GH CR
Mount Timpanogos Transit Center	Orem	Utah	B
Norristown Transit Center	Norristown	Pennsylvania	B LR CR
North Hanley Transit Center	St. Louis	Missouri	B LR
North Irving Transit Center	Irving	Texas	B
North Lamar Transit Center	Austin	Texas	B BRT LR (Note: Planned.)
North Lombard Transit Center	Portland	Oregon	B LR
Northline Transit Center/HCC	Houston	Texas	B LR
Oceanside Transit Center	Oceanside	California	B CR GH AM
Old Town Transit Center	San Diego	California	B LR GH AM
Olney Transit Center	Philadelphia	Pennsylvania	B RT
Oregon City Transit Center	Oregon City	Oregon	B
Overlake Transit Center	Redmond	Washington	B LR
Oxnard Transit Center	Oxnard	California	B CR GH AM
Palm Center Transit Center	Houston	Texas	B LR
Palomar Street Transit Center	Chula Vista	California	B LR
Parkrose/Sumner Transit Center	Portland	Oregon	B
Pence-Cole Valley Transit Center	Spokane	Washington	B LR
Pennsauken Transit Center	Pennsauken	New Jersey	B LR CR
Redondo Beach Transit Center	Redondo Beach	California	B
Ramp A/7th Street Transit Center	Minneapolis	Minnesota	B BRT LR
Richardson Transit Center	Richardson	Texas	B LR
Richmond Parkway Transit Center	Richmond	California	B
Riverfront Transit Center	Cincinnati	Ohio	B CB BRT CR
Rosa Parks Hempstead Transit Center	Hempstead	New York	B CR GH
Rosa Parks Transit Center	Detroit	Michigan	B PM GH
Rose Quarter Transit Center	Portland	Oregon	B LR
Rosedale Transit Center	Roseville	Minnesota	B BRT
Salesforce Transit Center	San Francisco	California	B GH
San Bernardino Transit Center	San Bernardino	California	B BRT LR GH
San Rafael Transit Center	San Rafael	California	B GH CR
San Ysidro Transit Center	San Diego	California	B LR
SDSU Transit Center	San Diego	California	B LR
Shrewsbury Transit Center	St. Louis	Missouri	B LR
South Garland Transit Center	Garland	Texas	B
Spokane Community College Transit Center	Spokane	Washington	B BRT
State Fair Transit Center	Detroit	Michigan	B
Sunset Transit Center	Beaverton	Oregon	B LR
Takoma Langley Crossroads Transit Center	Langley Park	Maryland	B
Texas Medical Center Transit Center	Houston	Texas	B LR
Tigard Transit Center	Tigard	Oregon	B CR
Torrance Transit Center	Torrance	California	B
Tracy Transit Center	Tracy	California	B GH CR
Trenton Transit Center	Trenton	New Jersey	B CR AM
Troy Transit Center	Troy	Michigan	B AM
UTC Transit Center	San Diego	California	B LR
Vallejo Transit Center	Vallejo	California	B GH AB ferry
Vista Transit Center	Vista	California	B LR
Washington Square Transit Center	Tigard	Oregon	B
Wayne Route 23 Transit Center	Wayne	New Jersey	B CR
West Chester Transit Center	West Chester	Pennsylvania	B
Westgate Transit Center	Austin	Texas	B BRT
White Plains TransCenter	White Plains	New York	B GHL CR
Wilsonville Transit Center	Wilsonville	Oregon	B CR
Willow Creek Transit Center	Hillsboro	Oregon	B LR

== See also ==
- List of TriMet transit centers
- Transport hubs by country
- Transport hub
