= Southwest Corridor (TriMet) =

Proposed Rail line in Oregon, U.S.

Overview
- Owner: TriMet
- Locale: Portland, Oregon, U.S.
- Termini: PSU South in downtown Portland (north); Bridgeport Village (south)
- Stations: 14
- Website: SW Corridor Light Rail Project

Service
- Type: Light rail
- System: MAX Light Rail
- Operator: TriMet

History
- Opened: proposed

Technical
- Number of tracks: 2
- Track gauge: 4 ft 8 1/2 in (1,435 mm) standard gauge
- Electrification: Overhead line, 750 V DC

The Southwest Corridor is a proposed public transportation rail line in and near Portland, Oregon for TriMet's MAX Light Rail.

== History ==
The Portland metropolitan area's regional government, Metro, adopted the 2035 Regional Transportation Plan in June 2010 where it identified a segment of OR 99W between Portland and Sherwood as the region's next highest-priority "high-capacity transit" corridor. In January 2011, The Federal Transit Administration (FTA) granted Metro $2 million to begin studying the formally named "Southwest Corridor". The funds focused on the assessment of various mode alternatives, including light rail, commuter rail, streetcar, and bus rapid transit. The Southwest Corridor Plan officially launched that September, formalizing the development of a unified transportation plan between the involved communities and jurisdictions. In June 2013, the project steering committee selected light rail and bus rapid transit as the alternatives for further consideration. Citing a lack of present and future demand, the steering committee eliminated further planning using the alternatives to Sherwood. They also rerouted the proposed alignment in Tigard through the Tigard Triangle in response to local opposition to the removal of auto lanes from OR 99W.

In June 2014, the steering committee determined a refined route for further study that ran from the southern end of the Portland Transit Mall in downtown Portland to just east of Tualatin station in downtown Tualatin; this route was later shortened to terminate at Bridgeport Village. The following year, proposals to serve Marquam Hill and Hillsdale with tunnels were dropped from the plan because they would be too costly, have severe construction impacts, and attract few new transit riders. In May 2016, the steering committee selected light rail as the preferred mode alternative over bus rapid transit. They also removed a tunnel to PCC Sylvania from further consideration. After passing a measure requiring voters to approve the construction of any high-capacity transit built within city limits, Tigard voters approved the light rail extension the following September.

At an estimated cost of $2.6 billion to $2.9 billion, the project was included in a regional transportation funding measure called "Get Moving 2020". In light of a budget gap of $462 million, planners proposed reducing lanes on Barbur Boulevard and shortening the line's route to terminate in downtown Tigard. Both proposals were rejected in November 2019. Private negotiations, as well as Metro's approval to increase the project's requested budget by $125 million in the 2020 ballot measure, reduced the budget gap to around $100 million. On November 3, 2020, voters rejected the measure. Had it been approved, the extension would have begun construction in 2022 and opened by 2027. It had been expected to serve approximately 37,500 riders by 2035.

In April 2025 a TriMet spokesperson confirmed that the agency's long-term Strategic Transit Vision includes a re-envisioned version of the Southwest Corridor Light Rail Project, with the Yellow Line to be extended along the originally proposed route.

== Proposed route ==
The proposed route stretches from:

- The Portland Transit Mall in Downtown Portland
- Southbound following Barbur Boulevard and Interstate 5
- Barbur Transit Center
- Stations near Portland Community College Sylvania Campus
- A station near Tigard Transit Center
- Terminus at Bridgeport Village Mall

The rail line would go through the cities of Tigard and Tualatin.

== Stations ==
TriMet proposes stations at:

- Portland State University/Portland Transit Mall
- SW Gibbs Street (Oregon Health & Science University/Portland Aerial Tram)
- SW Hamilton Street
- SW 13th Avenue
- SW 19th Avenue
- SW 30th Avenue
- Barbur Boulevard Transit Center
- SW 53rd Avenue (Portland Community College Sylvania Campus)
- SW 68th Parkway
- Elmhurst
- SW Hall Boulevard (Tigard Transit Center)
- SW Bonita Road (Portland Temple)
- SW Upper Boones Ferry Road
- Bridgeport
