= Salem-Keizer =

Salem-Keizer may refer to:

- Salem Metropolitan Statistical Area, which includes the cities of Salem and Keizer, Oregon, United States
- Salem-Keizer School District
- Salem-Keizer Transit, currently known as Cherriots
- Salem-Keizer Volcanoes, a minor league baseball team
