= Wilsonville Transit Center =

Railway station in Wilsonville, Oregon

Wilsonville TC
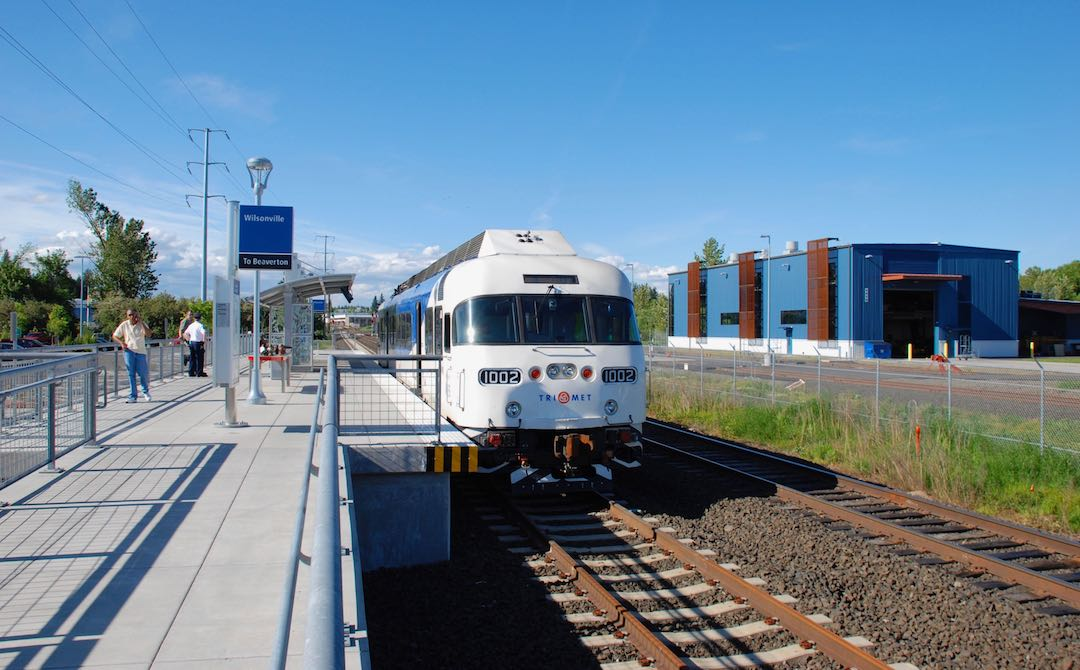
- Train at the WES platform, with the WES maintenance building in the background

General information
- Other names: SMART Central at Wilsonville Station
- Location: 9699 Southwest Barber Street; Wilsonville, Oregon, U.S.
- Coordinates: 45°18′41″N 122°46′31″W
- Owner: City of Wilsonville
- Line: Portland and Western Railroad
- Platforms: 1 side platform
- Tracks: 2

Construction
- Parking: 400 park and ride spaces
- Accessible: yes

History
- Opened: January 2009

Services
Preceding station	TriMet	Following station
Terminus	WES Commuter Rail	Tualatin toward Beaverton Transit Center
Location

Wilsonville Transit Center, also called SMART Central at Wilsonville Station, is a bus and commuter rail transport hub in Wilsonville, Oregon, United States. The transit center, which is owned and operated by the City of Wilsonville, is the hub for the South Metro Area Regional Transit (SMART) bus system. The Portland metropolitan area's regional transit agency, TriMet, operates the southern terminus of its WES Commuter Rail at the facility; WES connects with the Blue and Red lines of MAX Light Rail at Beaverton Transit Center. Opened in January 2009, the transit center includes a 400-car park and ride.

== History ==
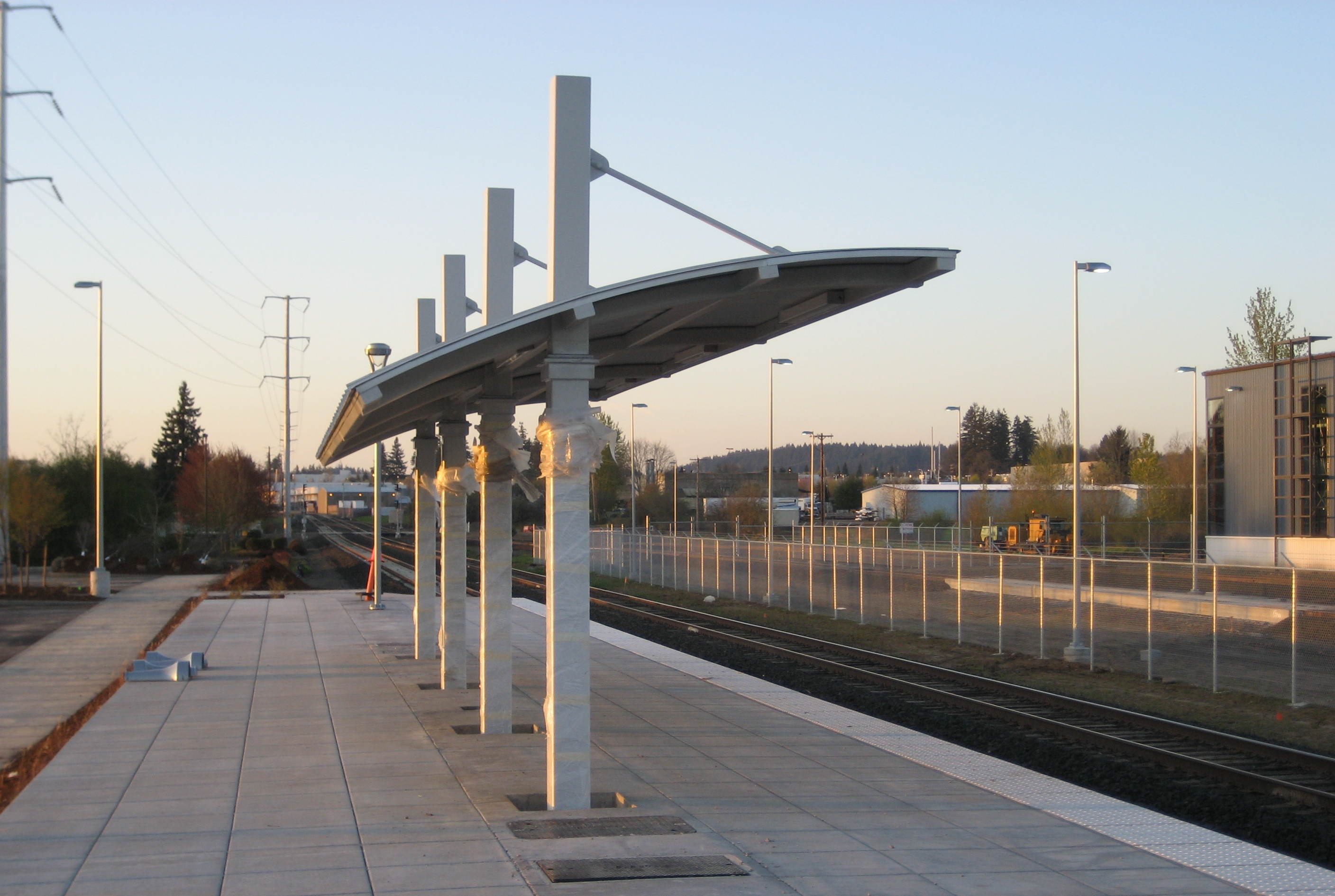
The WES platform under construction in 2008

Plans for the commuter rail between Beaverton and Wilsonville began as early as 1996, led by Washington County officials. In 2001, the Federal Transit Administration authorized the project, and in 2004 it approved the project, by which time regional transit agency TriMet had taken over as the lead agency in planning the project. Construction began in October 2006. The station was originally planned to be built at Boberg Road, and was later changed to the location on Barber Street as suggested by the Villebois developers.

On March 2, 2007, a groundbreaking ceremony was held at the station's site, attended by officials from TriMet, the state, and Wilsonville politicians. These included former mayor and then state representative Jerry Krummel, an early proponent of the line. The public artwork was installed on September 3, 2008. The line was scheduled to begin service in September 2008, but delays led to an opening in January 2009.

== Details ==
The station is the southernmost of five on the 14.7-mile (23.7 km) rail line that utilizes Portland & Western Railroad's freight rail line. Located on Barber Street on the west side of Interstate 5, the station and line are in operation only during the morning and evening commute times, Monday through Friday. Averaging 37 miles per hour (60 km/h), each trip between Wilsonville and Beaverton is scheduled to take 27 minutes, and trains depart every 45 minutes. Wilsonville station has bus connections through SMART, connecting to Canby Area Transit, and a shared route to Salem with Cherriots.

Wilsonville station, WES's southern terminus, was built by contractor Stacy Witbeck. The stop includes a park-and-ride lot with 400 spaces along with the platform. The platform includes a shelter for waiting passengers measuring 40 feet (12 m) long. The station includes 12 bays for the transit center and a 17,000-square-foot (1,600 m^{2}) maintenance building for SMART buses. Future plans call for a mixed-use development to include SMART offices, retail shops and restaurants, along with public restrooms, bicycle storage and an outdoor play area.

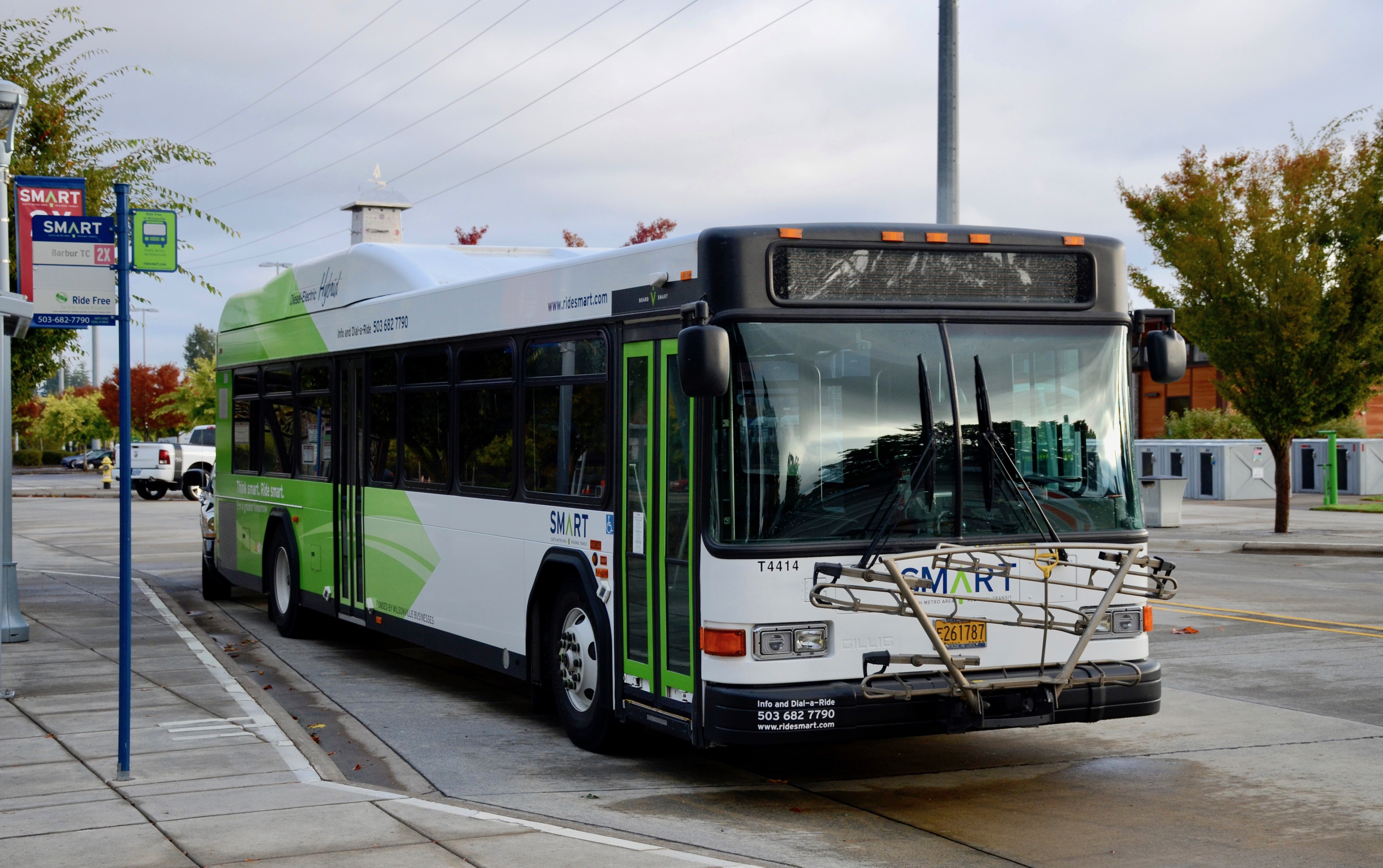
A SMART bus at the transit center in 2018

Additional amenities at the station are wind screens, public artwork, and a scored-concrete plaza featuring trees. Public art consists of an interactive sculpture created by Frank Boyden and Brad Rude. The sculpture features bronze heads and a vehicle designed to represent the train and the variety of people who ride the line. The vehicle can be moved (by hand) along a track and has an animal figure displayed in a scene atop the piece. Additionally, glass in the windbreak is etched with a willow pattern.

Commuters from the surrounding communities of Lake Oswego, Canby, Donald, Woodburn, and Aurora are expected to utilize the station. Washington County provided the land for Wilsonville station. Self-propelled, diesel-fueled rail cars are used for the line. The park-and-ride lot was partly built to allow for interconnection between the city's SMART bus service and the rail line. For the first five years of operation, Wilsonville paid a maximum of $300,000 a year to help fund the annual operations of the TriMet-operated line.
