= Tualatin Park & Ride =

The Tualatin Park & Ride is a transit center located in the Oregon city of Tualatin, served by the Portland metropolitan transit agency TriMet. It is located adjacent to the Bridgeport Village shopping center.

== Current service ==
In addition to TriMet service, service south to Wilsonville is provided by SMART transit.

The following bus lines serve this location:

- POINT-Cascades
- 76-Hall/Greenburg
- 96-Boones Ferry Rd
- SMART Route 2X: Tualatin Park & Ride

Discontinued 8/23/26

- 37-Lake Grove
- 38-Boones Ferry Road
