= Milwaukie/Main St station =

Light rail station in Milwaukie, Oregon, U.S.

Milwaukie/Main St
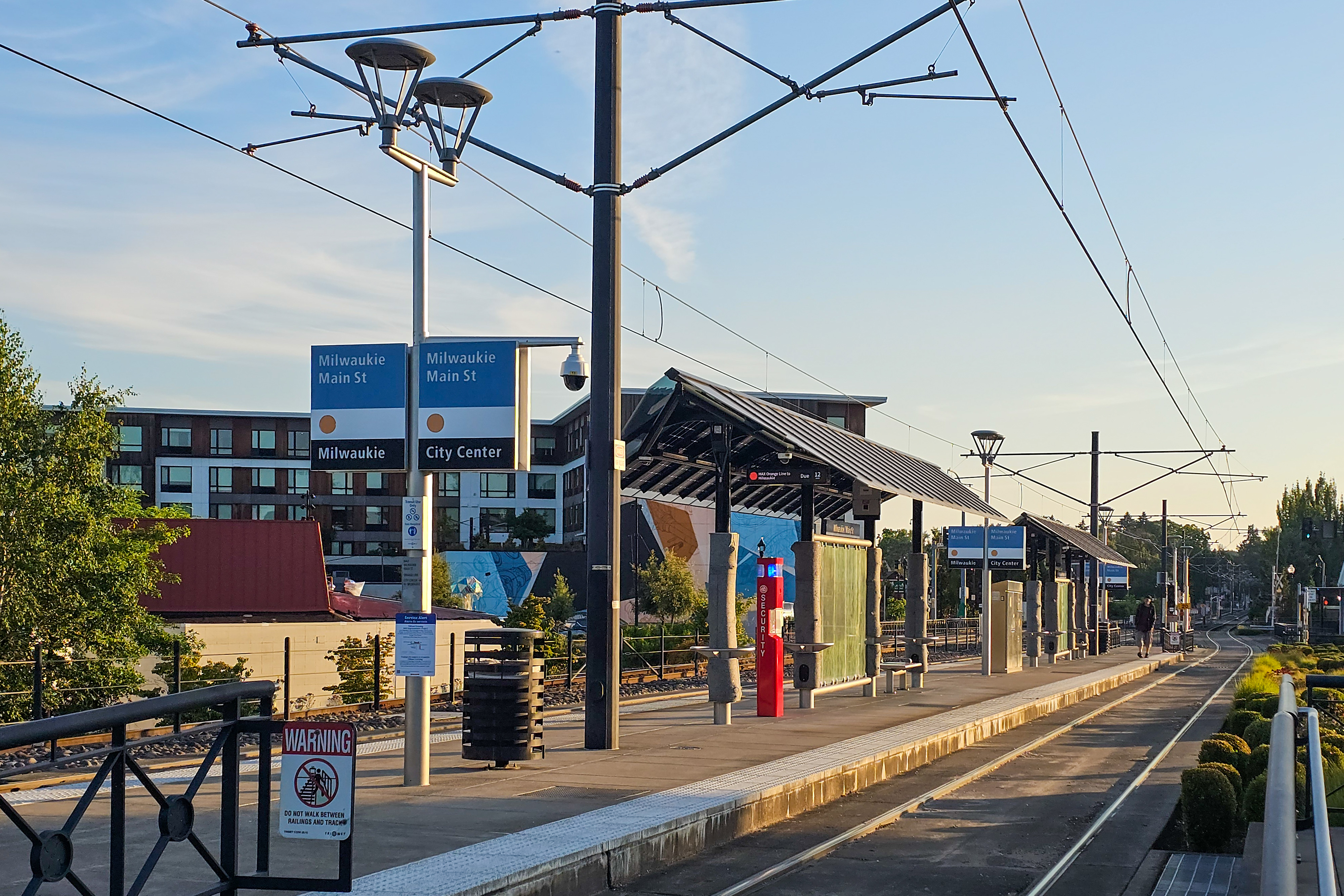
- The station platform in 2026, facing north

General information
- Location: 11301 Southeast 21st Avenue; Milwaukie, Oregon, United States
- Coordinates: 45°26′28″N 122°38′24″W
- Owner: TriMet
- Platforms: 1 island platform
- Tracks: 2
- Bus routes: 4
- Connections: TriMet: 29, 33, 34

Construction
- Cycle facilities: 12 lockers and 36 rack spaces
- Accessible: yes

History
- Opened: September 12, 2015

Services
Preceding station	TriMet	Following station
SE Park Ave Terminus	Orange Line	SE Tacoma/Johnson Creek toward PSU South/SW 6th & College
Location

Milwaukie/Main St is a light rail station in downtown Milwaukie, Oregon, United States, served by TriMet as part of MAX Light Rail. It is the second northbound station on the Orange Line, preceded by the terminus at SE Park Ave. The station is located along Union Pacific Railroad right-of-way on a site bounded by Lake Road, SE 21st Avenue, and Adams Street near the city's post office. Amenities at the station including bike parking and connections to TriMet bus routes 29, 33, and 34; it also has no parking spaces for cars. Milwaukie Station, a food cart pod, is adjacent to the station.

Milwaukie/Main St station was built as part of the Portland–Milwaukie Light Rail Project, which extended MAX from downtown Portland to Milwaukie in Clackamas County.

== Station details ==
A center island platform serves both northbound and southbound trains. The station area was designed so that it could accommodate a future second platform and station building.

== Services ==
Milwaukie/Main St station is the second northbound station on the MAX Orange Line. Trains run from the station northbound to PSU South/SW 6th & College station in downtown Portland and southbound to SE Park Ave station in Oak Grove. Most northbound Orange Line trains through operate into the Yellow Line at PSU South/SW 6th & College station and continue to Expo Center station in North Portland.

Train headways measure from 15 minutes during most of the day to 30 minutes in the early mornings and late evenings. The station connects with TriMet bus routes 29–International Way, 33–McLoughlin/King Rd, and 34–Oatfield/River Rd.

== See also ==
- Milwaukie Transit Center – former transit center
