= List of TriMet transit centers =

TriMet transit centers are defined by TriMet as "major transit hub[s] served by several bus or rail lines". These transit centers are often key areas for accessing public transportation throughout the extended Portland metropolitan area.

== Current transit centers ==
Name	City	Location	Year opened	Image
Barbur Boulevard Transit Center	Portland	9750 SW Barbur Blvd.	1977	Barbur Blvd. Transit Center
Beaverton Transit Center (second location)	Beaverton	4050 SW Lombard Ave.	1988	Beaverton Transit Center
Clackamas Town Center Transit Center (second location)	Clackamas	9225 SE Sunnyside Rd.	2009	Clackamas Town Center Transit Center
Gateway/Northeast 99th Avenue Transit Center	Portland	9900 NE Multnomah St.	1986	
Gresham Central Transit Center	Gresham	350 NE 8th St.	1982	
Hillsboro Central/Southeast 3rd Avenue Transit Center (commonly known simply as Hillsboro Transit Center, the second TC with that name)	Hillsboro	333 SE Washington St.	1998	Hillsboro Central/Southeast 3rd Avenue Transit Center
Lake Oswego Transit Center	Lake Oswego	4th St. and A Ave.	1984	Lake Oswego Transit Center
North Lombard Transit Center	Portland	N Interstate and Lombard	2004	North Lombard Transit Center
Oregon City Transit Center	Oregon City	1035 Main St.	1991	Oregon City Transit Center
Parkrose/Sumner Transit Center	Portland	9481 NE Sandy Blvd.	2001	Parkrose/Sumner Transit Center
Rose Quarter Transit Center (originally called Coliseum TC)	Portland	47 NE Holladay St.	1986	Rose Quarter Transit Center
Sunset Transit Center	Beaverton	10470 SW Barnes Rd.	1998	Sunset Transit Center
Tigard Transit Center	Tigard	8960 SW Commercial St.	1988	Tigard Transit Center
Washington Square Transit Center	Tigard	9585 SW Washington Square Rd.	1994	Washington Square Transit Center
Willow Creek/Southwest 185th Avenue Transit Center	Hillsboro	395 SW 185th Ave.	1998	Willow Creek/Southwest 185th Avenue Transit Center

== Former transit centers ==
Name	City or community	Location	Year opened	Year closed or delisted as a TC	Image
Beaverton Transit Center (first location)	Beaverton	unnamed street south of Broadway and west of Lombard in central Beaverton	1979	1988	The first Beaverton Transit Center
Burlingame Transit Center	Portland	SW Bertha Blvd. and Barbur Blvd.	1984	2001	
Cedar Hills Transit Center	Cedar Hills	SW Wilshire Street east of Marlow Street (behind Cedar Hills Shopping Center)	1979	1998	Cedar Hills Transit Center
Clackamas Town Center Transit Center (first location)	Clackamas	SE Monterrey Avenue, north side of Clackamas Town Center mall	1981	2006	The first Clackamas Town Center TC
Hillsboro Transit Center (first location)	Hillsboro	SW Baseline Street east of Dennis Avenue	1988	1996	The first Hillsboro Transit Center
Hollywood/Northeast 42nd Avenue Transit Center	Portland	1410 NE 42nd Ave.	1986	2024	Hollywood Transit Center
Milwaukie Transit Center	Milwaukie	Jackson Street and 21st Avenue	1981	2010	
Rockwood Transit Center	Gresham	SE 188th Avenue between Burnside Street and Stark Street, at Rockwood/E 188th Ave. MAX station	1986	2010	Rockwood Transit Center

Note: Rose Quarter Transit Center was originally named Coliseum Transit Center. It was renamed in 1994, but the location remained the same, and the facilities did not change at that time.

== See also ==
- List of MAX Light Rail stations
