= Lextran =

Public transportation bus system in Lexington, Kentucky

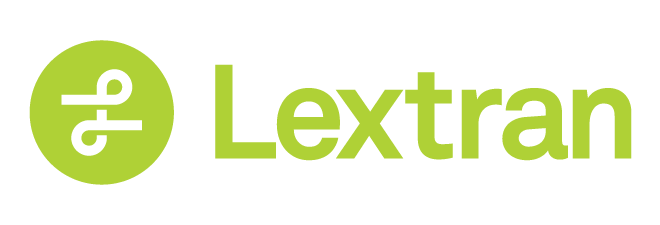
- Parent: Lexington-Fayette Urban County Government
- Founded: April 1972
- Headquarters: 200 West Loudon Avenue, Lexington, KY
- Locale: Lexington and Fayette County
- Service area: Lexington Urban Service Boundary
- Service type: Transit bus, Paratransit
- Routes: 24
- Stops: 900
- Hubs: Lexington Transit Center
- Fleet: 65
- Daily ridership: 13,100 (weekdays, Q1 2026)
- Annual ridership: 3,686,800 (2025)
- Fuel type: Mixed fleet (diesel, hybrid-electric, and electric)
- Operator: Transit Authority of LFUGC
- Website: www.lextran.com

Lextran (officially the Transit Authority of the Lexington-Fayette Urban County Government) is a public transportation bus system serving Lexington, Kentucky. Lextran operates 25 bus routes throughout the city of Lexington. Buses converge at the Downtown Transit Center located at 220 East Vine Street. In 2025, the system had a ridership of 3,686,800, or about 13,100 per weekday as of the first quarter of 2026.

Lextran operates seven days a week from 5:00 am to midnight. Through a partnership with the Bluegrass Area Chapter of the American Red Cross, Lextran also operates Wheels. Lextran Wheels is a shared ride, door-to-door public transportation service for Lexington-Fayette County area citizens with disabilities. Lextran also provides service to the University of Kentucky, operating two routes around campus.

Even though Lexington and Fayette County are a consolidated government, Lextran does not provide service outside the city of Lexington.

== History ==
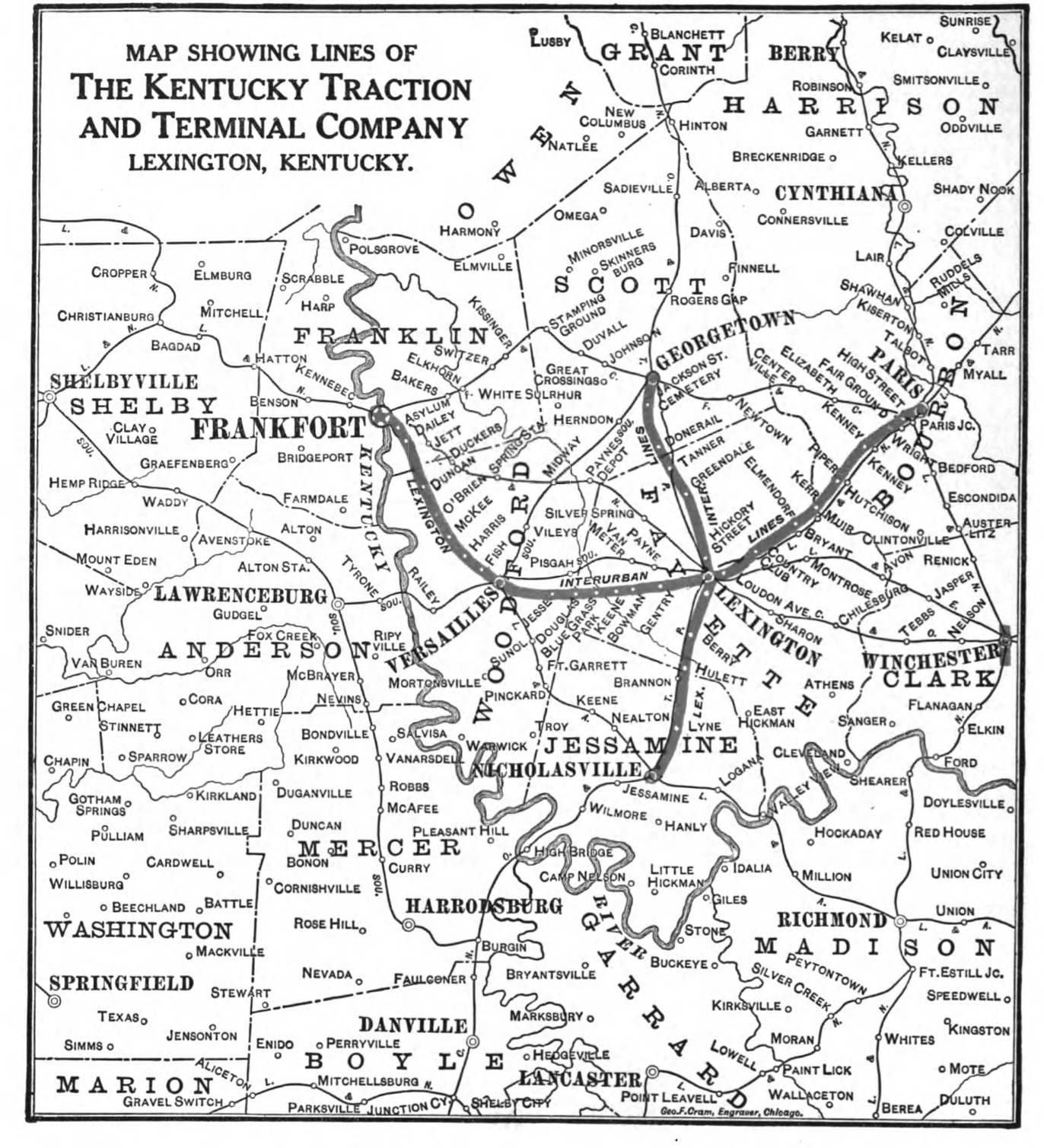
Map of Kentucky Traction and Terminal Company lines, 1912

Prior to Lextran's current existence, Lexington was served by numerous private transit systems. The first such system was the Lexington Railway Company streetcars, which began operation in 1874 and used horse-drawn stagecoaches. The name changed to the Lexington Street Railway Company soon after to avoid confusion with the steam railroads. In 1890, the system was upgraded to streetcars and was referred to as the Kentucky Traction and Terminal Company. The streetcars ceased operations in 1938 when they were replaced by motorized buses under the Lexington Railway System name, which later became the Lexington Transit Corporation.

By the early 1970s, expenses associated with the operation of the motorized buses soon outstripped revenue for the Lexington Transit Corporation. In April 1972, the Lexington-Fayette Urban County Government incorporated the system under the local government and renamed the system Lextran. In 1997, Lextran introduced the Lexington Bluegrass Mobility Office. It offers carpooling and vanpooling computer ridematching services and LexVan, a work commute vanpool leasing program.

In 2003–2004 Lextran bought 13 low-floor 35-foot Thomas buses and 6 low-floor Gillig 40 feet buses in an attempt to make the system more accessible to those with physical disabilities.

In 2004, the system received additional funding from a successful ballot initiative to implement a new property tax dedicated to helping fund the Lextran system. Since the tax referendum passed, Lextran's system has grown by 50%, and the number of passenger boardings and operators more than doubled.

In 2007, Lextran received several upgrades to its fleet of buses and facilities. A renovation and expansion of the main Lextran facilities on East Loudon Avenue expected to cost $7.5 million Lextran was also seeking $3.1 million for new buses, $1.5 million for an Automated Vehicle Locator, and $800,000 to purchase new fare boxes. Phase one of the expansion project includes the construction of a new bus fuel and wash building at 109 West Loudon Avenue, along with upgrades to the restrooms and break room at the Downtown Transit Center. Additionally, Lextran phased out all of their high-floor buses except for vans making all mainlines very accessible for those with disabilities.

In 2009, Lextran bought 3 Gillig trolleys to start their trolley service. Even though trolley service is limited to specific events, Lextran still uses these buses on lower ridership lines, as they are the same size as the smaller low-floor Gillig 29 feet buses.

In 2011, Lextran purchased 2 new hybrid electric and 5 Gillig 29-foot buses to be used on lower ridership routes.

Between 2012 and 2014, Lextran purchased an additional 6 Gillig 40-foot buses

In 2016, the bus fleet will increase from 73 as of January 2016 to 76 with 5 new Proterra electric buses and 7 new Gillig CNG buses, with 9 of Lextran's oldest Thomas transit buses similar to the European Dennis Dart being retired. In addition, the new Lextran depot is located at 200 West Loudon Avenue, which was the location of an old General Electric manufacturing plant. This new depot will allow much more space for on-site bus and employee parking compared to the old depot. There is also more space for maintenance facilities, which are all fully equipped for all of their buses.

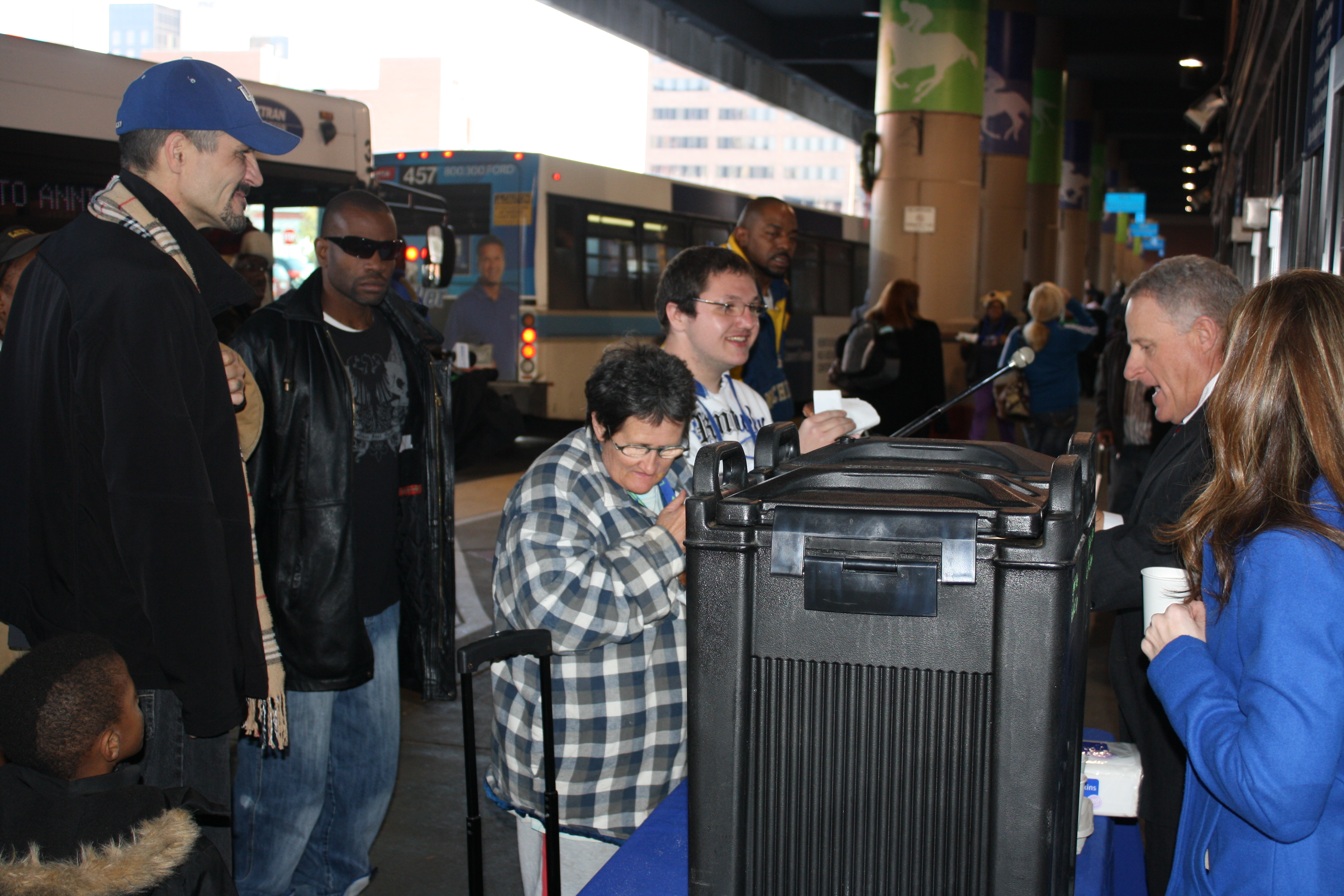
At the Downtown Transit Center during the 40th Anniversary.

== Routes ==
- Route 1 – Woodhill Drive
- Route 2 – Georgetown Road
- Route 3 – Tates Creek Road
- Route 4 – Newtown Pike
- Route 5 – Nicholasville Road
- Route 6 – North Broadway
- Route 7 – North Limestone
- Route 8 – Versailles Road
- Route 9 – Eastland
- Route 10 – Hamburg Pavilion
- Route 11 – Richmond Road
- Route 12 – Leestown Road
- Route 13 – South Broadway
- Route 14 – UK Blue and White
- Route 15 – Red Mile
- Route 16 – Southland Drive
- Route 17 – Northside Connector
- Route 18 – Centre Parkway Connector
- Route 22 – Mercer Road
- Route 24 – Old Frankfort Pike
- Route 27 – UK Yellow
- Route 51 – Night – Woodhill Drive
- Route 52 – Night – Georgetown Road
- Route 58 – Night – Versailles Road
- Route 59 – Night – Eastland

== Route Frequency ==
Mainlines are considered to be Routes 1–13. These routes operate from a 5:00 am departure until the midnight arrival at the Downtown Transit Center. Mainlines run every 35 minutes; some mainlines with lower ridership will reduce frequency during the day to only once every 70 minutes. On August 10, 2021, Lextran announced a Temporary Weekday Service Reduction on Six Routes which affected several mainline routes. All mainlines are bi-directional until the 9:20 pm departure where some routes become combined routes with a nearby line, with one traveling outbound and the other inbound. Routes on Saturdays have reduced frequency with only once per hour frequency. Sunday routes are similar to Saturday routes, running once an hour. Sunday schedules run from 5:45 am to 9:00 pm, concluding with the final bus arriving at the Downtown Transit Center. Route 16—Southland Drive is not considered a mainline bus but still leaves from the Downtown Transit Center throughout the day (6:20 am–7:00 pm once every 70 minutes).

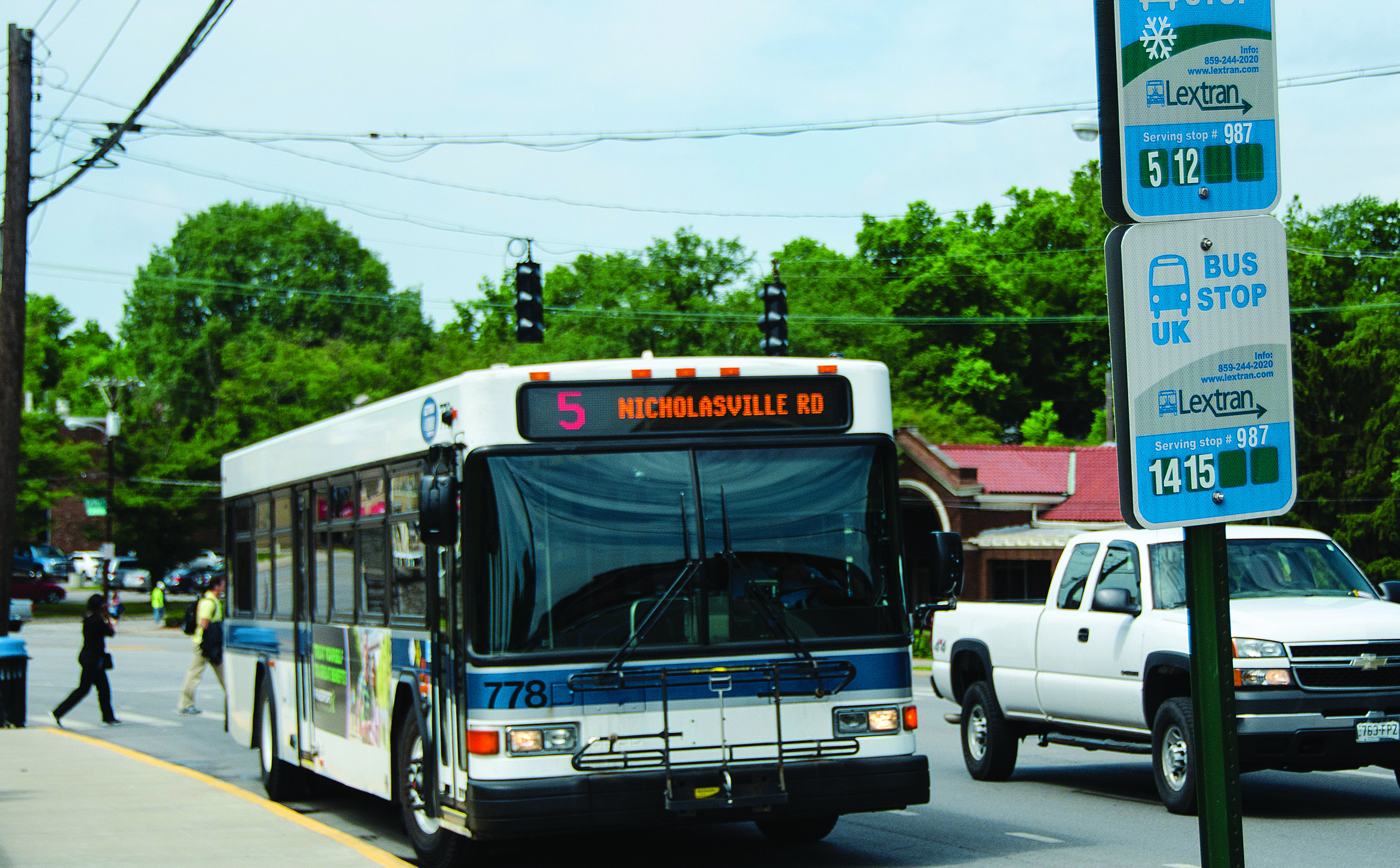
Lextran bus at the University of Kentucky, 2015

Route 14—UK Blue and White and Route 15—Red Mile are circular routes that serve the UK Community and have the same fare as all other buses in Lextran. However, Lextran and the University of Kentucky partner to provide the Free City Transit program. Free City Transit allows all UK students, faculty, staff, and retirees to ride any Lextran route for free, simply by showing their valid Wildcard ID. UK passengers must present their Wildcard ID each time they board. The program is available year-round, but some routes run on an abbreviated schedule or not at all during summer months and holidays.

Route 17—Northside Connector and Route 18—Centre Parkway Connector are connecting routes that service areas not normally served by mainlines. Only Route 18 – Centre Parkway Connector provides service outside of peak hours and on Saturdays.

== Fleet ==
Year	Manufacturer	Model	Fleet Numbers	Fuel Type	Length of bus	Notes
2004	Gillig	Low Floor	456-461	Diesel	40 feet	456 active.
2007	Gillig	Low Floor	766-782	Diesel	40 feet	
2011	Gillig	Low Floor Trolley	30-32	Hybrid	35 feet	31 & 32 active
2011	Gillig	Low Floor Hybrid	790-791	Hybrid	35 feet	
2011	Gillig	Low Floor	792-796	Diesel	29 feet	
2012	Gillig	Low Floor	1201	Diesel	40 feet	
2012	Gillig	Low Floor	1202–1203	Hybrid	40 feet	
2014	Gillig	Low Floor	1401–1403	Diesel	40 feet	
2016	Gillig	Low Floor	1501–1507	CNG	35 feet	First CNG buses in fleet.
2016	Proterra	Catalyst 40	1601–1605	Electric	40 feet	Not in service.
2017	Gillig	Low Floor	1701–1705	CNG	40 feet	
2018	Proterra	Catalyst 40	1801	Electric	40 feet	Not in service.
2019	Gillig	Low Floor	1901–1906	CNG	40 feet	
2021	Gillig	Low Floor	2101-2104	CNG	40 feet	Entered service April 2021.
2021	Gillig	Battery Electric	2110-2111	Electric	40 feet	2110 entered service September 2021. 2111 entered service March 2022.
2022	Gillig	Low Floor	2201-2204	CNG	40 feet	
2023	Gillig	Low Floor	2301-2307	CNG	40 feet	Entered service October 2023.
2024	Gillig	Battery Electric	2401-2403	Electric	40 feet	

== Average Daily Weekday Ridership by Route ==
These are statistics gathered from Lextran's Automatic People Counter during the Fall 2019 Bid Period.

Route	Name	Average Ridership	Notes
1	Woodhill Drive	536	
2	Georgetown Road	475	
3	Tates Creek Road	1,109	
4	Newtown Pike	637	
5	Nicholasville Road	1,730	
6	North Broadway	911	
7	North Limestone	798	
8	Versailles Road	915	
9	Eastland	631	
10	Hamburg Pavilion	715	
11	Richmond Road	566	
12	Leestown Road	331	
13	South Broadway	411	
14	UK Blue and White Routes	5,513	Free circulator.
15	Red Mile	1,873	Circulator
16	Southland Drive	54	Limited
17	Northside Connector	24	Circulator
18	Centre Parkway Connector	125	Circulator
21	Airport/Keeneland	198	Limited, currently operated as Route 8 to Airport/Keeneland.
22	Mercer Road	232	Limited
24	Old Frankfort Pike	23	Limited
27	UK Yellow Route	680	Free circulator, operated weekends only.
51	Night Woodhill/Richmond	53	Night combo route.
52	Night Georgetown/Leestown	42	Night combo route.
58	Night Versailles/South Broadway	85	Night combo route.
59	Night Eastland/North Limestone	58	Night combo route.

== See also ==
- List of bus transit systems in the United States
