= South Clackamas Transportation District =

Bus network serving Clackamas County, Oregon, United States

- Founded: 1989
- Headquarters: Molalla
- Locale: Clackamas County, Oregon
- Service type: bus service
- Routes: 3
- Destinations: Canby and Clackamas Community College
- Website: http://sctd.org/

The South Clackamas Transportation District (SCTD) is a bus service that provides public transportation in Molalla, Oregon, connecting that city to Clackamas Community College (and TriMet, which formerly provided the service) in Oregon City, and Canby (and Canby Area Transit). The cost to ride to or from CCC is only US$1; rides to or from Canby used to be free, but now also cost US$1.

The district was formed by the Clackamas County Board of Commissioners in 1989, originally as the Molalla Transportation District (and later renamed South Clackamas Transportation District), to replace TriMet service. Molalla withdrew from the TriMet district on January 1, 1989. In the 2001 Fiscal Year (which started on July 1, 2000), the district's budget was approximately $700,000 ($1,243,000 2024). SCTD is funded by a mix of funds, including an employer payroll and self employment tax levied on employers and the self employed within the district's boundaries. As of 2000, the tax rate was three-tenths of a percent. The current rate is five-tenths of one percent (0.5 percent).

== Routes ==
- Molalla to Clackamas Community College
- Intra-City Bus Route
- Molalla to Canby
