= Canby Area Transit =

Public transit bus service in Oregon, US

- Founded: 2002
- Locale: Canby, Oregon
- Service type: bus service, paratransit
- Website: CAT homepage

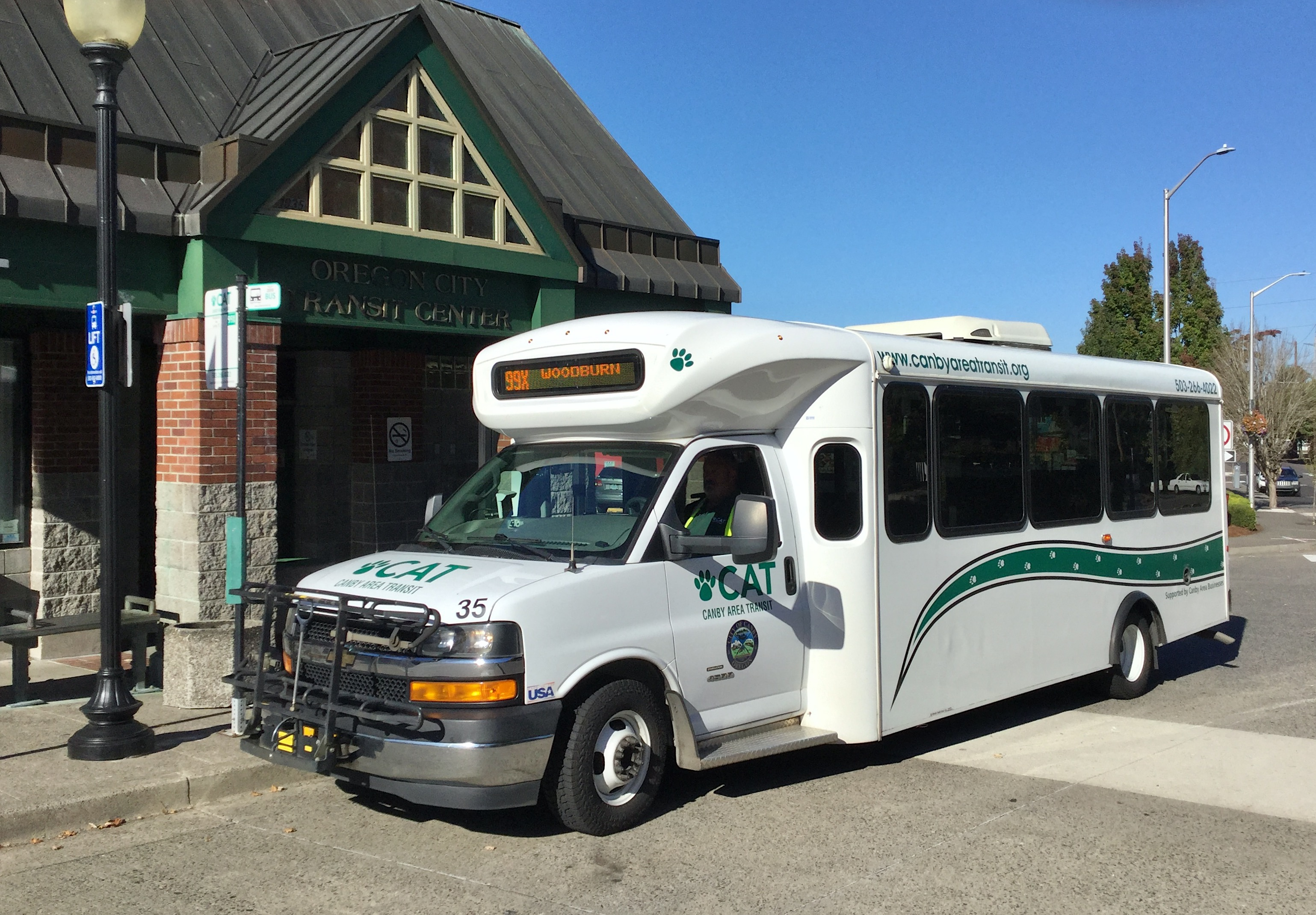
A CAT minibus at Oregon City Transit Center in 2024

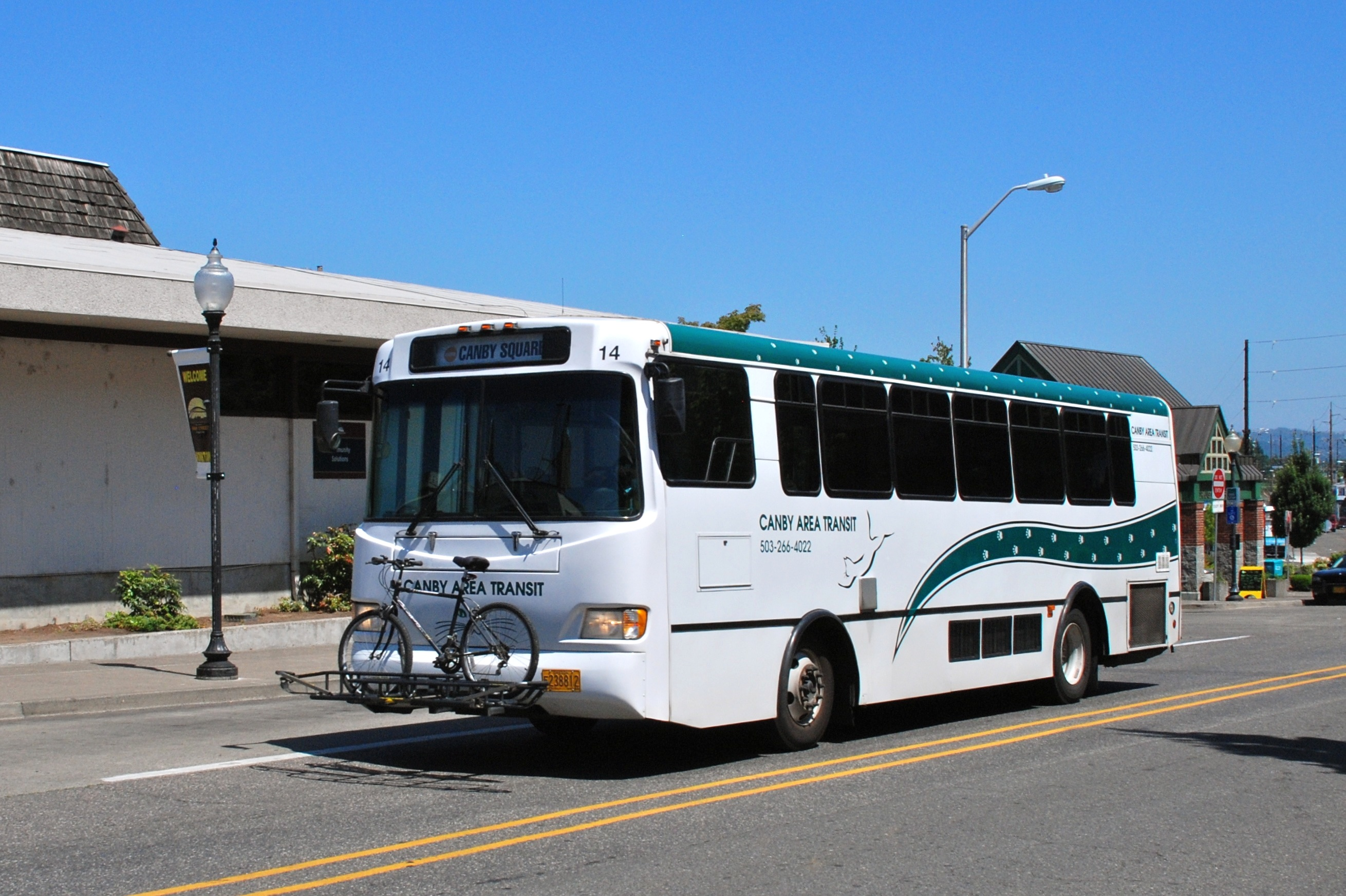
A larger CAT bus, of a type now retired, in 2011

Canby Area Transit, or simply CAT, is the public transit bus service provided by and for the US city of Canby, Oregon. As of 2015, it operates one fixed route between Woodburn, Canby and Oregon City along Oregon Route 99E, complementary paratransit, and a dial-a-ride service within the city of Canby. It has a hub at the downtown Canby Transit Center.

CAT was established as a department of the City of Canby on January 1, 2002 upon Canby's withdrawal from the TriMet service area, and had an official dedication on August 20, 2002. Canby paid TriMet to continue service in the interim, and replaced TriMet's commuter runs in 2004, which received little ridership at the end. CAT also expanded service within the city of Canby, to Woodburn and to Wilsonville, the latter in partnership with Wilsonville's South Metro Area Regional Transit. Canby replaced TriMet's payroll tax with its own within the city, but at a somewhat lower rate, and also receives state and federal grants.

Due to the loss of state tax credits and recession-caused tax revenue decreases, CAT had to eliminate Saturday service, fixed-route service within Canby and trips to Wilsonville, as well as started charging a $1 fare. In exchange, they started to allow the general public to use dial-a-ride service within Canby that was previously limited to eligible disabled riders, and SMART continued to operate its trips from Wilsonville.

== Connecting systems ==
CAT connects to the following systems:

- TriMet at the Oregon City Transit Center
- South Metro Area Regional Transit (SMART) service to Wilsonville at Canby Transit Center
- South Clackamas Transportation District (SCTD) service to Molalla at Canby Transit Center
- Woodburn Transit System (WTS) at Woodburn
- Cherriots Regional to Silverton and Salem at Woodburn
