= South Metro Area Regional Transit =

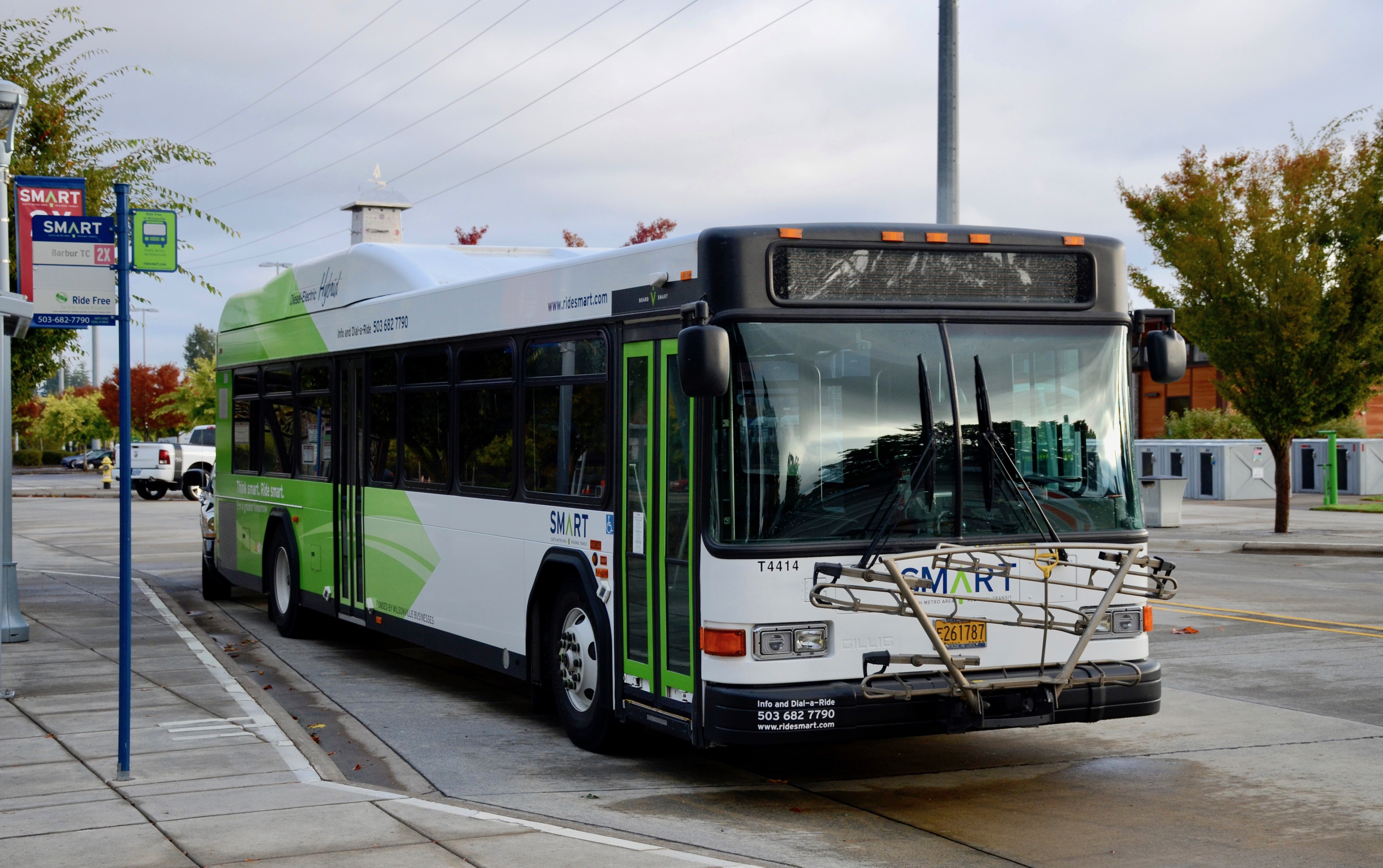
- Low-floor Gillig hybrid electric bus at SMART Central transit center at Wilsonville Station
- Founded: 1989
- Headquarters: 28879 SW Boberg Road
- Locale: Wilsonville, Oregon
- Service type: bus service, dial-a-ride
- Routes: 7
- Fleet: 32
- Fuel type: Diesel, CNG, Hybrid, Electric
- Operator: City of Wilsonville
- Website: ridesmart.com

South Metro Area Regional Transit (SMART) is a public transit system operated by the city government of Wilsonville, Oregon, United States. The system currently consists of seven routes and is funded by local businesses. It was created when Wilsonville petitioned to withdraw from the TriMet service district in the late 1980s.

== History ==
After complaints from local business owners who felt they were having to pay too much in payroll tax to support the regional transit agency, TriMet, with little or no bus service being provided in exchange, the city decided to file a formal petition to withdraw from the TriMet district. Such withdrawals were allowed, if the municipality met certain conditions, under a law enacted by the Oregon Legislature in 1987. Wilsonville's petition to withdraw from the TriMet district was approved by the transit agency's board on November 30, 1988, and the withdrawal took effect on January 1, 1989. A condition of the TriMet ordinance permitting the withdrawal was that Wilsonville had to provide replacement transit service for at least one year. The change enabled the city to reduce the rate of the payroll tax levied on area businesses for transit from 0.6 percent to 0.3 percent. Initially, the city provided the required replacement service by contracting with TriMet, which in turn contracted with Buck Ambulance to give service with vans. However, Wilsonville later prepared to begin managing the service directly and to increase marketing of it, in hopes of improving ridership.

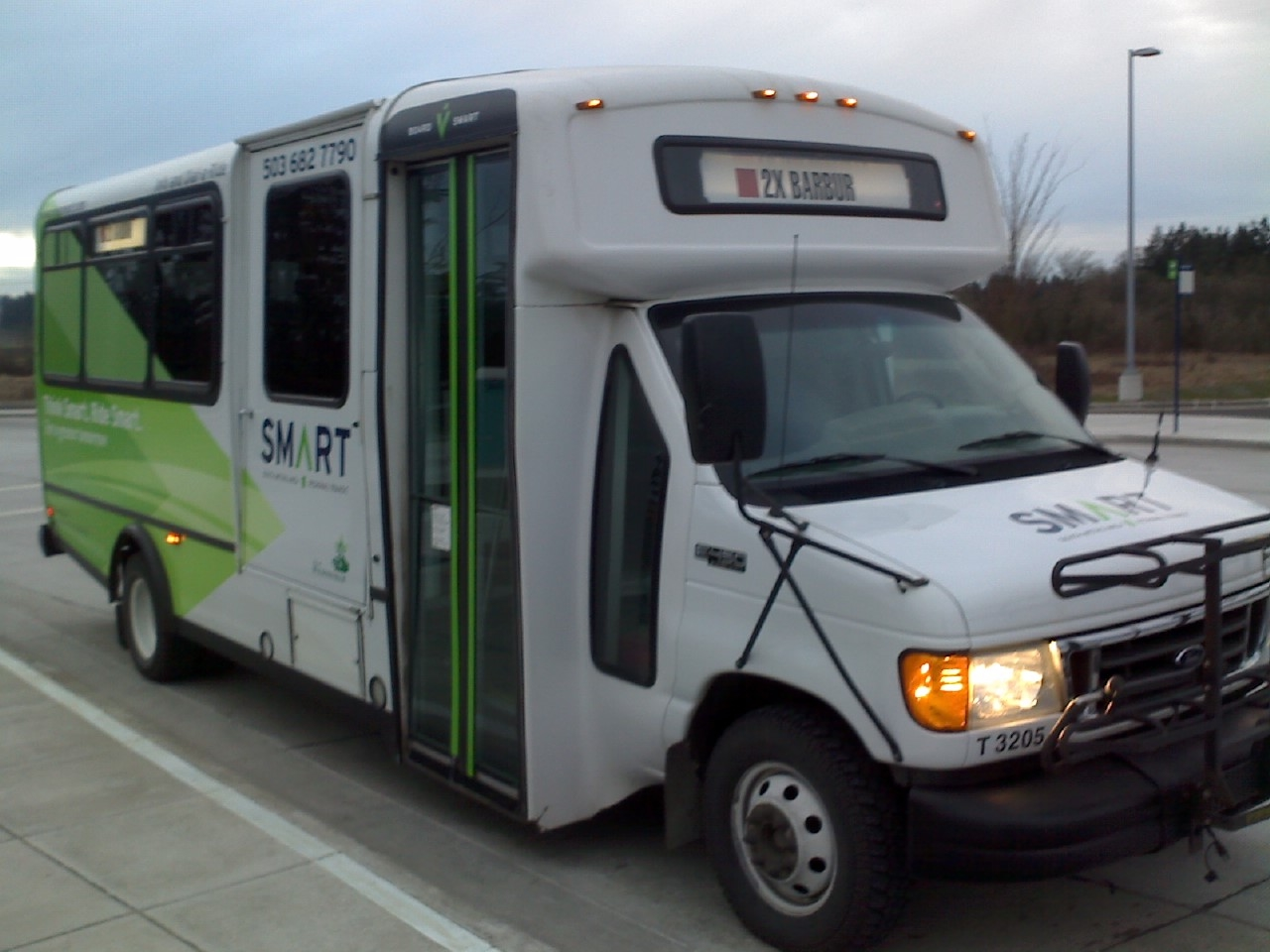
Minibus on route 2X-Barbur

In 1990, the city council approved naming the Wilsonville bus system WART, for Wilsonville Area Rapid Transit. Aware that the name was likely to inspire a few jokes, city officials proposed using a leaping frog in a new logo to be created, in order to show they had a sense of humor. The service was free at all times.

In 1993, following a city-sponsored contest to rename the transit system, the city council approved changing WART to SMART, or South Metro Area Rapid Transit. The first full-size buses were put into service later the same year. Most service until then was dial-a-ride, door-to-door service. Following the acquisition of five used full-size buses, SMART introduced a new fixed route, 201, connecting Wilsonville with TriMet service at the regional agency's Tualatin Park-and-Ride lot and its Barbur Boulevard Transit Center, on November 1, 1993, and this was followed by the launching of a route to Oregon City (route 202), connecting with other TriMet routes there. From 1999 to 2000, a lunchtime bus service was operated between businesses and the commercial center.

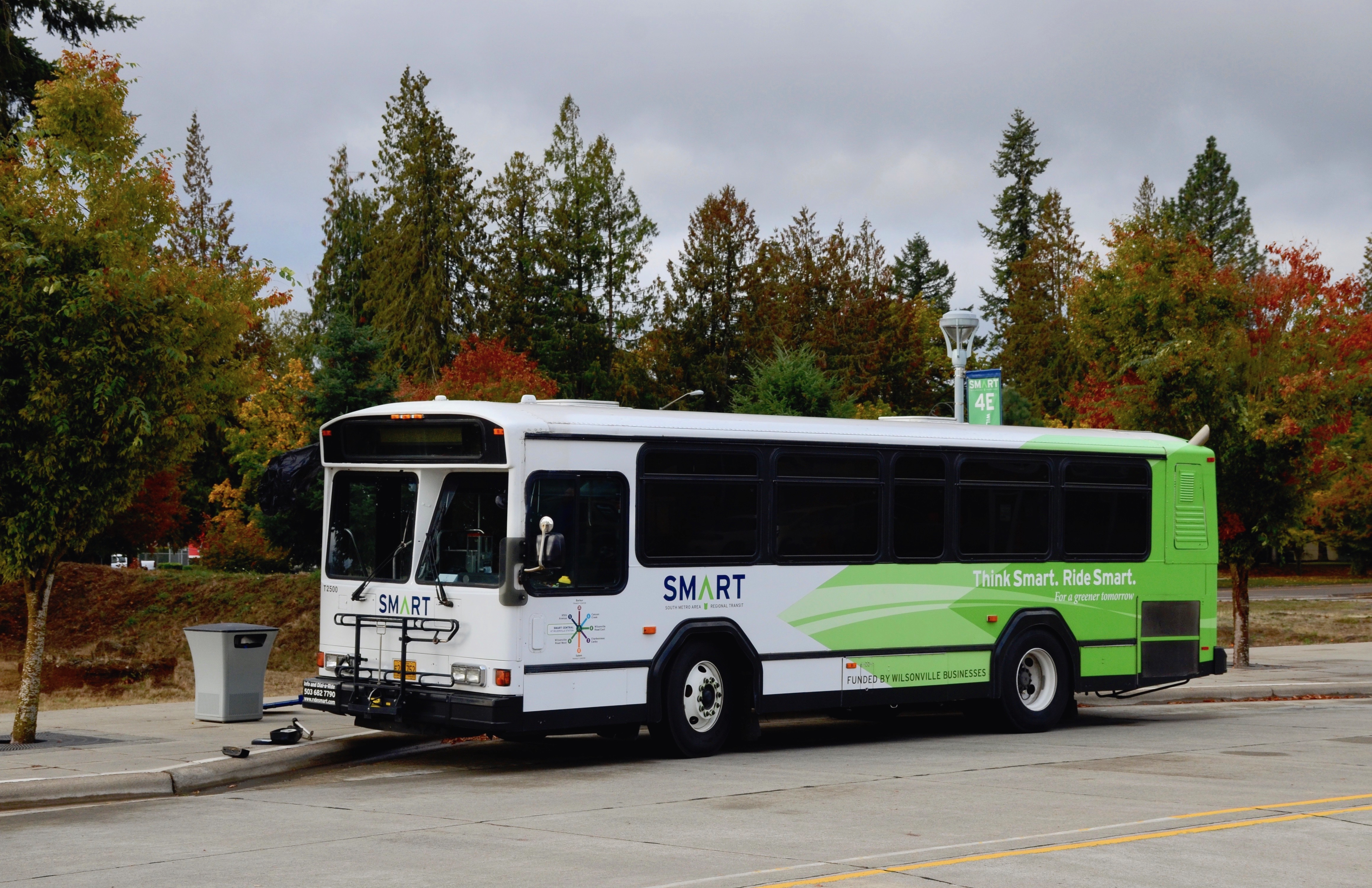
30-foot Gillig Phantom bus at SMART Central transit center in 2018

Until fall 2005, no fares were charged for any SMART routes. In 2009, TriMet's Westside Express Service (WES) commuter rail line began connecting with SMART buses at Wilsonville Station. SMART opened a new bus transit center next to the rail station, named SMART Central, that January. A minor change to SMART's name was made around the beginning of 2009, when "Rapid" was changed to "Regional", making the full name South Metro Area Regional Transit but leaving the acronym unaffected. Around the same time, a fleet wide color scheme change was made to reflect the new SMART logo and acronym, and to promote the new transit center and WES Commuter Rail.

On August 5, 2013, SMART began operating route 8X, an express route connecting the Wilsonville Transit Center with TriMet's Beaverton Transit Center via Interstate 5 and Highway 217. Because the WES commuter rail service connects the same two points, route 8X only had one trip per day in each direction (from Wilsonville at 5:20 a.m. and from Beaverton at 10:05 p.m.), and was intended to provide service at times when WES did not operate. The route was discontinued in 2016.

== Current services ==
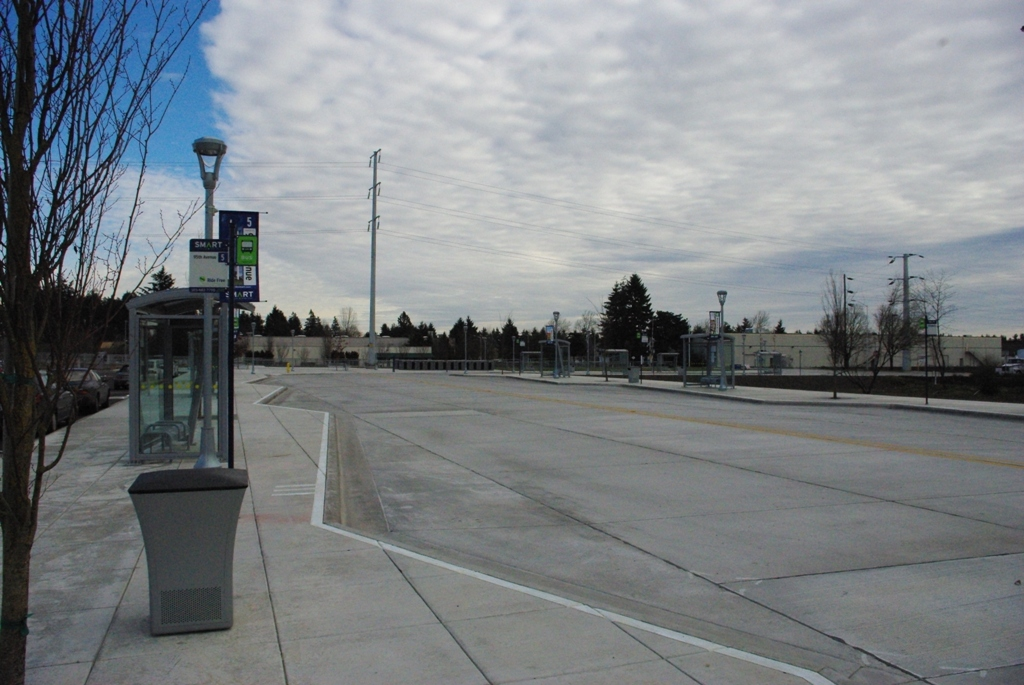
SMART Central at Wilsonville Station

SMART has five routes that serve only Wilsonville, going east-west and north-south. However, it is noteworthy that five other express routes (delineated with the suffix 'X') go well beyond the city limits (and the entities who pay for the service). Route 1X goes south on I-5 all the way to Salem, where riders can transfer to Salem-Keizer Transit (Cherriots) and operations are shared with Cherriots; the 2X heads North to Tualatin where riders can connect to TriMet; and Route 3X goes southeast to the city of Canby, connecting with Canby Area Transit. Routes 4, 5, 6, and 7 only serve Wilsonville, with Route 5 connecting to TriMet Route 96 at Commerce Circle at the northern end of the city. Route 10X runs east from Wilsonville along I-205 to Clackamas Town Center, with stops in Stafford, Willamette, and Oregon City and connections to TriMet. Route 12X runs from Wilsonville south to Woodburn, where riders can connect to Cherriots, Canby Area Transit, and Woodburn Transit.

As of June 21, 2018, a Shopper Shuttle began to help seniors & people with disabilities go shopping from Charbonneau and Villebois. This shuttle was merged with Route 7 in August 2026.

All of SMART's routes serve the transit center SMART Central, with timed connections between routes. The system has a total of 36 vehicles in its fleet as of December 2023, including buses, vans, and a trolley-replica bus.

With transfers, it is possible to use public transit to travel between Portland and Salem. Using SMART is cheaper than taking direct (and faster) Greyhound or Amtrak service.

On September 23, 2019, as part of other service improvements, the 2X route, which previously ran all the way North on I-5 to the Barbur Transit Center in Portland, was cut back to only go as far as the Tualatin Park & Ride. However, the line was also made free.

As of May 20, 2025 SMART has 4 electric buses. Three Proterra buses and an all electric trolley. SMART also is the first transit service in Oregon to operate their buses on the shoulder of I-5 for their 2x bus service to Tualatin. The current fixed-route lines are:

- Route 1X - Salem
- Route 2X - Tualatin Park & Ride
- Route 3X - Canby
- Route 4 - Wilsonville Rd
- Route 5 - 95th Ave
- Route 6 - Argyle Square
- Route 7 - Villebois
- Route 10X - Clackamas
- Route 12X - Woodburn
