= Oregon City Transit Center =

TriMet transit center in Oregon City, Oregon, U.S.

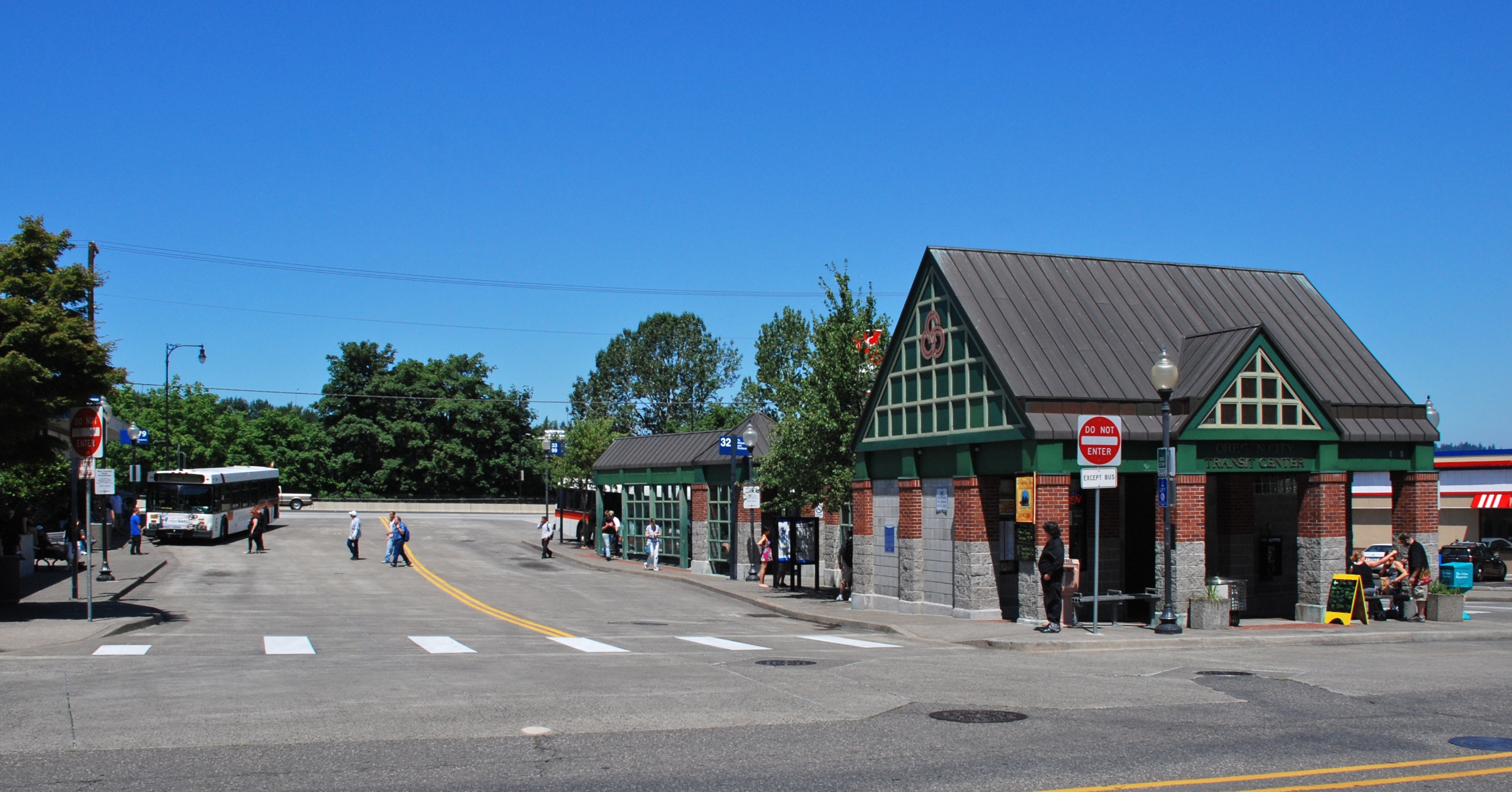
- From the south-southeast in 2011

General information
- Location: 1035 Main Street
- Coordinates: 45°21′36.3″N 122°36′15.6″W
- System: Bus transit center
- Owner: TriMet

Construction
- Accessible: Accessible to people with mobility devices

History
- Opened: 1991
Location

The Oregon City Transit Center is a TriMet transit center located at McLoughlin Blvd. and 11th Street in Oregon City, Oregon. The northwest end of the center is at McLoughlin Blvd. and the southeast end is at Main Street, while Moss Street and 11th Street run through the center and are restricted to buses only. It has bus stops on both sides of Moss Street and originally also had stops on both sides of 11th Street, but the westbound stop on 11th was removed in fall 2008.

== History ==
TriMet first proposed a transit center for Oregon City in 1981. After dropping the site it had initially chosen, TriMet in 1985 chose the site that ultimately was used for the facility. The project was approved by Oregon City's planning commission in 1989 for construction to begin in summer 1989. The transit center opened in February 1991.

== TriMet bus lines ==
From the east when newly opened, in 1991

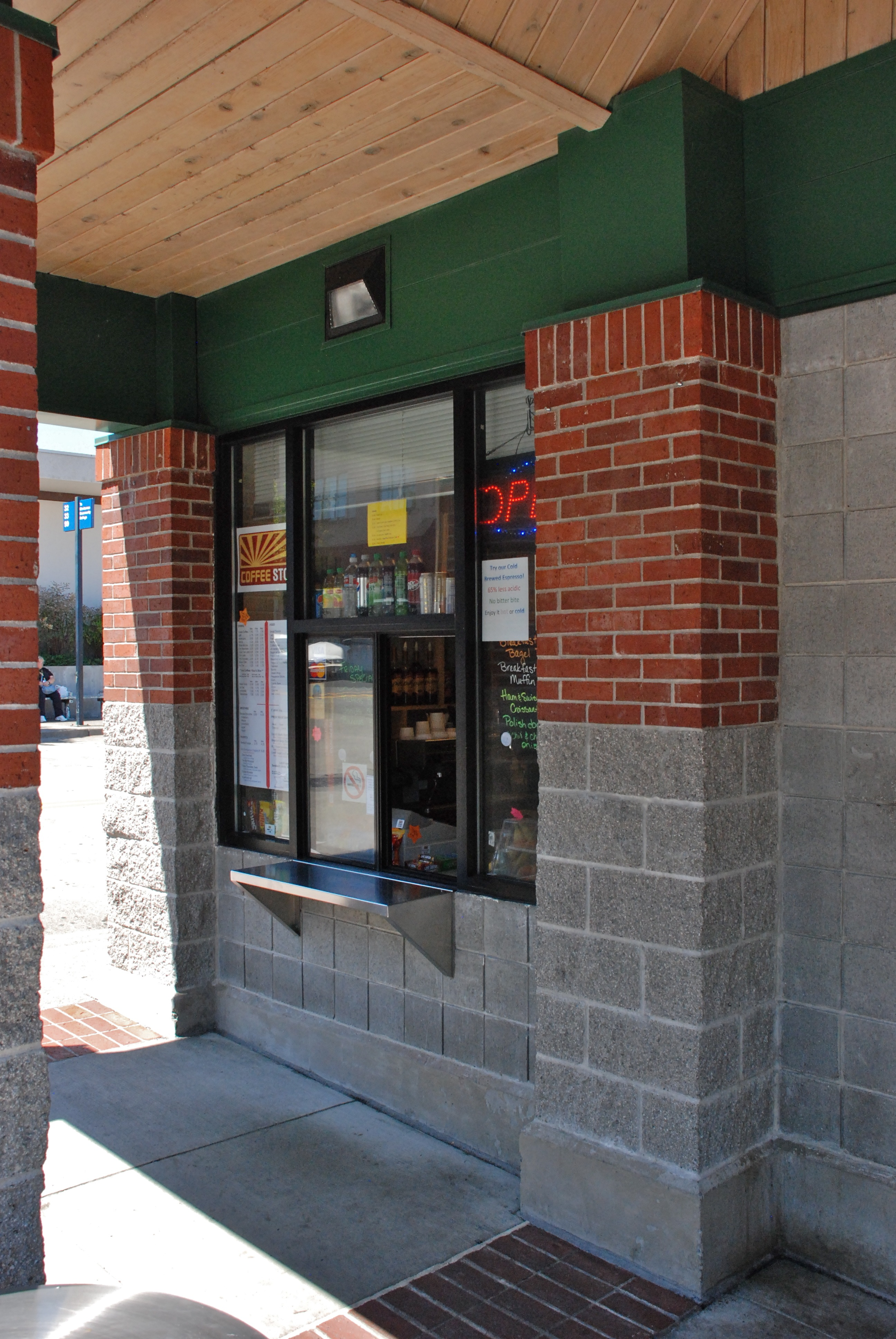
The "Coffee Stop" concession stand at the TC

The following bus routes serve the transit center as of September 2026:

- 31-Webster/Beavercreek
- 33-McLoughlin/King Rd
- 34-Oatfield/River Rd
- 35-Macadam/Greeley
- 79-Clackamas/Oregon City

Discontinued 8/23/24

- 99-Macadam/McLoughlin (express route)
- 154-Willamette/Clackamas Heights

Discontinued 8/23/26

- 32-Oatfield
- 76-Hall/Greenburg (hourly extension from Meridian Park Hospital)

== Other bus connections ==
The center is also served by:

- Canby Area Transit (CAT)
- Clackamas County Shuttle (ClackCo)
  - https://www.clackamas.us/h3s/connects-shuttle

== See also ==
- List of TriMet transit centers
