= Lake Oswego Transit Center =

TriMet transit center in Lake Oswego, Oregon, U.S.

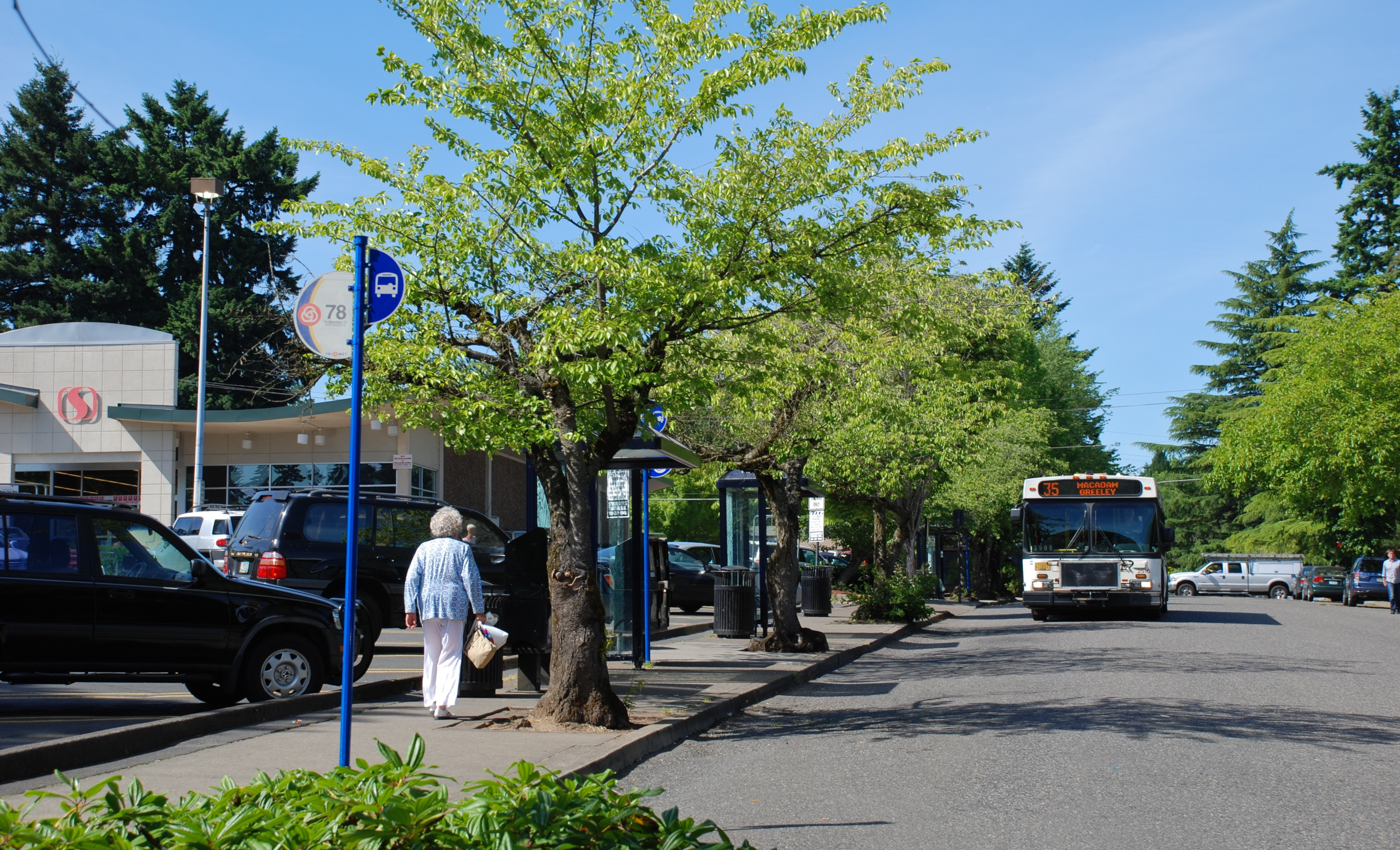
- Lake Oswego Transit Center in 2013

General information
- Location: 4th Street and A Avenue; Lake Oswego, Oregon
- Coordinates: 45.42029°N 122.668°W
- System: Bus transit center
- Owner: TriMet

Construction
- Accessible: Accessible to people with mobility devices
Location

The Lake Oswego Transit Center is a transit center operated by TriMet, at 4th Street and A Avenue in Lake Oswego, Oregon.

The following bus routes serve the transit center:

- 35 – Macadam/Greeley
- 78 – Denney/Kerr Parkway

Discontinued 8/23/26

- 37 – Lake Grove
- 153 – Stafford/Salamo

In 2002, an overhaul was planned due to the proliferation of pedestrian obstacles. At that time, the four bus lines serving the center picked up 593 passengers and dropped off 505 on an average weekday.

In the 2000s, low ridership for two of the four bus lines then serving the transit center (the 36 and 37, connecting Lake Oswego with Tualatin) was a concern for TriMet.

== See also ==
- List of TriMet transit centers
- Willamette Shore Trolley, a nearby rail corridor that has been considered for extension of light rail or streetcar service from Portland to Lake Oswego
