= Lexington Transit Center =

General information
- Location: 220 East Vine St. Lexington, Kentucky; USA
- Coordinates: 38.04445°N 84.49745°W
- Owner: Transit Authority of Lexington-Fayette

Construction
- Accessible: yes

Other information
- Website: lextran.com

History
- Opened: 1990
Location

The Lexington Transit Center is a two-story public transportation facility utilized by Lextran and other regional transit services with a five-story underground parking garage along East Vine Street and East High Street east of South Limestone in Lexington, Kentucky. It features twelve bus stalls on E. Vine Street, four bus capacity on E. High Street, two indoor waiting rooms with restrooms and vending, and three clerk booths for ticket sales and customer service, with buses running every 35 minutes for much of the day. Completion of the transit center occurred in 1990 and was completed in conjunction with the Harrison Avenue (now Martin Luther King Drive) viaduct reconstruction.

== History ==
The original plans for the Lexington Transit Center included a large apartment complex that would front both sides of Harrison Street. The One Eleven apartment project was scheduled to begin in November 1987 with preliminary ground work, with actual construction beginning in the spring of 1988. The developers of the project included Warren W. Rosenthal, chairman of Jerrico Inc., Hugh Bennett of Bennett Architects Inc. and real estate developer Bill Combs. The site was the former home of the Charlie Sturgill car dealership.

The original proposal called for 320 apartments with 425 parking spaces at 24 floors with a cost of $42 million. The project, initially proposed in February 1984, was never constructed after the developers from First Lexington Company failed to obtain a federal grant and private financing needed to complete the project. It was originally agreed that the Urban County Council would apply for a $1.9 million federal grant and authorize $21.7 million in housing bonds, with the city contributing $494,000 in local matching funds.

In 1985, it was proposed that the project include 296 one-bedroom and two-bedroom apartments, with eight penthouses, three levels of commercial space, and 354 parking spaces. The One Eleven project was to include a "walk-through mall" between High and Vine Street, a swimming pool and health club, meeting rooms, and an outdoor garden and entertainment area. It was publicly resurrected by the developers of the project and had garnered support from the Urban County Council. Federal aid for the project had already been approved, however, and a $35 million bond was issued for multifamily housing; the First Lexington Company was contributing $2.9 million, with the Kentucky Housing Corporation providing some financing. The total cost was to be $41.2 million.

Financing troubles delayed the project once again in 1986.

Later, two apartment complexes were proposed, one for each side of Harrison Street. The estimated cost of the apartment structure complex was now $35 million and would include two separate buildings, one on the west side of Harrison Street, and the other on the east side. Each structure would have been 22 floors, with 240 one-, two-, and three-bedroom apartments in each complex. The project also consisted of a transit center with an underground parking structure that would face Vine Street. The apartments would face High Street.

On September 26, 1987, a $2.2 million federal grant was issued from the Urban Mass Transportation Administration to purchase land for the transit center and underground parking structure. The cost of the apartment-transit project had ballooned to between $47 million and $57 million.

On December 1, 1987, an agreement was reached between the local government and the developers. Then-Mayor Scotty Beasler stated that the government will purchase 2.7 acres (11,000 m^{2}) of downtown property "east and west of Harrison Avenue viaduct this week" so that a transit center and a 700-space underground parking structure could be constructed. The developers would retain air rights on the west side of the property so that a high-rise apartment structure could be constructed above the transit center in the future and also paid the government $1.5 million for a 99-year lease for 200 parking spaces in the garage if in the future they wanted to construct the apartment tower. Construction began in late-1988 on the $13 million transit center and parking structure with no immediate plans to build the high-rise.

On June 11, 2006, it was announced that a mixed-use development project, combining entertainment, retail, and residential into one structure, would be constructed; it was in the preliminary planning phases. On December 5, 2006, Trammell Crow Company of Atlanta, Georgia was chosen by the Lexington Downtown Development Authority as the primary developer of a mixed-use commercial and residential project atop the Transit Center. Trammell Crow was chosen out of four companies, three of whom were local, that had submitted proposals in 2005. Marketing and engineering studies will be conducted. The new proposal calls for two residential towers, one designed for University of Kentucky students with the other geared towards market-rate housing with some affordable housing. 25,000 sq ft (2,300 m^{2}). of retail and restaurant space is also allocated.

== Current ==
It is currently used as a parking garage and as the transit hub for LexTran. Megabus used the Transit Center when it began offering daily service to and from Lexington in 2013, but all service to Lexington had been discontinued by 2016 due to low ridership.

== Regional service ==
The following services provide connections to the Lexington Transit Center from neighboring counties:

- Bluegrass Ride (Boyle, Franklin, Jessamine, and Scott counties)
- Federated Transportation Services of the Bluegrass (Bourbon, Harrison and Nicholas counties)
- Foothills Express (Clark, Estill, Madison, Montgomery, and Powell counties)
- Mor'Trans (Rowan County)

== See also ==
- Cityscape of Lexington, Kentucky
