= Washington Square Transit Center =

TriMet transit center in Tigard, Oregon, U.S.

- Buses at the transit center in 2026

General information
- Location: 9585 SW Washington Square Rd.
- Coordinates: 45.4527°N 122.7788°W
- System: Bus transit center
- Owner: TriMet
- Platforms: Island

Construction
- Structure type: Sheltered waiting areas
- Accessible: Accessible to people with mobility devices

Other information
- Fare zone: 1994–2012: Zone 3; Since 2012: No longer applicable

History
- Opened: May 22, 1994
Location

The Washington Square Transit Center is a TriMet transit center located at the Washington Square shopping center in Tigard, Oregon, in the mall's parking lot north of J. C. Penney.

The following bus routes serve the transit center:

- 45 – Garden Home/Arnold Creek
- 56 – Scholls Ferry/Marquam Hill
- 62 – Murray Blvd.
- 76 – Hall/Greenburg
- 78 – Denney/Kerr Pkwy

== See also ==
- List of TriMet transit centers
