= Milwaukie Transit Center =

Former Oregon bus center

General information
- Location: SE Jackson Street & 21st Ave. Milwaukie, Oregon; United States
- System: Former bus transit center
- Owner: TriMet

Construction
- Accessible: yes

History
- Opened: 1981
- Closed: 2010
Location

The Milwaukie Transit Center is a former bus transit center that was located in Milwaukie, Oregon. The transit center was located on SE Jackson Street between SE Main Street and SE 21st Street, adjacent to the Milwaukie City Hall. The station opened in 1981 and was stripped of its "transit center" designation by TriMet in 2010, although the bus stops remain in use. Since 2015, the MAX Orange Line provides light rail service to downtown Milwaukie, stopping a few blocks south of the former transit center site, at the Milwaukie/Main Street MAX Station.

== Bus service ==
This former transit center was served by the following bus lines in spring 2009:

- 29-Lake/Webster Rd
- 31-Estacada (split as 30-Estacada and 31-King Road later in 2009)
- 32-Oatfield
- 33-McLoughlin
- 34-River Rd
- 70-12th Avenue
- 75-Cesar Chavez/Lombard
- 99-McLoughlin Express
- 152-Milwaukie
