= Barbur Boulevard Transit Center =

Transit center in Portland, Oregon, U.S.

- Barbur Boulevard Transit Center in 2026

General information
- Location: 9750 SW Barbur Boulevard; Portland, Oregon; USA
- Coordinates: 45°27′16″N 122°43′03″W
- System: Bus transit center
- Owner: TriMet

Construction
- Parking: 368 spaces
- Cycle facilities: Bike racks and lockers
- Accessible: Accessible to people with mobility devices

History
- Opened: 1977
Location

The Barbur Boulevard Transit Center is a TriMet transit center located at 9750 SW Barbur Boulevard, near the intersection with Capitol Highway in southwest Portland, Oregon. In the late 2010s and early 2020s, Barbur TC was proposed to be a future stop on the MAX Light Rail system as part of the Southwest Corridor MAX Project, before that project was mothballed. In 2022, a portion of the transit center's roof was torn off during a wind storm on December 27.

== Bus line connections ==
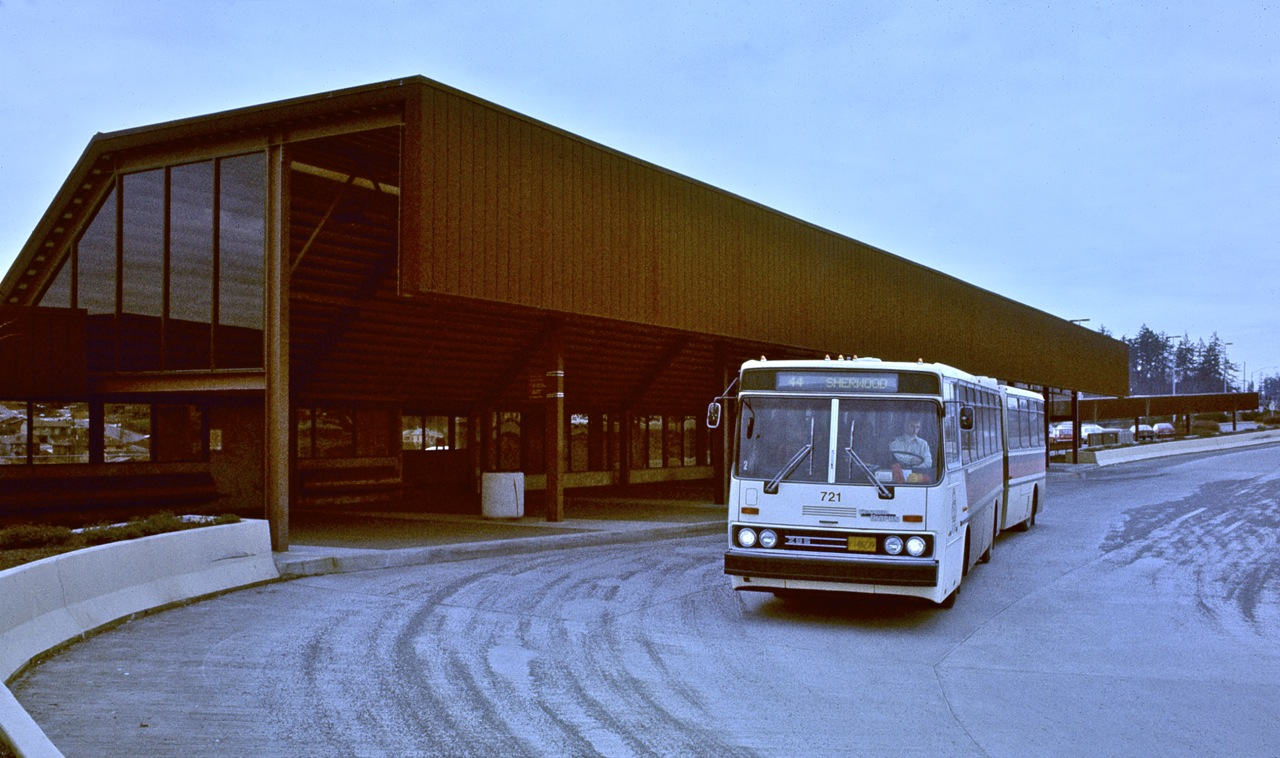
Barbur Blvd Transit Center in 1982 with an articulated bus

The following bus routes currently serve the transit center as of August 2026:

- 12 – Barbur/Sandy Boulevard
- 43 – Taylors Ferry/Marquam Hill
- 45 – Garden Home/Arnold Creek
- 96 – Boones Ferry Rd
- 97 – Tualatin-Sherwood/Kruse Way

Previously, the SMART bus 2X route served the transit center, but service was reduced to only go as far north as the Tualatin Park & Ride in September 2019.

== See also ==
- List of TriMet transit centers
