= Cherriots =

Public transit operator in Oregon, United States

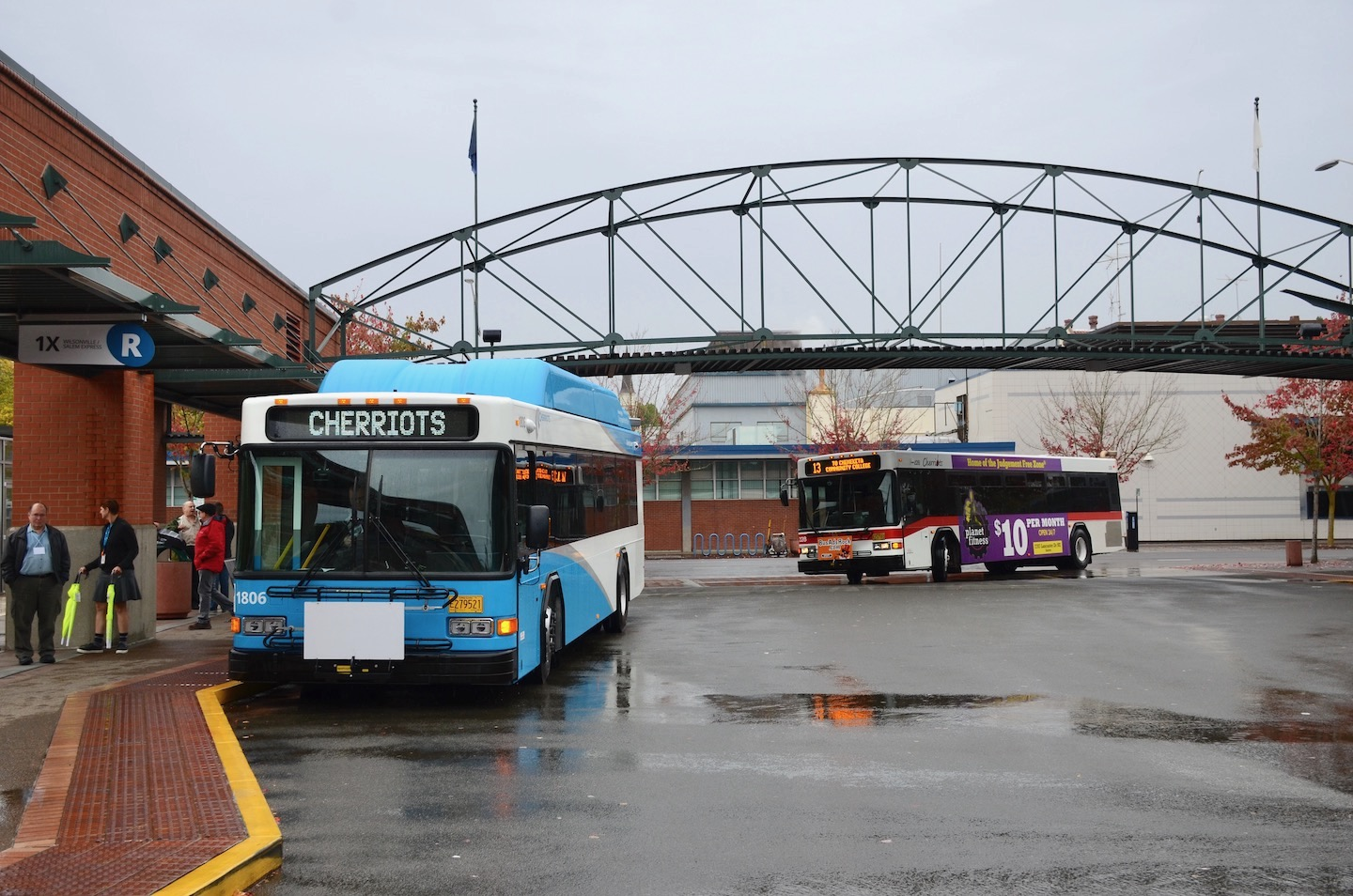
- Cherriots buses in new and old paint schemes at the Downtown Transit Center in 2018
- Founded: November 6, 1979
- Headquarters: 555 Court Street NE; Salem, Oregon, US
- Service area: Salem and Keizer, Oregon
- Service type: Bus service, paratransit
- Routes: 28
- Fleet: 64 (Cherriots); 15 (Regional Contracted); 46 (CherryLift Bus); 5 (Cherriots Shop and Ride)
- Daily ridership: 20,800 (weekdays, Q2 2026)
- Annual ridership: 3,407,600 (2025)
- Fuel type: Diesel, CNG (Natural Gas), Gasoline
- General manager: Allan Pollock
- Website: cherriots.org

Cherriots, officially the Salem Area Mass Transit District, is a public transit operator based in Salem, Oregon, United States. The agency, whose name refers to the city's nickname (The Cherry City), provides bus and paratransit service in Salem and neighboring Keizer. It was founded in 1979 as the Salem Area Mass Transit District, replacing municipal and private systems, and renamed itself to Salem-Keizer Transit in 2003. In 2025, the system had a ridership of 3,407,600, or about 20,800 per weekday as of the second quarter of 2026.

In 2016, the transit agency started a rebranding campaign to highlight its Cherriots operating name. All of its services now bear the Cherriots name. For example, a regional bus service previously called CARTS (Chemeketa Area Regional Transportation System) is now Cherriots Regional.

== History ==
=== Predecessors and formation ===
Bus service in Salem was previously operated by the private City Transit Lines, which was granted a franchise by the municipal government. The company folded in August 1958 and declared bankruptcy in January 1959. It was replaced on February 2 by Capital Transit, an independent operator founded by former City Transit drivers and mechanics. In its six years of operation, Capital Transit faced declining revenue and ridership that forced it to consider bankruptcy. On May 24, 1966, voters in Salem approved a property tax levy to purchase the Capital Transit system and operate it under the municipal government. The City of Salem took over the bus system on July 1.

Under the new financing plan, which included increased fares, the bus system's operating expenses were stabilized and became eligible for federal subsidies to purchase a new fleet. The name "Cherriots" was chosen for the bus system in September after a citywide contest, referencing the city's unofficial nickname, "The Cherry City"; the winning entry was submitted by A. Kenneth Yost, a faculty member at the Oregon College of Education and one of the contest's judges before his resignation.

The first new buses bearing the Cherriots name, colored white with red "cherry" trimming, arrived in Salem by late November and were put into service in January 1967. Cherriots buses also served Keizer and Four Corners until service was suspended by the Salem City Council in July 1976; by October, the two areas established voter-approved contracts for a private operator to run bus services that connected to the Cherriots network.

A 1968 report to the Salem government, prepared by the Mid-Willamette Valley Council of Governments and funded by a federal grant, recommended that the Cherriots network be expanded to Keizer and Four Corners as part of a regional system. The formation of a mass transit district to serve a larger system, funded using payroll taxes, was approved by the state legislature in 1969 and implemented in Portland and Eugene. While Salem and Marion County urged the creation of a transit district, Polk County's board of commissioners expressed concern over the size of the taxing area.

The formation of a mass transit district was put on the January 13, 1976, election, with a second election scheduled in March to determine the type of tax used to finance the system. Voters rejected the ballot measure by a three-to-one margin during a low-turnout election that included rural areas outside the proposed service and taxing area. A second attempt on November 8, 1977, using the same proposed payroll tax and two-phase election, was also rejected by voters. The existing Cherriots system was saved from proposed cuts after the approval of a two-year levy by Salem residents in May 1978.

A third attempt at the formation of a mass transit district was put on the November 6, 1979, ballot, during the peak of the oil crisis, and limited to within the Salem urban growth boundary. The Salem Area Transit District and its five-member board was approved by a three-to-one margin, with wide support across the voting area. The transit district's $2.35 million financing plan, using a local property tax, was rejected in May 1980 by a margin of 64 votes. The city-run Cherriots system was renewed by a one-year levy, funded by a smaller property tax within Salem, that was approved by voters in June. A trio of tax levies were put on the February 17, 1981, ballot: one to fund the operation of a consolidated bus system for one year, another for night bus service, and a final levy for fleet replacements and the construction of bus shelters. The operations levy was passed by voters, while the remaining pair were rejected. The Salem Area Transit District began funding bus service within Salem on July 1, 1981, under a contract with the municipal government's Cherriots system, and expanded to outlying suburbs on September 1.

=== Operational history ===
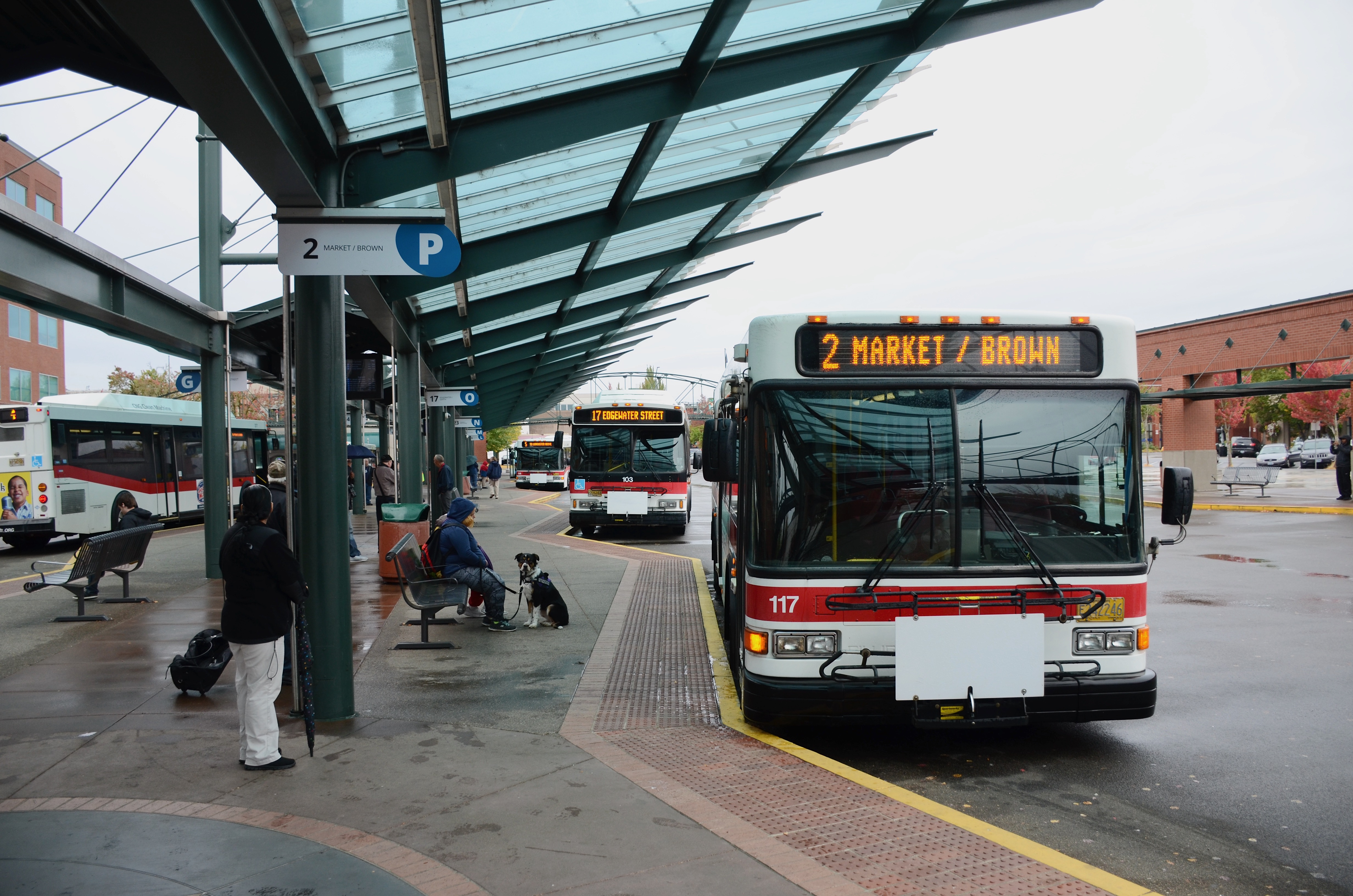
Buses laying over at the Downtown Transit Center, at Courthouse Square, in 2018

The approval of a $2.23 million tax levy in June 1982 allowed the Salem Area Transit District to take over operations of the Cherriots system on July 1, 1982. The system was funded by one- and two-year levies passed by voters in 1983 and 1985, until the approval of a permanent tax base on May 20, 1986. The five-member transit board was expanded to seven seats, all elected at-large, effective July 1, 1987. The current headquarters and operating base for Cherriots, located on Del Webb Avenue in Salem, was dedicated in April 1989 by Senator Mark Hatfield and Governor Neil Goldschmidt.

The statewide passage of Measure 5 limited property tax revenue used to fund bus services and was paired with declining matching revenues from the state. Cherriots maintained its level of service by using capital reserve funds to fund daily operations, while planning for potential cuts to service. The state legislature passed a two-year rollback of the state's cap on matching funds from the transit payroll tax in 1993, allowing Cherriots to avoid service cuts while presenting a funding plan to voters. Two attempts at establishing a larger funding base for Cherriots service were rejected by voters in 1993 and 1994, leading to the discontinuation of free services and increased fares. On May 21, 1996, voters in the transit district approved an increased property tax base to fund expanded Cherriots service, but statewide property tax caps forced the planned expansion to be rolled back. On October 2, 2000, the R. G. Andersen-Wyckoff Transit Mall at Courthouse Square in downtown Salem opened, replacing earlier downtown transit centers and consolidating several Cherriots offices into one complex. In 2003, the agency changed its name to Salem-Keizer Transit to include the city of Keizer; "Cherriots" was retained as a brand name.

Salem-Keizer Transit, along with the City of Salem and consultants Nelson\Nygaard, began studying the feasibility of a modern streetcar system for downtown Salem in 2003. The feasibility study, published in 2005, found that a three-to-four-mile (4.8 to 6.4 km) streetcar line would cost up to $61 million to construct. The proposal was ultimately abandoned due to its cost and lack of funding options.

In 2016, it was decided to phase-out the name Salem–Keizer Transit and revert to using the name Cherriots for operations and public information, while Salem Area Mass Transit District remained the agency's formal legal name.

=== Budget and service cuts ===
In 2009, Cherriots routes underwent major changes due to funding limitations. Service hours were reduced and Saturday service was eliminated. The removal of Saturday service left much of the population without weekend transport; it is a serious problem for many citizens. At the same time, Cherriots redesigned many of its routes to provide better service within funding levels.

In 2015, Cherriots started a "Moving Forward" plan which made new routes, including consolidations to achieve frequent service.

The passage of Oregon House Bill 2017, which provides state funds for transit districts across Oregon, could restore services lost to budget cuts in 2008 and 2009. HB 2017 could bring $5 million to $6 million per year to support transit in the Salem-Keizer area, as well as some regional services to smaller cities in Marion and Polk counties. In August 2017, Oregon Gov. Kate Brown signed HB 2017. But because of state administrative requirements for dispersing HB 2017 funds, Cherriots is did not receive the additional state money until January 2019. In September 2019, thanks to HB 2017 funding, Cherriots restored Saturday bus service and added bus routes that operate later in the evening. For the first time ever in Cherriots' 40 year history, Sunday will have bus service starting in May 2020.

== Services ==
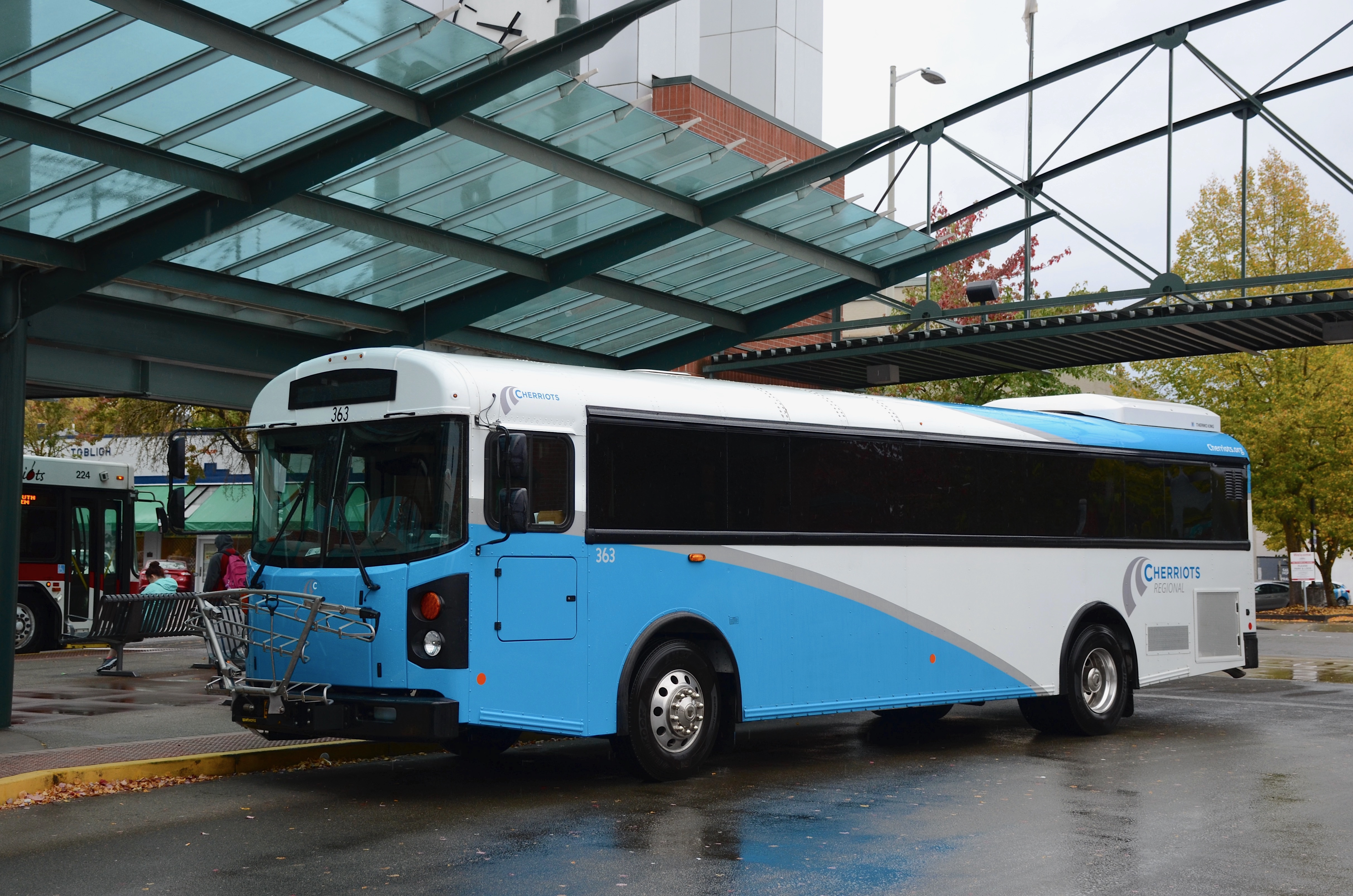
A 2018-built bus in Cherriots Regional service to Woodburn

Cherriots operates 20 local bus routes in Salem and Keizer, as well as six routes under the Cherriots Regional brand serving outlying areas in Marion and Polk counties. Buses typically run 6 am-9 pm, Monday-Sunday, at 15-minute, 30-minute, or hourly frequencies. Cherriots added Sunday service as part of their rebranding on September 5, 2021. Holiday service is also available, operating on Saturday or Sunday service levels. The system's main hub is the Downtown Transit Center at Courthouse Square in Salem, located a few blocks from the Oregon State Capitol building. The facility was first opened in 2000 and remodeled in 2014. The transit center is also served by inter-county express service to Wilsonville, operated jointly by Cherriots and SMART.

The agency also operates regional bus services under the Cherriots Regional brand, serving Woodburn, Dallas, Stayton, and Gates. Paratransit service is run as Cherriots LIFT and covers areas within 3/4 mile (1.2 km) of a fixed Cherriots route. Adult bus fares on regular Cherriots routes are set at $1.60 for one-way trips and $3.25 for day passes. In 2017, Cherriots and its regional services carried a combined total of 3.1 million passengers.

== Governance ==
The Cherriots Board of Directors makes policy and administration decisions for the transit district. The Board establishes priorities, evaluates the performance of the transit system, and approves budgets. The Board also works with community members to improve bus service and address transit-related issues. Board members are required to live in the subdistrict they represent. They were formerly elected, but with the enactment of 2018's Senate Bill 1536 in July 2019, they are appointed by the governor.

The following are the transit district board members as of November 2022:

School District Zone	Board Member Name
Subdistrict 1	Joaquín M. Lara Midkiff
Subdistrict 2	Ramiro Navarro
Subdistrict 3	Sadie Carney
Subdistrict 4	Maria Hinojos Pressey
Subdistrict 5	Ian Davidson
Subdistrict 6	Sara Duncan
Subdistrict 7	Bill Holmstrom

== Fleet ==
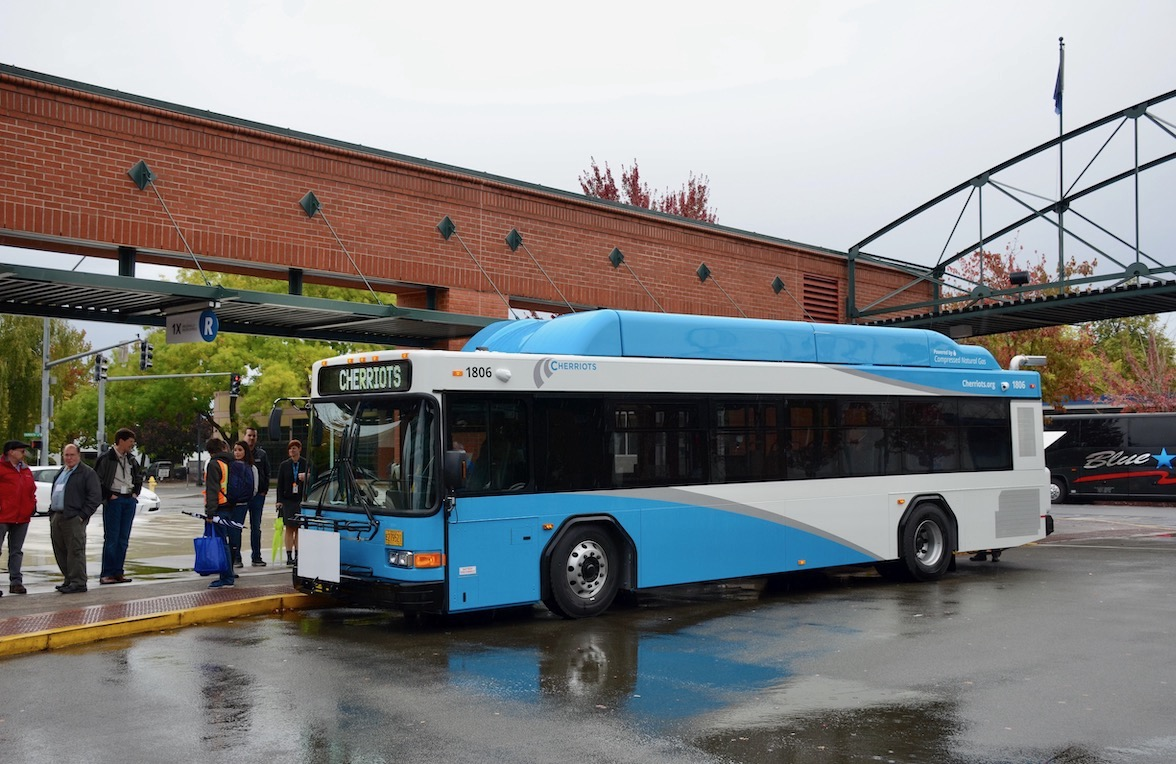
A 2018-built, 35-foot, low-floor Gillig CNG bus wearing the new paint scheme Cherriots introduced in that year

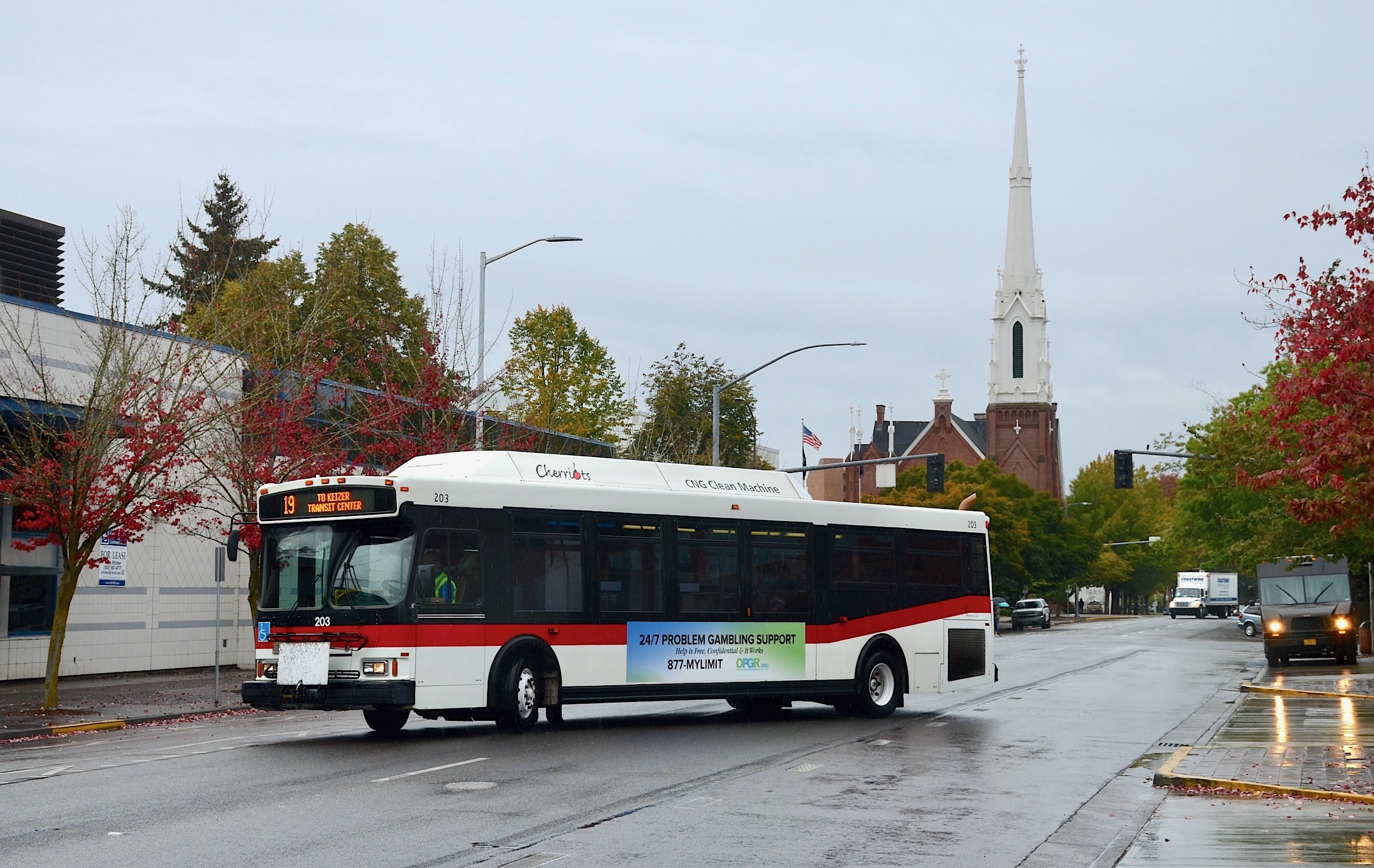
Bus 203 is a 40-foot Orion VII low-floor CNG bus built in 2002.

Cherriots maintains a fleet of 64 buses for its regular services, alongside 46 LIFT vehicles and 12 Regional buses. Regular Cherriots routes use buses that are 35 to 40 feet (11 to 12 m) in length and are powered by compressed natural gas or biodiesel; the largest buses have a maximum capacity of 38 seated and 20 standing passengers. Cherriots Regional buses range from gasoline-powered minibuses to standard diesel buses.
