= Oregon House Bills 2025 and 3991 =

Failed Oregon transportation bill

Oregon House Bill 2025 (HB2025) and Oregon House Bill 3991 (HB3991) were two bills in the U.S. state of Oregon that would have raised $14.5 billion of transportation funding by, among other things, increasing the state fuel tax, implementing a road tax for electric vehicles and delivery fleets, increasing the state payroll tax, and implementing a vehicle sales tax.

Oregon House Bill 2025 was introduced in the Oregon Legislative Assembly on June 9, 2025, by Democratic representative Susan McLain and senator Chris Gorsek. It received significant opposition from the Republican delegation and certain key Democrats, but was supported by Governor Tina Kotek. If passed, the bill would have been the largest tax increase in Oregon history. The legislative session ended shortly after it failed, and Governor Kotek delayed upcoming layoffs and called a special session of the Oregon Legislature. This resulted in the Oregon Legislature passing Oregon House Bill 3991, a similar bill, which was signed by Kotek on November 7, 2025. Portions of the bill went into effect on December 31, 2025, but the rest are delayed awaiting a public vote after an initiative petition.

== History ==
In March 2025, Oregon public transit agencies, including TriMet, Cherriots, and Rogue Valley Transportation District, warned that they would need to cut service as much as 30% over several years if additional transportation funding was not secured. The Oregon Transit Association proposed a 0.4% increase in the Statewide Transit Tax, which is a 0.1% payroll tax that was passed in 2017.

Oregon House Bills 2025 and 3991

Oregon State Legislature
- Full name: Relating to transportation; providing for revenue raising that requires approval by a three-fifths majority.
- Introduced: June 9, 2025
- Sponsor(s): Susan McLain (H), Chris Gorsek (S)
- Governor: Tina Kotek
- Website: Bill information

Status: Not passed

=== House Bill 2025 ===
On June 9, 2025, about one month before the end of the session, Representative Susan McLain and Senator Chris Gorsek introduced House Bill 2025. The bill would generate $14.6 billion in funding for public transportation and the Oregon Department of Transportation (ODOT) over the next decade. To accomplish this, it called for an increase in the state fuel tax by $0.15 (37.5%) for four years, followed by a yearly increase based on inflation, an increase in the state transit payroll tax from 0.1% to 0.3%, a 163% increase in vehicle registration fees, the creation of a new sales tax on vehicles purchases, implementation of a road tax for electric vehicles and delivery fleets, and a raise to various DMV- and transit-related fees.

The bill received near-unanimous opposition from Republican legislators and was opposed by Democratic Senator Mark Meek and Representative Paul Evans. Opponents generally cited the increase in taxes and fees, which would have been the largest tax increase in Oregon history, as their reason for opposition. Evans wanted more oversight of funds and prioritization of the Center Street Bridge seismic retrofit project in the bill. House Republican Leader Christine Drazan released a statement stating that the bill and associated tax increases was "out of touch for everyday Oregonians" and that she would "support efforts to refer this outrageous tax package to the voters.”

The Joint Committee on Transportation Reinvestment met on June 20, 2025. Senate President Rob Wagner removed fellow Democratic Senator Mark Meek from the committee after he claimed he would not be voting for the bill. Wagner installed himself as Meek's replacement. The bill was amended to increase the state car dealer tax. The committee voted 7–5, along party lines, to send the measure to the house for a full vote, eight days before the end of the session. On June 23, 2025, during another committee meeting, bill sponsor Gorsek repeatedly intterupted Republican Representative Shelly Boshart Davis. Boshart Davis filed a formal complaint against Gorsek, who later resigned from the committee along with Senator Wagner. Minority Leader Christine Drazan released a statement criticizing Gorsek and the Oregon Republican Party called for his censure.

On June 27, 2025, Democrats acknowledged that they did not have the necessary votes to pass the bill. (In Oregon, a three-fifths vote is required to pass a new tax.) The bill was not passed by the end of the legislative session.

Oregon House Bills 2025 and 3991

Oregon State Legislature
- Full name: Relating to transportation; prescribing an effective date; and providing for revenue raising that requires approval by a three-fifths majority.
- Introduced: August 29, 2025
- Assembly voted: September 1, 2025
- Senate voted: September 29, 2025
- Signed into law: November 7, 2025
- Sponsor(s): Joint Special Session Committee on Transportation Funding
- Governor: Tina Kotek
- Website: Bill information

Status: Partly in force (Initiative petition filed to put portions of bill to public vote)

=== House Bill 3991 ===
The legislative session ended shortly after it failed, and Governor Kotek delayed upcoming layoffs and called a special session of the Oregon Legislature. The Joint Special Session Committee on Transportation Funding introduced House Bill 3991. The bill was similar to HB2025, and called for an increase in transportation funding through a $0.06 per gallon increase to the gas tax; a $42 increase to all registration fees, an additional $30 for electric vehicles and vehicles with 40 or more miles per gallon; and a $139 increase to title fees. The bill would raise $700 million per biennium. The bill also called for a phased-in mandatory road user charge program for electric and hybrid vehicles beginning July 2027 and updates to heavy truck and diesel taxes.

The bill passed the House in a 36-12 vote on September 1, 2025. Twelve legislators were absent on the day of the vote. On September 29, 2025, the bill passed the Senate in an 18-11 vote, with one absence. Kotek initially delayed signing the bill, but did so on November 7, 2025. An initiative petition by Oregon citizens was passed and large portions of the bill have been delayed pending the vote. Some portions did go into effect. Starting on December 31, 2025, there was a $30 increase in registration fees for vehicles with 40 or more miles per gallon, and beginning July 1, 2027, a new mandatory per-mile road usage charge will beginfor existing electric vehicles, followed by new EVs and hybrids/plug-in hybrids the following year.

== Impact ==
Due to failure to pass HB2025, ODOT announced that they would lay off around 500 state employees, approximately 10% of the department's workforce. ODOT also announced reduced maintenance of rest area and state park roads, reduced pothole repairs, and said that they would not be replacing road guardrails that had been damaged by wildfires. On July 22, 2025, Kotek announced that she would be delaying the layoffs.

On July 24, 2025, TriMet, the public transit agency serving the Portland area, announced major service cuts to save $159 million. The service cuts included reduced frequency, shortened MAX Light Rail lines, and eliminated bus lines. These cuts will go into effect on August 23, 2026.

== See also ==
- 2025 in Oregon
- 82nd Oregon Legislative Assembly
- 83rd Oregon Legislative Assembly
- Transportation in Oregon
