= Transportation in Portland, Oregon =

Overview of movement of goods and passengers in Portland

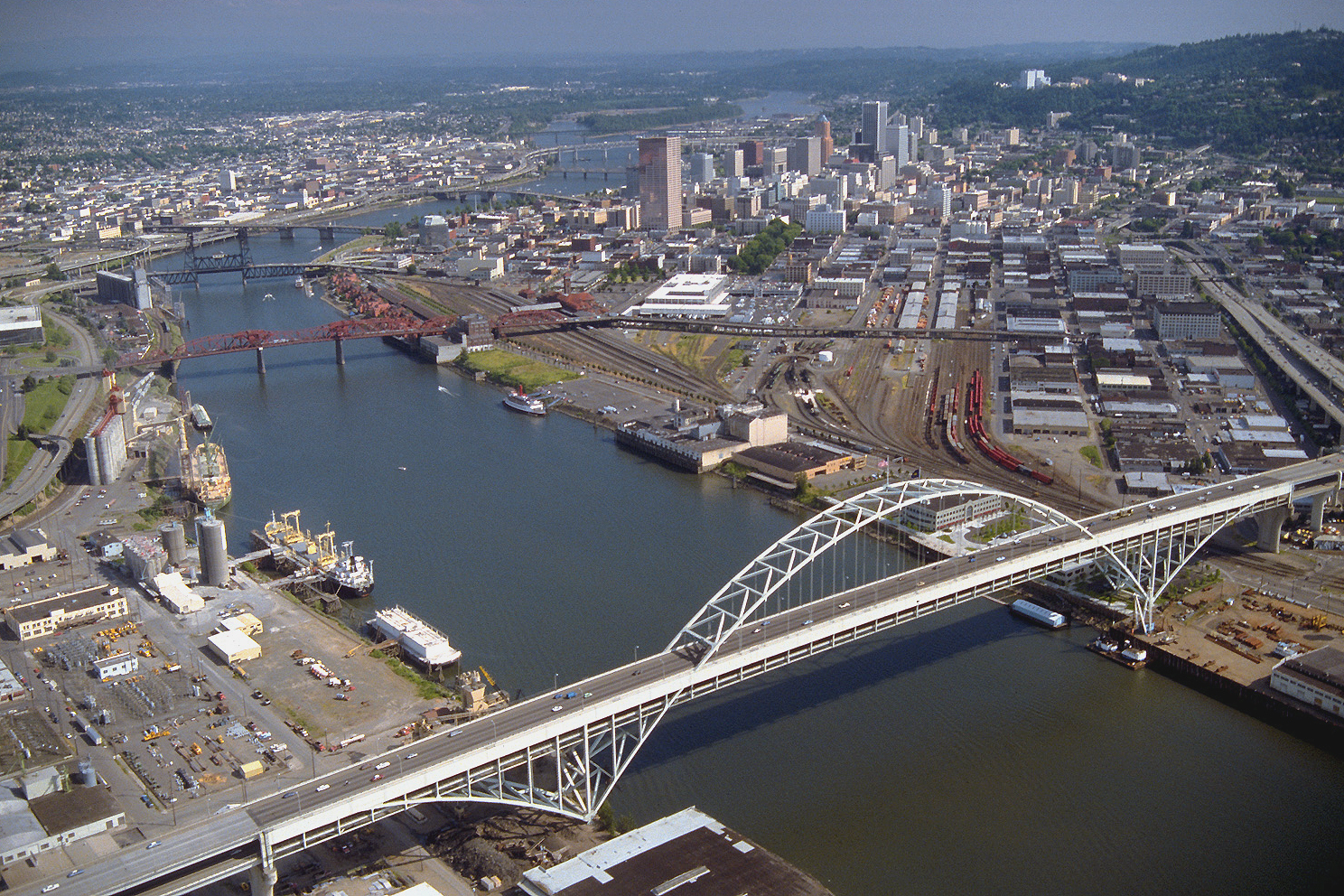
Road bridges across the Columbia and Willamette Rivers are a critical piece of Portland's transportation infrastructure.

Like transportation in the rest of the United States, the primary mode of local transportation in Portland, Oregon is the automobile. Metro, the metropolitan area's regional government, has a regional master plan in which transit-oriented development plays a major role. This approach, part of the new urbanism, promotes mixed-use and high-density development around light rail stops and transit centers, and the investment of the metropolitan area's share of federal tax dollars into multiple modes of transportation. In the United States, this focus is atypical in an era when automobile use led many areas to neglect their core cities in favor of development along interstate highways, in suburbs, and satellite cities.

Portland is "an international pioneer in transit orientated developments."

— Sayeeda Warsi, a British Conservative politician, from a 2006 episode of Newsnight

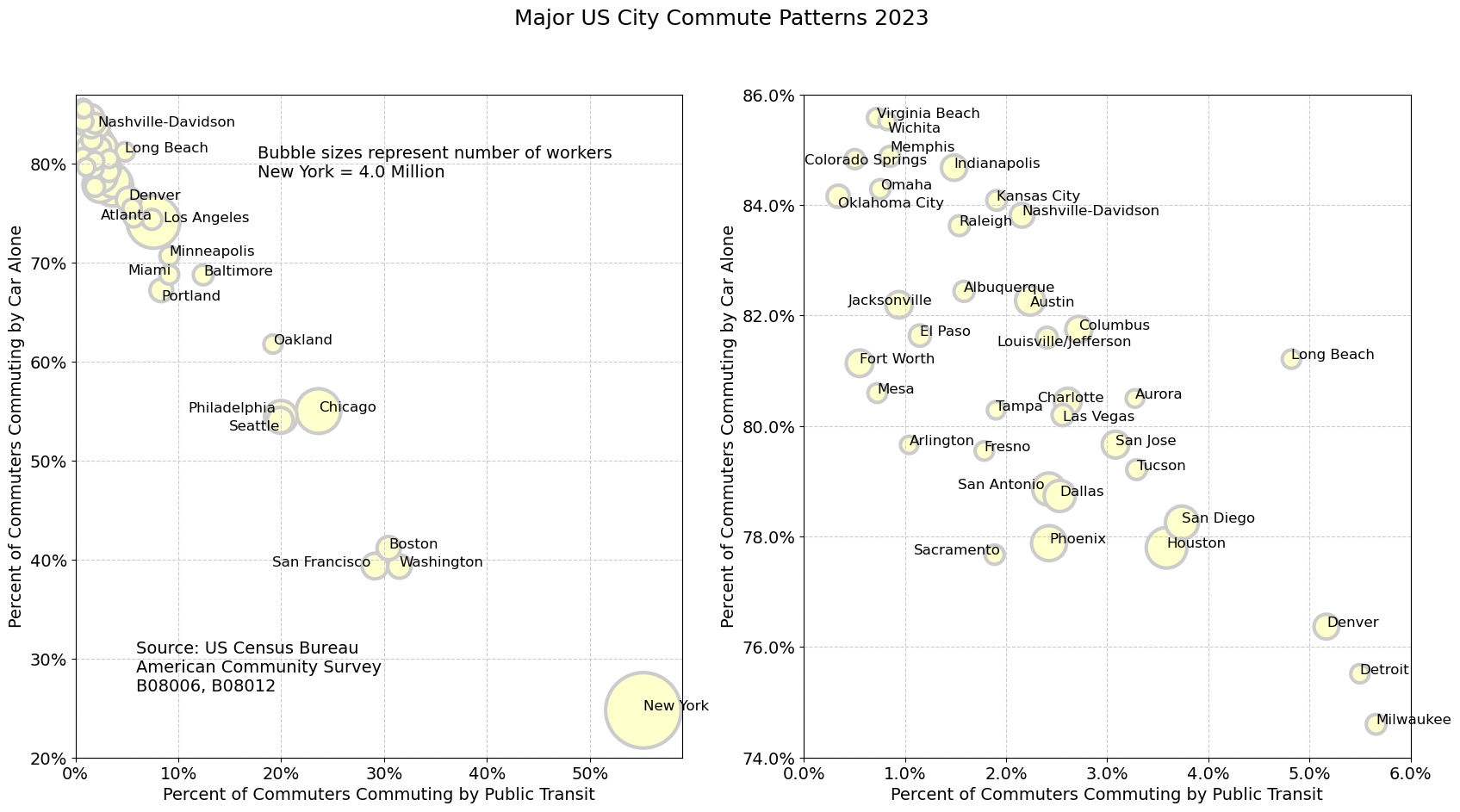
Commuting statistics for major U.S. cities in 2023.

== Mass transit ==
Portland has a public transportation system. The bus and rail system is operated by TriMet, its name reflecting the three metropolitan area counties it serves (Multnomah, Clackamas, and Washington). Portland's rate of public transit use (12.6% of commutes in 2008) is comparable to much larger cities like Los Angeles, and higher than in most similarly sized U.S. cities, but is lower than in some others, such as Baltimore and Seattle. Transit service between Portland and Vancouver, Washington, the second-largest city in the metropolitan area, is provided by C-Tran, with a small number of express routes.

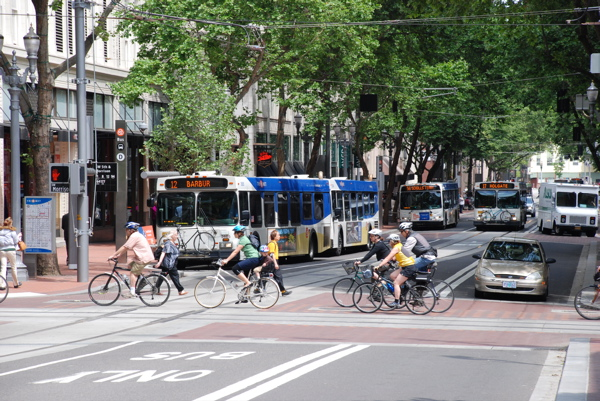
Buses and bikes in downtown Portland.

Within the downtown area (the city center) is the Portland Transit Mall, a transit-priority corridor on which buses and light rail trains from many different parts of the region converge. First opened in 1977, and for three decades served only by buses, the transit mall underwent major changes in 2009. Tracks for light rail (MAX) were added, bus stops spaced farther apart, and the left lane opened to general traffic (but with right turns prohibited). To facilitate this major renovation and rebuilding, lasting more than two years, all bus routes using the mall were diverted to other streets (mainly 3rd and 4th avenues) starting in January 2007. The transit mall reopened to buses on May 24, 2009, and operator training runs on the new light-rail tracks took place during the late spring and summer. Light rail service on the transit mall was introduced on August 30, 2009, when the MAX Yellow Line moved to the mall from its previous routing. The new MAX Green Line opened 13 days later, on September 12, and it also serves the downtown transit mall.

From 1975 to 2010, all of downtown Portland was in Fareless Square, a fare zone within which all rides on buses, light rail and streetcars were fare-free, and starting in 2001 this zone also covered a portion of the adjacent Lloyd District. In 2010, free rides became limited to light-rail and streetcar service – no longer covering bus service – and the zone was renamed the "Free Rail Zone". In September 2012, the fareless zone was discontinued entirely, due to a $12 million shortfall in TriMet's annual budget.

Ben Holladay was the first person to offer public transportation to the city of Portland when in 1872 he opened the Portland Street Railway Company, a horsecar line on First Street extending to a garage at the end of Glisan. In 1882, a second horsecar system was built for Third Street. Ferries such as the O&CRR Ferry#2 were used to cross the Willamette River before the construction of the first Steel Bridge in 1888. At that point, rail expanded into Albina and East Portland. Horsecars took passengers across the river and steam trains took them further into the suburbs, but both modes were soon replaced by electric streetcar lines, the first of which began operation on November 1, 1889, between St. Johns and Portland.

=== Buses ===
TriMet operates a fleet of 688 buses on a network of 79 bus routes. Twelve of the routes are designated "Frequent Service" bus routes, with more frequent schedules than other routes. Originally intended to have buses scheduled every 15 minutes or less all day, every day (including weekends and holidays), budget cutbacks in 2009 caused TriMet to change "Frequent Service" routes to have 15-minute-or-less wait times only during weekday peak usage times in the morning and afternoon. In August 2014, TriMet reintroduced 15-minutes-or-less wait times at all times during weekdays on Frequent Service routes, with the stated goal of reinstating weekend 15-minutes-or-less wait times on these routes.

TriMet's bus fleet is made up of 40-foot (12 m) and 30-foot (9 m) buses, built in 2000 or later, and all are low-floor buses, the last of the high-floor models having been retired in 2016. The last non-air-conditioned buses were retired in December 2015.

TriMet's bus routes also include express buses from downtown Portland to South Beaverton, Sherwood and Oregon City, and express buses from Marquam Hill to Beaverton, Tigard, Southwest Portland, and Milwaukie. TriMet also has several "cross-town" routes that do not serve downtown Portland. The bus network operates predominately in a hub-and-spoke network starting with the downtown Portland transit mall, and includes outlying transit centers in Portland's suburbs.

In addition to the fixed-route service, TriMet operates a paratransit service known as LIFT which operates 253 minibuses and 15 sedans offering door-to-door service for citizens who cannot access regular TriMet services.

=== MAX light rail ===
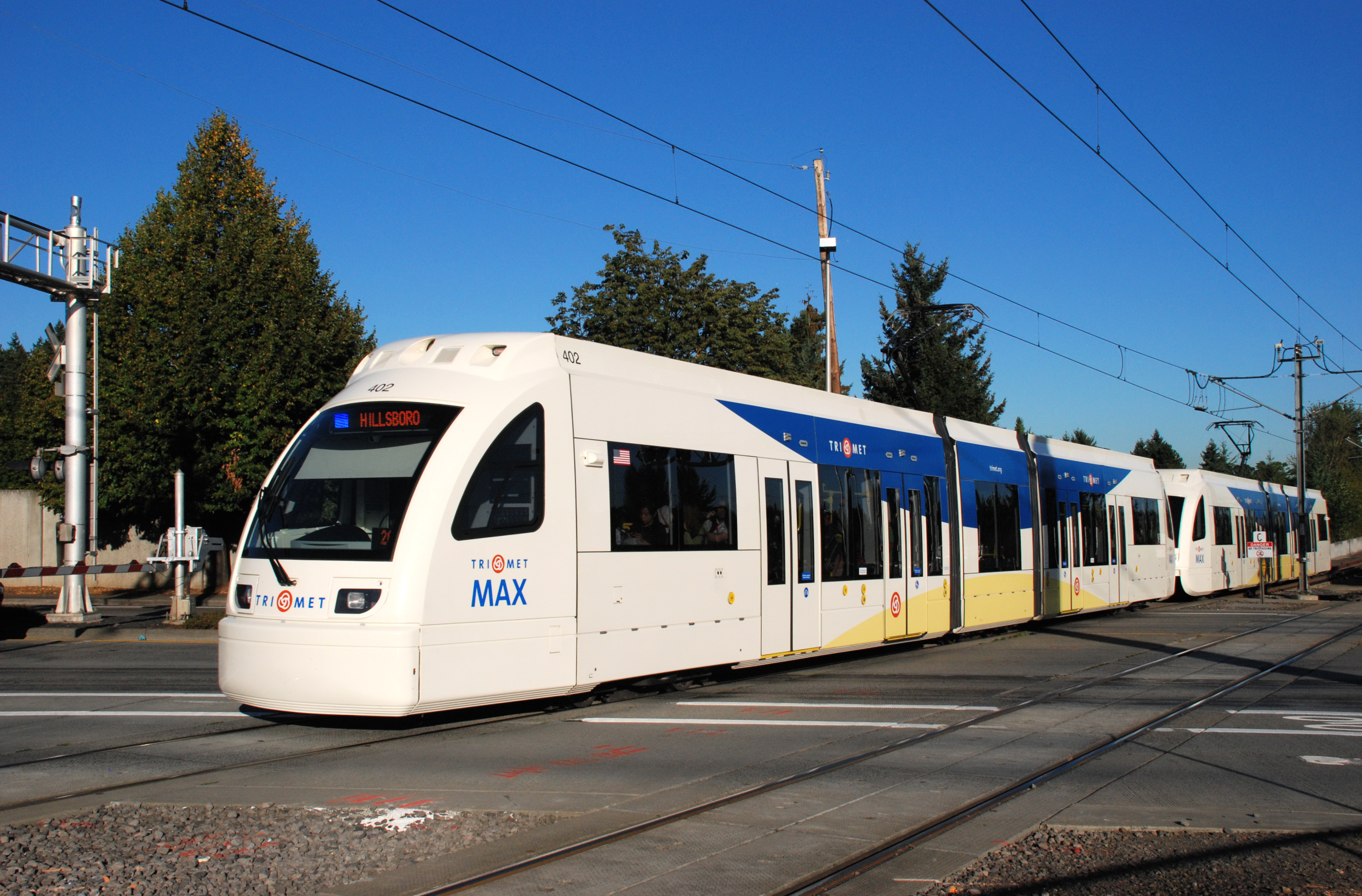
A Siemens S70 MAX train, in service on the Blue Line

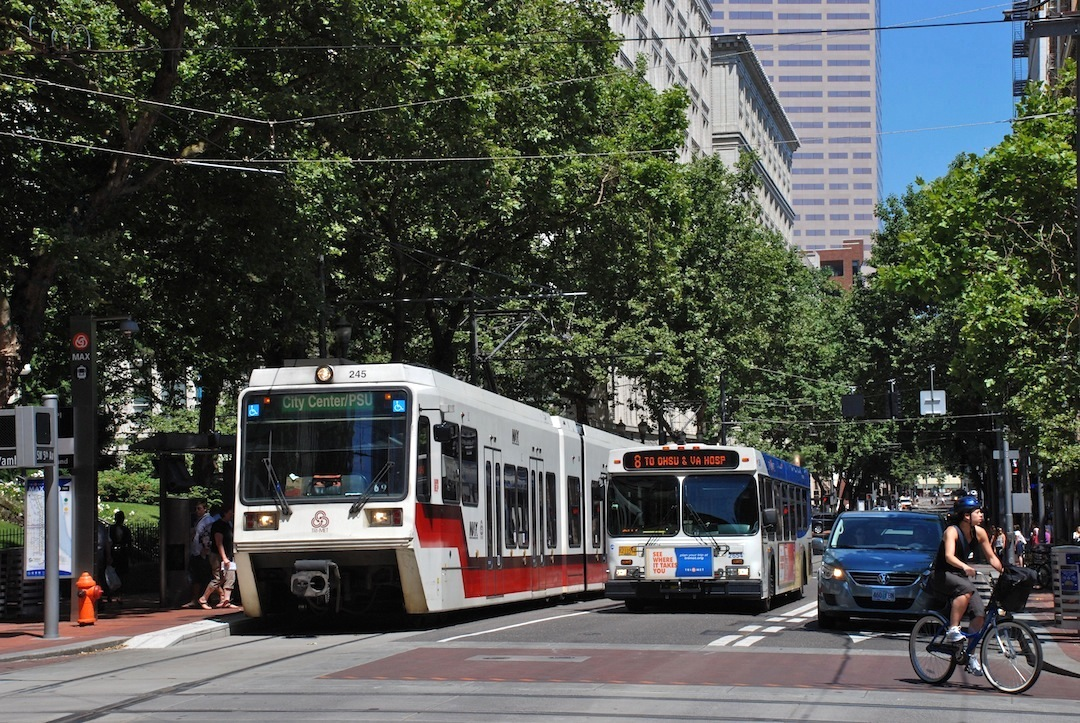
Since 2009, the Portland Transit Mall has been used by both MAX and buses.

Since September 2015, Portland's light rail system, named MAX (short for Metropolitan Area Express), consists of five color-coded lines:

- The Blue Line is a 33-mile (53 km) east-west route. It begins in Hillsboro, a western suburb, passes through Beaverton and downtown Portland, then across the Willamette River, through Northeast Portland and east to the city of Gresham. The 15-mile (24 km) line between downtown and Gresham was the first light rail line opened in Portland, in 1986. MAX lines first became designated by colors in 2000.
- The Red Line incorporates a 5.6-mile (9.0 km) north-south addition between the airport and the Gateway Transit Center near the northeast Portland neighborhood of Parkrose. From that point the line overlaps the Blue Line, running west to downtown and beyond, terminating at the Hillsboro Airport/Fairgrounds station. From its opening in 2001 until 2003, the Red Line ended in downtown Portland before its extension along Blue Line tracks to Beaverton Transit Center and subsequently farther west to Hillsboro Airport in 2024.
- The Yellow Line added 5.8 miles (9.3 km) to the system. It connects North Portland's Expo Center with downtown. This line is often referred to as "Interstate MAX" because much of it runs along Interstate Avenue, and parallel to I-5. Until 2009, the Yellow Line followed the same mostly east-west alignment through downtown Portland as used by the Blue and Red lines, traveling along Morrison Street (westbound) and Yamhill Street (eastbound) through the core of the business district. However, on August 30, 2009, the Yellow Line shifted to a new north-south alignment through downtown that had been constructed along the Portland Mall (see Green Line). In 2015, the Yellow Line became through-routed at all times with the then-new Orange Line (see below).
- The Green Line runs from Clackamas Town Center, in the Clackamas area, north along I-205 for 6.5 miles (10.5 km) to the Gateway Transit Center, where it meets the Blue and Red Lines and terminates. From its opening in 2009 until 2026, the Green Line joined the Blue and Red Lines and continued westwards to downtown Portland along the 1986-opened tracks extending to the Steel Bridge. From there—a new junction on the bridge's west deck that was built for the Green Line—the line used 1.8 miles (2.9 km) of new tracks passing Union Station and running mainly along the transit mall for the remainder of its route through downtown, sharing that routing with the Yellow Line (and since 2015 the Orange Line) and terminating at Portland State University (PSU).
- The Orange Line added 7.3 miles (11.7 km) of newly constructed line, extending from the south end of the Portland Mall to Milwaukie. The project included construction of the Tilikum Crossing, the first new bridge opened across the Willamette River in Portland in 42 years (since 1973), which is also notable for being open only to transit vehicles, pedestrians and cyclists—and not private vehicles. From the PSU area in downtown, the Orange Line follows streets and a bus-and-light-rail-only viaduct to reach the South Waterfront district. After crossing the river, the line turns southward, passing through Southeast Portland along a new median on SE 17th Avenue and then mostly along or adjacent to previously existing railroad rights-of-way to downtown Milwaukie. The terminal station is at Park Avenue, just south of downtown Milwaukie. Operationally, it is linked to the Yellow Line at all times; southbound Yellow Line trains become Orange Line trains when they depart from Rose Quarter TC, and northbound Orange Line trains become Yellow Line trains when they reach the transit mall in downtown Portland.

=== Portland Streetcar ===
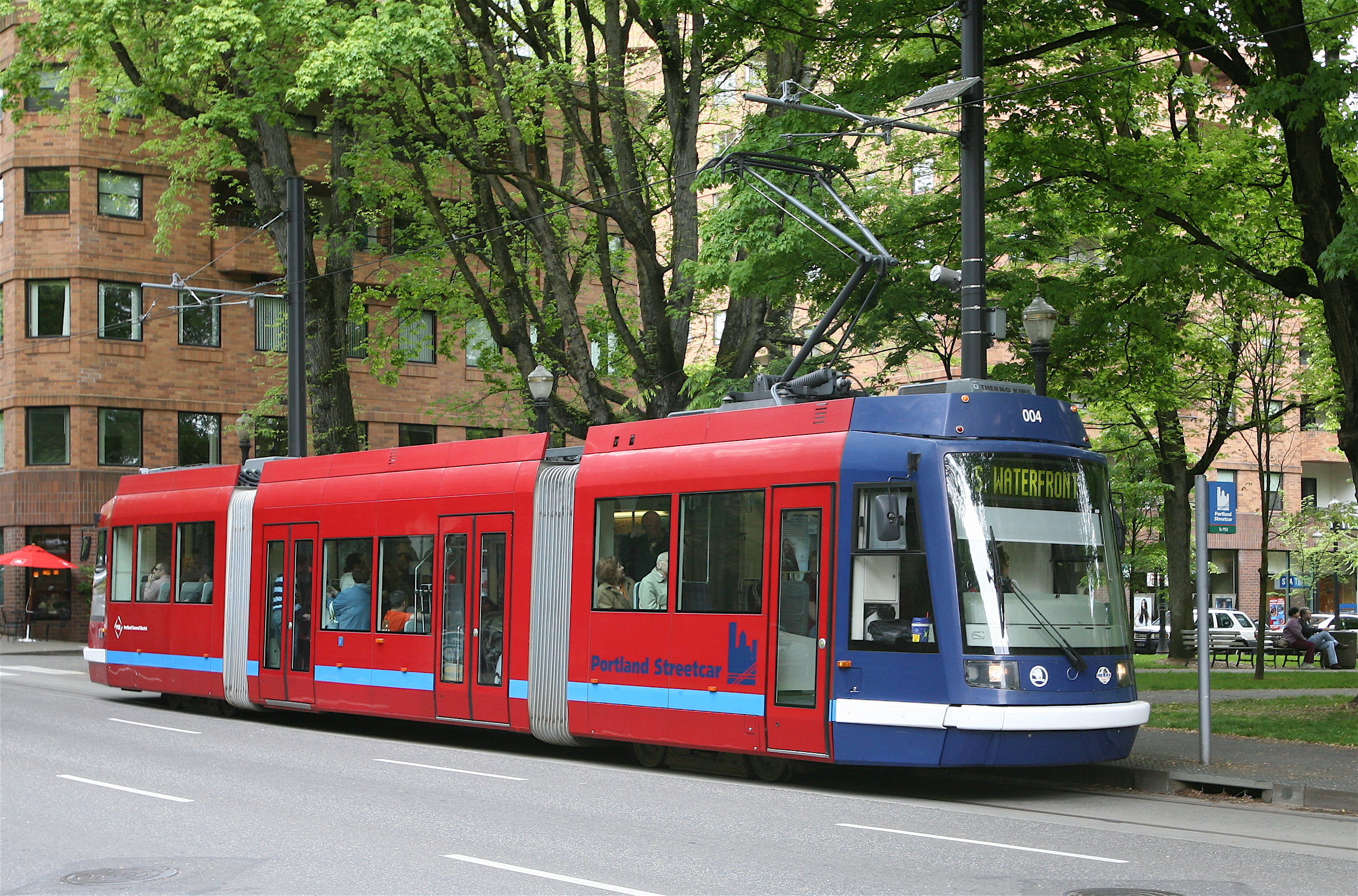
Portland Streetcar

The Portland Streetcar is a two-line streetcar system serving the central part of Portland—downtown and the areas immediately surrounding downtown. The system's first line opened in 2001 and, with later extensions, now follows a 3.9-mile (6.3 km) route from Legacy Good Samaritan Medical Center at NW 23rd Avenue through inner-Northwest and Southwest, including the Pearl District and Portland State University, to the new South Waterfront neighborhood, where it connects to the Portland Aerial Tram. In 2012, this route was given the designation North-South Line, or NS Line.

The system's second line opened in 2012 and extended service across the Willamette River to the Lloyd District and the Central Eastside. The federal share of funding for this $148-million project, a 3.3-mile (5.3 km) extension and fleet expansion, was approved in April 2009, and construction began in August 2009. Originally named the Central Loop Line, or CL Line, it was renamed the A Loop (clockwise) and B Loop (counterclockwise) in 2015, when it was extended from the eastside across the Tilikum Crossing bridge and also along the NS Line from South Waterfront to Portland State University. See Portland Streetcar (Eastside line) and Loop Service (Portland Streetcar) for more detail.

The Willamette Shore Trolley is a seasonal, volunteer-operated heritage streetcar service established in 1990 – after a 1987 trial run – for the purpose of preserving an approximately 6-mile (10 km) former Southern Pacific railroad right-of-way running south from Portland to Lake Oswego for possible future transit use. Plans to extend the Portland Streetcar along the right-of-way were mothballed in early 2012, but remain under consideration for the long term. The right-of-way was acquired by a consortium of local governmental entities in 1988 for this purpose.

An earlier streetcar began in 1871 with the introduction of eleven horse-drawn cars, which were later abandoned in 1895. The city's first electric streetcars debut in 1889 and ran over the Steel Bridge. These lines were established by private companies and later consolidated under the Portland Railway, Light and Power Company by 1906.

=== Commuter rail ===
TriMet's WES Commuter Rail connects the cities of Wilsonville, Tualatin, Tigard and Beaverton. It is one of only two suburb-to-suburb commuter rail lines in the country, along with Tri-Rail in Miami. Rather than electric railcars like those of MAX, the line uses FRA-compliant diesel multiple units running on existing Portland and Western Railroad freight tracks. The first rides open to the general public took place on Friday, January 30, 2009, and regular service began on Monday, February 2, 2009.

Amtrak also exists as a rail commuting option in the Portland area with the Amtrak Cascades providing daily service between Portland and neighboring Oregon City. While the frequency is less than that of TriMet, the 20-minute ride from Oregon City is faster, has cheaper tickets, and is arguably a more comfortable service.

See the Intercity service section below for information about the many intercity bus and train services to and from Portland from outside the metro area.

=== Portland Aerial Tram ===
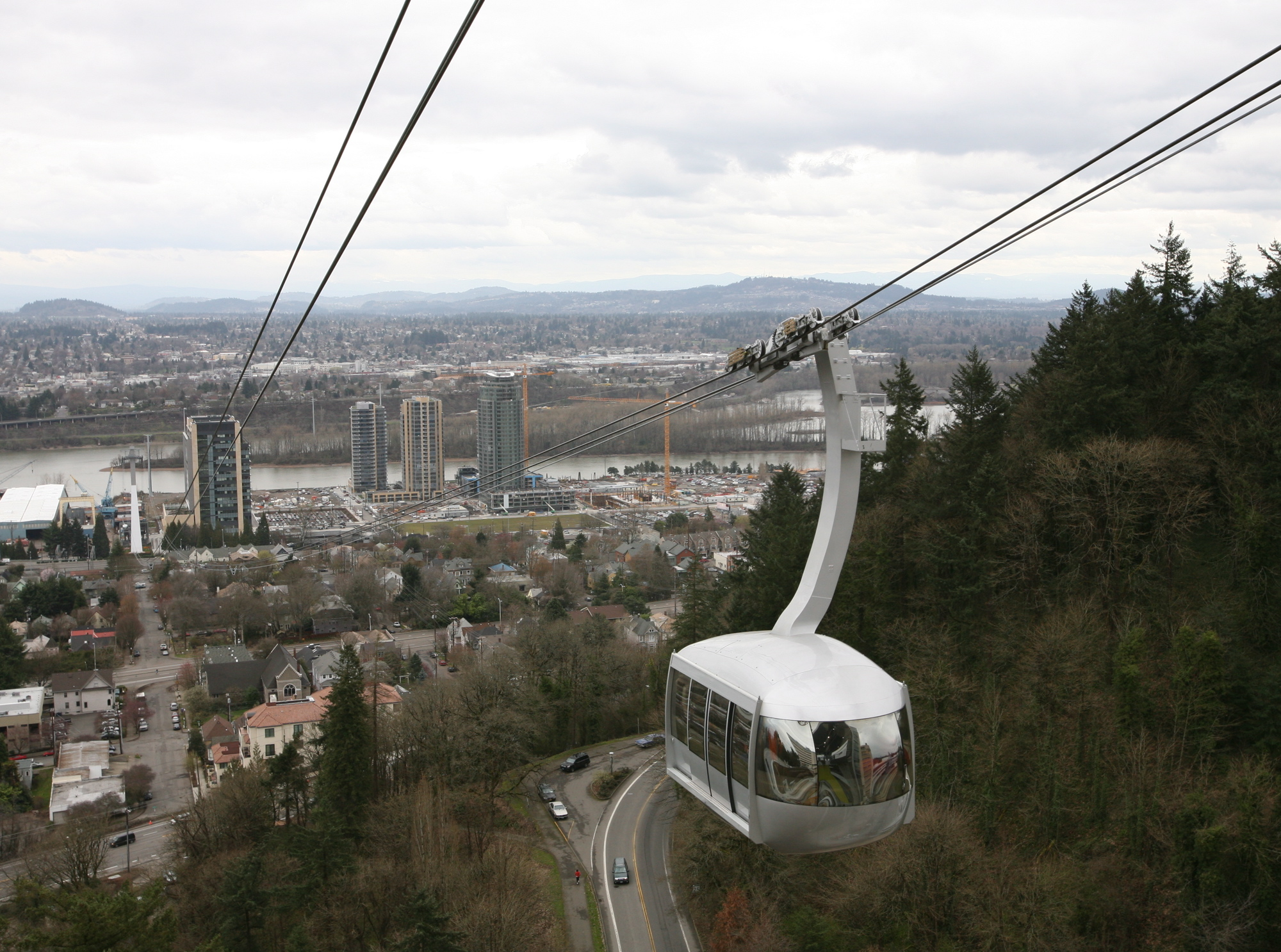
Portland Aerial Tram car descends towards the rising South Waterfront district.

The Portland Aerial Tram is an aerial cableway used to connect the South Waterfront district with Oregon Health and Science University on Marquam Hill above. The cableway is two-thirds of one mile (1 km) long and was opened to the public in January 2007.

==== Portland, OR Public Transportation Statistics ====
The average amount of time people spend commuting with public transit in Portland, OR, for example to and from work, on a weekday is 90 min. 36% of public transit riders, ride for more than 2 hours every day. The average amount of time people wait at a stop or station for public transit is 14 min, while 21% of riders wait for over 20 minutes on average every day. The average distance people usually ride in a single trip with public transit is 8.2 km, while 18% travel for over 12 km in a single direction.

== Cycling ==
Bicycle use in Portland has been growing rapidly, having nearly tripled since 2001; for example, daily bicycle traffic on four of the Willamette River bridges has increased from 2,855 before 1992 to over 16,000 in 2008, partly due to improved facilities. Approximately 8% of commuters bike to work in Portland, the highest proportion of any major U.S. city and about 10 times the national average. In July 2016, Portland introduce a bike share program known as Biketown, initially running with 1,000 bikes. The bikes were provided by Social Bicycles, and the program is operated by Motivate.

== Walking ==
According to a city video, in 1994 Portland became the first city to develop a pedestrian master plan. Blocks in the downtown area are only 200 feet (61 m) long. Many streets in the outer southwest section of the city lack sidewalks; however, this is partially made up with various off-street trails. A 2011 study by Walk Score ranked Portland the 12th most walkable of the fifty largest cities in the United States.

The Gibbs Street Pedestrian Bridge, a pedestrian and bicycle bridge over I-5 near the Portland Aerial Tram, opened in 2012.

== Electric ride-share scooters ==
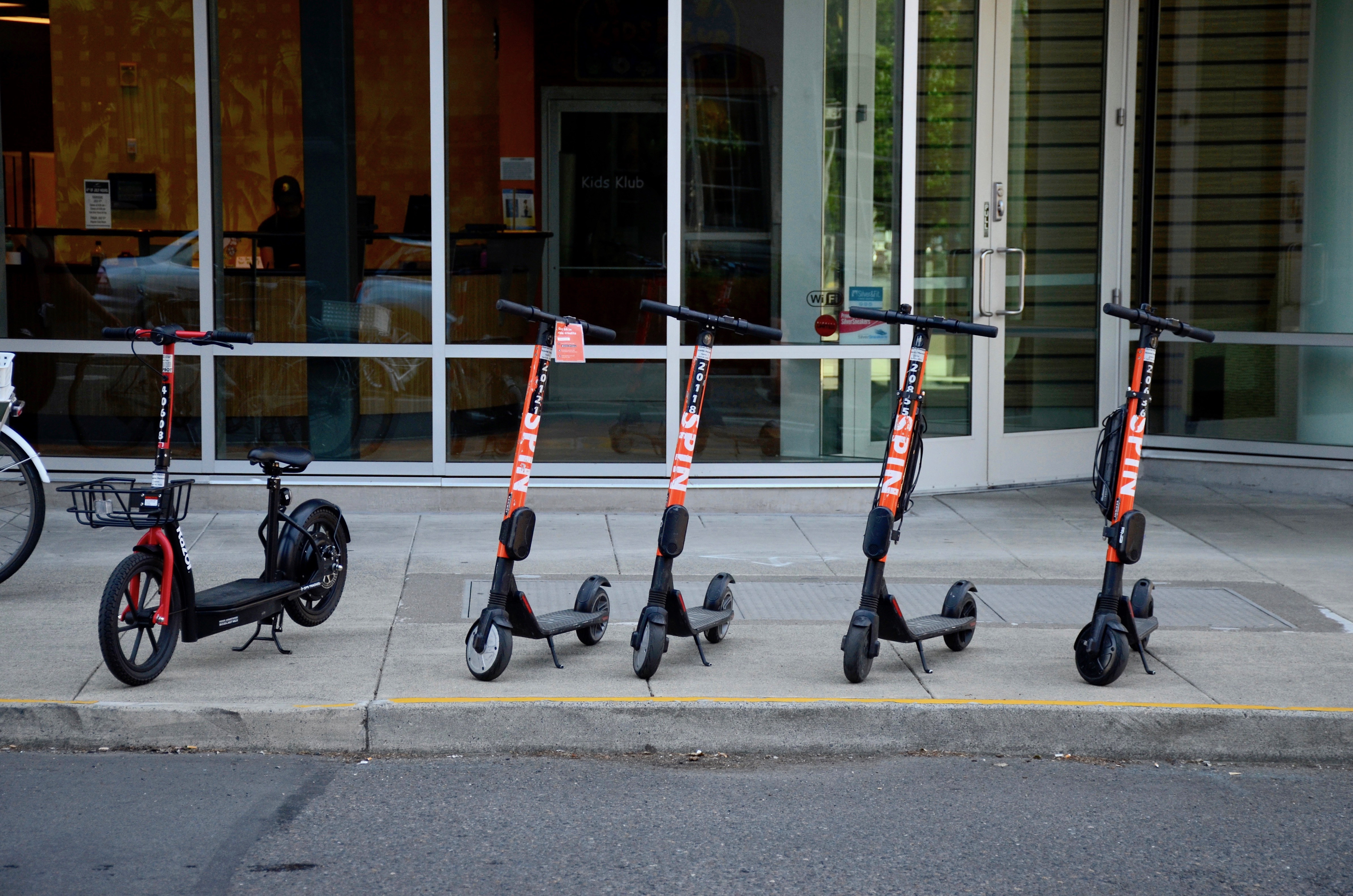
Ride-share scooters from two different providers parked on a sidewalk in Northwest Portland

Electric scooter sharing systems have become popular in the past few years as an alternative form of transportation. They first came to Portland in July 2018, after being approved for a four-month pilot program. Scooters returned to Portland in April 2019 for a one-year program after positive review by the city of the first program. The system works much like most bike share systems which have also become popular in Portland and around the world. Users unlock and pay for a scooter with an app on their smartphone and then can drop it off anywhere when done with it.

There were many complaints about the effectiveness and safety of the program when the program first returned to Portland. A report done by the city shows that over 700,000 rides were taken during the pilot program and that scooters are equally dangerous to other transportation systems but that many riders did not follow the safety regulations such as wearing a helmet. However despite this there are still a lot of concerns.

In response to some of the backlash around safety Portland instituted specific laws that apply to scooters, which include that all riders must wear a helmet, must be 16 or older, must not ride on the sidewalk or in city parks, and must yield to pedestrians.

In addition to some of the safety concerns there were also concerns about access both for low-income residents and residents with mobility issues. The city has responded to both of these and each scooter company now has discounted rates for low-income residents. These rates differ significantly by company with some being a small discount and others being up to 50 free rides of 30 minutes or less a month. All companies also offer options for non-smartphone users although most of these still require being able to receive SMS texts. The city has passed codes that outlaw leaving the scooters in the middle of sidewalks in response to complaints about the scooters, but it is unclear how often that is being enforced.

Despite all of these measures taken by the City of Portland as well as the individual companies there is still much concern and controversy around the scooters. Many are still concerned about inclusivity and disability access as well safety as all complaints about riders leaving or riding the scooters on the sidewalk and not wearing helmets will be dealt with by the private companies, not the city itself. There are also concerns about access to the scooters in all parts of Portland particularly the low-income neighborhoods as most of the scooters have been centered in downtown and other wealthier and popular tourist parts of the city.

As the program is still new there is a lack of data about whether or not this program is decreasing the reliance on cars and providing alternative forms of transportation in the city as its original goal. According to a report done by the city, 34% of local riders used the scooters instead of driving and 48% of visitors used the scooters rather than driving or using a rideshare system. It is unclear whether these numbers have increased or decreased with the new year-long program and as with other new technologies there are still many concerns surrounding the scooters.

In June 2019, more than 50 scooters from various companies were pulled out of the Willamette River in Portland by a dive team from the Multnomah County Sheriff’s office. It is unclear who put them there or why, and it is unclear how long they were there before being spotted by the divers.

== Traffic flow ==
Many streets in Portland are one-way; streets in downtown Portland (Southwest Portland bounded by I-405 and the Willamette River) are virtually all one-way, forming a grid of alternating street traffic: for north-south streets, odd-numbered avenues (1st, 3rd, etc.) are southbound, while even-numbered avenues (2nd, 4th, etc.) are northbound, and similarly east-west streets alternate. This is partly due to the streets in downtown Portland being relatively narrow (64 feet (20 m)). This grid extends a short way west across I-405 into Goose Hollow, terminating at SW 18th Avenue, and extends to some degree north across Burnside Street into the Pearl District, particularly with the north-south streets extending into Old Town.

Most streets on the east side are two-way, but there are a number of one-way pairs along major routes: Martin Luther King Jr. Blvd. (MLK)/Grand Avenue (the equivalent of 4th and 5th avenues), and 11th/12th east-west pairs are connected with bridges, with NE Couch/Burnside forming a pair east of the Burnside Bridge from 3rd to 14th avenues, SE Morrison/SE Belmont forming a pair from the Morrison Bridge to SE 25th Ave, and SE Madison/SE Hawthorne forming a pair from the Hawthorne Bridge to SE 12th Avenue.

== Highways ==
State highways, numbered as Interstate, U.S and Oregon Routes, in the metropolitan area include:

- I-5
- I-84
- I-205
- I-405
- US 26
- US 30
- US 30 Byp.
- OR 8
- OR 18
- OR 43
- OR 10
- OR 43
- OR 99E
- OR 99W
- OR 210
- OR 212
- OR 213
- OR 217
- OR 219
- OR 224
- SR 14
- SR 500
- SR 503

Notable highways never built, or removed altogether, include Mount Hood Freeway, Interstate 505, and Harbor Drive.

== Bridges ==
The large number of bridges in Portland has given the city its "Bridgetown" nickname.

=== Willamette River ===
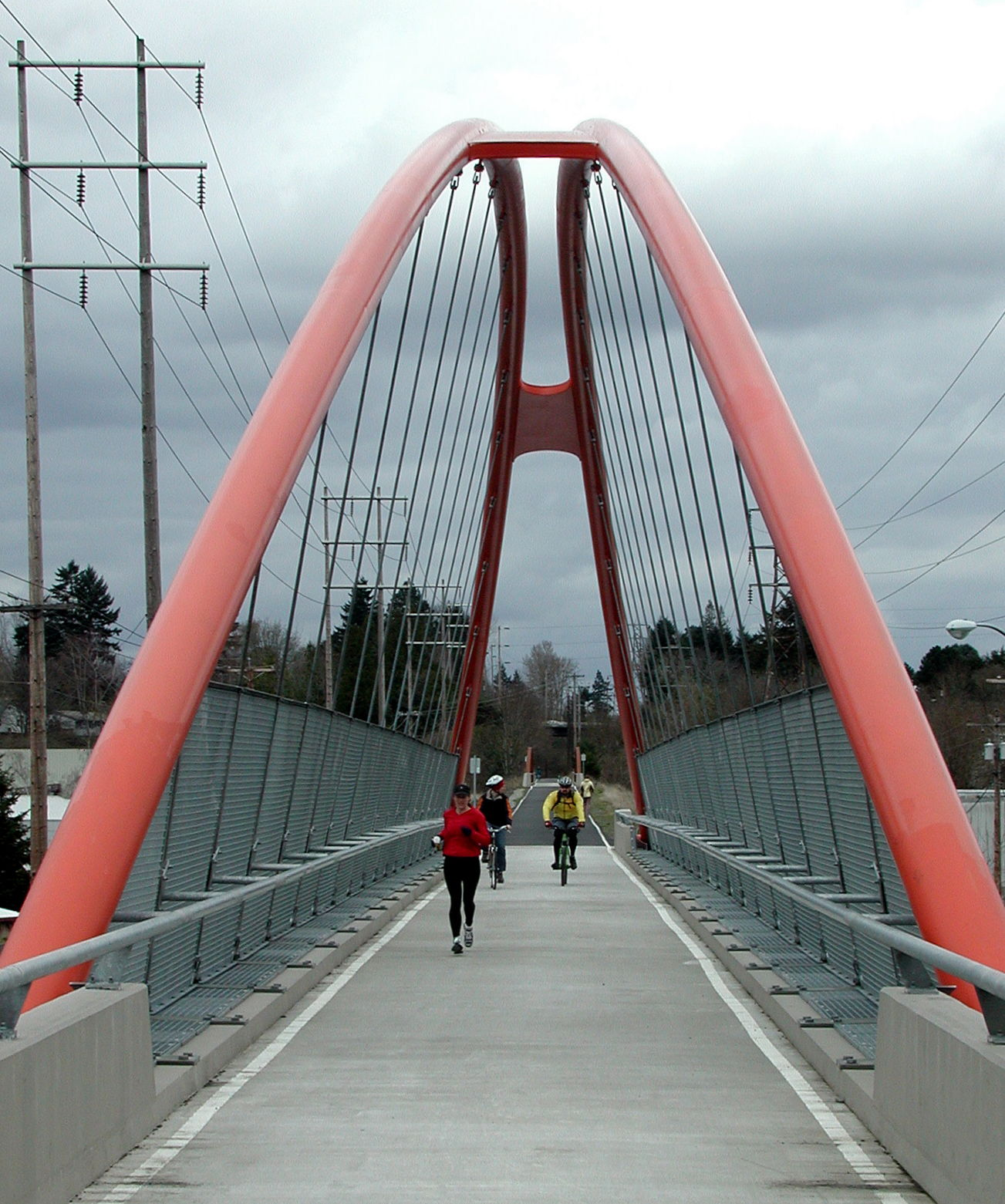
A pedestrian and bicycle bridge over S.E. McLoughlin Boulevard in Portland.

Bridges over the Willamette River, listed north to south:

- St. Johns Bridge (1931) – U.S. Route 30/N Philadelphia Avenue
- Burlington Northern Railroad Bridge 5.1 (1908)
- Fremont Bridge (1973) – Interstate 405
- Broadway Bridge (1913) – Broadway
- Steel Bridge (1912) – Pacific Highway West/former Oregon Route 99W
- Burnside Bridge (1926) – Burnside Street
- Morrison Bridge (1958) – Morrison Street
- Hawthorne Bridge (1910) – Hawthorne Boulevard
- Marquam Bridge (1966) – Interstate 5
- Tilikum Crossing (2015) – Longest car-free bridge in the U.S.
- Ross Island Bridge (1926) – U.S. Route 26/Powell Boulevard
- Sellwood Bridge (1925; replacement 2016) – SE Tacoma Street

=== Columbia River ===
Bridges over the Columbia River, listed west to east:

- Burlington Northern Railroad Bridge 9.6 (1908) – the first bridge of any kind across the lower Columbia River
- Interstate Bridge (1917/1958) – Interstate 5
- Glenn L. Jackson Memorial Bridge (1982) – Interstate 205

== Intercity service ==
Long-distance passenger rail service to Portland is provided by Amtrak, the national passenger rail system, with trains stopping at Union Station. Amtrak routes serving Portland include the Amtrak Cascades (with service to/from Vancouver, British Columbia and Eugene, Oregon), the Coast Starlight (with service to/from Los Angeles and Seattle), and the Empire Builder (with service to/from Portland and Chicago).

While long-distance rail options are somewhat limited and infrequent, Oregon has a well-connected intercity bus network offering numerous options for travel to and from the Portland metro area. The Cascades POINT provides daily service between Portland and Eugene, with stops at every Amtrak station in the Willamette Valley. The NorthWest POINT provides daily service between Portland and Astoria, with stops in several rural communities along U.S. Route 26 and towns along the Oregon Coast. BoltBus began offering service from Portland in May 2012, with Seattle as its first destination; It was succeeded by FlixBus when BoltBus discontinued operation. Additional bus services that bring passengers to and from the Portland area include Columbia County Rider, from St. Helens, Tillamook County Transportation District's service from Tillamook, the Central Oregon Breeze from Bend, and more.

== Airports ==
Portland's main airport is the Portland International Airport (IATA: PDX, ICAO: KPDX), located in the northeast quadrant, near the Columbia River, and 20 minutes by car from downtown. PDX is also connected to the downtown business and arts districts by the MAX Red Line. The city's first airport, Swan Island Municipal Airport, opened in 1927 and closed in the 1940s.

The Port of Portland's Hillsboro Airport (IATA: HIO, ICAO: KHIO) is an executive and general aviation airport located in Hillsboro, Oregon, and it the second busiest airport in the state. It is connected to the metropolitan area by the MAX Blue and Red lines, and is the starting point for many corporate and charter flights, including Nike, Inc.

Troutdale Airport also serves the area. Portland is also served by Wiley's Seaplane Port, a private seaplane base on the Willamette.

Portland is home to Oregon's only public use heliport, the Portland Downtown Heliport (ICAO: 61J).

== Other alternatives ==
Portlanders living downtown or in nearby neighborhoods have car sharing as an alternative, through Zipcar, which acquired Flexcar in 2007. As of 2017, there are over 5,000 members sharing 250 vehicles which are located in neighborhoods such as the Pearl District, Old Town Chinatown, the Lloyd District, Hawthorne, and Brooklyn.

Skateboarding and roller blading are welcome methods for travel around town. Downtown Portland includes signs labeled "skate routes" to aid the urban skater. The Wall Street Journal stated Portland "may be the most skateboard-friendly town in America."

== See also ==
- Frog Ferry
- Pedestrian crossings in Portland, Oregon
- Rose City Transit, TriMet's Portland-only predecessor
- Transportation in Seattle and Transportation in Vancouver for Pacific Northwest comparisons
- Portland Bureau of Transportation
- Plug-in electric vehicles in Oregon § Portland
- Snow removal in Portland, Oregon
