= Transportation in Oregon =

Overview
- Transit type: Rapid transit, commuter rail, buses, private automobile, Taxicab, bicycle, pedestrian, ferries

Operation
- Operator: Oregon Department of Transportation

The transportation system of Oregon is a cooperation of complex systems of infrastructure.

== Background ==
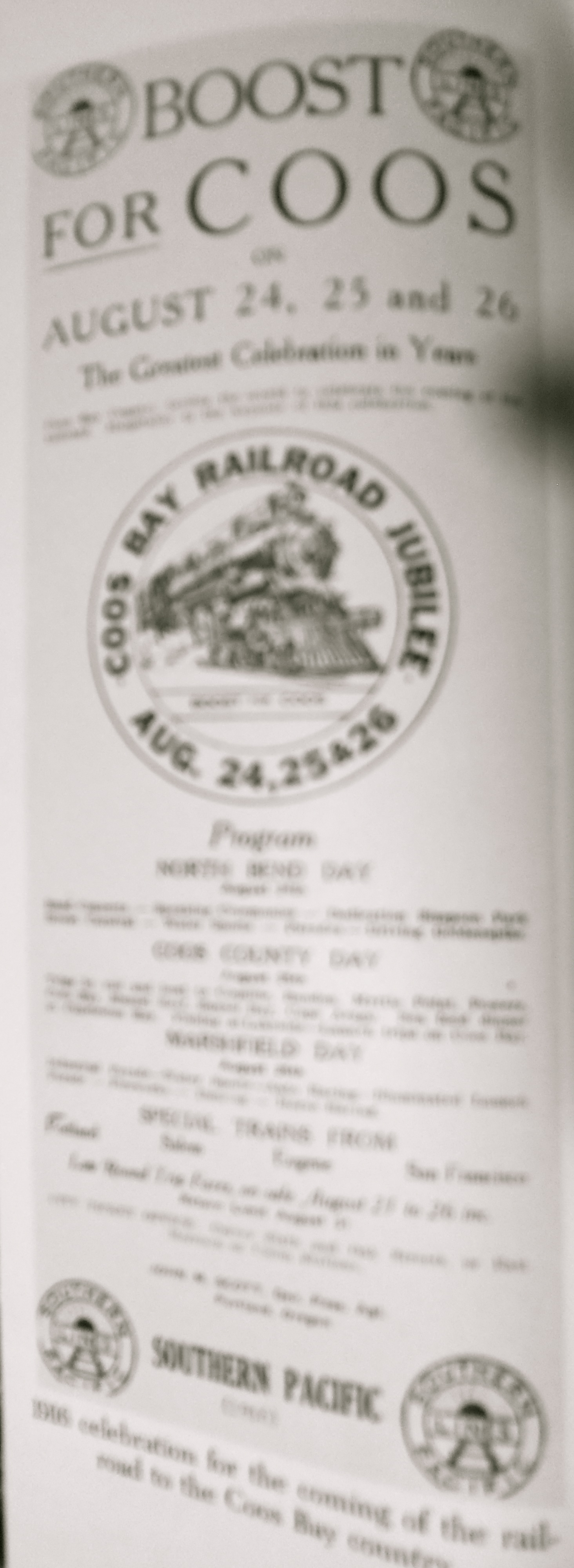
An advertisement for the celebration of the new Coos Bay Railroad

=== History ===
Steamboats and ferries were important early forms of transportation in early Oregon allowing trade along the Columbia and Willamette Rivers.

Wagon and stagecoach lines were another common method of transportation as the railways and roads began to develop.

The history of rail in Oregon predates the transcontinental railroad in 1869.

Early on, streetcars were pulled along rails using horse or mules.

As Oregon was aligned with the union states during the American Civil War, a railroad connection was proposed to help supply the Union and build morale.

With the introduction of hydroelectric power. Extensive interurban electric railway systems with trolley cars were developed primarily for passenger transport. They were used extensively for a period of time, however with the introduction of automobiles their popularity diminished.

== Mass Transit ==
Metropolitan Area Express (MAX) is a light rail system in the Portland metropolitan area in the U.S. state of Oregon. It is operated by TriMet and currently has five lines: Blue, Green, Red, Yellow, and Orange.

=== Rail ===
As of 2004, the state of Oregon has over 2,400 mi (3,862 km) (route-miles) of track, and 170 mi (274 km) of railroad right-of-way after peaking in the 1930s at about 4,350 miles (7,001 km) of track. Oregon is served by two Class 1 railroads, which account for over 1,100 miles (1,770 km) of trackage, and over twenty Class 2 and Class 3 operators. Three Amtrak routes serve the state, primarily through the Willamette Valley and south-central Oregon. Rail is a key element of the mass transit system in the city of Portland and surrounding communities. And numerous tourist railways operate in the state.

Oregon is currently served by two Class 1 railroads, the BNSF Railway and the Union Pacific Railroad (UP). Prior to its acquisition by the UP in 1996, Oregon was also served by the Southern Pacific Transportation Company; the UP continues to operate on tracks acquired from the SP.

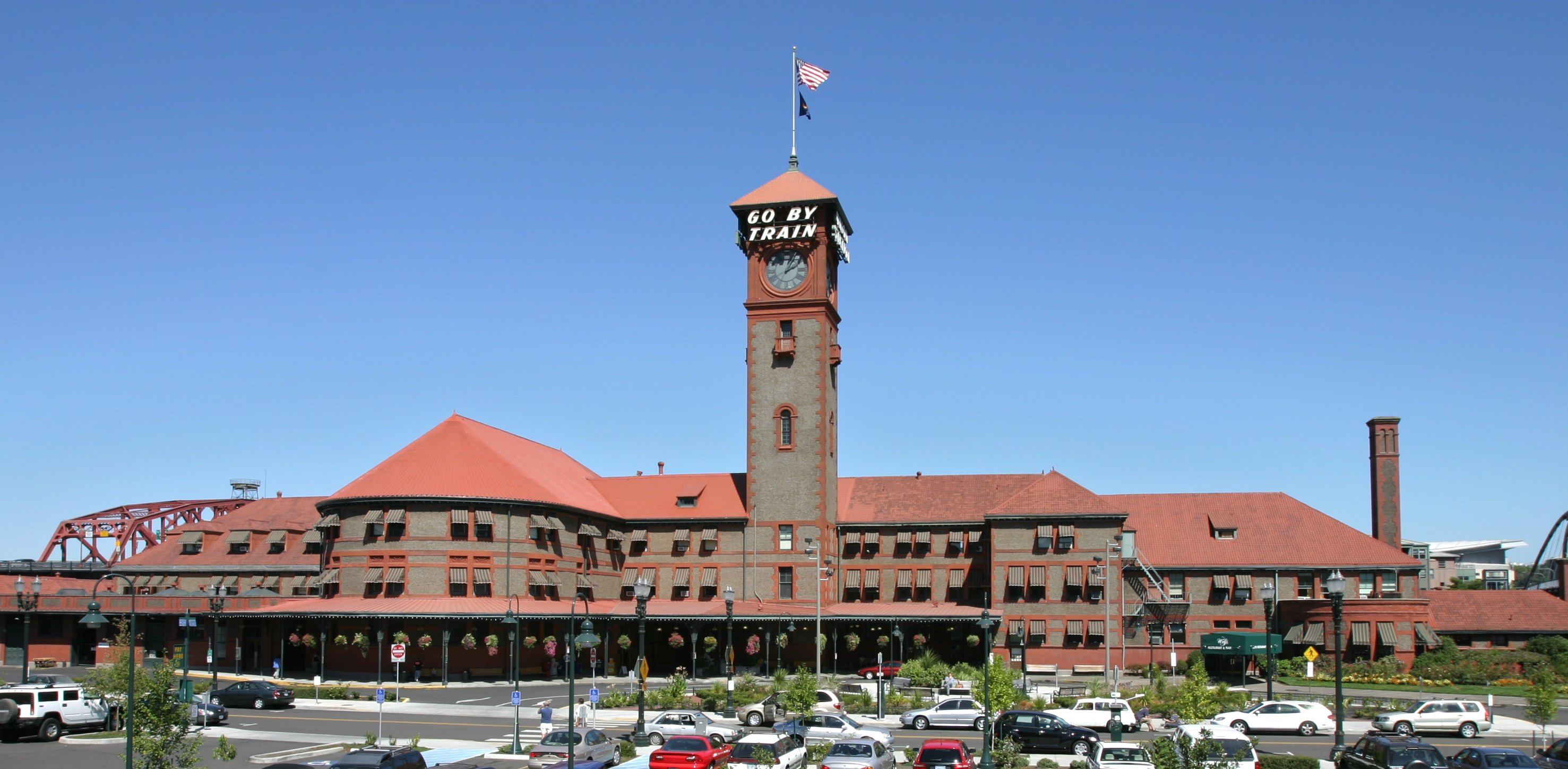
Portland's Union Station

Long-haul passenger service is provided by Amtrak, which operates in Oregon on the north-south Union Pacific mainline south of Portland, and on BNSF tracks into Washington to the north and east. Three Amtrak routes provide service to Oregon:

- The Coast Starlight, running from Seattle, Washington to Los Angeles, California provides service to Portland, Salem, Albany, Eugene, Chemult, and Klamath Falls.
- The Amtrak Cascades, running from Vancouver, British Columbia to Eugene, serves Portland, Oregon City, Salem, Albany, and Eugene.
- The Empire Builder, running from Portland to Chicago, Illinois, provides service to Portland. Immediately after departing Portland, the train crosses into Washington, and does not serve any other Oregon community.

==== Transit and commuter rail ====
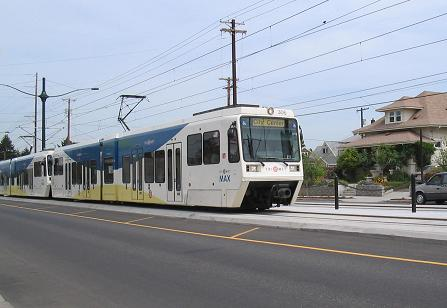
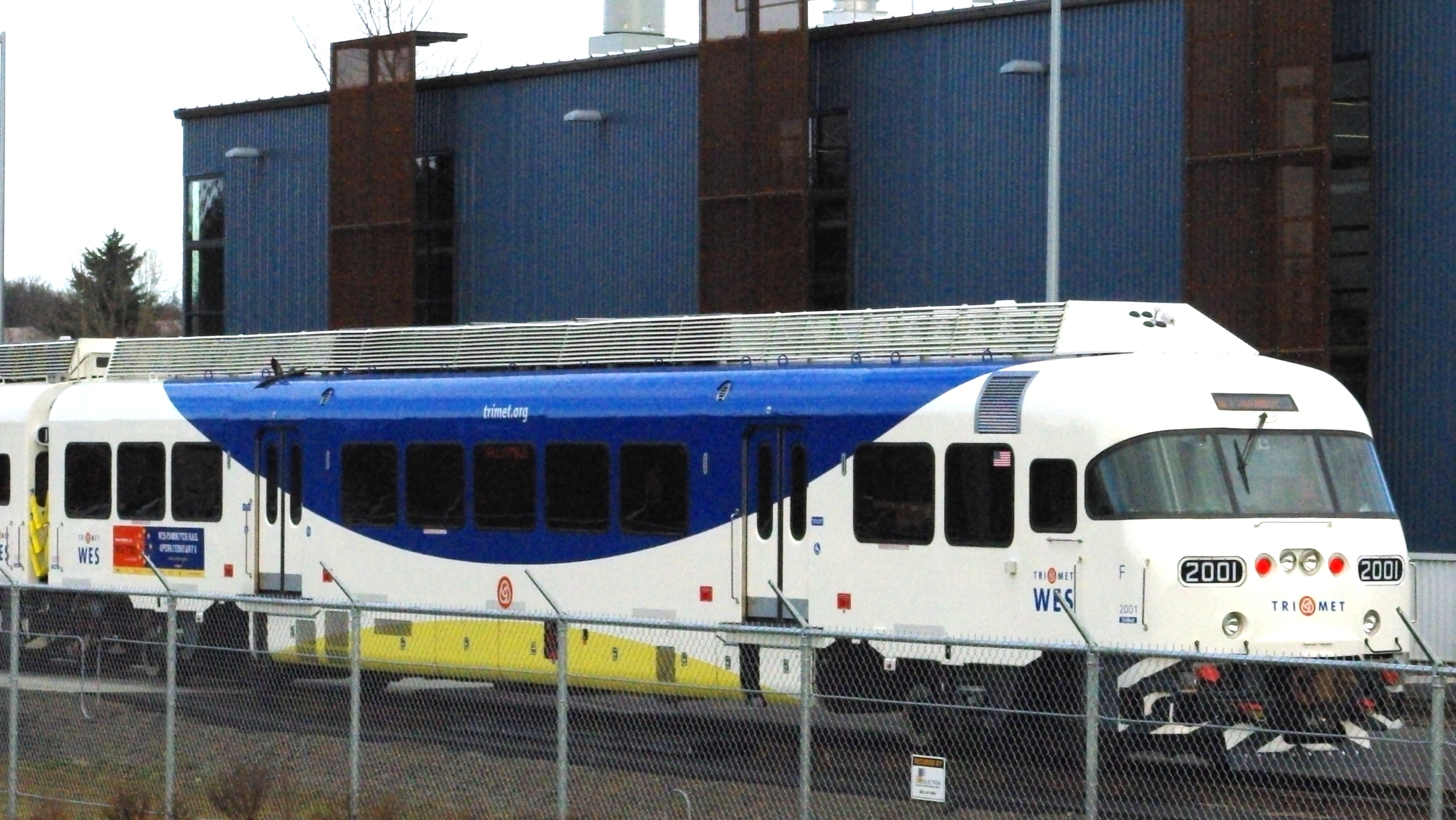
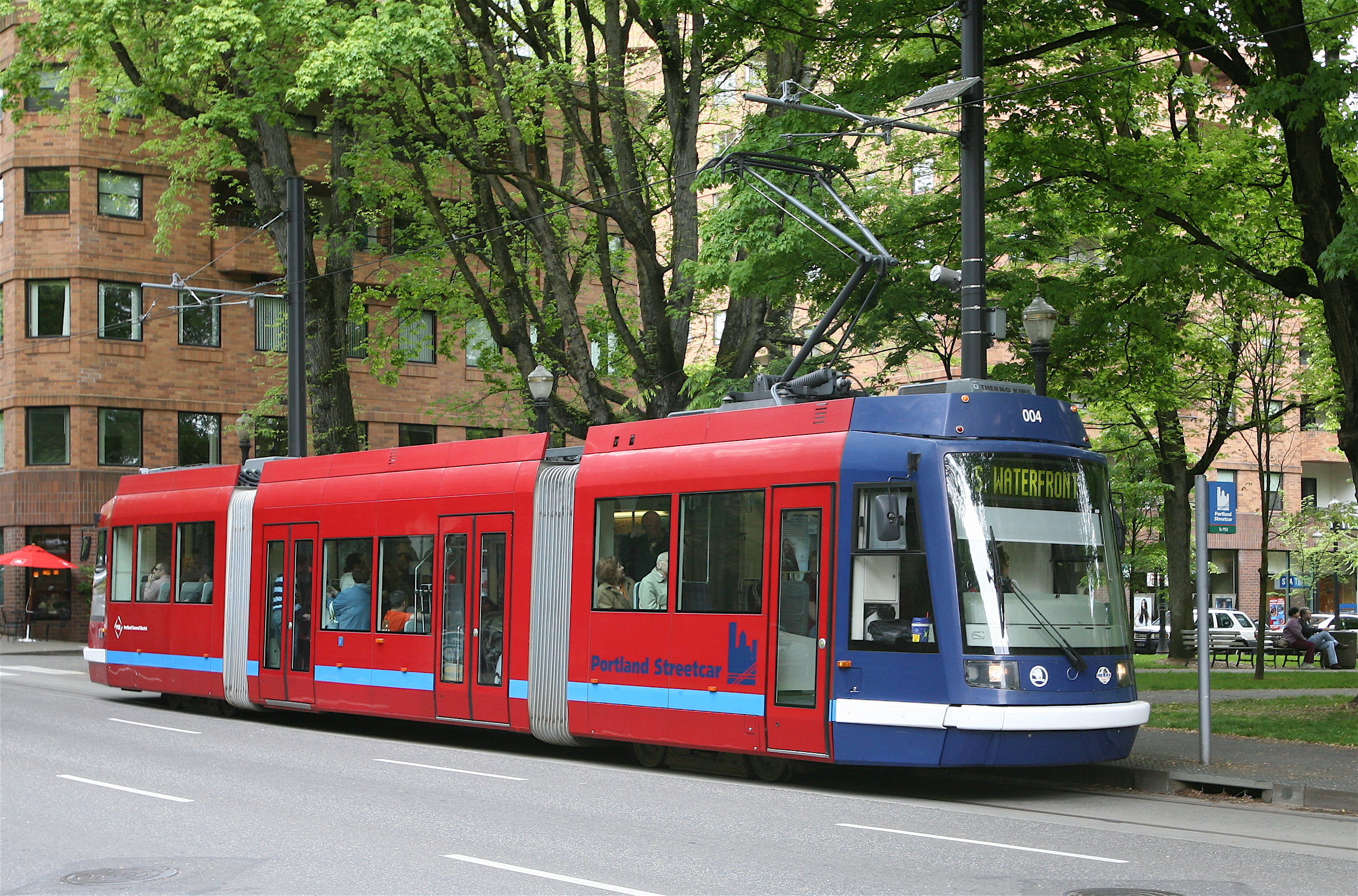
Left to Right: MAX light rail, WES commuter rail car, Portland Streetcar.

Rail transit is a key part of the local and regional transportation network in Portland and its surrounding communities. Two electrically powered rail systems and one diesel-powered commuter rail system presently provide transit service in the Portland metropolitan area.

- The MAX Light Rail system, a 52.4-mile (84.3 km) light rail system operated by TriMet (the transit authority for the Portland area), presently serves the cities of Portland, Beaverton, Hillsboro, and Gresham on four separate lines. The first line opened in 1986, running for 15 miles (24 km) east from downtown Portland to Gresham. A second line opened in 1998, extending the system west from downtown to Beaverton and Hillsboro, and this was operated as an extension of the eastside line, the combined route being designated the Blue Line in 2000-2001. The Red Line opened in 2001, providing service to Portland International Airport; the Yellow Line opened in 2004, with service to north Portland; and the Green Line opened in 2009, with service to Clackamas. In the future, service is proposed to be extended to Milwaukie, a project tentatively referred to as the Orange Line, and perhaps eventually to Oregon City and Vancouver, Washington.
- The Portland Streetcar is an electrically powered streetcar (or tram) system which presently serves the inner westside, downtown Portland and the South Waterfront District. It runs between the Northwest district and the South Waterfront, also providing service to the Pearl District, Portland State University, and Oregon Health and Science University. Unlike MAX, which primarily runs in its own right-of-way, the streetcar shares most of its right-of-way with vehicular traffic. The streetcar interchanges with both the MAX system and the Portland Aerial Tram, an aerial cableway. Opened in 2001 and extended three times since then, the streetcar line is currently 4 miles (6.4 km) end-to-end, but construction of a second line began in August 2009 and will extend the system by 3.3 miles (5.3 km), crossing the Willamette River to serve the inner eastside district.
- WES Commuter Rail is a 14.7-mile (23.7 km) diesel-powered commuter rail service which began operating in early 2009 and runs between the cities of Beaverton and Wilsonville on existing freight trackage. It has three intermediate stops, two of which serve the cities of Tigard and Tualatin, and connects with MAX at the Beaverton Transit Center. The vehicles are operated by Portland and Western Railroad under contract with TriMet, but the transit agency owns the DMU-type rail cars and maintenance facility (and employs the vehicle maintenance personnel), and all funding for operations comes from TriMet.

=== Bus ===
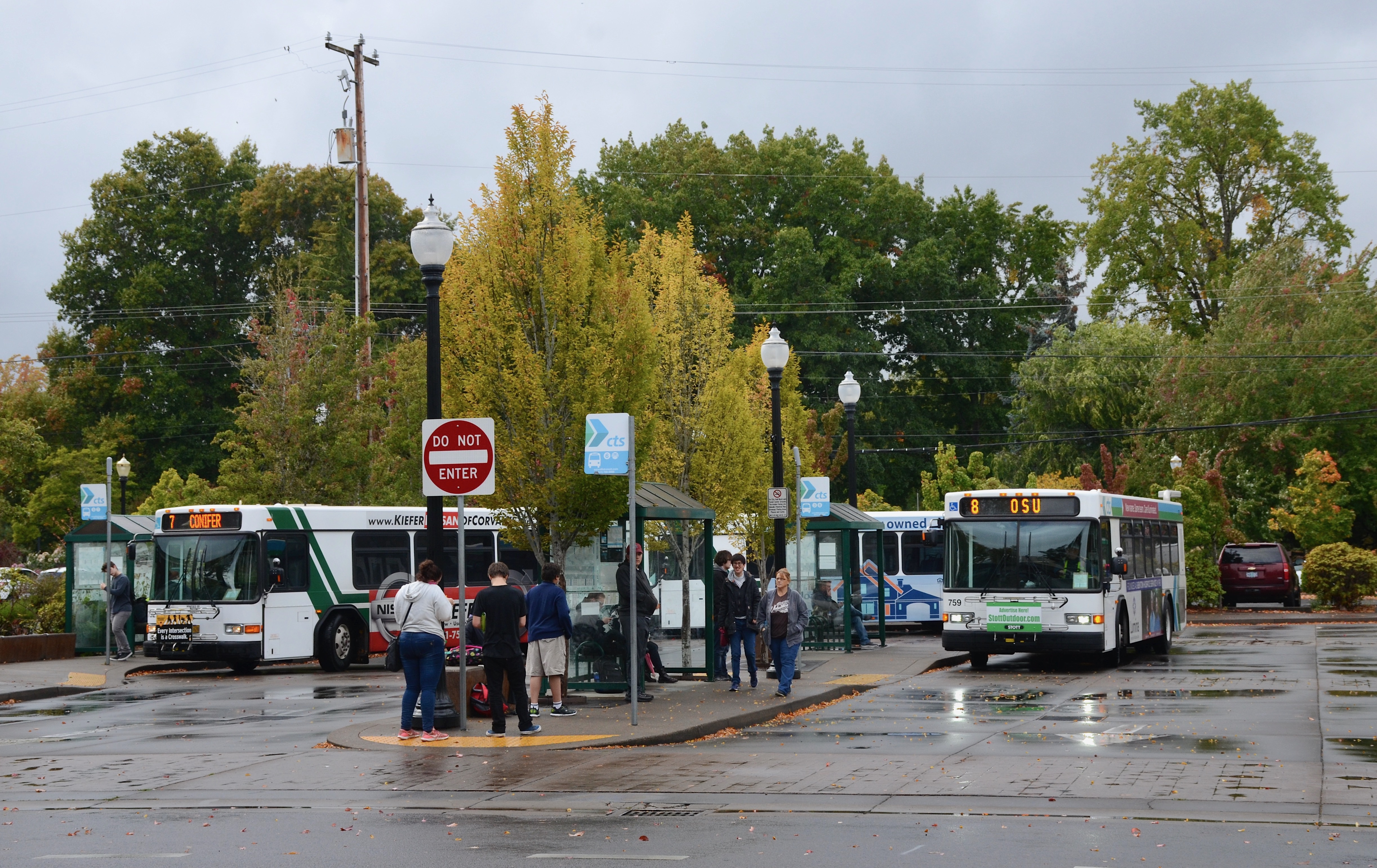
Buses at the Downtown Transit Center in Corvallis

The Emerald Express (EmX) is a bus rapid transit (BRT) system in the Eugene-Springfield metropolitan area in Oregon, United States. It is provided by the Lane Transit District (LTD) which is the public transit authority in Lane County, Oregon.

The Lane Transit District (LTD) is a public agency that provides public transportation in Lane County, Oregon, United States. The transit district serves the Eugene metropolitan area, including the neighboring cities of Springfield, Junction City, Creswell, Cottage Grove, Veneta, and Lowell. LTD began service in 1970 with 20 vehicles, and today provides over 20,000 bus trips a week, with a fleet of 102 buses. Many of LTD's riders are students; University of Oregon and Lane Community College students ride for free. Both programs are subsidized by student fees, as well as limited late-night service until about 2am.

The Confederated Tribes of the Umatilla Indian Reservation is one of several tribal governments in the northwestern United States to offer free bus service on its reservation.

== Roads and freeways ==
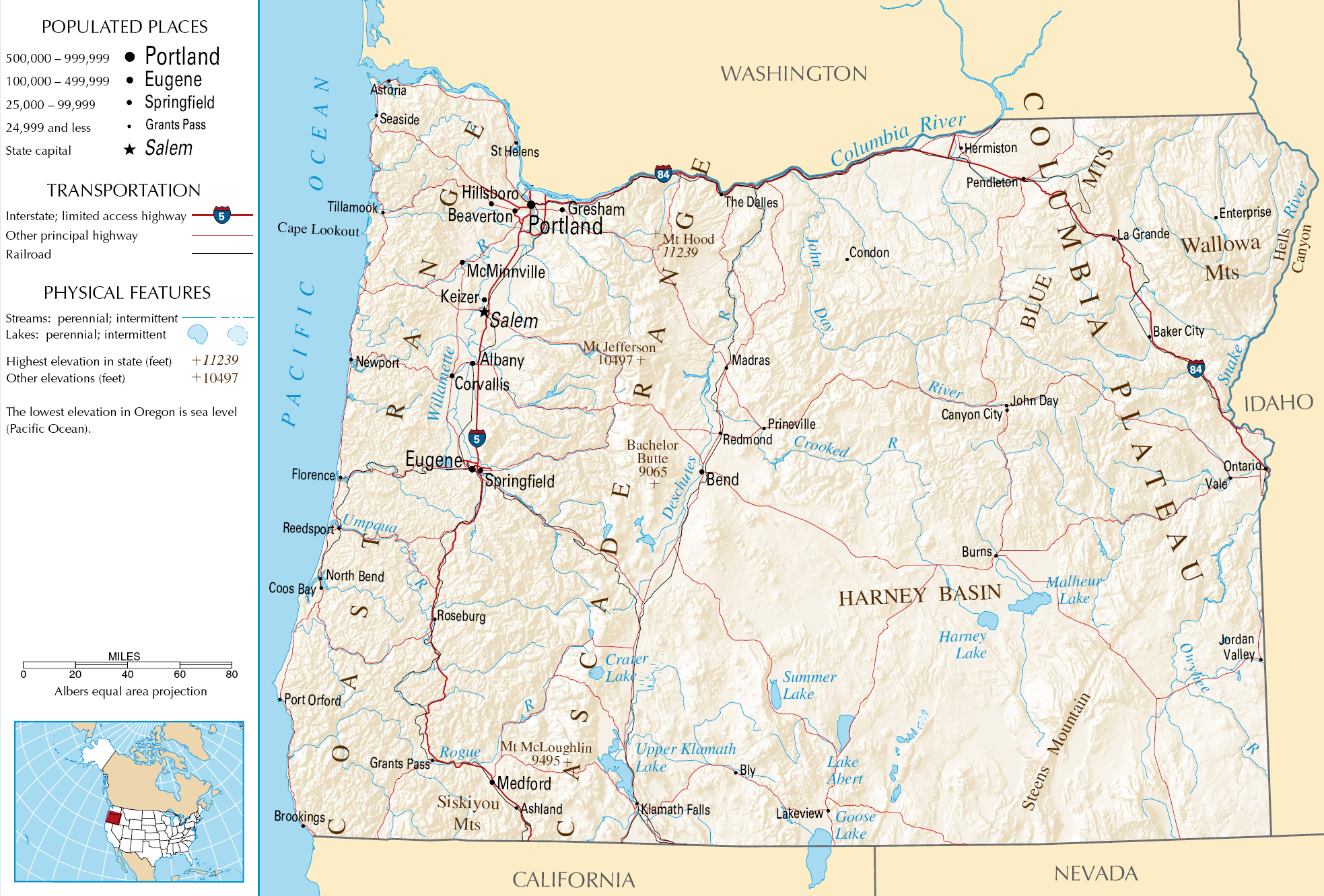
Map of Oregon showing major roads and cities

From 1951-2023, Oregon did not allow citizens to pump their own gas, but the ban was lifted in 2023 statewide.

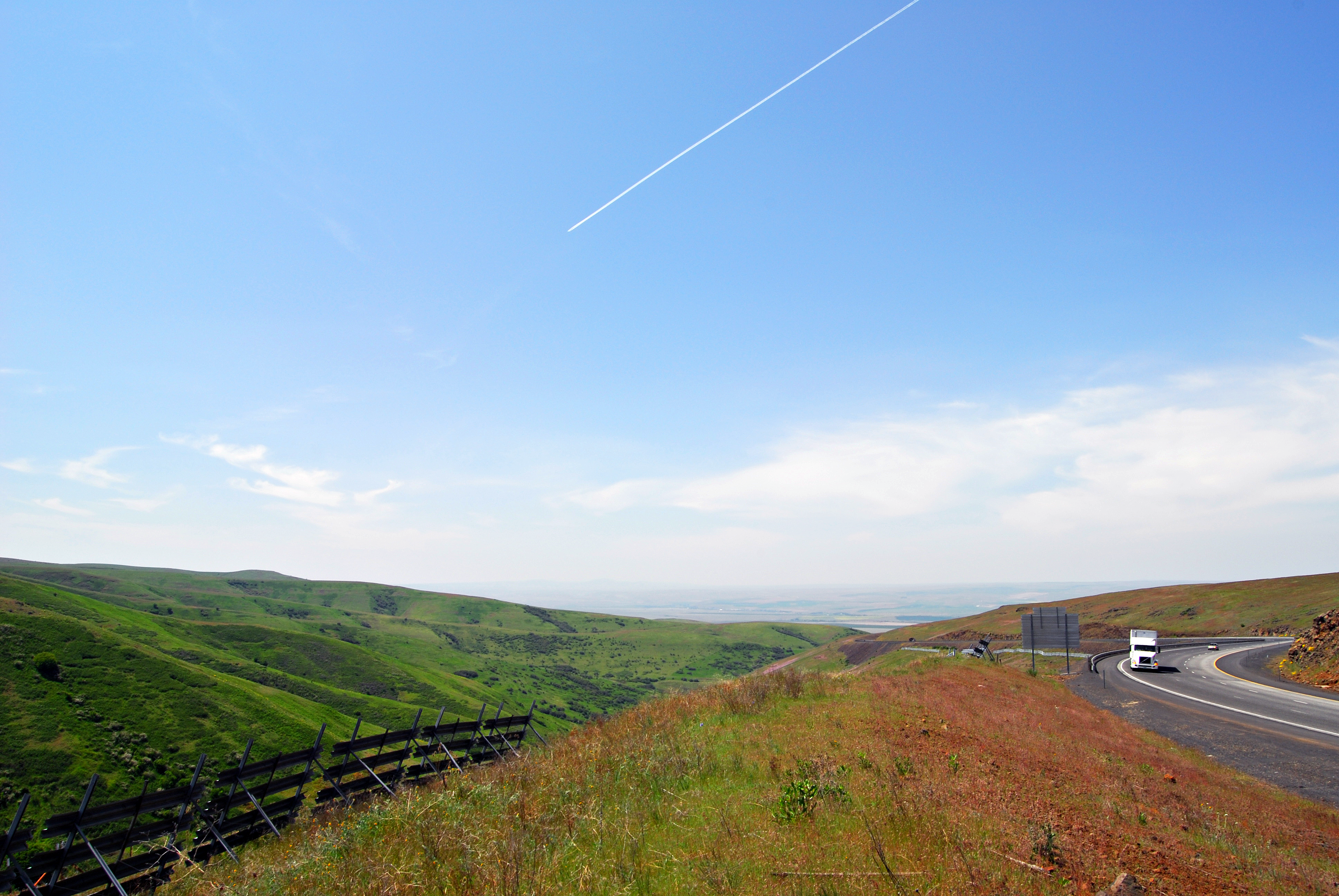
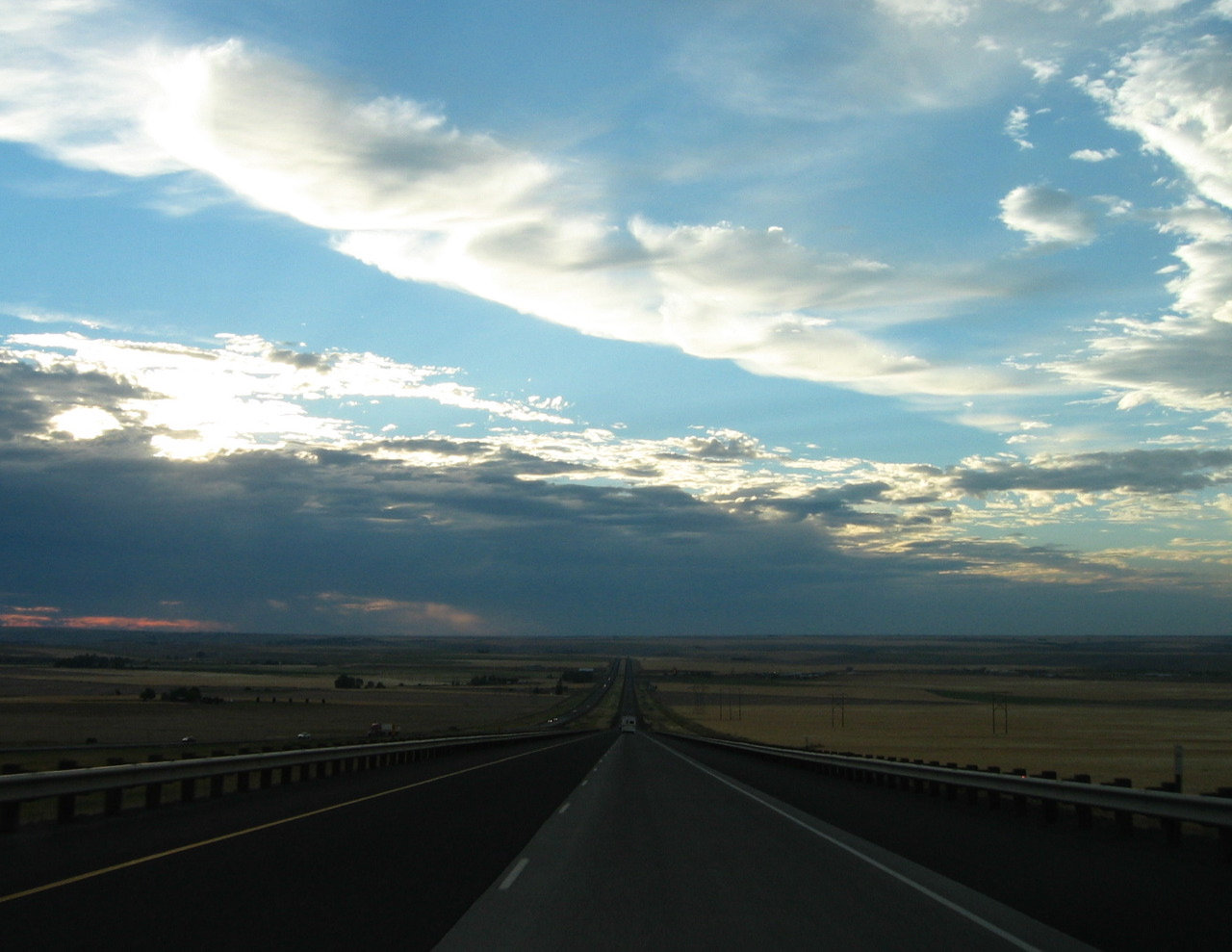
I-84 near Pendleton (top) and past Deadman Pass and the Blue Mountains (bottom).

In the U.S. state of Oregon, Interstate 84 travels east–west, following the Columbia River and the rough path of the old Oregon Trail from Portland east to Idaho. For this reason, it is also known as most of the Columbia River Highway No. 2 and all of the Old Oregon Trail Highway No. 6 (see Oregon highways and routes). It also follows along or near U.S. Route 30. The entire highway carried the designation Interstate 80N (I-80N, or Interstate 80 North) until 1980, when this was changed to I-84.

=== Bridges and tunnels ===
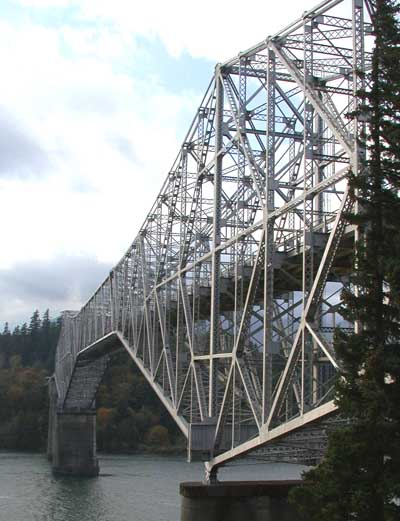
Bridge of the Gods named after a famous geologic event also known as Bridge of the Gods.

The Bridge of the Gods is a steel truss cantilever bridge that spans the Columbia River between Cascade Locks, Oregon and Washington state near North Bonneville. It is approximately 40 miles (64 kilometers) east of Portland, Oregon and 4 miles (6.4 km) upriver from the Bonneville Dam. It currently serves as a toll bridge operated by the Port of Cascade Locks.

The bridge was built by the Wauna Toll Bridge Company of Walla Walla, Washington and opened in 1926 at a length of 1,127 feet (343 m). The higher river levels resulting from the construction of the Bonneville Dam required the bridge to be further elevated and extended to its current length of 1,856 feet (565 m).

The Robertson Tunnel is a tunnel through the west hills of Portland, Oregon, U.S. for the TriMet public transit MAX Light Rail system. The tunnel is 3.1 miles (5.0 km) long and consists of twin 21 foot (6.4 m) diameter tunnels. There is one station within the tunnel at Washington Park, the third deepest such station in the world. The tunnel has won several worldwide engineering and environmental awards. It was placed into service September 12, 1998.

== Personal transportation ==
=== Private automobiles ===
Private automobiles still fulfill the majority of transportation needs.

=== Pedestrians, and bicycles ===
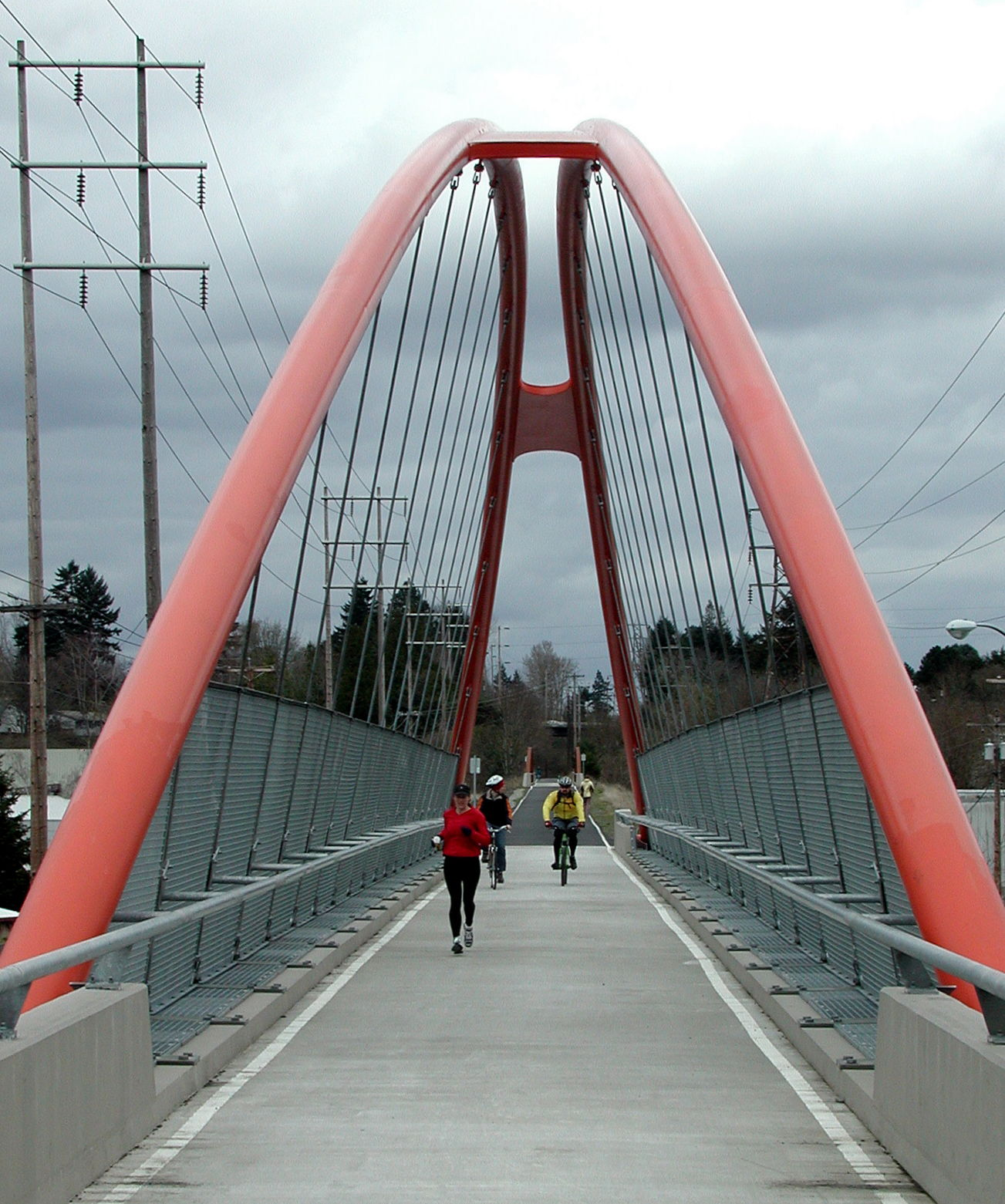
The Springwater Trail, part of the 40-Mile Loop, crosses over McLoughlin Boulevard (Oregon Route 99E) near Sellwood.

At 2.5% in 2012, Oregon had the highest bicycle commuting mode share of any state (behind only Washington, D.C.) with the cities of Portland, Eugene, Corvallis, and Baker City each reporting bicycle commuting rates in excess of 5%.

The 40-Mile Loop is a partially completed greenway trail around and through Portland in the U.S. State of Oregon. It was proposed in 1903 by the Olmsted Brothers architecture firm as part of the development of Forest Park. One greenway expert calls it "one of the most creative and resourceful greenway projects in the country."

== Port Infrastructure ==
=== Airports ===
City served	FAA	IATA	ICAO	Airport name	Role	Enpl.
Commercial Service – Primary Airports
Eugene	EUG	EUG	KEUG	Eugene Airport (Mahlon Sweet Field)	P-N	358,819
Klamath Falls	LMT	LMT	KLMT	Klamath Falls Airport (Kingsley Field)	P-N	26,970
Medford	MFR	MFR	KMFR	Rogue Valley International-Medford Airport	P-N	287,688
North Bend	OTH	OTH	KOTH	Southwest Oregon Regional Airport (was North Bend Municipal)	P-N	35,458
Portland	PDX	PDX	KPDX	Portland International Airport	P-M	7,090,526
Redmond	RDM	RDM	KRDM	Redmond Municipal Airport (Roberts Field)	P-N	235,192

=== Ports and Harbors ===
The Port of Bandon is the port authority for Bandon Harbor in the city of Bandon, Oregon, United States. The port has full marina facilities for boat launching and sport fishing. It also serves as a waypoint stopover for commercial fishing and recreation vessels, and has a scenic boardwalk with a nature pathway and observation areas. The United States Coast Guard operates Search and Rescue Detachment Coquille River in Bandon Harbor in the summer and on halibut season weekend openers in the spring, and is equipped with a 47-foot motor life boat and crew.

== See also ==
- Frog Ferry
- Plug-in electric vehicles in Oregon
