= Snow removal in Portland, Oregon =

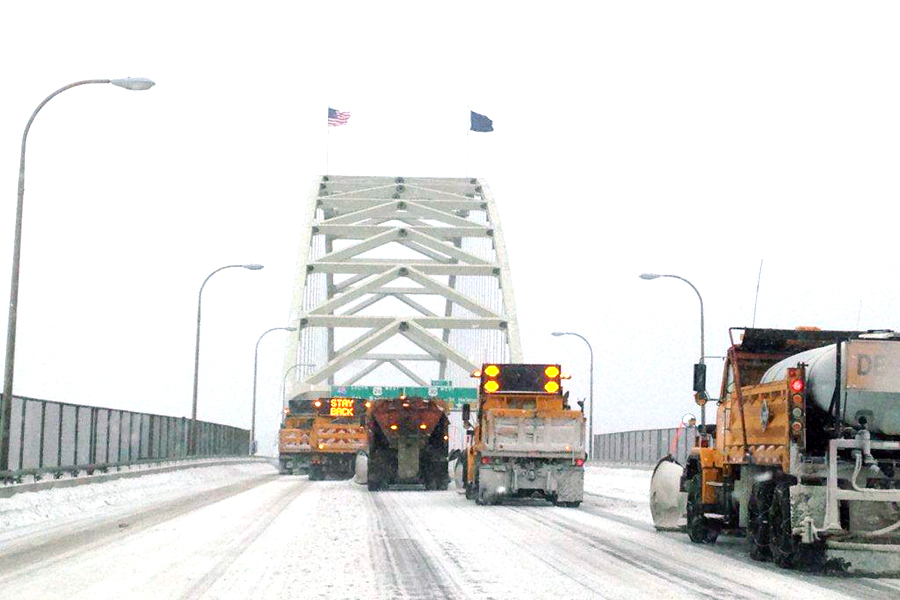
Snow removal operations by the Oregon Department of Transportation under way on the Fremont Bridge in Portland, Oregon, 2014

The American city of Portland, Oregon has a fleet of snowplows operated by the Portland Bureau of Transportation (PBOT). The city has 56 snowplows, as of 2026, ten of which have been named via two contests open to submissions and voting by the public since 2024. While PBOT plows local roads, the Oregon Department of Transportation (ODOT) plows highways in the Portland metropolitan area.

== Portland Bureau of Transportation ==
The city's snowplow fleet is operated by the Portland Bureau of Transportation (PBOT). 112 employees were trained as snowplow drivers in 2019.

PBOT plows approximately 0.5 inches off the ground. In 2017, Willamette Week said the bureau's 55 snowplows covered approximately 5,000 miles of road, averaging one snowplow for every 100 miles of roadway. According to The Oregonian, "Priority goes to streets that are most critical for emergency responders, hospitals, schools and transit, as well as downtown and other business districts."

Mayor Sam Adams rode with snowplow drivers during a storm in 2008. The bureau provided an interactive map of the snowplows in action in 2021. Similar maps were provided in 2024 and 2025.

=== Fleet size and maintenance ===
In 2008, Michael Milstein of The Oregonian described the fleet of approximately 50 snowplows as "decades old" and said drivers "faced the snow with battered plows dating to the 1970s".

Snowplows are inspected annually and expected to carry a first aid kit and a fire extinguisher, among other supplies. Portland had between 45 and 55 snowplows in 2017. One winter storm in early 2017 prompted Seattle Department of Transportation to send 11 snowplows and 15 crew members temporarily. News outlets reported that PBOT operated 56–57 snowplows in 2021; Jennifer Kristiansen of Willamette Week called this "relatively few".

=== Training ===
Drivers are trained annually and PBOT has maintained an obstacle course for practice at northeast Portland's Sunderland Yard. In 2019, Daniel Bromfield of Willamette Week wrote, "Plow drivers relearn every October and November how to put on various chains and sanders and operate each of the three sizes of trucks used in plowing. If routes change or new roads are added in the city, they're considered in the obstacle course. The yearly event is as much about PR as training—PBOT encourages news crews to cover the course and even allows civilians to take the wheel from time to time, to encourage Portlanders to appreciate the difficulty of driving a plow and the dangers posed by a truck loaded with gravel and heavy machinery." Drivers also practice by driving routes without the plows attached.

When not using snowplows, trained drivers complete other tasks related to street maintenance such as filling potholes, maintaining gravel, and paving.

=== Snowplow naming contests ===
In 2026, Taylor Griggs of the Portland Mercury wrote, "PBOT's rationale for the snow plow naming contest is quite smart. By giving the snow plows names and differentiating between them, the city is putting an end to the very false urban legend that the city of Portland only owns one plow."

==== 2024–2025 season ====
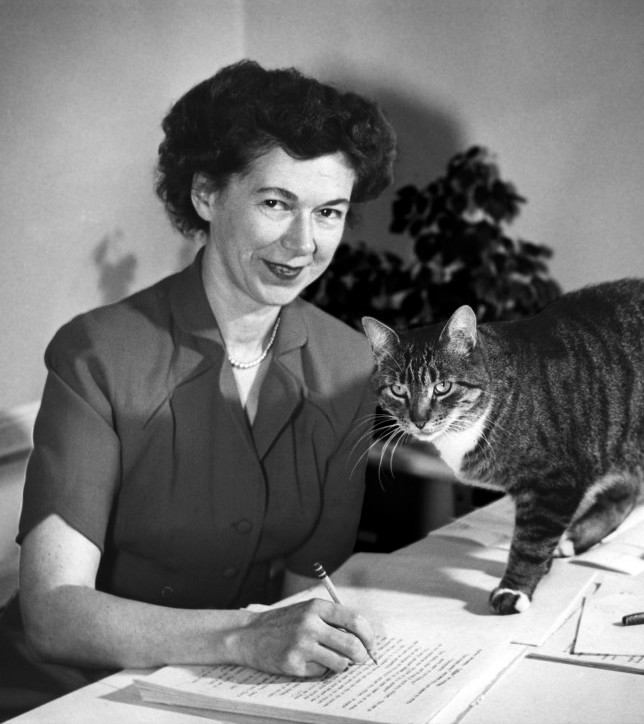
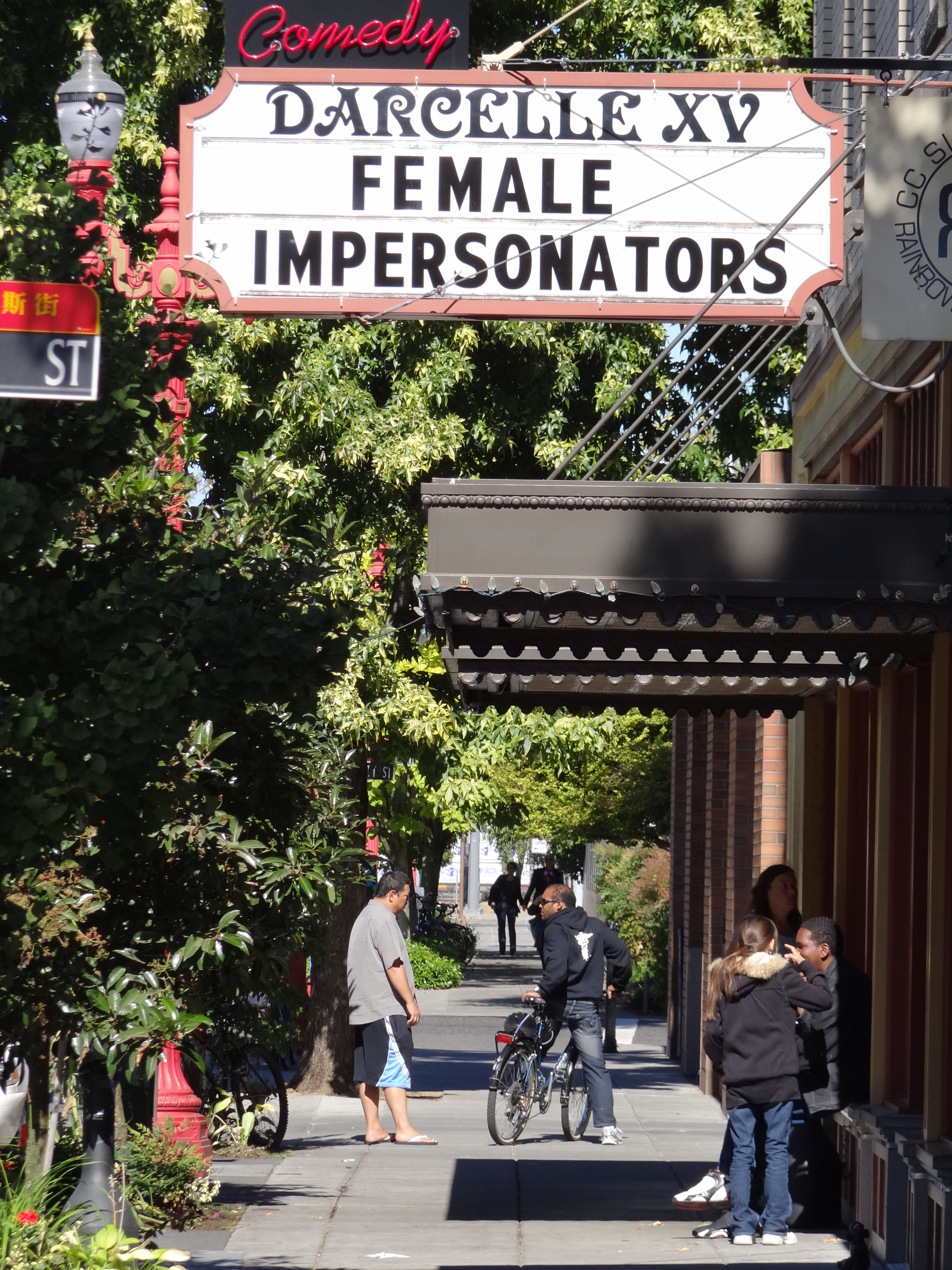
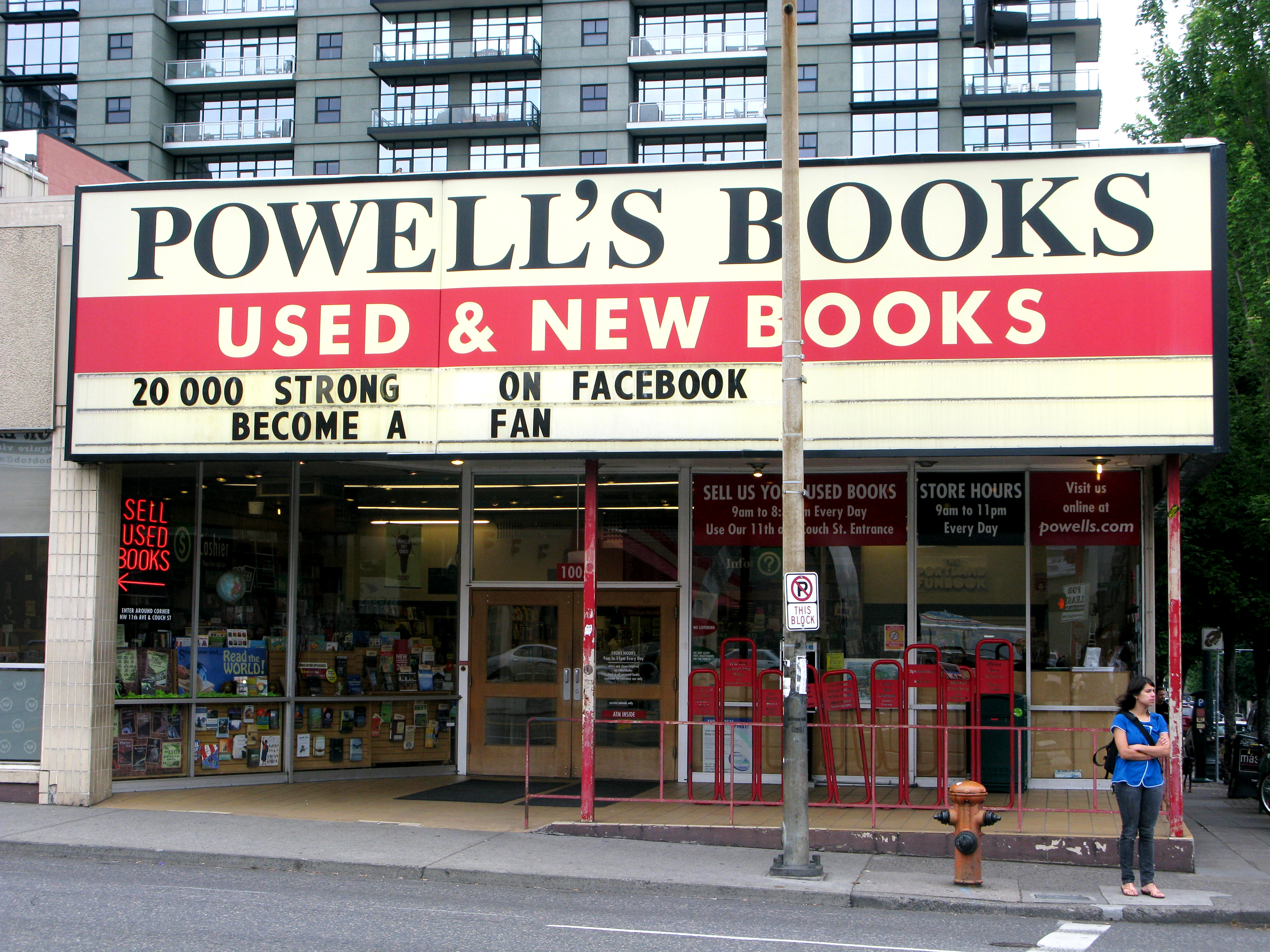
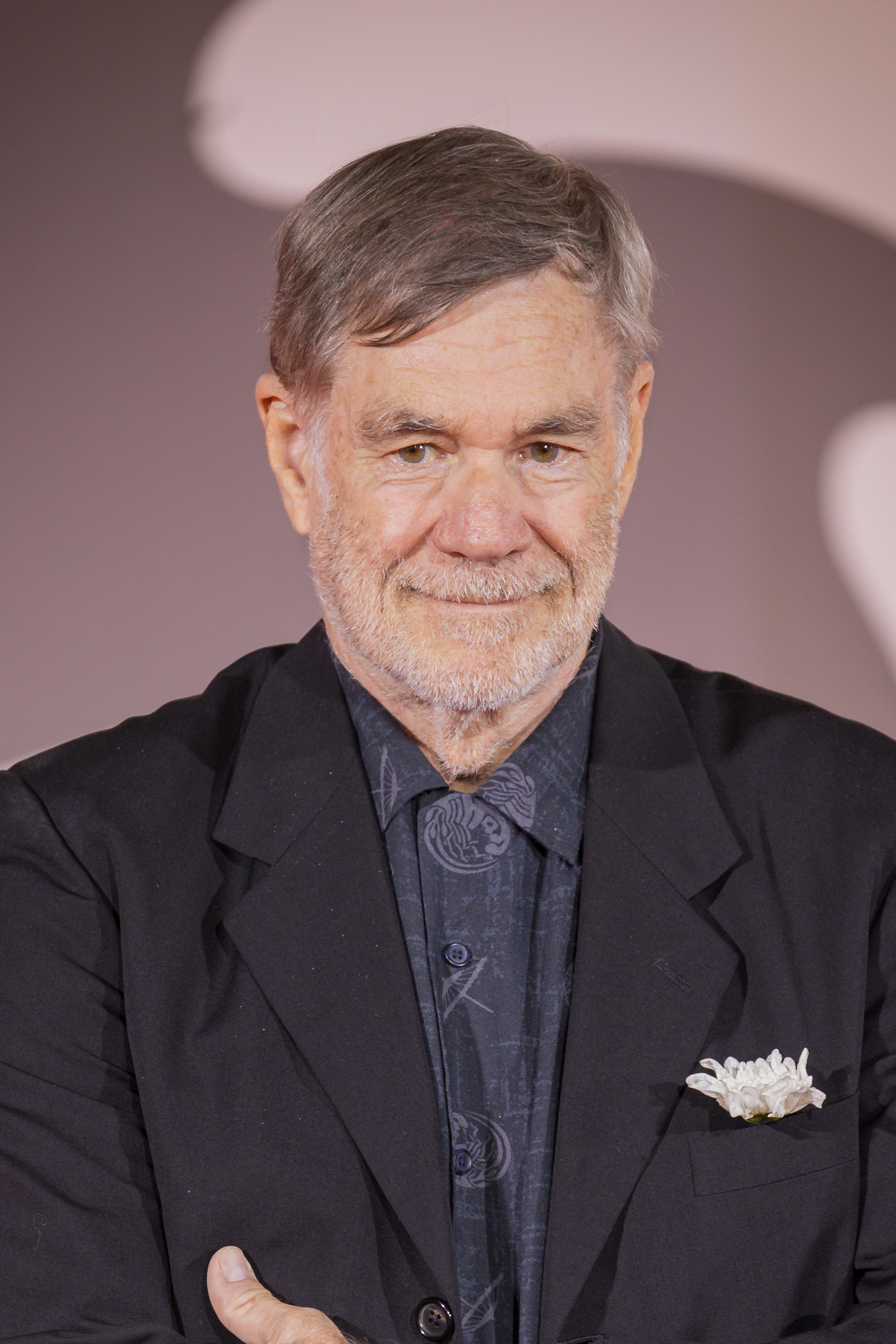
Finalists for the 2024–2025 naming contest included puns based on people and businesses related to Portland, Oregon, including (pictured clockwise): Beverly Cleary, Darcelle XV Showplace, Gus Van Sant, and Powell's Books.

External media
- PBOT unveils this year's snowplows — including 'Plowy McPlowFace' on YouTube, KGW
- Meet ‘Plowy McPlowface,’ one of PBOT’s newly named snowplows on YouTube, KGW
- PBOT unveils new names for snowplows on YouTube, KOIN
- PBOT unveils ‘Plowy McPlowface’, 4 other newly-named snowplows on YouTube, KPTV

In December 2024, PBOT invited the public to submit names for five of the city's 56 snowplows as part of a contest. Within two weeks, 4,000 submissions yielded 3,000 unique names. The twenty finalists selected by PBOT, many of which were puns related to Portland, were:

- Beverly Clear-y, inspired by American writer Beverly Cleary
- The Big Leplowski, inspired by the 1998 film The Big Lebowski
- Brrrrnside, inspired by Burnside Street
- The Columbia Plough, inspired by the Columbia Slough
- Darcelle XV Snowplace, inspired by the drag venue Darcelle XV Showplace
- Dave's Killer Sled, inspired by Dave's Killer Bread
- Froster-Plowell, inspired by the Foster-Powell neighborhood
- Gus Van Sand, inspired by filmmaker Gus Van Sant
- Keep Portland Cleared, inspired by the slogan "Keep Portland Weird"
- Meltnomah Falls, inspired by Multnomah Falls
- Mr. Plow
- Plow Bunyan, inspired by Paul Bunyan
- Plowlandia, inspired by the TV series Portlandia
- Plow-ell Butte, inspired by Powell Butte
- Plowell's, inspired by Powell's Books
- Plower to the People
- Plowy McPlowface
- Salt & Thaw, inspired by the ice cream business Salt & Straw
- Sleeter-Kinney, inspired by the rock band Sleater-Kinney
- Timber Snow-ey, inspired by Portland Timbers mascot Timber Joey

Some of the submissions were related to entertainment and geography; Dana Haynes of Portland Tribune described the entries as "mostly corny". Submissions similar to Plowy McPlowface included Plowey McPlowfaces, Plowy McPlow Faces, Plowy McPlowfaces, and Snowy McPlowfaces. Members of the public voted for their five favorites from the finalists via an online ranked-choice ballot. After approximately 16,000 people voted, the winners (Beverly Clear-y, The Big Leplowski, Brrrrnside, Plowy McPlowface, and Salt & Thaw) were announced in February 2025.

PBOT unveiled the newly-named snowplows in October 2025, during the annual obstacle course training for drivers at Portland International Raceway. Beverly Clear-y was assigned to clear Northeast 33rd Avenue, near Beverly Cleary K-8 School and the surrounding neighborhood. The Big Leplowski (also reported as The Big Snoplowski) was assigned to clear the Southwest Hills and western part of Southwest Capitol Highway. Brrrrnside was tasked with clearing West Burnside Street and Swan Island. Plowy McPlowface and Salt & Thaw were assigned to clear downtown Portland and 82nd Avenue, respectively.

==== 2025–2026 season ====
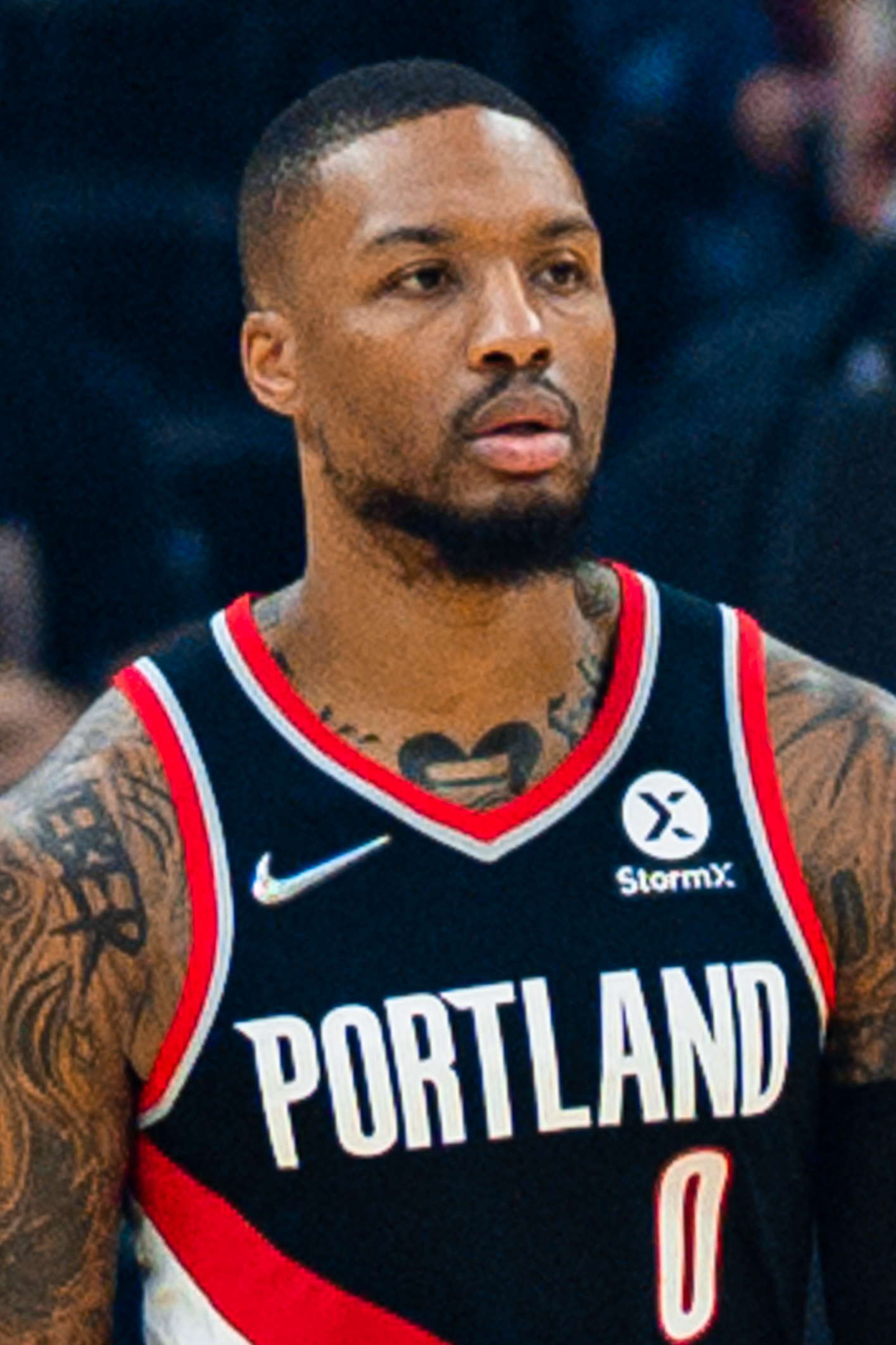
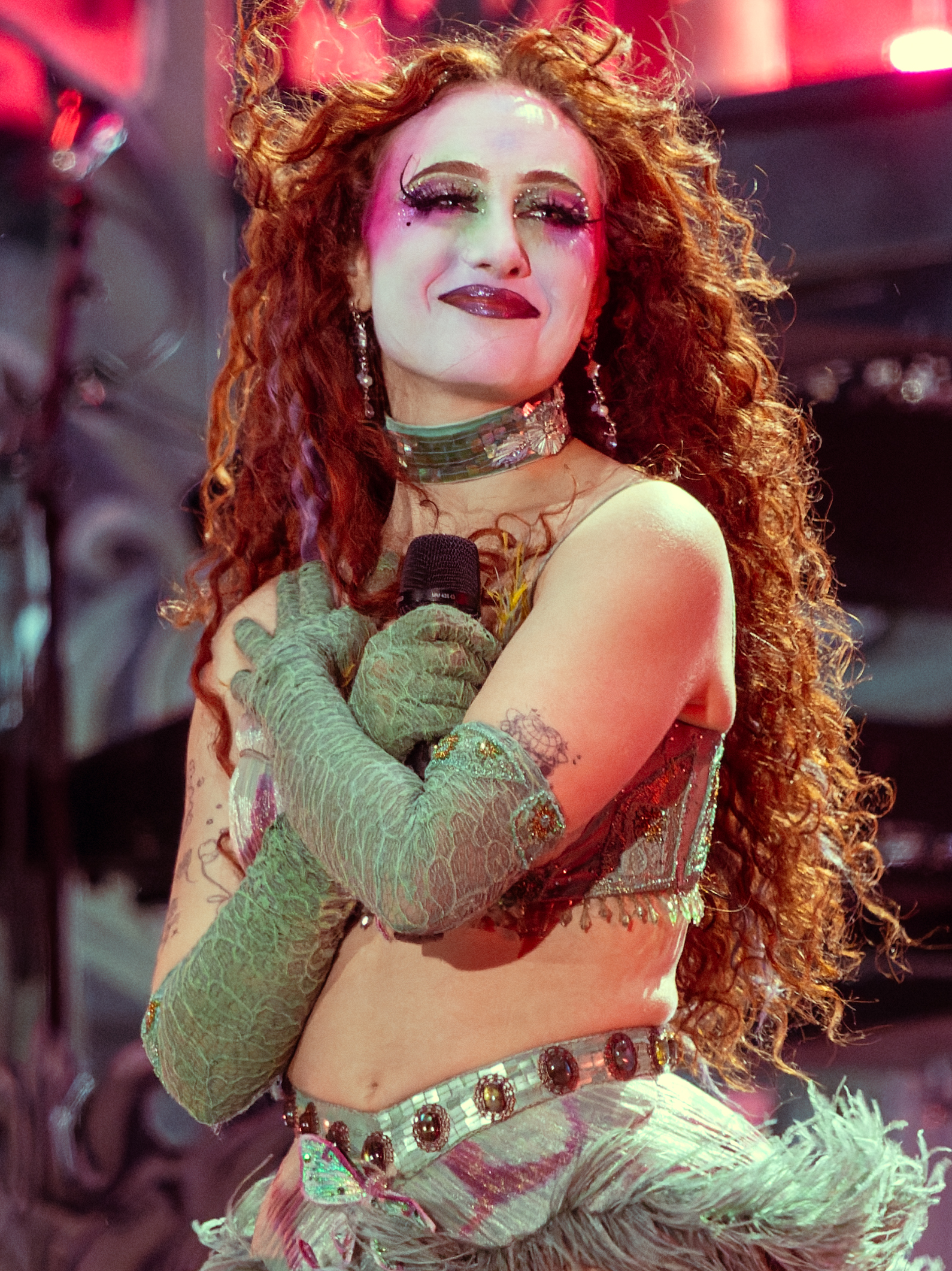
In 2026, two of the city's snowplows were named Damian Blizzard and Pink Pony Plow, inspired by Damian Lillard (left, pictured in 2021) of the Portland Trail Blazers and "Pink Pony Club" by Chappell Roan (right, pictured in 2025), respectively.

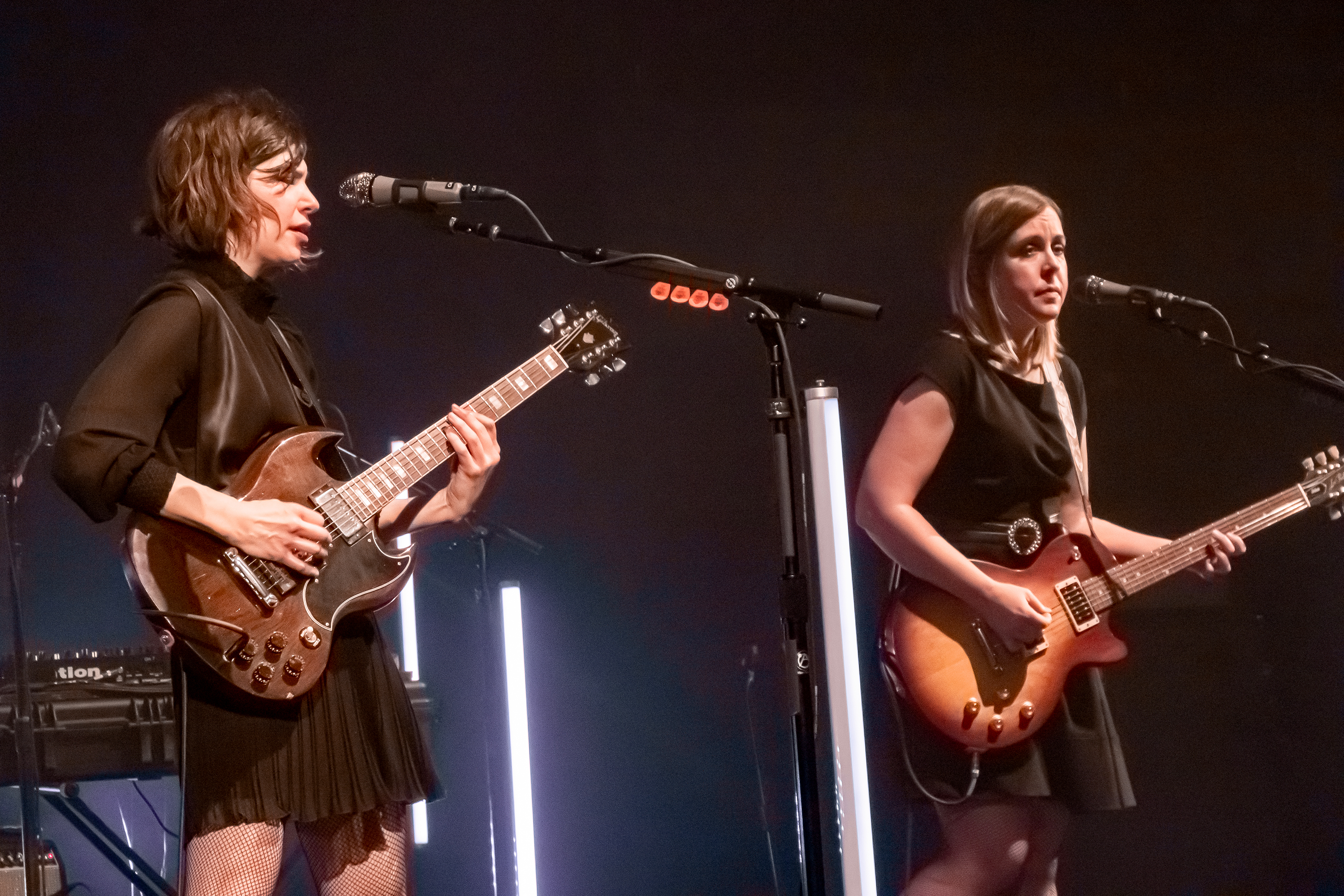
The name Sleeter-Kinney has been a finalist twice; the name refers to the rock band Sleater-Kinney (pictured left to right are members Carrie Brownstein and Corin Tucker performing in 2019).

External media
- PBOT unveils the names of their newest snow plows! on YouTube, KGW

In December 2025, PBOT invited the public to submit suggestions for the 51 unnamed snowplows, as part of a second naming contest. Approximately 3,300 suggestions were submitted. PBOT and the city's Elections Office selected twenty finalists, which were announced in January 2026. The twenty finalists were grouped into six themes: "beloved institutions", "local icons", "neighborhood nods", "pop-culture fun", "spins on familiar slogans", and "flat out random". Finalists included:

- Damian Blizzard, inspired by Damian Lillard of the Portland Trail Blazers
- Frogs Fighting Freezing Frost
- Froze City, inspired by the nickname "Rose City"
- The James Cleared Award, inspired by the James Beard Award
- Just Scraping By
- Keep Portland Cleared
- Ladd's Sedition, inspired by the historic district Ladd's Addition
- Mississlippy, inspired by Mississippi Avenue
- Mr. Plow
- Pink Pony Plow, inspired by the 2020 song "Pink Pony Club" by Chappell Roan
- Plowell Butte, inspired by Powell Butte
- Plowell's Books, inspired by Powell's Books
- Redacted
- Sandy Scraper
- Shiverrrrr Me Timbers!
- A Sleet-car Named De-icer, inspired by Tennessee Williams's 1947 play A Streetcar Named Desire
- Sleeter-Kinney
- Snow Seasons
- Ursula K. Le-Plow, inspired by author Ursula K. Le Guin
- We Only Ordered Rain

Voting via ranked choice ballot was open through January 25, 2026. Approximately 6,000 people cast votes to determine the winners, which were announced in February 2026. The winning submissions were Damian Blizzard, Keep Portland Cleared, Mississlippy, Pink Pony Plow, and A Sleetcar Named Deicer. Five snowplow drivers helped unveil the new names. Taylor Griggs of the Portland Mercury said "we wound up with references to the Blazers, Tennessee Williams, and Chappell Roan" and opined, "On second thought, I actually think those three interests go very well together, and may even sum up the Portland's vibe." The plows were unveiled in October 2026.

== Oregon Department of Transportation ==
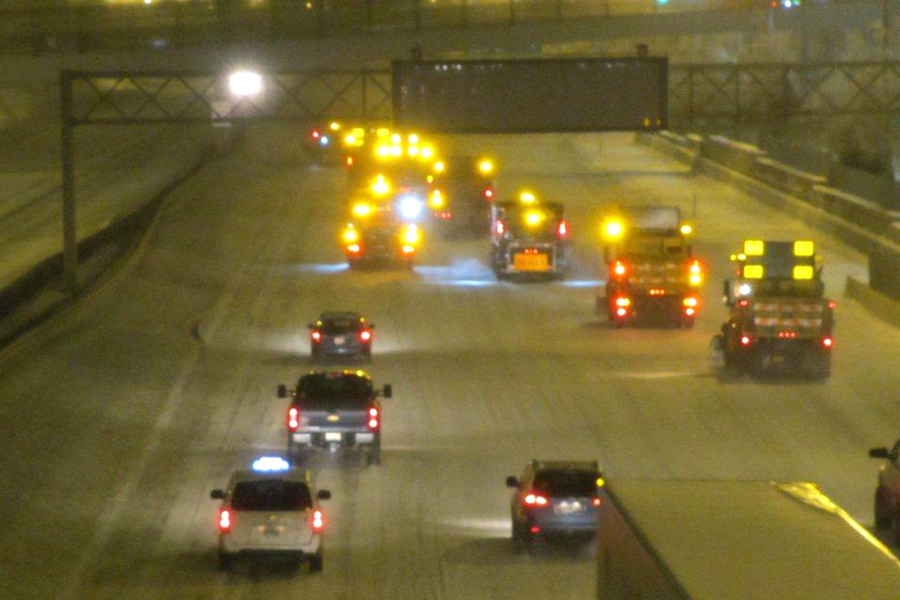
Snow removal operations by the Oregon Department of Transportation on I-205 at night, 2013

The Oregon Department of Transportation (ODOT) plows highways in the Portland metropolitan area.

In 2022, the family of a man who died after his vehicle went off the Glenn L. Jackson Memorial Bridge carrying Interstate 205 from Portland to Vancouver, Washington, filed a wrongful death lawsuit against ODOT for improper snowplowing. An investigation by KGW said ODOT "created conditions that may have contributed to the crash".

== See also ==
- Transportation in Portland, Oregon
