= Frog Ferry =

Planned ferry service in Oregon, US

Logo used by Friends of Frog Ferry

Frog Ferry is a planned ferry service in Portland, Oregon, United States.

The nonprofit organization Friends of Frog Ferry was established in 2017. It was fundraising, as of 2018. In 2020, the Portland Bureau of Transportation (PBOT) and the Oregon Department of Transportation (ODOT) awarded Friends of Frog Ferry with a $240,000 grant to completed a feasibility study. The campaign was paused in 2022. The organization relaunched a campaign in 2023. It announced an ownership campaign in April 2026.

Plans proposed seven ferries and nine stops along the Willamette River and Columbia River. The route would stretch from Oregon City to Vancouver, with stops in Lake Oswego and Milwaukie, as well as near the Oregon Museum of Science and Industry (OMSI) and the Moda Center in Portland. The City of Portland approved dock use in August 2025.
