= COVID-19 pandemic in Oregon =

- Disease: COVID-19
- Pathogen: SARS-CoV-2
- Location: Oregon
- Index case: Washington County
- Arrival date: February 28, 2020
- Confirmed cases: 967,156
- Hospitalized cases: 35,030 (cumulative)
- Deaths: 8,415

Government website
- govstatus.egov.com/OR-OHA-COVID-19 Received at least one vaccine dose: 2,890,214 (84.9% of population 18 and older); Vaccination Series in Progress: 299,253

The COVID-19 pandemic was confirmed to have reached the U.S. state of Oregon on February 28, 2020. On that day, Governor Kate Brown created a coronavirus response team; on March 8 she declared a state of emergency; and on March 23 she issued a statewide stay-at-home order with class C misdemeanor charges for violators.

In April 2020, Oregon joined Washington and California in the Western States Pact, an agreement to coordinate the restarting of economic activity while controlling the outbreak. By the end of June 2020, Governor Brown announced that face masks would be required indoors, effective July 1.

Economic impacts of COVID-19 in Oregon included stock market losses for major companies, reduced airline flights, losses for the food and entertainment industries, and closures of libraries and museums.

In early March 2020, universities and K–12 schools closed statewide, and began providing online instruction. Professional and college sports teams cancelled training, games, and tournaments.

By May 14, 2021, 31 of Oregon's 36 counties had met OHA requirements to enter the first phase of a three-phase process to reopen businesses.

As of September 1, 2022, 77.3% of the adult population has completed the primary vaccination series. 84.9% of the state's adult population has received at least one dose of a vaccine.

== Timeline ==
=== Early months ===
On February 28, 2020, the Oregon Health Authority (OHA) reported the first case of suspected coronavirus in a resident of Washington County who had not traveled to an infected area, likely indicating that the virus had been contracted within the community. Because he was identified as an employee at Forest Hills Elementary School in the Lake Oswego School District in adjacent Clackamas County, the school was closed for three days for deep cleaning. The case was confirmed as coronavirus by the Centers for Disease Control and Prevention (CDC) on March 3. On March 1, Oregon confirmed its second case, a household contact of its first case. The employee, later identified as the school building engineer, was treated with Remdesivir and was released from the hospital more than two months later.

On March 7, health officials identified four new presumptive positive cases among residents in Jackson, Klamath, and Washington counties. On March 8, the OHA added seven new presumptive positive cases to Oregon's count. On March 10, the OHA announced Multnomah County's first presumptive positive case, bringing Oregon's total to fifteen cases in seven counties. On March 11, OHA confirmed four new cases, one new case each in Deschutes, Marion, Polk, and Umatilla counties. They later announced Linn County's first two presumptive positive cases.

On March 16, 2020, Providence Health Systems, Kaiser Permanente, Legacy Health, and Oregon Health & Science University formed a coalition to set up a regional health system in the state in order to address anticipated need for capacity and coordination to address the outbreak.

Amid coronavirus outbreaks at nursing homes, including those run by Avamere, the company donated $20,000 to a PAC tied to Oregon governor Kate Brown.

42-year-old Vladislav V. Drozdek was arrested on March 23 trying to sell stolen N95 hospital masks in Beaverton. The masks were donated to local hospitals.

A study by the Oregon Health Authority found that 1% of subjects had developed COVID-19 antibodies. This is ten times the rate found via conventional testing. Between May 11 and June 15, 2020, 897 blood samples were collected. Of those, 9 contained antibodies.

=== Later events ===
In August and September 2021, despite wide availability of vaccines, the most severe wave of COVID-19 infections statewide caused Oregon hospitals to cancel elective procedures and degrade medical care for non-emergency patients. Approximately four out of five COVID-19 patients were unvaccinated, meaning most of the hospitalizations were preventable.

=== Cases ===
The Oregon Health Authority publishes weekly outbreak reports for COVID-19 cases, sorted by active and resolved cases in specific workplaces, senior care facilities, child care facilities, and K–12 schools. A detailed weekly data report covering clinical characteristics, demographics, weekly hospitalizations, and recovery time is also available.

An outbreak occurred at the 154-bed Edward C. Allworth Veterans' Home in Lebanon, Linn County. By March 16, 2020, the virus was confirmed in 13 residents (most over age 70) and one healthcare worker. With 151 residents and 225 workers, the county health director said, "I can't stop it. I can't stop the virus. I can't make test kits appear", but there was some optimism that the spread would be slow since the retirement home is divided into eleven housing units with 14 residents each. In 2016, the average resident age was 85, with an average length of stay being 50 days.

In Portland, Healthcare at Foster Creek (operating as St. Jude Operating Company with Melchor Balaz as its registered agent, part of Benicia Senior Living), had 119 cases and 29 deaths by mid-May 2020. The facility's first case was reported on March 24. An employee reported a lack of PPE to Oregon OSHA on March 26, though an Oregon Department of Human Services (DHS) investigation found it was "unsubstantiated for violations". Five deaths were reported in the week following the complaint. DHS and the facility agreed to a Letter of Intent for assistance on staffing and PPE, and the two signed with American Medical Response to assess and transport residents. DHS conducted a 3-day inspection beginning April 12; the facility had 10 deaths by then. On April 15, the inspection reported they "failed to ensure appropriate measures .. to prevent the spread of COVID-19", and that it "presents an immediate risk" to the patients and staff. DHS revoked new admissions at the facility, appointed a temporary management consultant, and inspected the facility daily. By April 16, there had been 50 cases and 14 deaths. On April 18, Oregon's Office of Emergency Management issued a partial evacuation order. DHS conducted a second significant survey of the facility beginning on April 24, and on April 28 CMS issued a "notice of involuntary termination" if the facility didn't correct its operating conditions by May 17. DHS had reports that coronavirus-positive staff were working in the facility, though not directly with patients. By May 5, there were 117 cases and 28 deaths; 55 patients had been sent to the hospital. Their fatalities were over half of all coronavirus fatalities in Portland. The facility's license was suspended on that date, effective immediately, meaning the facility was closed and the remaining 11 residents were evacuated by DHS.

Also in Portland, Laurelhurst Village, part of the Avamere senior care community, reported 48 cases with four deaths by May 12, 2020, up from 38 cases and four deaths by April 14. The cluster was publicized by The Oregonian on April 3, as DHS refused to publish counts until mid-April. On April 3, The Oregonian located 14 residents and 15 staff confirmed with COVID-19. On April 9, the facility opened 47 beds for coronavirus patients who had been released from a hospital as part of an Oregon Department of Human Services contract through the state. At least one complaint had been filed to OSHA on April 6.

Village Healthcare in Gresham had 36 cases and two deaths by April 30. Several staff complaints had been filed with OSHA.

Another large outbreak was at Salem's Prestige Senior Living Orchard Heights assisted living facility, having at least 41 cases and three deaths by May 12. The first case had been confirmed on April 30.

Salem Transitional Care, also part of Avamere, had 26 cases and three deaths by May 12, up from 5 cases and one death by April 14. The facility is licensed for 80 beds.

In early June, 124 cases were linked to Pacific Seafood in Newport, Oregon. Lincoln County (where Newport is located) became the first county in Oregon to make mask wearing mandatory on June 17.

In early June the Oregon State Penitentiary had 167 cases, and Townsend Farms in Fairview, Oregon had 51 cases.

The Lighthouse Pentecostal Church in Union County's Island City is the site of the largest outbreak in the state. By June 16 there were 236 cases linked to the church, out of 240 cases in the county. It was noted that the church held in-person services without social distancing or masks in April and as late as May 24, and the church had also held a wedding and a graduation, each attended by over 100 people. The May 24 service was announced on Facebook, stating "In accordance with President Trump, Lighthouse Church ... will be open. We will be having regular services as of Sunday 24, 2020". Union County commissioners Donna Beverage and Paul Anderes were part of a "secret meeting" by leaders of seven counties held on June 11 to make "battle plans" to reject the coronavirus restrictions put in place by the governor.

On June 23, 2020, 37 cases in Hermiston, Oregon were traced back to a food facility operated by Lamb Weston that will remain closed until further notice.

A cluster of 15 cases occurred among employees at the Oregon Beverage Recycling Cooperative's Eugene processing facility located in the same building as the BottleDrop redemption center on October 8, 2020.

On May 6, 2021, the Peoples Church in Salem, Oregon had 74 cases, including a Lead Pastor and his spouse being hospitalized with COVID-19. The church continued services within four days after the outbreak. The Peoples Church had previously joined a lawsuit against COVID-19 restrictions that "infringe on religious liberty far more than is necessary to preserve public health and safety,". By May 10, 2021, the church outbreak was resolved at 89 cases.

For the week ending August 25, 2021, the three largest active workplace clusters in Oregon were Amazon Troutdale (345 cases), Salem Hospital (299 cases), and Amazon Aumsville (185 cases). All three locations had been under investigation since May 2021.

=== Incidents by day ===
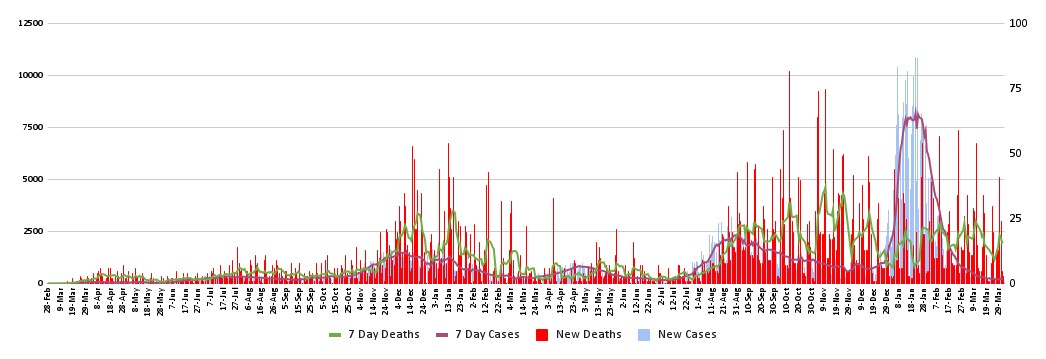
Lines show trend using a seven-day average. Chart shows data from February 28, 2020, to April 1, 2022.

The following table includes presumptive cases without confirmed tests and case adjustments.

Extended content

| Date | New Cases | Total Cases | New Deaths | Total Deaths | Doubling time of cases in days | Notes |
|---|---|---|---|---|---|---|
| Feb 28, 2020 | 1 | 1 | 0 | 0 | | Washington County (1) |
| Feb 29 | 0 | 1 | 0 | 0 | | |
| Mar 1 | 1 | 2 | 0 | 0 | | Washington County(1) |
| Mar 2 | 1 | 3 | 0 | 0 | | Umatilla County resident hospitalized in Walla Walla, WA. |
| Mar 3 | 0 | 3 | 0 | 0 | | |
| Mar 4 | 0 | 3 | 0 | 0 | | |
| Mar 5 | 0 | 3 | 0 | 0 | | |
| Mar 6 | 0 | 3 | 0 | 0 | | |
| Mar 7 | 4 | 7 | 0 | 0 | | Jackson (2), Klamath (1), Washington (1) counties. |
| Mar 8 | 7 | 14 | 0 | 0 | | 1 Douglas (1), Marion(1), Washington (5) counties. |
| Mar 9 | 0 | 14 | 0 | 0 | | |
| Mar 10 | 1 | 15 | 0 | 0 | | Multnomah County (1) |
| Mar 11 | 6 | 21 | 0 | 0 | | Deschutes (1), Polk (1), Marion (1), Umatilla (1) counties.; 2 Linn Co. |
| Mar 12 | 3 | 22 | 0 | 0 | | Clackamas(1), Washington(2) counties. |
| Mar 13 | 6 | 30 | 0 | 0 | 2.2 | Linn County (6) announced as of 8:13 pm. March 12. |
| Mar 14 | 6 | 36 | 1 | 1 | 3.8 | Deschutes(2), Linn(1), Washington(3) counties. 70-year-old man at VA Hospital in Multnomah Co. |
| Mar 15 | 3 | 39 | 0 | 1 | 8.7 | Deschutes(1), Linn(1), Yamhill(1) counties. |
| Mar 16 | 8 | 47 | 0 | 1' | 3.7 | Benton (2), Clackamas(1), Deschutes(2), Marion(1), Multnomah(1), Washington(1) counties. |
| Mar 17 | 18 | 65 | 0 | 1 | 2.1 | Clackamas (4), Linn (5), Marion (1), Multnomah (1) and Washington(7) counties. |
| Mar 18 | 10 | 75 | 2 | 3 | 4.8 | Benton (1), Lane (2), Marion (4), Washington, (2) and Yamhill (1) counties. 60-year-old woman from Lane County, dies Mar 14, confirmed positive for virus Mar 18 71-year-old man died at Providence St. Vincent Medical Center (Washington County resident) on March 17. Both of deceased had underlying medical conditions. |
| Mar 19 | 13 | 88 | 0 | 3 | 4.3 | Linn(2), Marion(5), Multnomah(4) and Washington(2) counties. |
| Mar 20 | 26 | 114 | 0 | 3 | 2.7 | Clackamas(4), Deschutes(2), Grant(1), Linn(1), Marion(4), Multnomah(5), Union(1), Washington(6), Yamhill(2) counties. |
| Mar 21 | 23 | 137 | 1 | 4 | 3.8 | Clackamas(1), Deschutes(1), Josephine(1), Lane(1), Marion(2), Multnomah(6), Washington(11) counties. 72 year old Marion County woman died March 20 at Kaiser Permanente Sunnyside Medical Center. She had underlying medical conditions. |
| Mar 22 | 24 | 161 | 1 | 5 | 4.3 | Death of man in 90s at Allworth Veterans' Home, had tested positive on Mar 11. |
| Mar 23 | 30 | 191 | 0 | 5 | | |
| Mar 24 | 18 | 209 | 3 | 8 | | Deaths: a 78-year-old Clackamas County man with underlying medical condition who died at Kaiser Sunnyside Medical Center on Sunday; a 63-year-old Multnomah County man who had underlying medical conditions and died at home Monday; and a 90-year-old Washington County woman with underlying medical conditions who died Monday at Providence St. Vincent Medical Center. |
| Mar 25 | 57 | 266 | 2 | 10 | | Deaths: an 80-year-old woman in Clackamas County who had underlying medical conditions, according to OHA. The state's 10th dead was a 73-year-old woman in Marion County who also had underlying medical conditions. |
| Mar 26 | 50 | 316 | 1 | 11 | | Death: a 69-year-old woman in Washington County. She had underlying medical conditions. |
| Mar 27 | 98 | 414 | 1 | 12 | | Death: an 82-year-old woman in Marion County who had underlying health conditions. |
| Mar 28 | 65 | 479 | 1 | 13 | | Death: a 93-year-old man in Yamhill County who had underlying health conditions. |
| Mar 29 | 69 | 548 | 0 | 13 | | |
| Mar 30 | 58 | 606 | 3 | 16 | | Deaths: all people with underlying health conditions over the age of 80. They were residents of Yamhill, Clackamas and Linn counties. The case in Linn county was a resident of the Oregon Veterans' Home in Lebanon. |
| Mar 31 | 84 | 690 | 2 | 18 | | Deaths: a 90-year-old man in Yamhill County and an 88-year-old woman in Benton County. Both people had underlying medical conditions. |
| Apr 1 | 46 | 736 | 1 | 19 | | Death: a 70-year-old woman in Multnomah County with underlying medical conditions. |
| Apr 2 | 90 | 826 | 2 | 21 | | Deaths: a 61-year-old man in Washington County and a 91-year-old woman in Marion County. Both people had underlying medical conditions. |
| Apr 3 | 73 | 899 | 1 | 22 | | Death: a 71-year-old man in Polk County who had underlying medical conditions. |
| Apr 4 | 100 | 999 | 4 | 26 | | Deaths: Three of the deaths were Multnomah County residents with underlying medical conditions, OHA said. They include a 59-year-old man, a 77-year-old woman and a 64-year-old woman. The fourth death was a 65-year-old Marion County man who also had underlying medical conditions. |
| Apr 5 | 69 | 1,068 | 1 | 27 | | Death: a 62-year-old Multnomah County woman tested positive on April 2 and died the same day in her residence. |
| Apr 6 | 64 | 1,132 | 2 | 29 | | Deaths: a 93-year-old male in Washington County, who tested positive on March 30 and died April 4, at Providence St. Vincent Medical Center and a 70-year-old female in Marion county, who tested positive on April 1 and died April 2, in her residence. They both had underlying medical conditions. |
| Apr 7 | 49 | 1,181 | 4 | 33 | | Deaths: an 83-year-old female in Marion County, a 98-year-old female in Marion County, a 71-year-old female in Marion County and a 91-year-old female in Washington County. They all had underlying medical conditions. |
| Apr 8 | 58 | 1,239 | 5 | 38 | | Deaths: an 88-year-old woman in Multnomah County, a 77-year-old man in Multnomah County, a 75-year-old woman in Multnomah County, a 94-year-old man in Yamhill County and a 90-year-old man in Yamhill County. They all had underlying medical conditions. |
| Apr 9 | 82 | 1,321 | 6 | 44 | | Deaths: a 74-year-old man in Linn County, a 97-year-old man in Linn County, an 87-year-old woman in Multnomah County, a 41-year-old woman in Multnomah County, a 66-year-old man in Multnomah County and a 74-year-old man in Benton County. They all had underlying medical conditions. |
| Apr 10 | 51 | 1,371 | 4 | 48 | | Deaths: a 74-year-old man in Multnomah County, an 81-year-old man in Multnomah County, a 69-year-old man in Multnomah County, an 83-year-old man in Multnomah County. They all had underlying medical conditions. |
| Apr 11 | 76 | 1,447 | 3 | 51 | | Deaths: a 94-year-old woman in Yamhill County, a 93-year-old woman in Multnomah County, an 81-year-old man in Josephine County. They all had underlying conditions. |
| Apr 12 | 80 | 1,527 | 1 | 52 | | Death: an 89-year-old woman in Multnomah County. She had underlying conditions. |
| Apr 13 | 57 | 1,584 | 1 | 53 | | Death: a 66-year-old Washington County resident. She had underlying medical conditions. |
| Apr 14 | 49 | 1,633 | 2 | 55 | | Deaths: a 71-year-old man in Multnomah County and an 88-year-old woman in Benton County. They both had had underlying medical conditions. |
| Apr 15 | 30 | 1,663 | 3 | 58 | | Deaths: an 82-year-old man in Marion County, an 84-year-old woman in Multnomah County and a 92-year-old woman in Multnomah County. They all had underlying medical conditions. |
| Apr 16 | 73 | 1,736 | 6 | 64 | | Deaths: an 84-year-old man in Multnomah County, a 56-year-old man in Multnomah County, a 78-year-old man in Multnomah County, a 69-year-old man in Multnomah County, a 74-year-old woman in Benton County and a 92-year-old man in Marion County. They all had underlying medical conditions. |
| Apr 17 | 49 | 1,785 | 6 | 70 | | Deaths: an 88-year-old woman in Clackamas County, a 95-year-old man in Linn County, an 86-year-old man in Linn County, a 65-year-old woman in Marion County, a 91-year-old woman in Marion County and a 76-year-old woman in Multnomah County. They all had underlying medical conditions. |
| Apr 18 | 59 | 1,844 | 2 | 72 | | Deaths: a 62-year-old man in Clackamas County and an 84-year-old man in Marion County. They both had underlying medical conditions. |
| Apr 19 | 66 | 1,910 | 2 | 74 | | Deaths: a 64-year-old man in Benton County and a 68-year-old man in Washington County. They both had underlying medical conditions. |
| Apr 20 | 47 | 1,956 | 1 | 75 | | Death: a 45-year-old man in Marion County, he had underlying medical conditions. |
| Apr 21 | 46 | 2,002 | 3 | 78 | | Deaths: a 47-year-old man in Washington County, a 61-year-old woman in Washington County and a 65-year-old man in Multnomah County. They all had underlying medical conditions. |
| Apr 22 | 57 | 2,059 | 0 | 78 | | Deaths: None |
| Apr 23 | 68 | 2,127 | 5 | 83 | | Deaths: a 94-year-old female in Multnomah County, a 78-year-old man in Multnomah County, an 87-year-old man in Multnomah County, a 74-year-old man in Multnomah County and a 70-year-old man in Clackamas County. The all had underlying medical conditions. |
| Apr 24 | 50 | 2,177 | 3 | 86 | | Deaths: an 86-year-old man in Multnomah County, an 80-year-old man in Multnomah County and an 89-year-old man in Linn County. They all had underlying medical conditions. |
| Apr 25 | 76 | 2,253 | 1 | 87 | | Death: a 59-year-old man in Lane County. He had underlying medical conditions. |
| Apr 26 | 58 | 2,311 | 4 | 91 | | Deaths: a 51-year-old man in Wasco County, a 70-year-old man in Multnomah County, a 75-year-old woman in Multnomah County and a 93-year-old woman in Marion County. They all had underlying medical conditions. |
| Apr 27 | 43 | 2,354 | 1 | 92 | | Death: a 91-year-old female in Washington County. She had underlying medical conditions. |
| Apr 28 | 31 | 2,385 | 7 | 99 | | Deaths: a 93-year-old female in Clackamas County, a 73-year-old man in Marion County, a 92-year-old man in Marion County, a 93-year-old female in Multnomah County, a 69-year-old female in Multnomah County, a 72-year-old man in Multnomah County and a 91-year-old man in Yamhill County. They all had underlying medical conditions. |
| Apr 29 | 61 | 2,446 | 2 | 101 | | Deaths: a 75-year-old man in Multnomah County and a 71-year-old female in Multnomah County. They both had underlying medical conditions. |
| Apr 30 | 64 | 2,510 | 2 | 103 | | Deaths: a 69-year-old man in Multnomah County, a 77-year-old man in Marion County. They both had underlying medical conditions. |
| May 1 | 69 | 2,579 | 1 | 104 | | Death: a 73-year-old man in Multnomah County. He had underlying medical conditions. |
| May 2 | 56 | 2,635 | 5 | 109 | | Deaths: a 64-year-old man from Polk County, a 70-year-old man from Multnomah County, a 75-year-old man from Multnomah County, a 91-year-old woman from Marion County and a 76-year-old woman from Umatilla County. They all had underlying medical conditions. |
| May 3 | 45 | 2,680 | 0 | 109 | | Death: None |
| May 4 | 79* | 2,759 | 0 | 109 | | Death: None *Includes 14 presumptive cases without confirmed tests. |
| May 5 | 80* | 2,839 | 4 | 113 | | Deaths: an 89-year-old man in Multnomah County, a 72-year-old man in Multnomah County and a 71-year-old man in Multnomah County, who all had underlying medical conditions. Also a 76-year-old man in Washington County. He had no known underlying medical conditions. *Includes an additional 8 presumptive cases without confirmed tests. |
| May 6 | 77* | 2,916 | 2 | 115 | | Deaths: an 88-year-old man in Multnomah County and a 95-year-old man in Polk County. They both had underlying medical conditions. *Includes an additional 7 presumptive cases without confirmed tests. |
| May 7 | 73* | 2,989 | 6 | 121 | | Deaths: an 84-year-old woman in Clackamas County, a 62-year-old man in Marion County, an 82-year-old woman in Marion County, an 80-year-old man in Multnomah County, a 71-year-old woman in Multnomah County and a 69-year-old woman in Polk County. They all had had underlying medical conditions. *Includes an additional 3 presumptive cases without confirmed tests. |
| May 8 | 79* | 3,068 | 3 | 124 | | Deaths: a 51-year-old man in Marion County, an 80-year-old woman in Marion County and a 71-year-old woman in Multnomah County. They all had underlying medical conditions. *Includes an additional 5 presumptive cases without confirmed tests. |
| May 9 | 92* | 3,160 | 3 | 127 | | Deaths: a 76-year-old woman in Clackamas County, an 81-year-old man in Linn County and a 92-year-old woman in Polk County. They all had underlying medical conditions. *Includes an additional 13 presumptive cases without confirmed tests. |
| May 10 | 68* | 3,228 | 0 | 127 | | Deaths: none. *Includes an additional 8 presumptive cases without confirmed tests. |
| May 11 | 58* | 3,286 | 3 | 130 | | Deaths: a 91-year-old man in Polk County. He had underlying medical conditions. A 64-year-old man in Umatilla County. It is unknown at this time if he had underlying medical conditions. A 77-year-old woman in Washington County. She had no known underlying medical conditions. *Includes an additional 7 presumptive cases without confirmed tests. |
| May 12 | 72* | 3,358 | 0 | 130 | | Deaths: None. *Includes an additional 11 presumptive cases without confirmed tests. |
| May 13 | 58* | 3,416 | 4 | 134 | | Deaths: a 91-year-old man in Polk County, a 100-year-old woman in Polk County, a 90-year-old woman in Polk County and a 91-year-old woman in Washington County. They all had underlying medical conditions. *Includes an additional 4 presumptive cases without confirmed tests. |
| May 14 | 63 | 3,479 | 3 | 137 | | Deaths: a 66-year-old man in Multnomah County, a 61-year-old man in Multnomah County and a 66-year-old man in Washington County. They all had underlying medical conditions. |
| May 15 | 62* | 3,541 | 0 | 137 | | Deaths: None. *Includes an additional 1 presumptive case without confirmed tests. |
| May 16 | 71* | 3,612 | 0 | 137 | | Deaths: None. *Includes an additional 7 presumptive cases without confirmed tests. |
| May 17 | 12* | 3,623 | 0 | 137 | | Deaths: None. *Includes an additional 3 presumptive cases without confirmed tests. |
| May 18 | 64* | 3,687 | 1 | 138 | | Deaths: a 69-year-old man in Marion County. He had underlying medical conditions. *Includes an additional 2 presumptive cases without confirmed tests. |
| May 19 | 39* | 3,726 | 2 | 140 | | Deaths: a 70-year-old woman in Umatilla County and a 69-year-old man in Linn County. They both had underlying medical conditions. *Includes an additional 8 presumptive cases without confirmed tests and removes two previous presumptive cases that were found not to be COVID-19. |
| May 20 | 75* | 3,801 | 4 | 144 | | Deaths: a 94-year-old woman in Washington County, a 90-year-old man in Washington County, a 75-year-old woman in Multnomah County and a 58-year-old woman in Multnomah County. They all had underlying medical conditions. *Includes an additional 10 presumptive cases without confirmed tests and removes two previous presumptive cases that were found not to be COVID-19. |
| May 21 | 24 | 3,817 | 1 | 145 | | Death: a 93-year-old woman in Polk County. She had underlying medical conditions. There were consolidations to previous numbers as some previously presumptive cases were found not to be COVID-19. |
| May 22 | 47* | 3,864 | 2 | 147 | | Deaths: a 53-year-old man in Marion County and an 83-year-old man in Multnomah County. They both had underlying medical conditions. *Includes an additional 3 presumptive cases without confirmed tests and removes one previous presumptive case that was found not to be COVID-19. |
| May 23 | 35* | 3,888 | 0 | 147 | | Deaths: None. *Includes an additional 7 presumptive cases without confirmed tests and removes 3 previous cases that were found not to be COVID-19. Note that this entry only reflects a 16-hour period instead of the normal 24. The reporting deadline has changed from 8:00 AM to 12:01 AM. |
| May 24 | 46* | 3,927 | 1 | 148 | | Deaths: a 93-year-old woman in Clackamas County. She had underlying medical conditions. *Includes an additional 3 presumptive cases without confirmed tests and removes some previous cases that were found not to be COVID-19. |
| May 25 | 23* | 3,949 | 0 | 148 | | Deaths: None. *Includes an additional 4 presumptive cases without confirmed tests and removes a previous case that was found not to be COVID-19. |
| May 26 | 18* | 3,967 | 0 | 148 | | Deaths: None. *Includes an additional 1 presumptive cases without confirmed tests and removes a previous case that was found not to be COVID-19. |
| May 27 | 71* | 4,038 | 0 | 148 | | Deaths: None. *Includes presumptive cases without confirmed tests. |
| May 28 | 49* | 4,086 | 3 | 151 | | Deaths: a 73-year-old woman in Clackamas County, a 73-year-old man in Multnomah County, a 72-year-old man in Polk County and a 72-year-old man in Polk County. They all had underlying conditions. *Includes presumptive cases without confirmed tests and a removal due to a duplicated case. |
| May 29 | 48* | 4,131 | 0 | 151 | | Deaths: None. *Includes presumptive cases without confirmed tests and removals due to updated info. |
| May 30 | 54* | 4,185 | 2 | 153 | | Deaths: a 62-year-old man in Lane County and a 93-year-old woman in Polk County. They both had underlying medical conditions. *Includes presumptive cases without confirmed tests and removals due to updated info. |
| May 31 | 58* | 4,243 | 0 | 153 | | Deaths: None. *Includes presumptive cases without confirmed tests and removals due to updated info. |
| June 1 | 59* | 4,302 | 1 | 154 | | Deaths: a 59-year-old man in Marion County. He had underlying medical conditions. *Includes presumptive cases without confirmed tests. |
| June 2 | 33* | 4,335 | 3 | 157 | | Deaths: a 36-year-old woman in Multnomah County, a 66-year-old woman in Multnomah County and an 81-year-old woman in Washington County. They all had underlying medical conditions. *Includes presumptive cases without confirmed tests. |
| June 3 | 65 | 4,399 | 2 | 159 | | Deaths: a 68-year-old male in Clackamas County and a 60-year-old male in Multnomah County. They both had underlying medical conditions. |
| June 4 | 76 | 4,474 | 0 | 159 | | Deaths: None. |
| June 5 | 97 | 4,570 | 2 | 161 | | Deaths: a 63-year-old man in Multnomah County and a 96-year-old woman in Marion County. They both had underlying medical conditions. |
| June 6 | 93 | 4,662 | 2 | 163 | | Deaths: a 70-year-old woman in Multnomah County and a 50-year-old man in Multnomah County. They both had underlying medical conditions. |
| June 7 | 146 | 4,808 | 1 | 164 | | Deaths: a 71-year-old man in Malheur County. Additional information is still pending. |
| June 8 | 114 | 4,922 | 0 | 164 | | Deaths: None. |
| June 9 | 70 | 4,988 | 5 | 169 | | Deaths: a 78-year-old man in Multnomah County, a 96-year-old man in Marion County, a 70-year-old man in Marion County, a 60-year-old man in Marion County and a 96-year-old man in Clackamas County. The all had underlying medical conditions. |
| June 10 | 72 | 5,060 | 0 | 169 | | Deaths: None. |
| June 11 | 178 | 5,237 | 2 | 171 | | Deaths: an 84-year-old woman in Clackamas County and a 66-year-old man in Yamhill County. They both had underlying medical conditions. |
| June 12 | 142 | 5,377 | 2 | 173 | | Deaths: a 96-year-old man in Washington County, who did not have underlying medical conditions and a 68-year-old man in Multnomah County, who had underlying medical conditions. |
| June 13 | 158 | 5,535 | 1 | 174 | | Deaths: an 87-year-old man in Umatilla County. He had underlying medical conditions. |
| June 14 | 101 | 5,636 | 2 | 176 | | Deaths: a 95-year-old woman in Multnomah Count, who had underlying medical conditions, and a 70-year-old woman in Washington County, who did not have underlying medical conditions. |
| June 15 | 184 | 5,820 | 4 | 180 | | Deaths: a 78-year-old woman in Clackamas County, an 85-year-old man in Clackamas County, a 65-year-old woman in Clackamas County and a 75-year-old woman in Clackamas County. They all had underlying medical conditions. |
| June 16 | 278 | 6,098 | 2 | 182 | | Deaths: an 89-year-old man in Clackamas County and an 85-year-old woman in Marion County. They both had underlying medical conditions. |
| June 17 | 122 | 6,218 | 1 | 183 | | Deaths: a 95-year-old woman in Clackamas County. She had underlying medical conditions. |
| June 18 | 148 | 6,366 | 4 | 187 | | Deaths: an 82-year-old woman in Marion County, a 78-year-old man in Marion County, an 89-year-old man in Clackamas County and an 87-year-old man in Clackamas County. They all had underlying medical conditions. |
| June 19 | 206 | 6,572 | 1 | 188 | | Deaths: an 84-year-old woman in Marion County. She had underlying medical conditions. |
| June 20 | 178 | 6,750 | 1 | 189 | | Deaths: a 53-year-old man in Morrow County. He had underlying medical conditions. |
| June 21 | 190 | 6,937 | 1 | 190 | | Deaths: a 93-year-old woman in Clackamas County. She had underlying medical conditions. |
| June 22 | 146 | 7,083 | 2 | 192 | | Deaths: a 68-year-old man in Lincoln County who had underlying medical conditions and a 90-year-old woman in Marion County whose underlying medical conditions is unknown at this time. |
| June 23 | 191 | 7,274 | 0 | 192 | | Deaths: None. |
| June 24 | 171 | 7,444 | 3 | 195 | | Deaths: a 63-year-old man in Lincoln County who did not have underlying medical conditions, a 78-year-old man in Clackamas County and an 87-year-old woman in Marion County. The last two had underlying conditions. |
| June 25 | 124 | 7,568 | 2 | 197 | | Deaths: an 83-year-old woman in Marion County and an 83-year-old man in Marion County. They both had underlying conditions. |
| June 26 | 250 | 7,818 | 4 | 201 | | Deaths: a 96-year-old woman in Marion County, a 90-year-old man in Marion County, a 79-year-old woman in Marion County, a 90-year-old woman in Union County, all of whom had underlying conditions, and a 74-year-old woman in Morrow County. Additional information about this latest COVID-19 related death is still pending. An update will be provided when we have additional information. |
| June 27 | 277 | 8,094 | 1 | 202 | | Deaths: an 84-year-old man in Multnomah County. He had underlying medical conditions. |
| June 28 | 247 | 8,341 | 0 | 202 | | Deaths: None. |
| June 29 | 146 | 8,485 | 2 | 204 | | Deaths: an 84-year-old woman in Marion County and a 72-year-old man in Marion County. They both had underlying medical conditions. |
| June 30 | 181 | 8,656 | 3 | 207 | | Deaths: a 74-year-old man in Marion County, a 93-year-old man in Marion County and a 66-year-old woman in Marion County. They all had underlying medical conditions. |
| July 1 | 281 | 8,931 | 1 | 208 | | Deaths: a 91-year-old woman in Marion County. She had underlying medical conditions. |
| July 2 | 375 | 9,294 | 1 | 209 | | Deaths: a 73-year-old woman in Klamath County. She had underlying medical conditions. |
| July 3 | 344 | 9,636 | 0 | 209 | | Deaths: None. |
| July 4 | 303 | 9,930 | 4 | 213 | | Deaths: a 93-year-old man in Umatilla County, a 74-year-old man in Umatilla County, a 94-year-old woman in Clackamas County and an 86-year-old woman in Lincoln County. They all had underlying medical conditions except the last one, where conditions are being confirmed. |
| July 5 | 301 | 10,230 | 2 | 215 | | Deaths: a 96-year-old woman in Lincoln County and a 70-year-old man in Marion County. They both had underlying medical conditions. |
| July 6 | 168 | 10,395 | 0 | 215 | | Deaths: None. |
| July 7 | 218 | 10,605 | 5 | 220 | | Deaths: a 93-year-old man in Multnomah County, a 74-year-old woman in Yamhill County, a 56-year-old woman in Linn County, an 80-year-old man in Marion County and a 62-year-old woman in Marion County. They all had underlying medical conditions. |
| July 8 | 212 | 10,817 | 4 | 224 | | Deaths: an 85-year-old woman in Benton County, a 55-year-old man in Multnomah County, a 91-year-old woman in Marion County and a 36-year-old man in Multnomah County. They all had underlying medical conditions. |
| July 9 | 389 | 11,188 | 6 | 230 | | Deaths: a 63-year-old woman in Crook County, an 83-year-old man in Umatilla County, a 71-year-old man in Marion County, a 75-year-old woman in Clackamas County, a 78-year-old woman in Clackamas County (more details pending) and a 90-year-old man in Marion County. They almost all had underlying medical conditions. |
| July 10 | 275 | 11,454 | 2 | 232 | | Deaths: a 62-year-old man in Union County and a 99-year-old woman in Lincoln County. They both had underlying medical conditions. |
| July 11 | 409 | 11,851 | 0 | 232 | | Deaths: None. |
| July 12 | 332 | 12,170 | 2 | 234 | | Deaths: an 86-year-old woman in Malheur County had underlying conditions and a 93-year-old woman in Washington County. Additional details are still being confirmed. |
| July 13 | 280 | 12,438 | 3 | 237 | | Deaths: a 67-year-old man in Marion County, a 76-year-old man in Clackamas County and a 54-year-old man in Umatilla County. They all had underlying conditions. |
| July 14 | 380 | 12,805 | 7 | 244 | | Deaths: an 86-year-old woman in Marion County, a 77-year-old man in Clackamas County, an 81-year-old woman in Wasco County, a 91-year-old man in Lincoln County, a 77-year-old woman in Marion County, a 70-year-old man in Malheur County and a 95-year-old woman in Lincoln County. Her place of death is being confirmed. They all had underlying medical conditions. |
| July 15 | 282 | 13,081 | 4 | 247 | | Deaths: a 63-year-old man in Deschutes County, a 61-year-old man in Multnomah County, an 85-year-old woman in Multnomah County and a 61-year-old woman in Douglas County. They all had underlying medical conditions. |
| July 16 | 437 | 13,509 | 2 | 249 | | Deaths: a 97-year-old man in Malheur County. He had underlying conditions. Also a 58-year-old woman in Malheur County, underlying conditions are being confirmed. |
| July 17 | 307 | 13,802 | 5 | 254 | | Deaths: a 77-year-old man in Wasco County, a 72-year-old man in Umatilla County, a 99-year-old man in Marion County, an 82-year-old woman in Clackamas County and a 35-year-old woman in Multnomah County. All except the man from Umatilla County had underlying medical conditions. |
| July 18 | 353 | 14,149 | 3 | 257 | | Deaths: a 78-year-old man in Marion County, additional details are still being confirmed, a 60-year-old man in Wallowa County and an 81-year-old man in Lincoln County. The last two had underlying conditions. |
| July 19 | 436 | 14,579 | 3 | 260 | | Deaths: a 90-year-old woman in Marion County, an 80-year-old man in Marion County and a 62-year-old woman in Multnomah County. They all had underlying conditions. |
| July 20 | 277 | 14,847 | 2 | 262 | | Deaths: a 76-year-old man in Marion County and a 92-year-old man in Marion County. They both had underlying conditions. |
| July 21 | 299 | 15,139 | 7 | 269 | | Deaths: an 88-year-old woman in Clackamas County, an 88-year-old woman in Malheur County, a 52-year-old man in Multnomah County, a 59-year-old man in Washington County, an 88-year-old man in Clackamas County, an 87-year-old man in Clackamas County and a 47-year-old man in Umatilla County. Most had underlying conditions. |
| July 22 | 264 | 15,393 | 2 | 271 | | Deaths: a 77-year-old man in Umatilla County and an 82-year-old man in Umatilla County. They both had underlying conditions. |
| July 23 | 331 | 15,713 | 2 | 273 | | Deaths: a 74-year-old man in Umatilla County and a 79-year-old woman in Marion County. They both had underlying conditions. |
| July 24 | 396 | 16,104 | 9 | 282 | | Deaths: an 61-year-old woman in Multnomah County, an 68-year-old woman in Clackamas County, a 92-year-old man in Deschutes County, a 96-year-old man in Deschutes County, an 90-year-old woman in Malheur County, a 74-year-old man in Marion County, an 62-year-old woman in Multnomah County, an 87-year-old woman in Umatilla County, and a 69-year-old man in Umatilla County. They all had underlying conditions. |
| July 25 | 408 | 16,492 | 4 | 286 | | Deaths: a 66-year-old man in Multnomah County, an 88-year-old man in Multnomah County, an 87-year-old man in Multnomah County, and an 85-year-old man in Umatilla County. They all had underlying conditions. |
| July 26 | 277 | 16,758 | 3 | 289 | | Deaths: an 40-year-old woman in Multnomah County, a 56-year-old man in Marion County and an 63-year-old woman in Malheur County. They all had underlying conditions. |
| July 27 | 340 | 17,088 | 0 | 289 | | Deaths: None. |
| July 28 | 342 | 17,416 | 14 | 303 | | Deaths: a 77-year-old male in Multnomah County, a 79-year-old male in Multnomah County, a 77-year-old female in Jefferson County, a 94-year-old female in Clackamas County, a 54-year-old male in Malheur County, a 26-year-old male in Yamhill County, a 91-year-old female in Clackamas County, an 88-year-old male in Deschutes County, a 78-year-old female in Deschutes County, a 64-year-old female in Jefferson County, an 82-year-old female in Jefferson County, an 87-year-old male in Marion County, a 66-year-old female in Marion County and an 84-year-old female in Umatilla County. They all either had underlying conditions or underlying conditions are not yet known. |
| July 29 | 304 | 17,721 | 8 | 311 | | Deaths: a 72-year-old man in Multnomah County, a 90-year-old woman in Multnomah County, a 94-year-old woman in Umatilla, an 87-year-old woman in Umatilla County, an 85-year-old woman in Morrow County, a 65-year-old man in Jackson County, a 79-year-old woman in Multnomah County and a 73-year-old woman in Umatilla County. They all had underlying conditions. |
| July 30 | 416 | 18,121 | 5 | 316 | | Deaths: a 78-year-old man in Umatilla County, an 85-year-old man in Multnomah County, a 68-year-old woman in Umatilla County, a 66-year-old man in Multnomah County and an 82-year-old man in Multnomah County. They all had underlying conditions. |
| July 31 | 373 | 18,492 | 6 | 322 | | Deaths: a 90-year-old woman in Deschutes County, an 81-year-old man in Deschutes County, a 55-year-old man in Multnomah County, a 58-year-old man in Umatilla County, a 70-year-old man in Multnomah County and an 81-year-old man in Lincoln County. They all had underlying conditions. |
| August 1 | 330 | 18,817 | 3 | 325 | | Deaths: an 86-year-old man in Washington County, a 73-year-old woman in Yamhill County and a 91-year-old woman in Deschutes County. They all had underlying conditions. |
| August 2 | 285 | 19,097 | 1 | 326 | | Deaths: a 68-year-old man in Malheur County. He had underlying conditions. |
| August 3 | 272 | 19,366 | 2 | 328 | | Deaths: a 71-year-old man in Marion County and a 50-year-old man in Multnomah County. Both had underlying conditions. |
| August 4 | 342 | 19,699 | 5 | 333 | | Deaths: an 89-year-old woman in Malheur County, an 88-year-old woman in Yamhill County, an 87-year-old man in Clackamas County, an 88-year-old man in Morrow County and a 96-year-old woman in Malheur County. Presence of underlying conditions is being confirmed the last, the others all had underlying conditions. |
| August 5 | 299 | 19,979 | 5 | 338 | | Deaths: an 87-year-old woman in Clackamas County, a 74-year-old man in Umatilla County, a 74-year-old man in Umatilla County, a 67-year-old man in Washington County and an 83-year-old man in Josephine County. They each had underlying conditions. |
| August 6 | 267 | 20,225 | 1 | 339 | | Deaths: an 83-year-old man in Umatilla County. He had underlying conditions. |
| August 7 | 423 | 20,636 | 9 | 348 | | Deaths: a 90-year-old man in Clackamas County, an 80-year-old woman in Deschutes County, an 80-year-old man in Jackson County, a 75-year-old man in Jefferson County, a 64-year-old man in Klamath County, an 88-year-old man in Malheur County, a 75-year-old man in Marion County, a 94-year-old man in Umatilla County and a 93-year-old woman in Yamhill County. They each had underlying conditions or those conditions are being confirmed. |
| August 8 | 376 | 21,010 | 7 | 355 | | Deaths: a 74-year-old man in Washington County, an 83-year-old man in Marion County, a 47-year-old man in Umatilla County, a 77-year-old man in Clackamas County, an 80-year-old man in Deschutes County, an 85-year-old man in Multnomah County and a 41-year-old man in Malheur County. They each had underlying conditions or those conditions are being confirmed. |
| August 9 | 263 | 21,272 | 1 | 356 | | Deaths: a 72-year-old man in Multnomah County. He had underlying conditions. |
| August 10 | 227 | 21,488 | 1 | 357 | | Deaths: an 88-year-old man in Multnomah County. He had underlying conditions. |
| August 11 | 302 | 21,774 | 11* | 368 | | Deaths: a 59-year-old man in Marion County, a 105-year-old woman in Clackamas County, a 93-year-old woman in Umatilla County, a 78-year-old woman in Marion County, a 71-year-old woman in Umatilla County, a 79-year-old man in Multnomah County, a 75-year-old man in Linn County, a 66-year-old man in Clackamas County, a 77-year-old man in Multnomah County, a 78-year-old man in Clackamas County and an 82-year-old man in Marion County. Most had underlying conditions. *During data reconciliation of death certificates by OHA additional COVID-19 related deaths may be found and reported. The deaths reported today include eight deaths that were identified during the most recent review process. |
| August 12 | 258 | 22,022 | 7 | 375 | | Deaths: a 76-year-old man in Umatilla County, a 95-year-old woman in Washington County, a 70-year-old man in Clackamas County, an 81-year-old man in Clackamas County, an 86-year-old woman in Washington County, a 57-year-old woman in Clackamas County and an 81-year-old man in Clackamas County. They all had underlying conditions. |
| August 13 | 294 | 22,300 | 8 | 383 | | Deaths: an 83-year-old woman in Malheur County, a 75-year-old man in Multnomah County, an 80-year-old woman in Clackamas County, an 81-year-old man in Clackamas County, an 85-year-old man in Deschutes County, a 55-year-old man in Columbia County, a 78-year-old woman in Multnomah County and an 84-year-old man in Multnomah County. They all either had underlying conditions or the conditions are currently unknown. |
| August 14 | 323 | 22,613 | 2 | 385 | | Deaths: a 73-year-old woman in Lane County and an 85-year-old man in Umatilla County. They both had underlying conditions. |
| August 15 | 412 | 23,018 | 1 | 386 | | Deaths: a 71-year-old man in Jefferson County. He had underlying conditions. |
| August 16 | 252 | 23,262 | 2 | 388 | | Deaths: an 86-year-old woman in Clackamas County and a 52-year-old woman in Multnomah County. They both had underlying conditions. |
| August 17 | 192 | 23,451 | 0 | 388 | | Deaths: None. |
| August 18 | 237 | 23,676 | 9 | 397 | | Deaths: a 63-year-old man in Washington County, an 88-year-old woman in Washington County, a 90-year-old man in Clackamas County, an 82-year-old man in Clackamas County, a 75-year-old man in Jefferson County, a 97-year-old woman in Lincoln County, a 90-year-old man in Lincoln County, a 63-year-old man in Malheur County and a 69-year-old woman in Washington County. They all either had underlying conditions or the conditions are currently unknown. |
| August 19 | 203 | 23,870 | 11 | 408 | | Deaths: a 70-year-old woman in Multnomah County, an 83-year-old woman in Polk County, a 99-year-old woman in Washington County, a 93-year-old woman in Multnomah County, a 90-year-old woman in Multnomah County, a 73-year-old woman in Multnomah County, an 84-year-old man in Clackamas County, a 60-year-old man in Multnomah County, an 88-year-old man in Clackamas County, a 94-year-old man in Clackamas County and an 86-year-old woman in Multnomah County. They all had underlying conditions. |
| August 20 | 301 | 24,165 | 4 | 412 | | Deaths: an 86-year-old man in Washington County, an 82-year-old woman in Baker County, an 80-year-old man in Douglas County and a 60-year-old man in Linn County. They all had underlying conditions. |
| August 21 | 259 | 24,421 | 2 | 414 | | Deaths: a 79-year-old man in Lane County and a 96-year-old woman in Marion County. They both had underlying conditions. |
| August 22 | 302 | 24,710 | 3 | 417 | | Deaths: A 60-year-old man in Marion County, a 37-year-old woman in Multnomah County, and a 98-year-old female in Yamhill County. They all have underlying conditions. |
| August 23 | 237 | 24,937 | 0 | 417 | | Deaths: None. |
| August 24 | 220 | 25,155 | 3 | 420 | | Deaths: an 87-year-old woman in Washington County, a 77-year-old man in Washington County and a 73-year-old woman in Washington County. They all had underlying conditions. |
| August 25 | 247 | 25,391 | 7 | 427 | | Deaths: a 93-year-old woman in Lincoln County, a 63-year-old man in Umatilla County, a 71-year-old woman in Umatilla County, a 68-year-old man in Marion County, an 87-year-old woman in Lincoln County, a 66-year-old man in Umatilla County and a 93-year-old woman in Multnomah County. They all had underlying conditions. |
| August 26 | 222 | 25,571 | 6 | 433 | | Deaths: a 90-year-old man in Baker County, a 92-year-old woman in Multnomah County, a 55-year-old man in Jefferson County, an 82-year-old woman in Multnomah County, a 55-year-old woman in Marion County and a 62-year-old man in Multnomah County. They all had underlying conditions. |
| August 27 | 212 | 25,761 | 5 | 438 | | Deaths: a 74-year-old man in Malheur County, an 82-year-old man in Washington County, an 80-year-old woman in Washington County, a 97-year-old woman in Washington County and a 90-year-old man in Washington County. They all had underlying conditions. |
| August 28 | 301 | 26,054 | 9 | 447 | | Deaths: an 84-year-old man in Marion County, a 50-year-old man in Washington County, a 73-year-old man in Umatilla County, a 54-year-old man in Umatilla County, a 94-year-old man in Polk County, a 73-year-old woman in Malheur County, a 78-year-old man in Multnomah County, a 97-year-old woman in Malheur County and a 29-year-old man in Multnomah County. All except the last had underlying conditions. |
| August 29 | 252 | 26,293 | 7 | 454 | | Deaths: a 66-year-old man in Multnomah County, a 37-year-old woman in Washington County, a 59-year-old woman in Multnomah County, a 68-year-old woman in Multnomah County, an 86-year-old man in Lane County, a 69-year-old man in Washington County and a 78-year-old man in Clackamas County. They all had underlying conditions. |
| August 30 | 269 | 26,554 | 4 | 458 | | Deaths: a 70-year-old woman in Douglas County, a 79-year-old woman in Marion County, an 88-year-old man in Washington County and a 79-year-old man in Marion County. They all had underlying conditions. |
| August 31 | 162 | 26,713 | 1 | 459 | | Deaths: a 93-year-old man in Washington County. He had underlying conditions. |
| September 1 | 243 | 26,946 | 6 | 465 | | Deaths: a 41-year-old man in Washington County, an 86-year-old woman in Linn County, a 66-year-old man in Umatilla County, a 27-year-old man in Washington County, a 91-year-old man in Multnomah County and an 88-year-old woman in Multnomah County. They all had underlying conditions. |
| September 2 | 140 | 27,075 | 3 | 468 | | Deaths: a 71-year-old woman in Polk County, a 73-year-old man in Jackson County and an 84-year-old man in Washington County. They all had underlying conditions. |
| September 3 | 274 | 27,336 | 3 | 470 | | Deaths: a 79-year-old man in Malheur County, a 56-year-old man in Washington County and a 96-year-old woman in Marion County. They all had underlying conditions. |
| September 4 | 268 | 27,601 | 5 | 475 | | Deaths: a 43-year-old man in Clackamas County, a 52-year-old man in Multnomah County, a 73-year-old man in Multnomah County, a 56-year-old woman in Washington County and an 87-year-old woman in Multnomah County. They all had underlying conditions. |
| September 5 | 261 | 27,856 | 5 | 480 | | Deaths: a 53-year-old man in Marion County, an 80-year-old woman in Multnomah County, a 68-year-old man in Umatilla County, a 70-year-old man in Clackamas County and a 78-year-old man in Washington County. They all had underlying conditions. |
| September 6 | 190 | 28,044 | 1 | 481 | | Deaths: an 89-year-old man in Lane County. He had underlying conditions. |
| September 7 | 154 | 28,190 | 1 | 482 | | Deaths: a 78-year-old woman in Lane County. She had underlying conditions. |
| September 8 | 169 | 28,355 | 4 | 486 | | Deaths: a 90-year-old woman in Marion County, a 100-year-old woman in Marion County, a 72-year-old woman in Marion County and an 86-year-old man in Lane County. They had underlying conditions. |
| September 9 | 125 | 28,471 | 8 | 494 | | Deaths: a 96-year-old woman in Deschutes County, an 81-year-old woman in Washington County, a 93-year-old woman in Washington County, a 49-year-old man in Washington County, a 64-year-old man in Malheur County, a 97-year-old woman in Umatilla County, an 88-year-old man in Morrow County and a 68-year-old man in Lane County. They had underlying conditions or conditions are still being determined. |
| September 10 | 187 | 28,654 | 3 | 497 | | Deaths: an 82-year-old man in Lane County, a 56-year-old man in Malheur County and an 81-year-old woman in Multnomah County. They had underlying conditions or conditions are still being determined. |
| September 11 | 215 | 28,865 | 2 | 499 | | Deaths: a 64-year-old man in Jefferson County and a 91-year-old man in Multnomah County. They both had underlying conditions. |
| September 12 | 293 | 29,156 | 5 | 504 | | Deaths: a 49-year-old woman in Umatilla County, a 76-year-old man in Washington County, a 97-year-old woman in Clackamas County, a 74-year-old woman in Multnomah County, a 63-year-old man in Multnomah County and an 82-year-old man in Lane County. They had underlying conditions or conditions are still being determined. |
| September 13 | 185 | 29,337 | 5 | 509 | | Deaths: an 81-year-old man in Marion County, a 96-year-old woman in Lane County, a 76-year-old man in Marion County, an 89-year-old man in Washington County and an 89-year-old woman in Washington County. They had underlying conditions or conditions are still being determined. |
| September 14 | 151 | 29,484 | 2 | 511 | | Deaths: an 87-year-old man in Lane County and a 92-year-old woman in Washington County. They both had underlying conditions. |
| September 15 | 184 | 29,662 | 8 | 519 | | Deaths: a 73-year-old woman in Washington County, a 74-year-old woman in Malheur County, a 77-year-old man in Multnomah County, a 66-year-old woman in Morrow County, an 89-year-old woman in Clackamas County, a 58-year-old man in Multnomah County, an 85-year-old man in Marion County and an 80-year-old woman in Clackamas County. They had underlying conditions or conditions are still being determined. |
| September 16 | 195 | 29,850 | 2 | 521 | | Deaths: a 70-year-old man in Washington County, he did not have underlying conditions, and a 79-year-old man in Multnomah County. He had underlying conditions. |
| September 17 | 215 | 30,060 | 0 | 521 | | Deaths: None. |
| September 18 | 295 | 30,342 | 0 | 521 | | Deaths: None. |
| September 19 | 266 | 30,599 | 5 | 525 | | Deaths: a 93-year-old woman in Lane County, a 72-year-old woman in Jackson County, an 81-year-old man in Morrow County, a 97-year-old-woman in Marion County and an 86-year-old man in Multnomah County. They all had underlying medical conditions. |
| September 20 | 208 | 30,801 | 1 | 526 | | Deaths: a 73-year-old woman in Marion County. She had underlying conditions. |
| September 21 | 201 | 30,995 | 3 | 529 | | Deaths: an 80-year-old man in Multnomah County, a 54-year-old woman in Multnomah County and a 73-year-old man in Multnomah County. They had underlying conditions or conditions are still being determined. |
| September 22 | 328 | 31,313 | 3 | 532 | | Deaths: a 73-year-old man in Marion County, a 41-year-old man in Malheur County and a 64-year-old woman in Malheur County. Only the first two had underlying conditions. |
| September 23 | 193 | 31,503 | 6 | 537 | | Deaths: a 93-year-old woman in Marion County, a 93-year-old woman in Multnomah County, an 82-year-old man in Washington County, a 75-year-old man in Lane County, a 54-year-old man in Multnomah County and a 95-year-old woman in Multnomah County. They all had underlying conditions. |
| September 24 | 382 | 31,865 | 2 | 539 | | Deaths: an 88-year-old man in Douglas County and an 82-year-old man in Malheur County. They both had underlying conditions. |
| September 25 | 457 | 32,314 | 3 | 542 | | Deaths: a 76-year-old man in Lane County, an 85-year-old man in Multnomah County and a 76-year-old man in Jackson County. They all had underlying conditions. |
| September 26 | 277 | 32,581 | 4 | 546 | | Deaths: a 77-year-old woman in Marion County, a 44-year-old woman in Malheur County, an 84-year-old woman in Washington County and a 75-year-old man in Marion County. They all had underlying conditions or conditions are still being determined. |
| September 27 | 242 | 32,820 | 1 | 547 | | Deaths: an 81-year-old woman in Multnomah County. She had underlying conditions. |
| September 28 | 181 | 32,994 | 0 | 547 | | Deaths: None. |
| September 29 | 299 | 33,291 | 8 | 555 | | Deaths: a 96-year-old woman in Clackamas County, a 95-year-old woman in Multnomah County, an 81-year-old man in Malheur County, a 67-year-old man in Malheur County, a 68-year-old man in Malheur County, a 60-year-old woman in Yamhill County, a 57-year-old man in Marion County and a 66-year-old man in Multnomah County. They all had underlying conditions or conditions are still being determined. |
| September 30 | 220 | 33,509 | 4 | 559 | | Deaths: a 69-year-old man in Clackamas County, an 85-year-old woman in Wasco County, an 86-year-old woman in Marion County and a 61-year-old man in Jackson County. They all had underlying conditions or conditions are still being determined. |
| October 1 | 363 | 33,862 | 1 | 560 | | Deaths: a 44-year-old man in Klamath County. He had underlying conditions. |
| October 2 | 314 | 34,163 | 3 | 563 | | Deaths: an 80-year-old woman from Wasco County, an 83-year-old man in Lane County and an 84-year-old man in Marion County. They all had underlying conditions. |
| October 3 | 360 | 34,511 | 8 | 571 | | Deaths: a 79-year-old man in Umatilla County, a 78-year-old woman in Multnomah County, a 92-year-old woman in Multnomah County, an 89-year-old man in Marion County, an 85-year-old man in Lane County, a 64-year-old woman in Multnomah County, a 92-year-old woman in Multnomah County and a 91-year-old woman in Washington County. They all had underlying conditions. |
| October 4 | 260 | 34,770 | 1 | 572 | | Deaths: an 80-year-old man in Marion County. He had underlying conditions. |
| October 5 | 288 | 35,049 | 0 | 572 | | Deaths: None. |
| October 6 | 301 | 35,340 | 9 | 581 | | Deaths: an 89-year-old woman in Marion County, an 81-year-old woman in Washington County, a 64-year-old woman in Marion County, an 81-year-old man in Malheur County, a 71-year-old man in Malheur County, a 61-year-old man in Malheur County, a 72-year-old man in Clackamas County, a 93-year-old woman in Wasco County and a 91-year-old woman in Multnomah County. All except the 71-year-old man in Malheur County had underlying conditions or conditions are still being determined. |
| October 7 | 305 | 35,634 | 2 | 583 | | Deaths: an 86-year-old man in Washington County and a 69-year-old woman in Deschutes County. They both had underlying conditions. |
| October 8 | 484 | 36,116 | 11 | 594 | | Deaths: an 87-year-old woman in Wasco County, an 85-year-old woman in Washington County, an 88-year-old woman in Washington County, an 89-year-old woman in Wasco County, a 103-year-old woman in Wasco County, a 92-year-old woman in Wasco County, a 95-year-old woman in Wasco County, an 81-year-old woman in Wasco County, a 98-year-old woman in Wasco County, a 75-year-old man in Linn County and an 82-year-old man in Lane County. They all had underlying conditions. |
| October 9 | 425 | 36,526 | 3 | 597 | | Deaths: a 73-year-old man in Lane County, a 91-year-old woman in Multnomah County and an 86-year-old woman in Wasco County. They all had underlying conditions or conditions are still being determined. |
| October 10 | 409 | 36,924 | 2 | 599 | | Deaths: a 76-year-old male in Washington County, and an 88-year-old female in Washington County. They both had underlying conditions. |
| October 11 | 337 | 37,255 | 0 | 599 | | Deaths: None. |
| October 12 | 222 | 37,467 | 0 | 599 | | Deaths: None. |
| October 13 | 321 | 37,780 | 6 | 605 | | Deaths: an 83-year-old man in Yamhill County, an 89-year-old man in Multnomah County, a 75-year-old woman in Marion County, a 90-year-old man in Clackamas County, a 91-year-old man in Malheur County and an 81-year-old woman in Multnomah County. They all had underlying conditions or conditions are still being determined. |
| October 14 | 390 | 38,160 | 3 | 608 | | Deaths: a 93-year-old man in Multnomah County, an 80-year-old woman in Wasco County and an 82-year-old woman in Washington County. They all had underlying conditions. |
| October 15 | 374 | 38,525 | 3 | 611 | | Deaths: a 91-year-old woman in Lane County, an 82-year-old woman in Marion County and a 60-year-old man in Marion County. They all had underlying conditions. |
| October 16 | 418 | 38,935 | 6 | 617 | | Deaths: a 50-year-old man in Jefferson County, an 82-year-old man in Washington County, an 88-year-old woman in Curry County, a 65-year-old woman in Washington County, a 94-year-old woman in Hood River County and an 81-year-old man in Multnomah County. They all had underlying conditions. |
| October 17 | 388 | 39,316 | 3 | 620 | | Deaths: an 83-year-old man in Multnomah County, an 83-year-old woman in Wallowa County and a 92-year-old man in Marion County. They all had underlying conditions. |
| October 18 | 220 | 39,532 | 0 | 620 | | Deaths: None. |
| October 19 | 266 | 39,794 | 8 | 627 | | Deaths: an 89-year-old woman in Lane County, a 61-year-old man in Lane County, an 89-year-old woman in Lane County, an 81-year-old woman in Crook County, a 91-year-old man in Multnomah County, a 69-year-old woman in Umatilla County, a 71-year-old man in Multnomah County and an 85-year-old man in Multnomah County. They all had underlying conditions. |
| October 20 | 346 | 40,136 | 6 | 633 | | Deaths: a 91-year-old woman in Washington County, an 84-year-old man in Josephine County, a 64-year-old woman in Lane County, a 56-year-old man in Marion County, an 83-year-old man in Washington County and an 81-year-old man in Washington County. They all had underlying conditions except the 64 year old in Lane county who did not have underlying conditions. |
| October 21 | 331 | 40,443 | 2 | 635 | | Deaths: a 70-year-old woman in Multnomah County and a 60-year-old woman in Washington County. They both had underlying conditions. |
| October 22 | 373 | 40,810 | 11 | 646 | | Deaths: an 83-year-old man in Baker County, a 74-year-old man in Malheur County, a 77-year-old man in Malheur County, an 87-year-old woman in Multnomah County, a 94-year-old woman in Lane County, a 96-year-old woman in Washington County, an 84-year-old woman in Linn County, a 53-year-old man in Umatilla County, a 57-year-old man in Malheur County, a 64-year-old man in Douglas County, a 75-year-old woman in Multnomah County. They all had underlying conditions or conditions are still being determined. |
| October 23 | 550 | 41,348 | 3 | 649 | | Deaths: an 82-year-old woman in Marion County, a 79-year-old woman in Multnomah County and a 68-year-old man in Multnomah County. They all had underlying conditions. |
| October 24 | 399 | 41,739 | 4 | 653 | | Deaths: a 73-year-old woman in Multnomah County, a 69-year-old woman in Malheur County, an 87-year-old man in Washington County and a 75-year-old woman in Marion County. They all had underlying conditions. |
| October 25 | 366 | 42,101 | 0 | 653 | | Deaths: None. |
| October 26 | 339 | 42,436 | 2 | 655 | | Deaths: a 61-year-old man in Douglas County and a 96-year-old woman in Washington County. They both had underlying conditions. |
| October 27 | 391 | 42,808 | 9 | 664 | | Deaths: a 63-year-old woman in Washington County, a 79-year-old woman in Wasco County, a 66-year-old woman in Multnomah County, a 67-year-old man in Multnomah County, a 62-year-old man in Umatilla County, an 82-year-old man in Multnomah County, a 52-year-old man in Morrow County, a 64-year-old man in Douglas County and a 66-year-old woman in Douglas County. They all had underlying conditions or conditions are still being determined. |
| October 28 | 424 | 43,228 | 7 | 671 | | Deaths: a 55-year-old man in Jefferson County, an 81-year-old man in Multnomah County, a 68-year-old woman in Multnomah County, a 58-year-old woman in Coos County, a 78-year-old man in Jackson County, a 62-year-old man in Clackamas County and an 85-year-old woman in Washington County. Except for the 62 year old from Clackamas County, they all had underlying conditions or conditions are still being determined. |
| October 29 | 575 | 43,793 | 2 | 673 | | Deaths: a 96-year-old woman in Multnomah County and a 94-year-old woman in Marion County. They both had underlying conditions. |
| October 30 | 600 | 44,389 | 2 | 675 | | Deaths: a 95-year-old woman in Linn County and an 83-year-old woman in Multnomah County. They both had underlying conditions or conditions are still being determined. |
| October 31 | 555 | 44,921 | 14 | 689 | | Deaths: a 91-year-old man in Marion County, an 89-year-old man in Multnomah County, an 89-year-old man in Marion County, an 89-year-old woman in Multnomah County, a 96-year-old man in Linn County, a 57-year-old man in Multnomah County, a 92-year-old woman in Curry County, a 75-year-old man in Lane County, a 73-year-old woman in Columbia County, an 81-year-old man in Multnomah County, a 62-year-old man in Marion County, an 80-year-old woman in Multnomah County, a 66-year-old woman in Crook County and a 78-year-old man in Multnomah County. They all had underlying conditions or conditions are still being determined. |
| November 1 | 524 | 45,429 | 2 | 691 | | Deaths: a 73-year-old woman in Crook County and a 90-year-old woman in Washington County. They both had underlying conditions. |
| November 2 | 557 | 45,978 | 1 | 692 | | Deaths: a 90-year-old woman in Multnomah County. She had underlying conditions. |
| November 3 | 495 | 46,460 | 9 | 701 | | Deaths: an 87-year-old woman in Marion County, a 63-year-old woman in Clackamas County, a 78-year-old man in Multnomah County, a 95-year-old woman in Marion County, a 47-year-old woman in Jefferson County, an 85-year-old woman in Multnomah County, a 75-year-old man in Josephine County, an 87-year-old woman in Clackamas County and a 94-year-old man in Washington County. They all had underlying conditions or conditions are still being determined. |
| November 4 | 597 | 47,049 | 4 | 705 | | Deaths: a 90-year-old woman in Washington County, an 80-year-old woman in Marion County, a 98-year-old man in Washington County and a 69-year-old woman in Jackson County. They all had underlying conditions or conditions are still being determined. |
| November 5 | 805 | 47,839 | 5 | 710 | | Deaths: a 74-year-old man in Clackamas County, an 86-year-old man in Multnomah County, a 62-year-old woman in Douglas County, an 80-year-old woman in Douglas County and a 75-year-old man in Crook County. They all had underlying conditions or conditions are still being determined. |
| November 6 | 770 | 48,608 | 6 | 716 | | Deaths: a 97-year-old woman in Multnomah County, a 59-year-old woman in Multnomah County, an 88-year-old woman in Multnomah County, a 95-year-old woman in Marion County, an 82-year-old woman in Wasco County and a 74-year-old man in Washington County. They all had underlying conditions or conditions are still being determined. |
| November 7 | 988 | 49,587 | 13 | 729 | | Deaths: an 84-year-old woman in Multnomah County, a 79-year-old man in Lane County, a 64-year-old man in Multnomah County, a 58-year-old woman in Washington County, an 82-year-old man in Washington County, an 84-year-old woman in Marion County, a 94-year-old woman in Clackamas County, a 58-year-old woman in Multnomah County, a 91-year-old woman in Washington County, an 83-year-old woman in Washington County, an 86-year-old man in Multnomah County, a 90-year-old man in Multnomah County and an 80-year-old woman in Multnomah County. With the exception of the 58-year-old woman in Multnomah County, they all had underlying conditions or conditions are still being determined. |
| November 8 | 874 | 50,448 | 1 | 730 | | Deaths: an 82-year-old man in Washington County. He had underlying conditions. |
| November 9 | 723 | 51,155 | 4 | 734 | | Deaths: an 84-year-old man in Lane County, a 79-year-old woman in Lane County, an 86-year-old woman in Marion County and a 50-year-old man in Lane County. They all had underlying conditions. |
| November 10 | 771 | 51,909 | 3 | 737 | | Deaths: a 73-year-old man in Deschutes County, a 94-year-old woman in Washington County and a 94-year-old man in Marion County. They all had underlying conditions. |
| November 11 | 876 | 52,770 | 5 | 742 | | Deaths: a 76-year-old man in Marion County, a 92-year-old woman in Marion County, a 100-year-old woman in Multnomah County, an 81-year-old man in Multnomah County and an 84-year-old man in Multnomah County. They all had underlying conditions or conditions are still being determined. |
| November 12 | 1,122 | 53,879 | 4 | 746 | | Deaths: a 62-year-old man in Lane County, a 93-year-old man in Clackamas County, a 95-year-old man in Marion County and a 35-year-old man in Multnomah County. They all had underlying conditions or conditions are still being determined. |
| November 13 | 1,076 | 54,937 | 7 | 753 | | Deaths: an 82-year-old woman in Marion County, a 77-year-old woman in Multnomah County, a 38-year-old man in Marion County, an 80-year-old man in Multnomah County, an 84-year-old woman in Benton County, an 87-year-old man in Jackson County and an 80-year-old man in Jackson County. All had underlying conditions. |
| November 14 | 1,097 | 56,018 | 6 | 759 | | Deaths: an 87-year-old woman in Multnomah County, a 96-year-old man in Multnomah County, an 89-year-old woman in Multnomah County, an 87-year-old man in Lane County, a 69-year-old woman in Multnomah County and an 84-year-old man in Clackamas County. All had underlying conditions or conditions are still being determined. |
| November 15 | 868 | 56,880 | 2 | 761 | | Deaths: an 81-year-old man in Umatilla County and a 66-year-old woman in Umatilla County. They both had underlying conditions. |
| November 16 | 781 | 57,646 | 4 | 765 | | Deaths: a 41-year-old man in Washington County, a 78-year-old man in Washington County, a 60-year-old man in Clackamas County and a 74-year-old woman in Multnomah County. All except the 41-year-old man in Washington county had underlying conditions. |
| November 17 | 935 | 58,570 | 13 | 778 | | Deaths: a 63-year-old man in Umatilla County, an 84-year-old woman in Multnomah County, a 63-year-old man in Multnomah County, a 70-year-old woman in Lane County, a 76-year-old woman in Linn County, a 69-year-old man in Multnomah County, a 64-year-old man in Washington County, an 85-year-old woman in Douglas County, a 63-year-old man in Marion County, a 52-year-old man in Marion County, a 67-year-old woman in Marion County, a 98-year-old man in Clackamas County and an 85-year-old man in Multnomah County. All had underlying conditions or conditions are still being determined. |
| November 18 | 1099 | 59,669 | 10 | 788 | | Deaths: a 65-year-old woman in Yamhill County, a 75-year-old woman in Multnomah County, a 92-year-old man, an 86-year-old man in Douglas County, an 80-year-old man in Multnomah County, a 77-year-old man in Crook County, an 85-year-old woman in Washington County, an 84-year-old woman in Jackson County, an 86-year-old man in Washington County and a 76-year-old man in Lane County. All had underlying conditions or conditions are still being determined. |
| November 19 | 1225 | 60,873 | 20 | 808 | | Deaths: a 95-year-old man in Wasco County, a 30-year-old man in Lane County, a 94-year-old man in Clackamas County, an 85-year-old man in Washington County, 40-year-old man in Malheur County, a 66-year-old woman in Multnomah County, a 62-year-old woman in Multnomah County, a 49-year-old man in Jackson County, an 83-year-old man in Douglas County, a 92-year-old man in Multnomah County, a 91-year-old man in Jackson County, an 84-year-old man in Multnomah County, a 72-year-old man in Multnomah County, an 89-year-old man in Jackson County, a 94-year-old woman in Jackson County, an 86-year-old man in Jackson County, an 81-year-old woman in Jackson County, a 77-year-old woman in Jackson County, an 87-year-old woman in Grant County and a 74-year-old woman in Jackson County. All had underlying conditions or conditions are still being determined. |
| November 20 | 1306 | 62,175 | 4 | 812 | | Deaths: an 81-year-old man in Douglas County, an 83-year-old woman in Multnomah County, a 70-year-old man in Klamath County and an 81-year-old woman in Harney County. All had underlying conditions or conditions are still being determined. |
| November 21 | 1509 | 63,668 | 7 | 819 | | Deaths: a 76-year-old man in Douglas County, an 84-year-old man in Jackson County, a 75-year-old woman in Columbia County, a 77-year-old woman in Jackson County, an 83-year-old man in Jackson County, an 86-year-old man in Washington County and an 85-year-old woman in Jackson County. All had underlying conditions or conditions are still being determined. |
| November 22 | 1517 | 65,170 | 1 | 820 | | Deaths: a 65-year-old man in Multnomah County. Underlying conditions are being confirmed. |
| November 23 | 1174 | 66,333 | 6 | 826 | | Deaths: a 57-year-old man in Marion County, a 40-year-old woman in Marion County, an 89-year-old woman in Multnomah County, a 92-year-old man in Multnomah County, a 96-year-old woman in Marion County and a 60-year-old man in Multnomah County. All had underlying conditions or conditions are still being determined. |
| November 24 | 1011 | 67,333 | 21 | 847 | | Deaths: a 74-year-old woman in Washington County, a 94-year-old man in Multnomah County, a 68-year-old woman in Multnomah County, an 81-year-old man in Multnomah County, an 89-year-old woman in Multnomah County, a 93-year-old woman in Washington County, an 89-year-old woman in Wallowa County, an 81-year-old man in Douglas County, a 75-year-old man in Multnomah County, a 92-year-old woman in Multnomah County, a 91-year-old woman in Douglas County, an 81-year-old man in Linn County, an 82-year-old man in Jackson County, a 72-year-old woman in Jackson County, an 89-year-old man in Union County, a 94-year-old man in Clackamas County, a 74-year-old man in Multnomah County, a 91-year-old man in Multnomah County, a 58-year-old man in Multnomah County, a 72-year-old man in Multnomah County and a 33-year-old man in Marion County. All had underlying conditions or conditions are still being determined. |
| November 25 | 1189 | 68,503 | 20 | 867 | | Deaths: a 96-year-old woman in Lane County, a 90-year-old man in Lane County, an 84-year-old man in Marion County, a 94-year-old woman in Multnomah County, a 78-year-old woman in Lane County, a 90-year-old man in Lake County, a 97-year-old woman in Malheur County, a 66-year-old woman in Multnomah County, a 73-year-old man in Malheur County, a 92-year-old man in Wasco County, a 76-year-old man in Multnomah County, an 84-year-old man in Multnomah County, a 76-year-old man in Multnomah County, a 79-year-old man in Multnomah County, a 47-year-old man in Marion County, a 64-year-old man in Marion County, a 95-year-old man in Marion County, a 27-year-old man in Lincoln County, a 90-year-old woman in Malheur County and a 98-year-old woman in Multnomah County. All had underlying conditions or conditions are still being determined. |
| November 26 | 1514 | 70,006 | 15 | 882 | | Deaths: an 83-year-old man in Coos County, a 90-year-old man in Jackson County, a 77-year-old woman in Jackson County, an 86-year-old woman in Jackson County, a 75-year-old woman in Lane County, a 72-year-old woman in Lincoln County, an 86-year-old man in Linn County, a 96-year-old man in Marion County, an 85-year-old man in Marion County, an 80-year-old man in Multnomah County, a 61-year-old man in Multnomah County, an 80-year-old man in Polk County, a 72-year-old woman in Umatilla County, a 77-year-old man in Washington County, a 96-year-old woman in Washington County and an 87-year-old woman in Union County. All had underlying conditions or conditions are still being determined. |
| November 27 | 826 | 70,832 | 3 | 885 | | Deaths: an 87-year-old woman in Union County, an 87-year-old woman in Linn County and a 78-year-old woman in Linn County. All had underlying conditions. The number of new cases reported today is lower than expected because several of the local health public departments that report daily numbers to OHA were off for the Thanksgiving holiday. |
| November 28 | 1669 | 72,506 | 11 | 896 | | Deaths: a 62-year-old woman in Douglas County, a 96-year-old woman in Jackson County, a 62-year-old man in Lane County, a 78-year-old man in Marion County, a 90-year-old woman in Marion County, an 89-year-old woman in Multnomah County, a 76-year-old man in Multnomah County, a 102-year-old woman in Union County, a 56-year-old man in Coos County, an 87-year-old man in Deschutes County and a 79-year-old man in Jackson County. All had underlying conditions or conditions are still being determined. The number of new cases reported today is higher, as expected, because several of the local health public departments that report daily numbers to OHA were off for the Thanksgiving holiday. Today's case count is the highest seen since the beginning of the pandemic. |
| November 29 | 1599 | 74,120 | 9 | 905 | | Deaths: an 82-year-old woman in Jackson County, a 69-year-old woman in Linn County, a 72-year-old woman in Malheur County, a 76-year-old woman in Malheur County, an 82-year-old woman in Marion County, a 73-year-old man in Multnomah County, an 88-year-old woman in Multnomah County, an 88-year-old woman in Washington County and an 80-year-old man in Washington County. All had underlying conditions or conditions are still being determined. Today's COVID-19 death count is the highest daily count since the onset of the pandemic in Oregon. |
| November 30 | 1314 | 75,431 | 7 | 912 | | Deaths: a 64-year-old man in Lane County, a 67-year-old man in Marion County, an 85-year-old woman in Marion County, a 48-year-old man in Multnomah County, an 83-year-old man in Multnomah County, a 78-year-old man in Multnomah County and a 58-year-old man in Washington County. All had underlying conditions. |
| December 1 | 1233 | 76,654 | 24 | 936 | | Deaths: a 95-year-old man in Baker County, a 65-year-old woman in Multnomah County, an 88-year-old woman in Clackamas County, an 84-year-old woman in Yamhill County, a 74-year-old man in Multnomah County, a 63-year-old woman in Marion County, an 83-year-old woman in Multnomah County, an 87-year-old man in Marion County, a 56-year-old man in Marion County, a 64-year-old man in Multnomah County, an 80-year-old woman in Multnomah County, a 77-year-old woman in Marion County, an 87-year-old man in Polk County, a 90-year-old man in Polk County, a 96-year-old woman in Clackamas County, a 90-year-old woman in Multnomah County, a 66-year-old woman in Polk County, a 93-year-old woman in Jackson County, a 91-year-old woman in Jackson County, an 82-year-old woman in Jackson County, an 80-year-old man in Jackson County, an 82-year-old man in Union County, a 75-year-old man in Union County and a 92-year-old man in Clackamas County. All except the 96-year-old woman in Clackamas County had underlying conditions or conditions are still being determined. |
| December 2 | 1244 | 78,160 | 18 | 953 | | Deaths: a 68-year-old man in Marion County, a 96-year-old woman in Douglas County, a 98-year-old man in Malheur County, a 71-year-old man in Lane County, an 87-year-old woman in Lane County, a 90-year-old woman in Hood River County, a 79-year-old man in Jackson County, an 82-year-old man in Lane County, a 94-year-old man in Umatilla County, a 57-year-old man in Clackamas County, an 80-year-old woman in Washington County, a 74-year-old woman in Jackson County, a 69-year-old woman in Josephine County, a 75-year-old man in Columbia County, a 74-year-old woman in Multnomah County, an 81-year-old man, a 68-year-old woman in Klamath County and a 76-year-old woman in Lane County. All had underlying conditions or conditions are still being determined. |
| December 3 | 1151 | 79,263 | 21 | 973 | | Deaths: a 70-year-old woman in Washington County, a 76-year-old man in Multnomah County, a 56-year-old man in Lane County, a 98-year-old woman in Lane County, a 51-year-old man in Marion County, an 85-year-old woman in Lane County, a 95-year-old woman in Clackamas County, a 97-year-old man in Clackamas County, a 95-year-old woman in Linn County, a 70-year-old man in Multnomah County, a 74-year-old man in Marion County, a 78-year-old man in Marion County, a 72-year-old man in Marion County, an 83-year-old man in Jackson County, an 81-year-old man in Marion County, a 93-year-old woman in Multnomah County, an 83-year-old woman in Multnomah County, an 81-year-old man in Marion County, an 81-year-old man in Multnomah County, a 74-year-old man in Multnomah County and a 92-year-old man in Union County. All had underlying conditions or conditions are still being determined. |
| December 4 | 2,176 | 81,437 | 30 | 1,003 | | Deaths: an 85-year-old man in Washington County, a 78-year-old man in Multnomah County, a 79-year-old woman in Lane County, an 82-year-old woman in Marion County, an 89-year-old woman in Multnomah County, a 79-year-old woman in Multnomah County, an 82-year-old woman in Multnomah County, a 77-year-old man in Polk County, a 79-year-old man in Lane County, a 67-year-old man in Multnomah County, a 74-year-old man in Washington County, a 79-year-old man in Marion County, a 76-year-old man in Lincoln County, a 68-year-old man in Multnomah County, a 79-year-old man in Multnomah County, a 77-year-old man in Jackson County, an 89-year-old man in Douglas County, a 94-year-old woman in Jackson County, a 94-year-old woman in Jackson County, a 52-year-old woman in Klamath County, a 59-year-old man in Klamath County, a 77-year-old man in Marion County, a 76-year-old woman in Marion County, a 91-year-old man in Marion County, an 82-year-old man in Multnomah County, a 67-year-old man in Multnomah County, a 67-year-old man in Multnomah County, a 60-year-old man in Multnomah County, a 90-year-old woman in Multnomah County and a 96-year-old man in Washington County. All had underlying conditions or conditions are still being determined. Today's death toll and case count are both the highest we have seen yet during the COVID-19 Pandemic in Oregon. |
| December 5 | 1,847 | 83,243 | 24 | 1,027 | | Deaths: a 77-year-old man in Clackamas County, a 78-year-old man in Yamhill County, a 93-year-old woman in Clackamas County, a 71-year-old man in Multnomah County, an 87-year-old man in Douglas County, a 63-year-old woman in Douglas County, a 59-year-old man in Multnomah County, a 76-year-old woman in Multnomah County, a 67-year-old woman in Multnomah County, a 95-year-old woman in Marion County, a 76-year-old man in Douglas County, a 78-year-old woman in Clackamas County, an 81-year-old man in Clackamas County, an 80-year-old man in Multnomah County, a 77-year-old woman in Multnomah County, an 83-year-old man in Washington County, a 94-year-old male in Polk County, an 82-year-old female in Klamath County, a 91-year-old female in Marion County, a 92-year-old man in Marion County, a 68-year-old woman in Columbia County, a 71-year-old man in Josephine County, a 94-year-old woman in Polk County and a 97-year-old man in Columbia County. All had underlying conditions or conditions are still being determined. |
| December 6 | 1,290 | 84,496 | 6 | 1,033 | | Deaths: an 81-year-old woman in Coos County, a 62-year-old woman in Douglas County, an 89-year-old man in Marion County, an 86-year-old woman in Marion County, a 58-year-old man in Multnomah County and an 87-year-old woman in Polk County. All except the 58-year-old man from Multnomah County had underlying conditions or conditions are still being determined. |
| December 7 | 1,331 | 85,788 | 12 | 1,045 | | Deaths: a 71-year-old woman in Gilliam County, a 50-year-old man in Lane County, a 77-year-old woman in Linn County, a 93-year-old woman in Linn County, a 64-year-old woman in Marion County, a 50-year-old woman in Multnomah County, an 88-year-old man in Multnomah County, an 82-year-old man in Multnomah County, a 37-year-old man in Multnomah County, a 79-year-old man in Multnomah County, an 84-year-old woman in Washington County and an 86-year-old man in Benton County. All except the 37-year-old man in Multnomah County had underlying conditions or conditions are still being determined. |
| December 8 | 1,341 | 87,082 | 36 | 1,080 | | Deaths: an 80-year-old man in Clackamas County, a 64-year-old man in Columbia County, an 89-year-old man in Douglas County, a 76-year-old man in Jackson County, a 71-year-old woman in Jackson County, a 73-year-old man in Jackson County, a 72-year-old woman in Klamath County, a 78-year-old woman in Josephine County, an 88-year-old man in Klamath County, a 77-year-old woman in Lane County, a 96-year-old woman in Lane County, an 87-year-old woman in Lane County, an 82-year-old woman in Lane County, a 72-year-old man in Marion County, an 89-year-old man in Marion County, an 87-year-old woman in Marion County, a 69-year-old man in Marion County, a 90-year-old man in Marion County, a 97-year-old man in Marion County, an 88-year-old man in Multnomah County, an 87-year-old woman in Multnomah County, an 88-year-old woman in Multnomah County, a 92-year-old woman in Multnomah County, an 88-year-old woman in Multnomah County, a 73-year-old woman in Multnomah County, an 84-year-old man in Multnomah County, a 79-year-old woman in Multnomah County, a 78-year-old man in Multnomah County, a 77-year-old man in Multnomah County, an 83-year-old man in Multnomah County, an 87-year-old man in Multnomah County, a 74-year-old man in Umatilla County, a 54-year-old woman in Washington County, an 84-year-old woman in Washington County, a 73-year-old man in Washington County and a 78-year-old man in Yamhill County. All had underlying conditions or conditions are still being determined. |
| December 9 | 1,243 | 88,287 | 30 | 1,110 | | Deaths: a 46-year-old woman in Clackamas County, a 59-year-old man in Clackamas County, a 94-year-old woman in Clackamas County, an 89-year-old woman in Clackamas County, an 82-year-old woman in Clackamas County, a 72-year-old man in Klamath County, a 75-year-old woman in Lane County, a 79-year-old man in Lane County, a 59-year-old man in Lane County, a 65-year-old woman in Lane County, a 69-year-old woman in Lane County, an 84-year-old man in Linn County, a 75-year-old woman in Marion County, a 76-year-old man in Marion County, an 86-year-old woman in Multnomah County, a 72-year-old woman in Multnomah County, an 88-year-old woman in Multnomah County, a 72-year-old man in Multnomah County, an 82-year-old man in Multnomah County, a 97-year-old man in Multnomah County, a 97-year-old man in Multnomah County, a 77-year-old woman in Multnomah County, an 83-year-old man in Multnomah County, a 62-year-old man in Multnomah County, a 61-year-old woman in Multnomah County, is a 39-year-old man in Umatilla County, a 94-year-old woman in Washington County, an 82-year-old woman in Washington County, a 97-year-old woman in Washington County and a 62-year-old man in Clatsop County. All except the 75-year-old woman in Marion County had underlying conditions or conditions are still being determined. |
| December 10 | 1,586 | 89,838 | 13 | 1,123 | | Deaths: a 64-year-old man in Multnomah County, an 83-year-old woman in Clackamas County, a 91-year-old woman in Deschutes County, an 83-year-old man in Douglas County, a 75-year-old man in Douglas County, a 90-year-old woman in Jackson County, a 73-year-old woman in Josephine County, an 81-year-old woman in Lane County, an 81-year-old woman in Lane County, a 97-year-old woman in Lane County, a 94-year-old woman in Marion County, a 95-year-old woman in Marion County and an 81-year-old man in Union County. All had underlying conditions or conditions are still being determined. |
| December 11 | 1,610 | 91,421 | 16 | 1,138 | | Deaths: a 66-year-old man in Deschutes County, a 70-year-old man in Douglas County, a 75-year-old woman in Hood River County, an 87-year-old man in Jackson County, a 76-year-old man in Jackson County, a 55-year-old woman in Jackson County, a 76-year-old man in Jefferson County, a 68-year-old man in Josephine County, a 69-year-old man in Lane County, a 65-year-old man in Marion County, a 76-year-old woman in Marion County, a 57-year-old man in Multnomah County, a 52-year-old man in Multnomah County, a 53-year-old man in Multnomah County, a 78-year-old man in Multnomah County and an 81-year-old woman in Multnomah County. All except the 65-year-old man in Marion County had underlying conditions or conditions are still being determined. |
| December 12 | 1,440 | 92,839 | 13 | 1,150 | | Deaths: a 74-year-old woman in Multnomah County, a 65-year-old woman in Clackamas County, a 71-year-old woman in Douglas County, a 68-year-old man in Jackson County, a 77-year-old woman in Lane County, an 86-year-old woman in Lane County, a 71-year-old woman in Marion County, a 96-year-old woman in Marion County, an 89-year-old man in Marion County, a 77-year-old man in Multnomah County, a 65-year-old woman in Union County, an 88-year-old woman in Washington County and a 72-year-old woman in Hood River County. All had underlying conditions or conditions are still being determined. |
| December 13 | 1,048 | 93,853 | 6 | 1,155 | | Deaths: a 74-year-old woman in Jackson County, a 91-year-old man in Josephine County, a 76-year-old woman in Linn County, a 98-year-old man in Marion County, a 94-year-old woman in Washington County and an 87-year-old man in Washington County. All had underlying conditions or conditions are still being determined. |
| December 14 | 1,180 | 95,010 | 6 | 1,161 | | Deaths: an 88-year-old woman in Clackamas County, a 97-year-old woman in Clackamas County, an 80-year-old man in Deschutes County, an 88-year-old man in Douglas County, a 77-year-old woman in Hood River County and a 91-year-old man in Washington County. All had underlying conditions or conditions are still being determined. |
| December 15 | 1,129 | 96,092 | 54 | 1,214 | | Deaths: a 76-year-old woman in Hood River County, a 71-year-old woman in Washington County, a 96-year-old woman in Washington County, an 89-year-old woman in Lane County, an 88-year-old woman in Jackson County, an 85-year-old woman in Multnomah County, an 84-year-old woman in Multnomah County, a 74-year-old man in Klamath County, an 80-year-old woman in Linn County, a 91-year-old man in Clackamas County, a 76-year-old man in Clackamas County, a 70-year-old man in Douglas County, a 79-year-old man in Douglas County, an 88-year-old woman in Douglas County, a 63-year-old woman in Douglas County, an 89-year-old woman in Jackson County, a 71-year-old woman in Josephine County, an 83-year-old woman in Lake County, a 95-year-old woman in Lane County, a 90-year-old woman in Lane County, a 73-year-old woman in Lane County, an 84-year-old man in Lane County, an 89-year-old woman in Linn County, a 56-year-old man in Malheur County, a 90-year-old man in Malheur County, a 54-year-old woman in Marion County, an 84-year-old man in Marion County, a 79-year-old man in Marion County, a 79-year-old man in Marion County, a 62-year-old man in Marion County, a 57-year-old man in Marion County, a 68-year-old man in Multnomah County, a 65-year-old man in Multnomah County, a 60-year-old man in Multnomah County, an 87-year-old man in Multnomah County, a 47-year-old man in Multnomah County, an 87-year-old man in Multnomah County, a 77-year-old man in Multnomah County, a 70-year-old woman in Multnomah County, a 70-year-old woman in Multnomah County, a 76-year-old man in Multnomah County, a 97-year-old woman in Multnomah County, a 71-year-old man in Multnomah County, a 68-year-old man in Multnomah County, a 91-year-old woman in Multnomah County, an 87-year-old woman in Multnomah County, a 75-year-old woman in Multnomah County, an 84-year-old woman in Multnomah County, an 89-year-old man in Umatilla County, a 73-year-old man in Union County, a 39-year-old woman in Washington County, a 73-year-old woman in Yamhill County and a 76-year-old man in Hood River County. All except the 83-year-old woman in Lake County had underlying conditions or conditions are still being determined. Today's death toll is the highest day we have seen yet during the COVID-19 Pandemic in Oregon. |
| December 16 | 1,562 | 97,622 | 48 | 1,262 | | Deaths: a 67-year-old man in Clackamas County, an 89-year-old man in Clackamas County, a 59-year-old man in Clackamas County, a 91-year-old man in Clackamas County, a 79-year-old woman in Clackamas County, a 62-year-old man in Clatsop County, an 85-year-old woman in Benton County, a 52-year-old man in Columbia County, a 64-year-old man in Douglas County, a 54-year-old man in Jackson County, a 94-year-old woman in Josephine County, a 75-year-old woman in Lane County, an 83-year-old man in Lane County, a 30-year-old man in Lane County, an 80-year-old man in Linn County, a 78-year-old woman in Linn County, a 95-year-old woman in Marion County, a 52-year-old woman in Marion County, a 77-year-old woman in Multnomah County, a 64-year-old man in Multnomah County, an 80-year-old woman in Multnomah County, a 91-year-old woman in Multnomah County, a 70-year-old woman in Multnomah County, an 87-year-old man in Multnomah County, an 87-year-old man in Multnomah County, a 69-year-old man in Multnomah County, a 77-year-old woman in Multnomah County, a 50-year-old man in Multnomah County, an 88-year-old man in Multnomah County, a 75-year-old woman in Union County, an 89-year-old woman in Washington County, a 94-year-old woman in Washington County, a 93-year-old man in Washington County, a 92-year-old woman in Washington County, an 89-year-old man in Washington County, an 85-year-old man in Washington County, an 80-year-old man in Yamhill County, a 79-year-old woman in Yamhill County, a 94-year-old woman in Yamhill County, an 87-year-old woman in Yamhill County, an 86-year-old woman in Yamhill County, a 91-year-old woman in Yamhill County, a 98-year-old woman in Yamhill County, a 79-year-old woman in Yamhill County, an 86-year-old man in Multnomah County, a 62-year-old woman in Yamhill County, a 95-year-old woman in Washington County and a 93-year-old woman in Lane County. All had underlying conditions or conditions are still being determined. |
| December 17 | 1,339 | 98,936 | 21 | 1,283 | | Deaths: a 92-year-old woman in Jackson County, an 80-year-old man in Josephine County, a 78-year-old man in Klamath County, an 83-year-old woman in Lane County, an 87-year-old woman in Malheur County, a 94-year-old woman in Marion County, an 89-year-old woman in Marion County, an 83-year-old man in Multnomah County, a 78-year-old woman in Multnomah County, an 80-year-old man in Multnomah County, a 73-year-old woman in Multnomah County, a 78-year-old man in Douglas County, an 87-year-old woman in Multnomah County, a 91-year-old woman in Multnomah County, a 78-year-old man in Multnomah County, a 62-year-old man in Multnomah County, an 83-year-old man in Multnomah County, an 84-year-old woman in Multnomah County, a 78-year-old woman in Washington County, a 75-year-old woman in Washington County and an 81-year-old woman in Yamhill County. All except the 94-year-old woman in Marion County and 87-year-old woman in Multnomah County had underlying conditions or conditions are still being determined. |
| December 18 | 1,390 | 100,308 | 21 | 1,304 | | Deaths: a 94-year-old man in Clackamas County, an 80-year-old woman in Clackamas County, a 62-year-old man in Deschutes County, a 76-year-old man in Jackson County, a 90-year-old woman in Josephine County, a 92-year-old woman in Josephine County, an 84-year-old man in Josephine County, a 78-year-old man in Lake County, a 95-year-old man in Lake County, a 78-year-old woman in Malheur County, a 58-year-old man in Marion County, a 90-year-old woman in Marion County, a 76-year-old man in Lane County, an 87-year-old man in Multnomah County, a 65-year-old woman in Multnomah County, an 89-year-old woman in Multnomah County, a 91-year-old man in Umatilla County, a 90-year-old woman in Wasco County, an 80-year-old woman in Washington County, a 74-year-old man in Washington County and a 93-year-old woman in Yamhill County. All had underlying conditions or conditions are still being determined. |
| December 19 | 1,542 | 101,814 | 36 | 1,340 | | Deaths: an 86-year-old woman in Coos County, a 42-year-old woman in Washington County, an 80-year-old man in Clackamas County, an 83-year-old man in Columbia County, a 64-year-old woman in Coos County, a 76-year-old man in Jackson County, an 89-year-old woman in Jackson County, a 90-year-old woman in Jackson County, a 68-year-old woman in Jefferson County, a 65-year-old man in Jefferson County, a 60-year-old woman in Josephine County, a 63-year-old man in Klamath County, an 89-year-old man in Lane County, a 92-year-old man in Marion County, an 83-year-old man in Marion County, an 84-year-old man in Marion County, a 71-year-old woman in Multnomah County, an 85-year-old woman in Multnomah County, a 75-year-old woman in Multnomah County, a 94-year-old woman in Multnomah County, an 83-year-old woman in Multnomah County, a 101-year-old woman in Multnomah County, a 76-year-old woman in Multnomah County, an 83-year-old woman in Multnomah County, a 74-year-old man in Multnomah County, a 74-year-old man in Multnomah County, an 82-year-old woman in Multnomah County, an 85-year-old woman in Multnomah County, a 64-year-old man in Multnomah County, an 89-year-old man in Multnomah County, an 80-year-old man in Multnomah County, a 60-year-old woman in Multnomah County, an 80-year-old man in Multnomah County, a 93-year-old woman in Multnomah County, a 57-year-old man in Washington County and a 78-year-old woman in Union County. All had underlying conditions or conditions are still being determined. |
| December 20 | 1,153 | 102,930 | 1 | 1,341 | | Deaths: a 91-year-old woman in Josephine County. She had underlying conditions. |
| December 21 | 846 | 103,755 | 6 | 1,347 | | Deaths: a 58-year-old man in Deschutes County, a 90-year-old woman in Douglas County, a 78-year-old woman in Hood River County, a 74-year-old man in Jackson County, a 60-year-old man in Jackson County, a 96-year-old woman in Lane County. All had underlying conditions or conditions are still being determined. |
| December 22 | 1,282 | 105,037 | 35 | 1,382 | | Deaths: a 61-year-old woman in Benton County, a 76-year-old man in Clackamas County, a 73-year-old woman in Crook County, a 50-year-old man in Curry County, a 41-year-old woman in Hood River County, a 90-year-old man in Jackson County, a 64-year-old woman in Jackson County, a 95-year-old woman in Josephine County, an 81-year-old man in Klamath County, a 92-year-old woman in Linn County, a 94-year-old woman in Marion County, a 71-year-old woman in Marion County, a 62-year-old man in Benton County, an 86-year-old man in Marion County, an 82-year-old woman in Marion County, a 74-year-old man in Marion County, a 91-year-old man in Marion County, an 83-year-old man in Morrow County, an 81-year-old man in Multnomah County, an 80-year-old man in Multnomah County, a 95-year-old man in Multnomah County, an 84-year-old woman in Multnomah County, a 74-year-old man in Columbia County, an 80-year-old in Multnomah County, an 83-year-old in Multnomah County, a 69-year-old woman in Multnomah County, an 86-year-old man in Multnomah County, a 95-year-old man in Multnomah County, an 80-year-old man in Multnomah County, a 78-year-old woman in Washington County, a 92-year-old man in Washington County, a 95-year-old man in Washington County, a 96-year-old woman in Washington County, an 87-year-old woman in Yamhill County and a 95-year-old woman in Yamhill County. All had underlying conditions or conditions are still being determined. |
| December 23 | 1,000 | 105,970 | 21 | 1,403 | | Deaths: an 84-year-old man in Clackamas County, an 80-year-old woman in Clackamas County, an 84-year-old man in Columbia County, an 87-year-old man in Columbia County, an 87-year-old man in Jackson County, a 67-year-old man in Jefferson County, an 82-year-old man in Jefferson County, an 85-year-old man in Baker County, an 86-year-old woman in Josephine County, a 77-year-old woman in Lane County, a 78-year-old man in Lane County, a 91-year-old woman in Lane County, a 96-year-old woman in Lincoln County, an 82-year-old man in Multnomah County, a 53-year-old woman in Multnomah County, a 96-year-old woman in Multnomah County, an 86-year-old man in Polk County, a 75-year-old man in Umatilla County, an 84-year-old woman in Wasco County and an 83-year-old woman in Wasco County. All had underlying conditions or conditions are still being determined. |
| December 24 | 871 | 106,821 | 12 | 1,415 | | Deaths: an 89-year-old woman in Multnomah County, a 90-year-old in Clackamas County, a 55-year-old man in Clatsop County, a 59-year-old man in Hood River County, an 85-year-old woman in Jackson County, a 58-year-old man in Klamath County, a 66-year-old man in Malheur County, an 87-year-old woman in Marion County, an 88-year-old woman in Marion County, a 92-year-old woman in Multnomah County, a 72-year-old woman in Umatilla County and a 62-year-old woman in Yamhill County. All except the 55-year-old man in Clatsop County had underlying conditions or conditions are still being determined. |
| December 25 | 908 | 107,718 | 7 | 1,422 | | Deaths: a 63-year-old man in Multnomah County, an 88-year-old man in Lane County, an 87-year-old man in Deschutes County, a 63-year-old man in Marion County, a 65-year-old woman in Multnomah County, an 83-year-old man in Marion County and an 83-year-old man in Marion County. All had underlying conditions. |
| December 26 | 612 | 108,326 | 0 | 1,422 | | Deaths: None. |
| December 27 | 1,416 | 109,725 | 5 | 1,427 | | Deaths: a 71-year-old woman in Jackson County, a 71-year-old woman in Jackson County, a 59-year-old man in Columbia County, an 88-year-old woman in Deschutes County and a 98-year-old woman in Marion County. All had underlying conditions. |
| December 28 | 865 | 110,545 | 6 | 1,433 | | Deaths: a 79-year-old man in Jackson County, a 79-year-old man in Jackson County, a 67-year-old woman in Lane County, an 85-year-old man in Lane County, an 87-year-old woman in Lane County and a 77-year-old woman in Lane County. All had underlying conditions. |
| December 29 | 713 | 111,227 | 16 | 1,449 | | Deaths: a 74-year-old man in Columbia County, a 61-year-old man in Douglas County, a 63-year-old woman in Harney County, a 92-year-old man in Hood River County, an 86-year-old man in Jackson County, a 71-year-old man in Jefferson County, a 51-year-old woman in Josephine County, a 72-year-old man in Josephine County, a 78-year-old woman in Lane County, a 76-year-old man in Lane County, a 90-year-old woman in Multnomah County, a 95-year-old woman in Multnomah County, a 79-year-old woman in Polk County, a 90-year-old woman in Polk County, an 85-year-old woman in Polk County and an 84-year-old man in Washington County. All had underlying conditions or conditions are still being determined. |
| December 30 | 1,052 | 112,260 | 19 | 1,468 | | Deaths: a 92-year-old woman in Clackamas County, a 74-year-old man in Coos County, an 88-year-old man in Coos County, an 86-year-old woman in Coos County, a 93-year-old woman in Hood River County, a 66-year-old woman in Hood River County, a 67-year-old man in Jackson County, an 84-year-old man in Jackson County, a 100-year-old woman in Lane County, a 73-year-old woman in Multnomah County, a 72-year-old man in Multnomah County, an 86-year-old woman in Marion County, a 92-year-old man in Multnomah County, an 85-year-old woman in Polk County, a 79-year-old woman in Polk County, a 67-year-old man in Union County, an 83-year-old man in Washington County, a 45-year-old woman in Washington County and an 87-year-old man in Wheeler County. All had underlying conditions or conditions are still being determined. |
| December 31, 2020 | 1,682 | 113,909 | 9 | 1,477 | | Deaths: an 82-year-old man in Multnomah County, an 88-year-old woman in Multnomah County, a 72-year-old man in Douglas County, an 80-year-old woman in Klamath County, a 62-year-old woman in Klamath County, a 64-year-old man in Marion County, a 71-year-old woman in Marion County, a 66-year-old man in Umatilla County, an 82-year-old woman in Jackson County. All had underlying conditions or conditions are still being determined. |
| Jan 1, 2021 | 1,446 | 115,339 | 13 | 1,490 | | Deaths: a 70-year-old woman in Washington County, a 55-year-old man in Multnomah County, a 70-year-old woman in Multnomah County, a 99-year-old woman in Multnomah County, a 74-year-old man in Marion County, a 74-year-old man in Marion County, an 86-year-old woman in Marion County, an 84-year-old woman in Lane County, a 70-year-old woman in Jefferson County, an 85-year-old woman in Hood River County, an 88-year-old man in Hood River County, an 89-year-old woman in Coos County and a 63-year-old woman in Columbia County. All but the 86-year-old woman in Marion County had underlying conditions or conditions are still being determined. |
| Jan 2 | 1,010 | 116,348 | 2 | 1,492 | | Deaths: a 75-year-old woman in Hood River County and a 95-year-old woman in Douglas County. All had underlying conditions or conditions are still being determined. |
| Jan 3 | 1,421 | 117,775 | 8 | 1,500 | | Deaths: an 82-year-old man in Coos County, a 76-year-old man in Marion County, an 88-year-old woman in Marion County, a 77-year-old woman in Polk County, an 81-year-old man in Polk County, a 79-year-old woman in Polk County, a 77-year-old woman in Union County and an 88-year-old woman in Washington County. All had underlying conditions . |
| Jan 4 | 728 | 118,453 | 6 | 1,506 | | Deaths: an 83-year-old woman in Lane County, a 92-year-old woman in Linn County, a 90-year-old woman in Multnomah County, a 47-year-old man in Washington County, an 81-year-old woman in Washington County and a 92-year-old woman in Coos County. All had underlying conditions or conditions are still being determined. |
| Jan 5 | 1,059 | 119,488 | 44 | 1,550 | | Deaths: an 87-year-old man in Tillamook County, a 54-year-old man in Clackamas County, a 92-year-old man in Clackamas County, an 81-year-old woman in Columbia County, a 49-year-old man in Coos County, an 83-year-old man in Deschutes County, an 87-year-old man in Deschutes County, an 86-year-old man in Douglas County, a 53-year-old woman in Harney County, a 93-year-old woman in Jackson County, a 96-year-old man in Jackson County, an 80-year-old woman in Hood River County, a 76-year-old woman in Hood River County, a 78-year-old woman in Hood River County, a 76-year-old man in Jefferson County, an 84-year-old man in Jefferson County, a 76-year-old man in Josephine County, a 93-year-old man in Josephine County, a 90-year-old woman in Klamath County, a 77-year-old man in Klamath County, an 87-year-old woman in Klamath County, a 69-year-old man in Lane County, a 56-year-old man in Malheur County, a 78-year-old woman in Marion County, an 80-year-old man in Marion County, a 76-year-old woman in Marion County, a 60-year-old man in Multnomah County, a 95-year-old man in Multnomah County, a 96-year-old woman in Multnomah County, a 95-year-old man in Multnomah County, an 85-year-old man in Multnomah County, a 60-year-old woman in Multnomah County, a 91-year-old man in Multnomah County, a 67-year-old man in Multnomah County, a 68-year-old woman in Multnomah County, a 78-year-old woman in Multnomah County, a 94-year-old man in Umatilla County, a 69-year-old man in Union County, a 54-year-old man in Washington County, a 55-year-old man in Washington County, an 85-year-old woman in Yamhill County, a 42-year-old man in Yamhill County, a 64-year-old man in Linn County and an 87-year-old woman in Linn County. All had underlying conditions or conditions are still being determined. |
| Jan 6 | 764 | 120,223 | 8 | 1,558 | | Deaths: an 87-year-old woman in Washington County, is 78-year-old man in Washington County, an 86-year-old man in Multnomah County, a 53-year-old man in Josephine County, a 69-year-old man in Josephine County, a 64-year-old man in Jackson County, a 60-year-old man in Douglas County and a 95-year-old woman in Crook County. All had underlying conditions. |
| Jan 7 | 867 | 121,085 | 10 | 1,568 | | Deaths: an 88-year-old woman in Marion County, a 74-year-old man in Clackamas County, an 85-year-old woman in Tillamook County, a 56-year-old man in Umatilla County, an 87-year-old man in Washington County, an 88-year-old man in Washington County, a 72-year-old woman in Yamhill County, a 73-year-old man in Linn County, an 88-year-old man in Josephine County and an 81-year-old man in Josephine County. All had underlying conditions or conditions are still being determined. |
| Jan 8 | 1,755 | 122,847 | 7 | 1,575 | | Deaths: a 91-year-old woman in Clackamas County, a 76-year-old man in Jackson County, 70-year-old man in Josephine county (originally reported in Jackson County), a 68-year-old woman in Marion County, a 50-year-old man in Umatilla County, a 91-year-old man in Washington County and a 76-year-old man in Lane County. All had underlying conditions. |
| Jan 9 | 1,648 | 124,476 | 28 | 1,603 | | Deaths: a 100-year-old woman in Benton County, an 84-year-old man in Clackamas County, an 82-year-old man in Clackamas County, an 89-year-old man in Deschutes County, a 78-year-old man in Deschutes County, an 80-year-old man in Deschutes County, an 89-year-old man in Jackson County, a 92-year-old woman in Jackson County, a 91-year-old woman in Jackson County, a 98-year-old woman in Klamath County, an 89-year-old woman in Klamath County, a 93-year-old woman in Klamath County, an 88-year-old man in Klamath County, a 95-year-old man in Klamath County, a 70-year-old man in Marion County, an 85-year-old woman in Marion County, an 80-year-old woman in Marion County, an 84-year-old man in Morrow County, a 79-year-old woman in Multnomah County, an 88-year-old woman in Multnomah County, an 86-year-old woman in Multnomah County, a 95-year-old woman in Multnomah County, an 89-year-old woman in Multnomah County, a 68-year-old man in Polk County, a 95-year-old woman in Washington County, an 84-year-old woman in Washington County, an 85-year-old woman in Washington County and a 96-year-old woman in Washington County. All had underlying conditions or conditions are still being determined. |
| Jan 10 | 1,225 | 125,683 | 2 | 1,605 | | Deaths: a 96-year-old woman in Lane County and a 69-year-old man in Multnomah County. Both had underlying conditions. |
| Jan 11 | 939 | 126,607 | 10 | 1,613 | | Deaths: a 73-year-old woman in Jefferson County, a 57-year-old woman in Lane County, an 88-year-old man in Lane County, a 53-year-old man in Lane County, a 91-year-old man in Multnomah County, a 91-year-old woman in Multnomah County, a 74-year-old woman in Multnomah County, a 95-year-old woman in Multnomah County, a 93-year-old woman in Multnomah County and a 98-year-old woman in Washington County. They all had underlying conditions. |
| Jan 12 | 1,203 | 127,780 | 54 | 1,667 | | Deaths: a 75-year-old man in Deschutes County, an 84-year-old man in Deschutes County, a 99-year-old woman in Deschutes County, an 89-year-old man in Deschutes County, a 59-year-old man in Jefferson County, an 80-year-old woman in Jefferson County, an 88-year-old woman in Klamath County, a 69-year-old woman in Klamath County, a 79-year-old woman in Jackson County, an 83-year-old woman in Klamath County, a 91-year-old woman in Klamath County, a 73-year-old woman in Lake County, an 89-year-old man in Lane County, a 96-year-old man in Lane County, a 96-year-old woman in Lane County, a 94-year-old woman in Linn County, an 84-year-old man in Linn County, an 86-year-old woman in Marion County, a 94-year-old woman in Marion County, a 79-year-old man in Marion County, an 87-year-old man in Marion County, a 101-year-old woman in Marion County, a 71-year-old man in Marion County, an 85-year-old woman in Marion County, a 94-year-old woman in Marion County, a 59-year-old man in Marion County, a 73-year-old woman in Multnomah County, a 65-year-old man in Multnomah County, a 77-year-old woman in Multnomah County, a 90-year-old man in Multnomah County, a 95-year-old man in Multnomah County, an 80-year-old man in Multnomah County, a 77-year-old woman in Multnomah County, a 33-year-old woman in Multnomah County, a 78-year-old woman in Multnomah County, a 55-year-old woman in Multnomah County, a 95-year-old man in Polk County, a 63-year-old woman in Umatilla County, a 97-year-old woman in Wasco County, an 88-year-old woman in Washington County, a 96-year-old woman in Washington County, an 88-year-old woman in Yamhill County, an 87-year-old man in Yamhill County, a 63-year-old woman in Yamhill County, a 30-year-old woman in Josephine County, a 72-year-old man in Clackamas County, a 91-year-old woman in Coos County, an 85-year-old man in Columbia County, an 85-year-old man in Clatsop County, an 86-year-old man in Clackamas County, a 49-year-old woman in Clackamas County, a 65-year-old man in Clackamas County, an 88-year-old man in Clackamas County and a 100-year-old man in Clackamas County. Today's death toll ties the highest day total we have yet seen. All had underlying conditions or conditions are still being determined. |
| Jan 13 | 1,346 | 129,109 | 41 | 1,708 | | Deaths: an 81-year-old woman in Clackamas County, a 79-year-old man in Clackamas County, a 98-year-old man in Clackamas County, a 78-year-old man in Columbia County, a 77-year-old woman in Crook County, an 89-year-old man in Curry County, an 84-year-old woman in Douglas County, an 80-year-old man in Jackson County, a 69-year-old woman in Jefferson County, a 66-year-old woman in Lane County, a 94-year-old man in Lane County, an 89-year-old woman in Marion County, a 19-year-old man in Marion County (the youngest death in Oregon to date), a 79-year-old woman in Multnomah County, a 78-year-old woman in Benton County, a 75-year-old woman in Multnomah County, a 64-year-old man in Multnomah County, an 88-year-old woman in Multnomah County, a 76-year-old woman in Multnomah County, a 94-year-old woman in Multnomah County, a 70-year-old woman in Multnomah County, a 50-year-old man in Multnomah County, a 70-year-old man in Multnomah County, a 69-year-old man in Multnomah County, an 86-year-old man in Multnomah County, an 82-year-old man in Multnomah County, a 77-year-old man in Multnomah County, a 70-year-old man in Polk County, a 75-year-old woman in Polk County, a 58-year-old woman in Polk County, a 69-year-old man in Umatilla County, an 89-year-old man in Umatilla County, a 72-year-old man in Umatilla County, an 87-year-old man in Washington County, an 82-year-old man in Washington County, a 95-year-old man in Washington County, a 93-year-old man in Washington County, an 82-year-old man in Washington County, a 92-year-old woman in Yamhill County, a 75-year-old woman in Yamhill County and a 27-year-old man in Washington County. All had underlying conditions or conditions are still being determined. |
| Jan 14 | 1,152 | 130,246 | 29 | 1,737 | | Deaths: a 67-year-old woman in Clackamas County, a 91-year-old woman in Clackamas County, an 85-year-old woman in Clackamas County, a 96-year-old woman in Clackamas County, a 91-year-old woman in Clackamas County, a 68-year-old man in Deschutes County, an 81-year-old woman in Hood River County, a 76-year-old woman in Jefferson County, a 77-year-old woman in Jackson County, a 95-year-old woman in Lane County, a 58-year-old man in Lane County, an 89-year-old woman in Linn County, an 85-year-old woman in Linn County, a 94-year-old woman in Linn County, an 80-year-old man in Linn County, an 83-year-old woman in Multnomah County, a 65-year-old woman in Multnomah County, an 88-year-old woman in Multnomah County, a 77-year-old woman in Multnomah County, a 98-year-old woman in Multnomah County, a 79-year-old woman in Multnomah County, a 75-year-old man in Multnomah County, an 80-year-old woman in Multnomah County, a 60-year-old man in Umatilla County, an 84-year-old man in Washington County, an 86-year-old man in Washington County, an 82-year-old man in Yamhill County, a 68-year-old man in Yamhill County and a 95-year-old woman in Clackamas County. All had underlying conditions or conditions are still being determined. |
| Jan 15 | 1,067 | 131,313 | 21 | 1,758 | | Deaths: an 85-year-old man in Clackamas County, an 83-year-old man in Deschutes County, a 94-year-old woman in Josephine County, a 68-year-old man in Klamath County, a 74-year-old man in Klamath County, an 87-year-old woman in Klamath County, a 77-year-old man in Klamath County, a 78-year-old man in Morrow County, 84-year-old woman in Multnomah County, a 52-year-old woman in Multnomah County, an 83-year-old woman in Multnomah County, a 74-year-old woman in Multnomah County, a 96-year-old woman in Multnomah County, an 85-year-old woman in Multnomah County, a 72-year-old man in Multnomah County, a 71-year-old man in Multnomah County, a 78-year-old woman in Umatilla County, an 84-year-old woman in Umatilla County, a 76-year-old man in Yamhill County, a 79-year-old woman in Curry County, and a 78-year-old man in Harney County. All had underlying conditions or conditions are still being determined. |
| Jan 16 | 1,173 | 132,412 | 41 | 1,799 | | Deaths: a 32-year-old man in Marion County, a 47-year-old man in Washington County, an 88-year-old man in Deschutes County, an 86-year-old man in Deschutes County, a 91-year-old woman in Marion County, an 89-year-old man in Washington County, a 44-year-old man in Josephine County, a 95-year-old woman in Washington County, an 89-year-old woman in Clackamas County, a 58-year-old woman in Jackson County, a 69-year-old man in Malheur County, an 80-year-old man in Clackamas County, a 79-year-old man in Marion County, a 100-year-old woman in Josephine County, a 92-year-old man in Polk County, an 89-year-old man in Multnomah County, a 71-year-old man in Lane County, an 80-year-old man in Clatsop County, a 77-year-old woman in Benton County, an 80-year-old woman in Klamath County, a 51-year-old man in Clackamas County, an 86-year-old woman in Washington County, an 88-year-old woman in Multnomah County, a 61-year-old woman in Linn County, an 84-year-old woman in Crook County, a 92-year-old man in Marion County, a 56-year-old man in Umatilla County, a 58-year-old woman in Deschutes County, a 94-year-old woman in Polk County, a 71-year-old woman in Washington County, an 86-year-old man in Multnomah County, a 76-year-old woman in Linn County, an 80-year-old woman in Klamath County, an 83-year-old man in Klamath County, a 78-year-old man in Multnomah County, a 69-year-old man in Linn County, a 78-year-old woman in Coos County, a 75-year-old man in Linn County, an 86-year-old woman in Klamath County, a 72-year-old man in Jackson County and a 71-year-old man in Marion County. All had underlying conditions or conditions are still being determined. |
| Jan 17 | 799 | 133,205 | 1 | 1,800 | | Deaths: a 74-year-old woman in Jackson County. She had underlying conditions. |
| Jan 18 | 666 | 133,851 | 3 | 1,803 | | Deaths: a 90-year-old woman in Lane County, a 55-year-old man in Marion County and a 99-year-old woman in Multnomah County. They all had underlying conditions. |
| Jan 19 | 637 | 134,468 | 5 | 1,808 | | Deaths: a 78-year-old man in Deschutes County, a 78-year-old woman in Josephine County, an 81-year-old woman in Lane County, a 91-year-old man in Washington County and a 65-year-old woman in Washington County. They all had underlying conditions. |
| Jan 20 | 704 | 135,142 | 24 | 1,832 | | Deaths: an 80-year-old man in Crook County, a 95-year-old man in Deschutes County, a 47-year-old woman in Deschutes County, a 90-year-old man in Josephine County, an 88-year-old woman in Klamath County, a 92-year-old man in Klamath County, a 76-year-old woman in Klamath County, an 88-year-old man in Klamath County, a 99-year-old woman in Klamath County, a 69-year-old man in Klamath County, a 61-year-old man in Linn County, a 71-year-old man in Linn County, a 99-year-old man in Linn County, a 64-year-old man in Malheur County, a 63-year-old man in Marion County, a 70-year-old man in Marion County, an 80-year-old man in Marion County, an 81-year-old man in Multnomah County, an 88-year-old woman in Washington County, a 73-year-old man in Umatilla County, a 62-year-old man in Umatilla County, an 82-year-old woman in Umatilla County, a 95-year-old man in Washington County and an 85-year-old man in Yamhill County. All had underlying conditions or conditions are still being determined. |
| Jan 21 | 849 | 135,973 | 11 | 1,843 | | Deaths: a 78-year-old woman in Clackamas County, a 94-year-old woman in Jackson County, a 90-year-old man in Jackson County, a 79-year-old woman in Jackson County, a 77-year-old man in Jackson County, a 100-year-old woman in Jackson County, a 90-year-old woman in Lane County, a 69-year-old man in Lane County, a 65-year-old man in Lane County, a 52-year-old woman in Washington County and a 66-year-old woman in Yamhill County. All had underlying conditions. |
| Jan 22 | 877 | 136,839 | 22 | 1,865 | | Deaths: an 89-year-old man in Clackamas County, a 90-year-old woman in Clackamas County, an 87-year-old man in Deschutes County, a 46-year-old man in Harney County, a 56-year-old man in Harney County, an 87-year-old woman in Jackson County, a 73-year-old man in Jackson County, a 67-year-old woman in Jackson County, an 82-year-old woman in Jackson County, a 69-year-old man in Jackson County, an 80-year-old woman in Klamath County, an 80-year-old man in Klamath County, an 84-year-old man in Josephine County, an 80-year-old man in Multnomah County, a 70-year-old man in Umatilla County, a 73-year-old man in Washington County, an 81-year-old woman in Washington County, a 61-year-old man in Union County, a 60-year-old woman in Marion County, a 68-year-old man in Marion County, a 61-year-old woman in Marion County and a 57-year-old man in Marion County. All had underlying conditions or conditions are still being determined. |
| Jan 23 | 775 | 137,600 | 13 | 1,877 | | Deaths: a 69-year-old woman in Crook County, a 79-year-old woman in Crook County, an 84-year-old man in Douglas County, an 87-year-old man in Malheur County, a 71-year-old man in Malheur County, an 84-year-old man in Marion County, a 62-year-old man in Multnomah County, an 87-year-old woman in Multnomah County, a 77-year-old woman in Multnomah County, a 63-year-old man in Jackson County, an 84-year-old woman in Washington County, a 53-year-old woman in Yamhill County and a 76-year-old man in Umatilla County. All had underlying conditions or conditions are still being determined. |
| Jan 24 | 582 | 138,168 | 3 | 1,880 | | Deaths: a 66-year-old man in Douglas County, a 90-year-old woman in Jackson County and a 58-year-old man in Marion County. All had underlying conditions or conditions are still being determined. |
| Jan 25 | 435 | 138,587 | 2 | 1,882 | | Deaths: an 81-year-old man in Linn County and a 90-year-old woman in Yamhill County. All had underlying conditions or conditions are still being determined. |
| Jan 26 | 796 | 139,355 | 22 | 1,904 | | Deaths: a 74-year-old man in Clackamas County, an 84-year-old man in Crook County, a 79-year-old man in Coos County, an 84-year-old woman in Deschutes County, a 96-year-old woman in Douglas County, an 82-year-old man in Douglas County, an 82-year-old woman in Hood River County, a 64-year-old man in Jackson County, a 72-year-old man in Klamath County, a 68-year-old man in Klamath County, a 58-year-old man in Marion County, a 76-year-old woman in Marion County, a 70-year-old woman in Multnomah County, an 86-year-old woman in Multnomah County, a 70-year-old man in Umatilla County, an 88-year-old woman in Washington County, a 40-year-old woman in Washington County, a 35-year-old woman in Washington County, a 73-year-old woman in Washington County, an 86-year-old woman in Yamhill County, a 77-year-old woman in Yamhill County and a 27-year-old woman in Hood River County. All had underlying conditions or conditions are still being determined. |
| Jan 27 | 731 | 140,063 | 20 | 1,924 | | Deaths: Starting today, OHA will no longer list individual cases of COVID-19 related deaths in Oregon in its daily media releases. |
| Jan 28 | 750 | 140,783 | 6 | 1,930 | | |
| Jan 29 | 976 | 141,729 | 8 | 1,938 | | |
| Jan 30 | 707 | 142,416 | 19 | 1,957 | | |
| Jan 31 | 964 | 143,373 | 1 | 1,958 | | Data from these two days were lumped together in Oregon Health Authority reports because their data server was undergoing an upgrade during the Jan 31 reporting period. Deaths: a 72-year-old man in Clackamas County, a 90-year-old woman in Clackamas County, an 88-year-old woman in Clackamas County, a 90-year-old woman in Deschutes County, an 82-year-old woman in Deschutes County, a 79-year-old woman in Deschutes County, a 68-year-old woman in Deschutes County, a 70-year-old man in Douglas County, an 81-year-old woman in Hood River County, a 93-year-old woman in Jackson County, an 86-year-old woman in Jackson County, a 91-year-old man in Jackson County, an 88-year-old man in Columbia County, an 81-year-old man in Jackson County, an 83-year-old woman in Klamath County, an 89-year-old woman in Klamath County, a 74-year-old man in Klamath County, an 86-year-old woman in Klamath County, an 87-year-old woman in Lake County, a 71-year-old woman in Lincoln County, an 85-year-old woman in Malheur County, a 75-year-old man in Marion County, a 43-year-old man in Marion County, a 69-year-old man in Marion County, a 64-year-old woman in Marion County, a 76-year-old woman in Marion County, an 88-year-old man in Marion County, an 84-year-old woman in Marion County, a 90-year-old man in Marion County, an 86-year-old man in Marion County, an 82-year-old man in Morrow County, a 72-year-old man in Washington County, a 67-year-old woman in Washington County, a 53-year-old man in Washington County, a 97-year-old woman in Washington County, a 74-year-old man in Washington County, an 84-year-old woman in Union County, a 79-year-old man in Polk County, a 69-year-old man in Multnomah County, a 53-year-old woman in Multnomah County, a 59-year-old woman in Multnomah County, a 75-year-old man in Multnomah County, a 78-year-old man in Multnomah County, an 85-year-old woman in Multnomah County, a 93-year-old woman in Multnomah County, a 93-year-old woman in Multnomah County, a 95-year-old woman in Washington County, a 73-year-old woman in Washington County, a 95-year-old woman in Washington County, a 67-year-old woman in Yamhill County, a 66-year-old man in Yamhill County, a 98-year-old woman in Yamhill County, an 85-year-old woman in Yamhill County and an 81-year-old man in Crook County. Details from today's reported deaths, along with the 53 that were not included in the daily media releases between Jan 27 and Jan 30, are posted in this update. |
| Feb 1 | 964 | 143,373 | 1 | 1,958 | | |
| Feb 2 | 619 | 143,978 | 23 | 1,981 | | Deaths: an 87-year-old man in Clackamas County, a 96-year-old woman in Clackamas County, a 95-year-old woman in Clackamas County, a 61-year-old man in Clackamas County, a 96-year-old man in Clackamas County, an 85-year-old woman in Clackamas County, a 90-year-old woman in Hood River County, an 87-year-old woman in Columbia County, a 61-year-old woman in Lane County, a 70-year-old man in Jackson County, a 66-year-old man in Jackson County, a 64-year-old man in Marion County, a 62-year-old man in Marion County, a 68-year-old woman in Marion County, a 79-year-old man in Marion County, a 58-year-old man in Morrow County, an 83-year-old man in Multnomah County, a 66-year-old man in Multnomah County, an 87-year-old man in Multnomah County, a 73-year-old woman in Multnomah County, a 95-year-old woman in Multnomah County, an 81-year-old woman in Multnomah County and a 69-year-old woman in Yamhill County. All had underlying conditions or conditions are still being determined. |
| Feb 3 | 649 | 144,605 | 10 | 1,991 | | Deaths: a 59-year-old man in Baker County, a 99-year-old woman in Clackamas County, a 64-year-old woman in Clackamas County, a 71-year-old woman in Deschutes County, a 94-year-old woman in Jackson County, an 86-year-old man in Marion County, a 65-year-old man in Umatilla County, an 81-year-old woman in Multnomah County, a 72-year-old man in Umatilla County and a 98-year-old woman in Yamhill County. All had underlying conditions or conditions are still being determined. |
| Feb 4 | 730 | 145,320 | 7 | 1,998 | | Deaths: an 86-year-old man in Baker County, a 78-year-old man in Deschutes County, a 77-year-old man in Jackson County, a 77-year-old woman in Marion County, a 91-year-old woman in Marion County, a 99-year-old woman in Wasco County and a 66-year-old man in Coos County. All except the 86-year-old man in Baker County had underlying conditions. |
| Feb 5 | 846 | 146,138 | 5 | 2,003 | | Deaths: a 65-year-old man in Linn County, a 67-year-old woman in Hood River County, a 90-year-old woman in Yamhill County, a 69-year-old man in Josephine County and an 82-year-old man in Multnomah County. All had underlying conditions. |
| Feb 6 | 624 | 146,741 | 17 | 2,019 | | Deaths: a 97-year-old man in Yamhill County, an 82-year-old woman in Josephine County, an 86-year-old man in Crook County, an 85-year-old man in Polk County, a 64-year-old woman in Multnomah County, an 85-year-old man in Curry County, a 69-year-old man in Clackamas County, a 71-year-old woman in Lane County, a 63-year-old woman in Washington County, a 65-year-old woman in Morrow County, an 88-year-old man in Wallowa County, a 79-year-old man in Multnomah County, a 76-year-old woman in Douglas County, a 76-year-old man in Josephine County, an 82-year-old woman in Washington County, a 68-year-old woman in Multnomah County and a 76-year-old woman in Washington County. All except the 65-year-old woman in Morrow County had underlying conditions or conditions are still being determined. |
| Feb 7 | 393 | 147,122 | 14 | 2,023 | | Deaths: an 82-year-old in Multnomah County, an 89-year-old woman in Jackson County, a 78-year-old woman in Marion County and a 93-year-old man in Marion County. All had underlying conditions or conditions are still being determined. |
| Feb 8 | 305 | 147,419 | 1 | 2,024 | | Death: a 67-year-old woman in Lane County. Presence of underlying conditions is being determined. |
| Feb 9 | 529 | 147,932 | 7 | 2,031 | | Deaths: a 68-year-old woman in Columbia County, a 92-year-old woman in Deschutes County, a 92-year-old man in Josephine County, an 82-year-old man in Lane County, a 79-year-old man in Marion County, a 77-year-old woman in Union County and a 44-year-old man in Hood River County. All had underlying conditions or conditions are still being determined. |
| Feb 10 | 555 | 148,475 | 13 | 2,044 | | Deaths: a 49-year-old man in Clatsop County, an 85-year-old man in Douglas County, a 73-year-old man in Douglas County, an 84-year-old man in Lane County, an 84-year-old man in Lane County, an 89-year-old man in Klamath County, a 73-year-old man in Multnomah County, an 81-year-old man in Multnomah County, a 94-year-old woman in Multnomah County, a 62-year-old man in Washington County, a 101-year-old woman in Washington County, a 96-year-old woman in Washington County and a 90-year-old woman in Washington County. All had underlying conditions or conditions are still being determined. |
| Feb 11 | 621 | 149,082 | 12 | 2,056 | | Deaths: a 79-year-old man in Clackamas County, a 96-year-old man in Jackson County, a 93-year-old man in Deschutes County, an 83-year-old woman in Josephine County, a 91-year-old woman in Marion County, a 74-year-old woman in Multnomah County, a 58-year-old man in Multnomah County, a 67-year-old man in Multnomah County, a 72-year-old man in Multnomah County, a 66-year-old man in Washington County, an 88-year-old man in Washington County and a 76-year-old woman in Jefferson County. All except the 76-year-old woman in Jefferson County had underlying conditions or conditions are still being determined. |
| Feb 12 | 517 | 149,576 | 38 | 2,094 | | Deaths: an 89-year-old woman in Clackamas County, a 67-year-old woman in Clackamas County, an 87-year-old woman in Clackamas County, a 61-year-old man in Clackamas County, a 103-year-old woman in Clackamas County, a 74-year-old woman in Deschutes County, a 74-year-old woman in Deschutes County, a 76-year-old man in Deschutes County, a 92-year-old woman in Josephine County, a 74-year-old man in Josephine County, a 98-year-old man in Josephine County, an 82-year-old woman in Klamath County, an 83-year-old man in Lane County, a 48-year-old man in Lane County, a 95-year-old man in Linn County, an 85-year-old woman in Linn County, a 78-year-old man in Malheur County, a 98-year-old woman in Marion County, an 84-year-old man in Marion County, an 85-year-old woman in Multnomah County, a 75-year-old man in Multnomah County, a 73-year-old woman in Multnomah County, a 91-year-old man in Multnomah County, a 93-year-old woman in Multnomah County, a 75-year-old woman in Multnomah County, a 97-year-old man in Multnomah County, an 84-year-old man in Multnomah County, a 76-year-old man in Multnomah County, a 75-year-old man in Multnomah County, a 69-year-old man in Multnomah County, an 84-year-old man in Washington County, a 91-year-old man in Washington County, a 75-year-old man in Washington County, a 79-year-old woman in Washington County, an 86-year-old man in Washington County, a 95-year-old woman in Washington County, a 71-year-old man in Umatilla County and a 95-year-old man in Yamhill County. All had underlying conditions or conditions are still being determined. |
| Feb 13 | 474 | 150,034 | 43 | 2,137 | | Deaths: a 79-year-old man in Benton County, a 61-year-old woman in Benton County, a 93-year-old woman in Clackamas County, an 88-year-old woman in Clackamas County, a 31-year-old man in Clackamas County, an 82-year-old woman in Clackamas County, a 68-year-old man in Clackamas County, an 81-year-old woman in Clackamas County, an 82-year-old man in Clackamas County, an 83-year-old woman in Clackamas County, a 70-year-old man in Clackamas County, a 69-year-old woman in Crook County, an 86-year-old man in Crook County, a 79-year-old woman in Deschutes County, a 77-year-old woman in Deschutes County, an 83-year-old man in Deschutes County, a 72-year-old woman in Deschutes County, a 91-year-old woman in Hood River County, a 101-year-old woman in Hood River County, a 55-year-old man in Jefferson County, an 85-year-old man in Linn County, a 70-year-old man in Malheur County, an 83-year-old woman in Marion County, a 67-year-old woman in Marion County, an 84-year-old man in Marion County, an 83-year-old woman in Marion County, an 89-year-old woman in Multnomah County, a 76-year-old woman in Multnomah County, a 92-year-old man in Multnomah County, an 87-year-old man in Multnomah County, a 62-year-old man in Multnomah County, a 91-year-old woman in Multnomah County, a 57-year-old woman in Multnomah County, a 68-year-old woman in Multnomah County, a 73-year-old woman in Multnomah County, a 98-year-old man in Umatilla County, a 74-year-old man in Umatilla County, a 93-year-old woman in Washington County, an 87-year-old man in Wasco County, an 84-year-old man in Yamhill County, a 46-year-old man in Yamhill County, an 85-year-old man in Josephine County and a 93-year-old woman in Josephine County. All except the 86-year-old man in Crook County had underlying conditions or conditions are still being determined. |
| Feb 14 | 254 | 150,281 | 0 | 2,137 | | Deaths: None. |
| Feb 15 | 184 | 150,464 | 0 | 2,137 | | Deaths: None. |
| Feb 16 | 411 | 150,875 | 1 | 2,138 | | Deaths: an 85-year-old man in Marion County. He had underlying conditions. |
| Feb 17 | 473 | 151,257 | 5 | 2,143 | | Deaths: a 72-year-old man in Jackson County, a 76-year-old man in Lincoln County, an 89-year-old woman in Marion County, a 53-year-old woman in Multnomah County and an 88-year-old man in Washington County. They all had underlying conditions. |
| Feb 18 | 466 | 151,723 | 6 | 2,149 | | Deaths: a 76-year-old man in Deschutes County, an 84-year-old man in Deschutes County, an 89-year-old woman in Marion County, a 68-year-old man in Marion County, an 84-year-old man in Josephine County, a 72-year-old man in Coos County and an infant boy in Umatilla County (the youngest child death in Oregon to date). They all had underlying conditions. |
| Feb 19 | 492 | 152,190 | 0 | 2,149 | | Deaths: None. |
| Feb 20 | 536 | 152,711 | 5 | 2,154 | | Deaths: an 86-year-old man in Jackson County, a 69-year-old man in Linn County, a 66-year-old woman in Marion County, a 70-year-old man in Multnomah County and a 90-year-old man in Washington County. All had underlying conditions or conditions are still being determined. |
| Feb 21 | 111 | 152,818 | 1 | 2,155 | | Deaths: an 84-year-old man in Clackamas County. He had underlying conditions. |
| Feb 22 | 324 | 153,134 | 0 | 2,155 | | Deaths: None. |
| Feb 23 | 528 | 153,645 | 8 | 2,162 | | Deaths: a 92-year-old man in Clackamas County, a 74-year-old man in Josephine County, a 47-year-old man in Lane County, a 76-year-old man in Lincoln County, a 77-year-old man in Marion County, a 93-year-old woman in Marion County, an 82-year-old woman in Multnomah County and a 63-year-old woman in Umatilla County. All had underlying conditions or conditions are still being determined. |
| Feb 24 | 437 | 154,062 | 32 | 2,194 | | Deaths: a 69-year-old man in Clackamas County, an 89-year-old woman in Clackamas County, a 67-year-old woman in Clackamas County, an 89-year-old woman in Clackamas County, a 51-year-old woman in Clackamas County, a 71-year-old woman in Coos County, a 74-year-old woman in Douglas County, a 93-year-old man in Jackson County, an 87-year-old woman in Jackson County, a 91-year-old woman in Lane County, a 68-year-old woman in Lane County, a 58-year-old woman in Marion County, an 86-year-old woman in Marion County, a 77-year-old woman in Morrow County, an 80-year-old man in Multnomah County, a 67-year-old woman in Multnomah County, a 74-year-old man in Multnomah County, an 82-year-old man in Multnomah County, a 77-year-old man in Multnomah County, a 90-year-old woman in Multnomah County, an 82-year-old woman in Multnomah County, a 90-year-old woman in Multnomah County, an 88-year-old man in Multnomah County, an 89-year-old man in Linn County, a 77-year-old man in Washington County, a 97-year-old man in Multnomah County, a 92-year-old man in Multnomah County, an 83-year-old man in Wasco County, an 84-year-old woman in Washington County, a 93-year-old man in Washington County, an 88-year-old woman in Yamhill County and a 91-year-old woman in Yamhill County. All except the 92-year-old man in Multnomah County had underlying conditions or conditions are still being determined. |
| Feb 25 | 553 | 154,554 | 10 | 2,204 | | Deaths: a 96-year-old woman in Deschutes County, a 71-year-old woman in Douglas County, a 94-year-old man in Jackson County, a 63-year-old woman in Jefferson County, a 71-year-old man in Klamath County, an 88-year-old man in Lane County, an 87-year-old man in Lane County, an 88-year-old man in Marion County, a 68-year-old woman in Multnomah County and a 59-year-old woman in Multnomah County. All except the 63-year-old woman in Jefferson County had underlying conditions or conditions are still being determined. |
| Feb 26 | 336 | 154,878 | 2 | 2,206 | | Deaths: a 73-year-old man in Douglas County and a 55-year-old man in Umatilla County. Both had underlying conditions or conditions are still being determined. |
| Feb 27 | 455 | 155,315 | 2 | 2,208 | | Deaths: a 92-year-old man in Jackson County and a 61-year-old man in Josephine County. Both had underlying conditions. |
| Feb 28 | 292 | 155,597 | 0 | 2,208 | | Deaths: None. |
| Mar 1 | 197 | 155,787 | 4 | 2,212 | | Deaths: an 89-year-old man in Josephine County, a 76-year-old man in Josephine County, a 92-year-old woman in Lane County and an 88-year-old man in Multnomah County. They all had underlying conditions. |
| Mar 2 | 269 | 156,037 | 13 | 2,225 | | Deaths: an 87-year-old woman in Baker County, an 88-year-old man in Baker County, a 100-year-old man in Clackamas County, a 91-year-old woman in Douglas County, a 91-year-old woman in Deschutes County, a 27-year-old man in Jackson County, a 90-year-old man in Lane County, a 72-year-old woman in Linn County, an 83-year-old man in Multnomah County, a 57-year-old man in Multnomah County, a 58-year-old woman in Multnomah County, a 79-year-old man in Yamhill County and a 78-year-old woman in Coos County. All except the 79-year-old man in Yamhill County had underlying conditions or conditions are still being determined. |
| Mar 3 | 276 | 156,287 | 27 | 2,252 | | Deaths: a 101-year-old woman in Clackamas County, a 96-year-old man in Clackamas County, a 100-year-old man in Clackamas County, an 80-year-old man in Clackamas County, a 66-year-old man in Clackamas County, a 97-year-old woman in Clackamas County, a 95-year-old man in Clackamas County, an 85-year-old woman in Deschutes County, a 65-year-old woman in Jackson County, a 50-year-old man in Multnomah County, an 82-year-old man in Multnomah County, an 83-year-old man in Multnomah County, a 71-year-old woman in Multnomah County, an 89-year-old man in Lane County, an 80-year-old woman in Multnomah County, an 85-year-old man in Multnomah County, a 75-year-old woman in Multnomah County, a 74-year-old woman in Multnomah County, an 89-year-old woman in Benton County, an 82-year-old man in Multnomah County, an 80-year-old man in Yamhill County, an 85-year-old woman in Yamhill County, an 88-year-old man in Yamhill County, a 47-year-old man in Wallowa County, a 100-year-old man in Multnomah County, a 77-year-old man in Josephine County and an 84-year-old woman in Polk County. All had underlying conditions or conditions are still being determined. |
| Mar 4 | 392 | 156,673 | 32 | 2,284 | | Deaths: a 90-year-old woman in Clackamas County, a 78-year-old woman in Clackamas County, a 90-year-old woman in Clackamas County, an 87-year-old man in Clackamas County, a 75-year-old woman in Clackamas County, a 97-year-old woman in Clackamas County, a 62-year-old man in Coos County, an 86-year-old man in Deschutes County, a 93-year-old woman in Deschutes County, a 92-year-old woman in Clackamas County, a 62-year-old man in Jackson County, a 90-year-old man in Jackson County, an 83-year-old man in Jefferson County, a 61-year-old man in Jefferson County, an 84-year-old man in Josephine County, a 78-year-old man in Josephine County, a 39-year-old man in Marion County, a 101-year-old woman in Marion County, an 82-year-old woman in Multnomah County, an 82-year-old woman in Multnomah County, a 48-year-old woman in Multnomah County, a 76-year-old woman in Multnomah County, a 67-year-old man in Multnomah County, a 98-year-old woman in Multnomah County, an 87-year-old man in Multnomah County, a 51-year-old man in Multnomah County, a 73-year-old woman in Polk County, a 45-year-old woman in Washington County, a 60-year-old man in Washington County, a 78-year-old man in Washington County, a 95-year-old man in Washington County and an 88-year-old woman in Yamhill County. All except the 84-year-old man in Josephine County had underlying conditions or conditions are still being determined. |
| Mar 5 | 251 | 156,884 | 9 | 2,293 | | Deaths: a 77-year-old woman in Deschutes County, an 88-year-old woman in Deschutes County, an 82-year-old man in Jackson County, an 80-year-old man in Jackson County, a 64-year-old woman in Josephine County, a 95-year-old man in Lane County, an 88-year-old woman in Lane County, an 84-year-old woman in Polk County and an 81-year-old woman in Washington County. All had underlying conditions. |
| Mar 6 | 202 | 157,079 | 3 | 2,296 | | Deaths: a 58-year-old woman in Benton County, a 75-year-old woman in Clackamas County and an 82-year-old man in Curry County. All had underlying conditions or conditions are still being determined. |
| Mar 7 | 211 | 157,285 | 0 | 2,296 | | Deaths: None. |
| Mar 8 | 234 | 157,515 | 2 | 2,298 | | Deaths: a 73-year-old woman in Lane County and a 75-year-old man in Douglas County. They both had underlying conditions. |
| Mar 9 | 517 | 158,007 | 5 | 2,303 | | Deaths: an 83-year-old man in Jackson County, a 43-year-old man in Marion County, a 64-year-old woman in Baker County, a 62-year-old woman in Multnomah County and a 67-year-old man in Washington County. They all had underlying conditions or conditions are still being determined. |
| Mar 10 | 306 | 158,291 | 2 | 2,305 | | Deaths: a 73-year-old woman in Jackson County and an 85-year-old woman in Marion County. They both had underlying conditions. |
| Mar 11 | 367 | 158,644 | 11 | 2,316 | | Deaths: an 85-year-old man in Baker County, an 87-year-old man in Baker County, an 81-year-old man in Josephine County, a 92-year-old man in Lane County, a 74-year-old man in Marion County, a 93-year-old man in Deschutes County, a 73-year-old woman in Multnomah County, an 87-year-old woman in Polk County, a 43-year-old man in Union County, a 91-year-old woman in Douglas County and a 62-year-old man in Douglas County. They all had underlying conditions or conditions are still being determined. |
| Mar 12 | 402 | 159,037 | 3 | 2,319 | | Deaths: a 93-year-old man in Josephine County, a 70-year-old woman in Deschutes County and a 63-year-old man in Deschutes County. They all had underlying conditions. |
| Mar 13 | 365 | 159,392 | 3 | 2,322 | | Deaths: an 89-year-old man in Clackamas County, a 68-year-old man in Lane County and a 95-year-old man in Multnomah County. They all had underlying conditions or conditions are still being determined. |
| Mar 14 | 234 | 159,617 | 0 | 2,322 | | Deaths: None. |
| Mar 15 | 178 | 159,788 | 2 | 2,324 | | Deaths: a 69-year-old woman in Columbia County and an 85-year-old woman in Columbia County. They both had underlying conditions or conditions are still being determined. |
| Mar 16 | 267 | 160,050 | 22 | 2,346 | | Deaths: an 83-year-old woman in Clackamas County, an 82-year-old woman in Clackamas County, an 83-year-old woman in Clackamas County, a 58-year-old man in Coos County, an 81-year-old man in Baker County, a 46-year-old man in Coos County, a 77-year-old man in Deschutes County, an 85-year-old man in Deschutes County, a 57-year-old man in Jefferson County, a 79-year-old woman in Lane County, a 69-year-old man in Lane County, a 40-year-old man in Linn County, a 91-year-old man in Marion County, a 71-year-old man in Curry County, a 62-year-old woman in Marion County, a 70-year-old man in Multnomah County, a 78-year-old man in Multnomah County, an 88-year-old woman in Multnomah County, a 98-year-old woman in Polk County, an 85-year-old woman in Polk County, an 82-year-old woman in Washington County and a 79-year-old man in Washington County. All except the 81-year-old man in Baker County had underlying conditions or conditions are still being determined. |
| Mar 17 | 239 | 160,259 | 3 | 2,349 | | Deaths: an 86-year-old man in Lane County, an 89-year-old man in Washington County and a 90-year-old woman in Josephine County. All had underlying conditions or conditions are still being determined. |
| Mar 18 | 393 | 160,622 | 4 | 2,353 | | Deaths: a 79-year-old woman in Klamath County, a 44-year-old man in Marion County, a 54-year-old man in Linn County and a 75-year-old man in Lane County. All had underlying conditions. |
| Mar 19 | 381 | 160,994 | 4 | 2,357 | | Deaths: a 66-year-old man in Clatsop County, an 88-year-old woman in Marion County, an 80-year-old man in Marion County and an 89-year-old man in Wasco County. All had underlying conditions or conditions are still being determined. |
| Mar 20 | 339 | 161,320 | 5 | 2,362 | | Deaths: a 78-year-old woman in Lane County, a 75-year-old man in Coos County, a 94-year-old man in Multnomah County, a 70-year-old man in Yamhill County and a 77-year-old woman in Columbia County. All had underlying conditions or conditions are still being determined. |
| Mar 21 | 224 | 161,531 | 1 | 2,363 | | Deaths: an 80-year-old woman in Grant County. She had underlying conditions. |
| Mar 22 | 178 | 161,706 | 2 | 2,365 | | Deaths: a 91-year-old man in Lane County and a 40-year-old woman in Marion County. They both had underlying conditions. |
| Mar 23 | 316 | 162,016 | 2 | 2,367 | | Deaths: an 85-year-old man in Coos County and a 67-year-old woman in Coos County. They both had underlying conditions. |
| Mar 24 | 379 | 162,384 | 1 | 2,368 | | Deaths: an 85-year-old woman in Multnomah County. She had underlying conditions. |
| Mar 25 | 422 | 162,806 | 2 | 2,370 | | Deaths: a 56-year-old woman in Coos County and a 63-year-old woman in Grant County. They both had underlying conditions. |
| Mar 26 | 505 | 163,295 | 3 | 2,373 | | Deaths: a 74-year-old woman in Coos County, an 81-year-old man in Lane County and a 76-year-old man in Douglas County. They all had underlying conditions or conditions are still being determined. |
| Mar 27 | 426 | 163,702 | 2 | 2,375 | | Deaths: an 81-year-old man in Linn County and an 87-year-old woman in Grant County. They both had underlying conditions. |
| Mar 28 | 253 | 163,952 | 0 | 2,375 | | Deaths: None. |
| Mar 29 | 217 | 164,164 | 0 | 2,375 | | Deaths: None. |
| Mar 30 | 415 | 164,570 | 6 | 2,381 | | Deaths: a 65-year-old man in Coos County, a 93-year-old woman in Jackson County, an 85-year-old woman in Marion County, a 42-year-old man in Morrow County, an 80-year-old man in Union County and a 67-year-old woman in Washington County. All had underlying conditions or conditions are still being determined. |
| Mar 31 | 441 | 165,012 | 2 | 2,383 | | Deaths: a 63-year-old woman in Washington County and an 84-year-old woman in Douglas County. They both had underlying conditions. |
| Apr 1 | 521 | 165,524 | 2 | 2,385 | | Deaths: a 78-year-old man in Klamath County and a 48-year-old woman in Union County. They both had underlying conditions. |
| Apr 2 | 499 | 166,013 | 0 | 2,385 | | Deaths: None. |
| Apr 3 | 476 | 166,480 | 6 | 2,391 | | Deaths: a 70-year-old woman in Multnomah County, a 90-year-old man in Lane County, an 87-year-old man in Curry County, an 81-year-old man in Josephine County, an 85-year-old man in Lake County and an 89-year-old woman in Clackamas County. They all had underlying conditions or conditions are still being determined. |
| Apr 4 | 404 | 166,882 | 1 | 2,392 | | Deaths: a 58-year-old man in Lane County. He had underlying conditions. |
| Apr 5 | 248 | 167,128 | 2 | 2,394 | | Deaths: a 98-year-old man in Jackson County and a 90-year-old man in Jackson County. They both had underlying conditions. |
| Apr 6 | 544 | 167,658 | 33 | 2,427 | | Deaths: a 59-year-old woman in Clackamas County, an 80-year-old man in Clackamas County, a 36-year-old woman in Clackamas County, a 93-year-old woman in Coos County, an 84-year-old woman in Columbia County, an 84-year-old woman in Crook County, an 87-year-old woman in Deschutes County, a 61-year-old woman in Douglas County, an 83-year-old man in Douglas County, an 89-year-old man in Douglas County, a 76-year-old man in Douglas County, a 60-year-old man in Josephine County, a 59-year-old woman in Josephine County, a 72-year-old woman in Jefferson County, a 41-year-old man in Lane County, a 73-year-old man in Linn County, an 85-year-old woman in Marion County, an 85-year-old woman in Multnomah County, a 67-year-old man in Multnomah County, a 50-year-old woman in Multnomah County, a 95-year-old woman in Multnomah County, a 94-year-old woman in Multnomah County, a 57-year-old woman in Polk County, a 47-year-old man in Umatilla County, a 94-year-old man in Wasco County, a 93-year-old woman in Washington County, an 80-year-old man in Washington County, a 71-year-old man in Washington County, a 73-year-old man in Washington County, an 88-year-old woman in Yamhill County, a 92-year-old woman in Yamhill County, a 77-year-old man in Yamhill County and a 72-year-old man in Yamhill County. All had underlying conditions or conditions are still being determined. |
| Apr 7 | 481 | 168,128 | 7 | 2,434 | | Deaths: a 60-year-old man in Clackamas County, a 90-year-old woman in Douglas County, a 96-year-old woman in Deschutes County, a 72-year-old man in Jackson County, a 51-year-old woman in Multnomah County, a 67-year-old man in Polk County and a 48-year-old man in Union County. All except the 48-year-old man in Union County had underlying conditions or conditions are still being determined. |
| Apr 8 | 678 | 168,795 | 5 | 2,439 | | Deaths: a 75-year-old man in Baker County, a 66-year-old man in Jackson County, a 64-year-old man in Jackson County, a 94-year-old man in Washington County and a 79-year-old man in Polk County. All had underlying conditions or conditions are still being determined. |
| Apr 9 | 560 | 169,338 | 1 | 2,440 | | Deaths: a 62-year-old man in Clatsop County. He had underlying conditions. |
| Apr 10 | 761 | 170,085 | 0 | 2,440 | | Deaths: None. |
| Apr 11 | 499 | 170,568 | 0 | 2,440 | | Deaths: None. |
| Apr 12 | 294 | 170,850 | 1 | 2,441 | | Deaths: a 47-year-old woman in Multnomah County. She had underlying conditions. |
| Apr 13 | 567 | 171,398 | 5 | 2,446 | | Deaths: a 72-year-old woman in Clackamas County, an 80-year-old woman in Linn County, a 91-year-old woman in Marion County, a 93-year-old man in Multnomah County and a 64-year-old woman in Coos County. They all had underlying conditions or conditions are still being determined. |
| Apr 14 | 816 | 172,206 | 3 | 2,449 | | Deaths: a 66-year-old woman in Tillamook County, an 88-year-old woman in Union County and a 56-year-old man in Klamath County. Only the 88-year-old woman in Union County had underlying conditions. |
| Apr 15 | 733 | 172,931 | 6 | 2,455 | | Deaths: a 93-year-old woman in Clackamas County, a 71-year-old woman in Baker County, a 62-year-old man in Clackamas County, a 52-year-old man in Jackson County, an 82-year-old man in Linn County and an 89-year-old man in Polk County. All had underlying conditions or conditions are still being determined. |
| Apr 16 | 704 | 173,626 | 2 | 2,457 | | Deaths: a 45-year-old man in Columbia County and an 80-year-old man in Klamath County. Both had underlying conditions or conditions are still being determined. |
| Apr 17 | 888 | 174,501 | 3 | 2,460 | | Deaths: a 66-year-old man in Multnomah County, a 68-year-old man in Multnomah County and a 58-year-old man in Yamhill County. All had underlying conditions or conditions are still being determined. |
| Apr 18 | 628 | 175,121 | 0 | 2,460 | | Deaths: None. |
| Apr 19 | 473 | 175,592 | 0 | 2,460 | | Deaths: None. |
| Apr 20 | 580 | 176,157 | 1 | 2,460 | | Deaths: an 82-year-old man from Sherman County. Presence of underlying conditions is being confirmed. |
| Apr 21 | 989 | 177,134 | 6 | 2,466 | | Deaths: an 82-year-old man from Douglas County, a 90-year-old man from Benton County, a 67-year-old man from Jackson County, a 42-year-old man from Jackson County, a 48-year-old man from Multnomah County and a 56-year-old man from Multnomah County. All except the 48-year-old man from Multnomah County had underlying conditions. |
| Apr 22 | 993 | 178,110 | 1 | 2,467 | | Deaths: a 67-year-old man from Linn County. He had underlying conditions. |
| Apr 23 | 1020 | 179,120 | 9 | 2,476 | | Deaths: a 58-year-old man from Douglas County, a 73-year-old man from Clackamas County, a 72-year-old woman from Harney County, a 93-year-old man from Josephine County, a 78-year-old man from Josephine County, an 80-year-old woman from Malheur County, a 64-year-old man from Multnomah County, a 61-year-old man from Umatilla County and an 89-year-old woman from Deschutes County. All had underlying conditions or conditions are still being determined. |
| Apr 24 | 830 | 179,930 | 8 | 2,484 | | Deaths: a 69-year-old man from Clackamas county, a 61-year-old man from Coos county, a 75-year-old man from Douglas county, a 68-year-old man from Hood River county, a 91-year-old man from Marion county, a 91-year-old woman from Multnomah county, a 71-year-old man from Multnomah county and a 46-year-old man from Multnomah county. All had underlying conditions or conditions are still being determined. |
| Apr 25 | 780 | 180,700 | 1 | 2,485 | | Deaths: a 95-year-old man from Josephine County. Presence of underlying conditions are still being determined. |
| Apr 26 | 630 | 181,321 | 1 | 2,486 | | Deaths: an 80-year-old woman from Douglas County. Presence of underlying conditions are still being determined. |
| Apr 27 | 740 | 182,040 | 2 | 2,488 | | Deaths: an 88-year-old woman from Harney County and an 86-year-old woman from Clackamas County. All had underlying conditions. |
| Apr 28 | 888 | 182,916 | 2 | 2,490 | | Deaths: a 78-year-old man from Jackson County and a 73-year-old man from Linn county. All had underlying conditions or conditions are still being determined. |
| Apr 29 | 928 | 183,830 | 1 | 2,491 | | Deaths: an 88-year-old man from Josephine County. He had underlying conditions. |
| Apr 30 | 990 | 184,812 | 4 | 2,495 | | Deaths: a 97-year-old woman from Clackamas County, a 49-year-old man from Josephine County, an 81-year-old man from Malheur County and a 78-year-old woman from Crook County. All had underlying conditions or conditions are still being determined. |
| May 1 | 794 | 185,597 | 3 | 2,498 | | Deaths: a 70-year-old man from Jackson county, a 43-year-old woman from Linn county and an 81-year-old woman from Malheur county. All had underlying conditions or conditions are still being determined. |
| May 2 | 756 | 186,344 | 3 | 2,501 | | Deaths: a 74-year-old man from Marion County, a 72-year-old man from Multnomah County and an 84-year-old man from Marion County. All had underlying conditions or conditions are still being determined. |
| May 3 | 540 | 186,877 | 1 | 2,502 | | Deaths: a 70-year-old woman from Douglas County. She had underlying conditions. |
| May 4 | 748 | 187,611 | 6 | 2,508 | | Deaths: a 61-year-old man from Jefferson County, a 66-year-old man from Clackamas County, a 66-year-old man from Klamath County, a 62-year-old man from Marion County, a 93-year-old man from Multnomah County and a 47-year-old man from Multnomah County. All had underlying conditions or conditions are still being determined. |
| May 5 | 808 | 188,417 | 1 | 2,509 | | Deaths: a 41-year-old man from Lane County. He had underlying conditions. |
| May 6 | 763 | 189,162 | 5 | 2,514 | | Deaths: a 69-year-old woman from Josephine County, a 91-year-old woman from Jackson County, a 50-year-old man from Klamath County, a 63-year-old man from Linn County and a 68-year-old man from Marion County. All had underlying conditions or conditions are still being determined. |
| May 7 | 844 | 189,986 | 8 | 2,522 | | Deaths: a 74-year-old man from Coos County, an 89-year-old man from Grant County, a 60-year-old man from Jackson County, a 57-year-old man from Marion County, an 84-year-old woman from Multnomah County, an 87-year-old man from Multnomah County, a 100-year-old woman from Multnomah County and a 57-year-old man from Jefferson County. All had underlying conditions or conditions are still being determined. |
| May 8 | 833 | 190,804 | 7 | 2,528 | | Deaths: an 87-year-old man from Jackson County, a 90-year-old man from Jackson County, a 62-year-old woman from Marion County, a 65-year-old man from Lane County, a 69-year-old woman from Multnomah County, a 68-year-old man from Multnomah County and a 68-year-old man from Multnomah County. All had underlying conditions or conditions are still being determined. |
| May 9 | 610 | 191,405 | 2 | 2,530 | | Deaths: an 80-year-old woman from Deschutes county and an 83-year-old woman from Multnomah county. All had underlying conditions or conditions are still being determined. |
| May 10 | 388 | 191,774 | 3 | 2,533 | | Deaths: a 90-year-old woman from Multnomah County, a 70-year-old man from Lane County and a 63-year-old man from Josephine County. All had underlying conditions or conditions are still being determined. |
| May 11 | 660 | 192,416 | 16 | 2,549 | | Deaths: a 75-year-old man from Clackamas County, an 84-year-old woman from Clackamas County, an 84-year-old woman from Clackamas County, a 79-year-old man from Jackson County, a 61-year-old woman from Jackson County, a 78-year-old woman from Klamath County, a 69-year-old woman from Klamath County, a 79-year-old man from Klamath County, a 68-year-old man from Malheur County, a 62-year-old woman from Multnomah County, a 65-year-old man from Morrow County, a 67-year-old man from Multnomah County, an 83-year-old man from Multnomah County, an 83-year-old woman from Yamhill County, a 93-year-old man from Washington County and a 58-year-old man from Washington County. All but the last had underlying conditions or conditions are still being determined. |
| May 12 | 616 | 193,014 | 9 | 2,558 | | Deaths: a 46-year-old woman from Clackamas County, a 25-year-old man from Jackson County, an 80-year-old woman from Crook County, a 32-year-old man from Lane County, a 50-year-old woman from Malheur County, a 67-year-old woman from Linn County, a 70-year-old man from Washington County, a 76-year-old man from Jefferson county and an 81-year-old man from Jefferson County. All had underlying conditions or conditions are still being determined. |
| May 13 | 733 | 193,732 | 14 | 2,572 | | Deaths: a 73-year-old man from Columbia County, a 74-year-old man from Clackamas County, an 80-year-old man from Crook County, an 85-year-old man from Douglas County, a 54-year-old man from Jackson County, a 65-year-old man from Jefferson County, an 84-year-old woman from Josephine County, a 78-year-old man from Multnomah County, a 67-year-old man from Multnomah County, an 84-year-old woman from Multnomah County, an 80-year-old woman from Lincoln County, an 80-year-old woman from Linn County, a 66-year-old man from Lane County and a 90-year-old man from Washington County. All except the last had underlying conditions or conditions are still being determined. |
| May 14 | 713 | 194,442 | 10 | 2,582 | | Deaths: an 89-year-old man from Columbia County, a 68-year-old man from Columbia County, an 89-year-old man from Grant County, a 104-year-old woman from Coos County, a 79-year-old man from Lane County, a 54-year-old woman from Marion County, a 63-year-old woman from Multnomah County, a 58-year-old woman from Multnomah County, a 73-year-old man from Polk County and an 83-year-old man from Curry County. All except the 104-year-old woman from Coos County had underlying conditions or conditions are still being determined. |
| May 15 | 751 | 195,179 | 3 | 2,585 | | Deaths: an 80-year-old woman from Coos County, a 79-year-old woman from Hood River County and a 42-year-old woman from Josephine County. All had underlying conditions or conditions are still being determined. |
| May 16 | 507 | 195,684 | 2 | 2,587 | | Deaths: a 74-year-old man from Marion county and an 88-year-old man from Jackson county. Both had underlying conditions. |
| May 17 | 310 | 195,982 | 3 | 2,590 | | Deaths: a 91-year-old woman from Jackson County, a 71-year-old woman from Deschutes County and a 63-year-old man from Marion County. All had underlying conditions. |
| May 18 | 484 | 196,390 | 4 | 2,594 | | Deaths: a 55-year-old woman from Multnomah County, a 71-year-old woman from Linn County, a 70-year-old man from Klamath County and a 55-year-old man from Clackamas County. All had underlying conditions or conditions are still being determined. |
| May 19 | 394 | 196,787 | 7 | 2,601 | | Deaths: an 82-year-old man from Marion County, an 83-year-old woman from Deschutes County, a 93-year-old woman from Linn county, an 80-year-old man from Umatilla County, a 62-year-old man from Multnomah County, a 68-year-old man from Multnomah County and a 67-year-old man from Deschutes County. All had underlying conditions or conditions are still being determined. |
| May 20 | 603 | 197,356 | 5 | 2,606 | | Deaths: an 88-year-old woman from Benton County, a 64-year-old man from Klamath County, a 66-year-old woman from Douglas County, a 74-year-old man from Baker County and a 74-year-old man from Klamath County. All had underlying conditions or conditions are still being determined. |
| May 21 | 504 | 197,851 | 7 | 2,613 | | Deaths: an 82-year-old man from Umatilla County, a 77-year-old man from Clackamas County, a 70-year-old man from Lane County, a 73-year-old woman from Linn County, an 89-year-old man from Deschutes County, a 91-year-old woman from Linn County and an 80-year-old man from Washington County. All had underlying conditions or conditions are still being determined. |
| May 22 | 509 | 198,356 | 5 | 2,618 | | Deaths: a 66-year-old man from Klamath County, a 91-year-old man from Klamath County, a 68-year-old woman from Marion County, an 84-year-old man from Marion County who and a 53-year-old woman from Klamath County. All had underlying conditions or conditions are still being determined. |
| May 23 | 334 | 198,689 | 4 | 2,622 | | Deaths: a 51-year-old man from Clackamas County, a 66-year-old woman from Clackamas County, a 67-year-old woman from Linn County and a 58-year-old woman from Douglas County. All had underlying conditions or conditions are still being determined. |
| May 24 | 284 | 198,972 | 2 | 2,624 | | Deaths: a 70-year-old woman from Jackson County and a 78-year-old man from Jackson County. They both had underlying conditions. |
| May 25 | 424 | 199,391 | 4 | 2,628 | | Deaths: a 75-year-old woman from Clackamas County, a 78-year-old man from Klamath County, an 87-year-old man from Linn County and a 24-year-old man from Lane County. Presence of underlying conditions is still to be determined. |
| May 26 | 399 | 199,784 | 11 | 2,639 | | Deaths: an 89-year-old woman from Coos County, a 91-year-old man from Clackamas County, an 85-year-old woman from Hood River County, a 15-year-old boy from Marion County, a 91-year-old man from Multnomah County, an 81-year-old man from Multnomah County, an 88-year-old woman from Multnomah County, an 82-year-old woman from Washington County, an 89-year-old woman from Washington County, a 77-year-old man from Tillamook County and an 82-year-old woman from Yamhill County. All except the 85-year-old woman from Hood River county had underlying medical conditions or conditions are still being determined. |
| May 27 | 433 | 200,210 | 21 | 2,660 | | Deaths: a 98-year-old man from Benton County, an 87-year-old man from Clackamas County, an 80-year-old woman from Clackamas County, a 78-year-old woman from Clackamas County, a 94-year-old woman from Douglas County, a 93-year-old woman from Deschutes County, a 37-year-old man from Jefferson County, a 55-year-old man from Klamath County, a 78-year-old woman from Klamath County, an 85-year-old woman from Linn County, a 98-year-old woman from Lane County, a 50-year-old man from Linn County, an 81-year-old woman from Marion County, a 69-year-old man from Marion County, a 64-year-old man from Multnomah County, a 93-year-old man from Multnomah County, a 54-year-old man from Multnomah County, a 64-year-old woman from Multnomah County, a 70-year-old man from Multnomah County, a 78-year-old woman from Yamhill County and a 78-year-old man from Washington County. All had underlying conditions or conditions are still being determined. |
| May 28 | 433 | 200,632 | 5 | 2,665 | | Deaths: a 68-year-old woman from Josephine county, a 78-year-old woman from Marion County, an 86-year-old woman from Washington County, a 50-year-old man from Multnomah County and a 62-year-old woman from Multnomah County. All had underlying conditions or conditions are still being determined. |
| May 29 | 376 | 201,004 | 1 | 2,666 | | Deaths: a 79-year-old man from Douglas County. He had no underlying conditions. |
| May 30 | 257 | 201,260 | 2 | 2,668 | | Deaths: a 44-year-old man from Marion county and a 57-year-old man from Marion county. They had underlying conditions or conditions are still being determined. |
| May 30 | 220 | 201,475 | 3 | 2,671 | | Deaths: an 80-year-old man from Douglas County, a 93-year-old man from Jackson County and a 68-year-old man from Linn County. They all underlying conditions or conditions are still being determined. |
| June 1 | 177 | 201,659 | 3 | 2,674 | | Deaths: a 59-year-old man from Lane County, a 75-year-old man from Douglas County and a 46-year-old man from Lane County. They all underlying conditions or conditions are still being determined. |
| June 2 | 356 | 201,996 | 2 | 2,676 | | Deaths: a 53-year-old woman from Jackson County and a 54-year-old man from Douglas County. They both underlying conditions. |
| June 3 | 267 | 202,247 | 7 | 2,683 | | Deaths: a 76-year-old man from Lane County, a 57-year-old woman from Coos County, a 70-year-old woman from Marion County, an 87-year-old man from Multnomah County, a 70-year-old man from Polk County, a 70-year-old man from Polk County and a 61-year-old man from Washington County. All except the first 70-year-old man from Polk County had underlying conditions. |
| June 4 | 436 | 202,675 | 3 | 2,686 | | Deaths: a 58-year-old man from Klamath County, a 75-year-old woman from Harney County and an 84-year-old man from Marion County. They all underlying conditions or conditions are still being determined. |
| June 5 | 330 | 202,995 | 5 | 2,691 | | Deaths: a 79-year-old man from Clackamas County, a 79-year-old woman from Clackamas County, a 72-year-old man from Clackamas County, a 90-year-old woman from Clackamas County and a 78-year-old woman from Klamath County. They all underlying conditions or conditions are still being determined. |
| June 6 | 258 | 203,252 | 3 | 2,694 | | Deaths: an 84-year-old woman from Jackson county, a 57-year-old man from Multnomah county and a 22-year-old man from Washington county. They all underlying conditions or conditions are still being determined. |
| June 7 | 125 | 203,374 | 0 | 2,694 | | Deaths: None. |
| June 8 | 307 | 203,671 | 6 | 2,700 | | Deaths: a 71-year-old man from Douglas County, a 57-year-old man from Marion County, a 93-year-old woman from Klamath County, a 100-year-old man from Union County, a 75-year-old woman from Washington County and a 70-year-old man from Deschutes County. They all underlying conditions or conditions are still being determined. |
| June 9 | 269 | 203,933 | 16 | 2,716 | | Deaths: a 62-year-old man from Clackamas County, a 97-year-old woman from Clackamas County, a 68-year-old man from Clackamas County, a 96-year-old woman from Clackamas County, a 93-year-old man from Clackamas County, a 68-year-old man from Grant County, a 65-year-old man from Douglas County, a 76-year-old man from Hood River County, a 77-year-old woman from Linn County, a 62-year-old woman from Multnomah County, a 69-year-old woman from Multnomah County, a 51-year-old woman from Marion County, a 54-year-old man from Washington County, a 67-year-old woman from Washington County, a 60-year-old woman from Washington County and a 54-year-old man from Washington County. They all underlying conditions or conditions are still being determined. |
| June 10 | 370 | 204,291 | 10 | 2,726 | | Deaths: an 89-year-old man from Clackamas County, an 83-year-old woman from Clackamas County, a 90-year-old woman from Crook County, an 80-year-old man from Linn County, an 84-year-old man from Lane County, a 75-year-old woman from Multnomah County, a 73-year-old man from Yamhill County, a 55-year-old woman from Washington County, a 55-year-old woman from Washington County and a 73-year-old man from Wasco County. They all underlying conditions or conditions are still being determined. |
| June 11 | 308 | 204,587 | 0 | 2,726 | | Deaths: None. |
| June 12 | 285 | 204,865 | 3 | 2,729 | | Deaths: a 77-year-old woman from Klamath county, a 93-year-old woman from Lane county and a 96-year-old woman from Lane county. They all underlying conditions. |
| June 13 | 167 | 205,029 | 1 | 2,730 | | Deaths: a 58-year-old man from Multnomah County. The presence of underlying conditions is being confirmed. |
| June 14 | 127 | 205,154 | 0 | 2,730 | | Deaths: None. |
| June 15 | 314 | 205,459 | 7 | 2,737 | | Deaths: an 84-year-old man from Deschutes County, an 83-year-old man from Curry County, a 68-year-old man from Clackamas County, a 71-year-old man from Multnomah County, a 60-year-old man from Wasco County, an 81-year-old man from Lake County and a 74-year-old woman from Klamath County. They all underlying conditions or conditions are still being determined. |
| June 16 | 247 | 205,698 | 7 | 2,744 | | Deaths: a 33-year-old woman from Douglas County, a 77-year-old woman from Lane County, a 56-year-old man from Lane County, a 51-year-old man from Lane County, an 84-year-old man from Linn County, a 93-year-old woman from Multnomah County and a 91-year-old man from Umatilla County. They all underlying conditions or conditions are still being determined. |
| June 17 | 300 | 205,998 | 1 | 2,745 | | Deaths: a 76-year-old man from Lane County. He had underlying conditions. |
| June 18 | 315 | 206,299 | 5 | 2,750 | | Deaths: a 69-year-old man from Jefferson County, a 73-year-old man from Deschutes County, an 89-year-old woman from Clatsop County, a 74-year-old woman from Washington County and a 45-year-old man from Marion County. All except the 69-year-old man from Jefferson county had underlying conditions or conditions are still being determined. |
| June 19 | 289 | 206,578 | 3 | 2,753 | | Deaths: a 96-year-old woman from Lane County, a 73-year-old woman from Douglas County and an 80-year-old man from Polk County. All had underlying conditions. |
| June 20 | 200 | 206,774 | 1 | 2,754 | | Deaths: a 74-year-old woman from Lane County. She had underlying conditions. |
| June 21 | 78 | 206,850 | 2 | 2,756 | | Deaths: a 49-year-old woman from Linn county, she had no underlying conditions and a 54-year-old woman from Douglas county who had underlying conditions. |
| June 22 | 267 | 207,105 | 1 | 2,757 | | Deaths: a 55-year-old woman from Washington County. Presence of underlying conditions is being confirmed. |
| June 23 | 238 | 207,333 | 2 | 2,759 | | Deaths: a 27-year-old woman from Lane county and a 67-year-old man from Marion county. They both had underlying medical conditions. |
| June 24 | 232 | 207,558 | 1 | 2,760 | | Deaths: a 77-year-old man from Lane County. He had underlying conditions. |
| June 25 | 232 | 207,787 | 1 | 2,761 | | Deaths: an 81-year-old man from Jackson County. He had underlying conditions. |
| June 26 | 227 | 207,998 | 2 | 2,763 | | Deaths: an 86-year-old man from Marion County and a 72-year-old man from Harney County. They both had underlying conditions. |
| June 27 | 138 | 208,136 | 0 | 2,763 | | Deaths: None. |
| June 28 | 87 | 208,222 | 0 | 2,763 | | Deaths: None. |
| June 29 | 230 | 208,446 | 7 | 2,770 | | Deaths: a 92-year-old man from Curry County, a 67-year-old man from Coos County, a 42-year-old woman from Lane County, a 64-year-old man from Multnomah County, a 57-year-old man from Washington County, a 61-year-old man from Washington County and a 99-year-old woman from Washington County. They all underlying conditions or conditions are still being determined. |
| June 30 | 196 | 208,637 | 4 | 2,774 | | Deaths: an 80-year-old woman from Jefferson County, an 88-year-old man from Jackson County, a 70-year-old woman from Malheur County and an 84-year-old man from Lane County. They all underlying conditions or conditions are still being determined. |
| July 1 | 198 | 208,834 | 4 | 2,778 | | Deaths: a 64-year-old man from Columbia County, a 49-year-old woman from Coos County, a 72-year-old man from Harney County and an 87-year-old man from Jefferson County. They all underlying conditions. |
| July 2 | 209 | 209,035 | 3 | 2,781 | | Deaths: an 89-year-old man from Lincoln County, a 92-year-old man from Marion County and a 77-year-old man from Yamhill County. They all underlying conditions or conditions are still being determined. |
| July 3 | 189 | 209,224 | 0 | 2,781 | | Deaths: None. Daily updates are no longer being published on weekends, they will be reported on the following Monday, or Tuesday if Monday falls on a holiday. |
| July 4 | 123 | 209,237 | 0 | 2,781 | | Deaths: None. Daily updates are no longer being published on weekends, they will be reported on the following Monday, or Tuesday if Monday falls on a holiday. |
| July 5 | 66 | 209,413 | 0 | 2,781 | | Deaths: None. Daily updates are no longer being published on weekends, they will be reported on the following Monday, or Tuesday if Monday falls on a holiday. |
| July 6 | 89 | 209,494 | 1 | 2,782 | | Deaths: a 63-year-old man from Douglas County. Presence of underlying conditions is being confirmed. |
| July 7 | 273 | 209,764 | 6 | 2,788 | | Deaths: a 49-year-old woman from Jefferson County, a 41-year-old man from Hood River County, an 87-year-old man from Lane County, a 52-year-old man from Josephine County, a 64-year-old man from Marion County and an 83-year-old woman from Umatilla County. They all had underlying conditions. |
| July 8 | 212 | 209,973 | 2 | 2,790 | | Deaths: a 66-year-old man from Multnomah County and a 72-year-old man from Klamath County. They both underlying conditions or conditions are still being determined. |
| July 9 | 265 | 210,229 | 2 | 2,792 | | Deaths: a 93-year-old man from Crook County and a 75-year-old woman from Douglas County. They both underlying conditions or conditions are still being determined. |
| July 10–12 | 506 | 210,729 | 5 | 2,797 | | Cases: 254 July 10, 172 July 11, 80 July 12. Deaths: a 79-year-old man from Malheur County, a 92-year-old woman from Clackamas County, an 84-year-old man from Multnomah County, an 85-year-old woman from Washington County and an 85-year-old woman from Washington County. They all underlying conditions or conditions are still being determined. |
| July 13 | 340 | 211,065 | 3 | 2,800 | | Deaths: a 93-year-old man from Columbia County, a 71-year-old man from Columbia County and an 86-year-old man from Clatsop County. They all underlying conditions or conditions are still being determined. |
| July 14 | 251 | 211,315 | 3 | 2,803 | | Deaths: a 78-year-old man from Clackamas County, an 88-year-old woman from Clackamas County and a 91-year-old man from Clackamas County. They all underlying conditions. |
| July 15 | 322 | 211,631 | 7 | 2,810 | | Deaths: a 78-year-old man from Deschutes County, a 59-year-old man from Baker County, a 63-year-old man from Marion County, a 75-year-old man from Jackson County, a 56-year-old man from Washington County, an 83-year-old woman from Morrow County and a 68-year-old man from Umatilla County. They all underlying conditions or conditions are still being determined. |
| July 16 | 369 | 211,998 | 7 | 2,817 | | Deaths: an 82-year-old woman from Clackamas County, a 70-year-old man from Josephine County, an 80-year-old man from Malheur County, an 86-year-old woman from Sherman County, an 85-year-old woman from Wasco County, a 64-year-old man from Washington County and a 54-year-old man from Washington County. They all underlying conditions or conditions are still being determined. |
| July 17–19 | 777 | 212,755 | 9 | 2,826 | | Deaths: a 73-year-old man from Deschutes County, a 53-year-old man from Deschutes County, a 70-year-old man from Baker County, a 70-year-old man from Malheur County, a 68-year-old man from Douglas County, a 63-year-old woman from Umatilla County, an 82-year-old man from Umatilla County, a 63-year-old woman from Umatilla County and a 59-year-old woman from Wallowa County. They all underlying conditions or conditions are still being determined. |
| July 20 | 595 | 213,339 | 6 | 2,832 | | Deaths: a 64-year-old woman from Deschutes County, a 76-year-old man from Deschutes County, a 75-year-old man from Jackson County, a 66-year-old woman from Jackson County, a 53-year-old woman from Lane County and a 67-year-old man from Lane County. They all underlying conditions or conditions are still being determined. |
| July 21 | 421 | 213,730 | 1 | 2,833 | | Deaths: a 39-year-old woman from Marion county. Presence of underlying conditions are still being determined. |
| July 22 | 539 | 214,263 | 1 | 2,834 | | Deaths: a 95-year-old woman from Douglas County. Presence of underlying conditions are still being determined. |
| July 23 | 613 | 214,869 | 2 | 2,836 | | Deaths: a 66-year-old man from Yamhill County and a 46-year-old woman from Tillamook County. They both had underlying conditions. |
| July 24–26 | 993 | 215,853 | 2 | 2,838 | | Deaths: a 69-year-old man from Clackamas County and an 85-year-old man from Multnomah county. They both had underlying conditions or underlying conditions are still being determined. |
| July 27 | 1032 | 216,875 | 5 | 2,843 | | Deaths: an 87-year-old woman from Lane County, an 84-year-old man from Lane County, a 95-year-old woman from Marion County, a 58-year-old man from Polk County and a 90-year-old man from Josephine County. The all had underlying conditions or underlying conditions are still being determined. |
| July 28 | 804 | 217,690 | 6 | 2,849 | | Deaths: an 81-year-old woman from Lane County, a 95-year-old woman from Jackson County, a 99-year-old woman from Jackson County, a 37-year-old woman from Washington County, a 33-year-old man from Umatilla County and a 90-year-old woman from Umatilla county. The all had underlying conditions or underlying conditions are still being determined. |
| July 29 | 1026 | 218,689 | 6 | 2,855 | | Deaths: an 80-year-old man from Jackson County, an 83-year-old man from Jackson County, a 63-year-old woman from Douglas County, a 48-year-old man from Marion County, a 67-year-old woman from Marion County and an 85-year-old woman from Linn County. The all had underlying conditions or underlying conditions are still being determined. |
| July 30 | 1076 | 219,755 | 3 | 2,858 | | Deaths: a 61-year-old man from Marion County, an 83-year-old man from Jackson County and an 85-year-old woman from Clackamas County. The all had underlying conditions. |
| July 31- August 2 | 2056 | 221,799 | 5 | 2,863 | | Deaths: a 59-year-old man from Lane County, an 81-year-old woman from Jackson County, a 71-year-old man from Douglas County, a 53-year-old man from Clackamas County and a 93-year-old woman from Baker County. The all had underlying conditions or underlying conditions are still being determined. |
| August 3 | 1575 | 223,364 | 9 | 2,872 | | Deaths: a 71-year-old man from Douglas County, a 78-year-old man from Douglas County, a 78-year-old woman from Douglas County, a 70-year-old man from Douglas County, a 43-year-old man from Jackson County, a 96-year-old man from Jackson County, an 82-year-old woman from Josephine County, a 100-year-old woman from Washington County and a 69-year-old woman from Yamhill County. The all had underlying conditions or underlying conditions are still being determined. |
| August 4 | 1213 | 224,547 | 5 | 2,877 | | Deaths: a 74-year-old woman from Jackson county, a 43-year-old woman from Douglas County, an 86-year-old woman from Coos County, a 69-year-old man from Clatsop County and a 74-year-old man from Lane County. The all had underlying conditions or underlying conditions are still being determined. |
| August 5 | 1382 | 225,919 | 8 | 2,885 | | Deaths: a 78-year-old man from Union County, a 78-year-old woman from Union County, a 78-year-old man from Union County, a 61-year-old woman from Union County, an 85-year-old man from Lincoln County, a 35-year-old man from Jackson County, an 81-year-old man from Jackson County and a 76-year-old man from Malheur County. The all had underlying conditions. |
| August 6 | 970 | 226,899 | 4 | 2,889 | | Deaths: a 25-year-old man from Jackson County, a 48-year-old man from Jackson County, a 67-year-old woman from Multnomah County and a 67-year-old man from Lane County. All except the 48-year-old man from Jackson County had underlying conditions. |
| August 7–9 | 3229 | 230,103 | 14 | 2,903 | | Deaths: a 79-year-old woman from Jackson County, a 61-year-old man from Jackson County, a 69-year-old woman from Douglas County, a 59-year-old woman from Lane County, an 83-year-old man from Lane County, a 75-year-old woman from Josephine County, a 77-year-old man from Josephine County, a 52-year-old man from Josephine County, a 64-year-old man from Gilliam County, a 72-year-old woman from Yamhill County, a 64-year-old woman from Yamhill County, a 90-year-old woman from Wasco County, a 69-year-old man from Umatilla County and a 76-year-old woman from Polk County. All had underlying conditions or underlying conditions are still being determined. |
| August 10 | 2329 | 232,436 | 9 | 2,912 | | Deaths: an 88-year-old man from Douglas County, a 99-year-old woman from Deschutes County, a 90-year-old woman from Clackamas County, a 73-year-old man from Josephine County, a 76-year-old man from Marion County, a 74-year-old man from Marion County, a 67-year-old woman from Marion County, a 65-year-old man from Marion County and a 72-year-old man from Wasco County. All had underlying conditions or underlying conditions are still being determined. |
| August 11 | 1991 | 234,393 | 8 | 2,920 | | Deaths: a 65-year-old woman from Crook County, an 82-year-old man from Crook County, a 78-year-old woman from Clackamas County, a 59-year-old woman from Douglas County, an 82-year-old man from Douglas County, a 71-year-old woman from Douglas County, an 84-year-old man from Josephine County and a 39-year-old man from Umatilla County. All had underlying conditions or underlying conditions are still being determined. |
| August 12 | 2387 | 236,698 | 9 | 2,928 | | Deaths: a 47-year-old woman from Josephine County, a 66-year-old man from Columbia County, a 70-year-old man from Columbia County, a 35-year-old woman from Morrow County, a 101-year-old woman from Wasco County, an 83-year-old woman from Wasco County, a 19-year-old woman from Union County, a 75-year-old man from Polk County and a 90-year-old man from Polk County. All had underlying conditions or underlying conditions are still being determined. |
| August 13 | 1785 | 238,463 | 7 | 2,935 | | Deaths: a 56-year-old man from Multnomah County, a 90-year-old man from Marion County, a 61-year-old woman from Douglas County, a 53-year-old man from Jackson County, a 70-year-old man from Curry County, a 95-year-old woman from Crook County and a 78-year-old man from Coos County. All except the 56-year-old man from Multnomah County had underlying conditions or underlying conditions are still being determined. |
| August 14–16 | 4396 | 242,843 | 14 | 2,949 | | Deaths: a 54-year-old woman from Douglas County, a 27-year-old woman from Douglas County, a 79-year-old man from Douglas County, an 80-year-old woman from Crook County, a 69-year-old woman from Coos County, a 90-year-old woman from Jackson County, an 88-year-old man from Jackson County, a 69-year-old man from Lane County, a 47-year-old woman from Jefferson County, a 47-year-old man from Washington County, a 93-year-old man from Washington County, a 54-year-old man from Multnomah County, a 93-year-old man from Wasco County and a 63-year-old man from Jackson County. All had underlying conditions or underlying conditions are still being determined. |
| August 17 | 2941 | 245,758 | 15 | 2,964 | | Deaths: a 71-year-old man from Jackson County, a 77-year-old woman from Hood River County, a 69-year-old man from Douglas County, a 92-year-old woman from Coos County, a 62-year-old man from Coos County, an 85-year-old man from Jackson County, a 70-year-old woman from Jackson County, a 63-year-old woman from Jackson County, a 47-year-old woman from Jackson County, a 94-year-old woman from Marion County, a 67-year-old man from Josephine County, a 64-year-old woman from Washington County, a 73-year-old man from Washington County, an 82-year-old woman from Umatilla County and a 29-year-old woman from Umatilla County. All except the 69-year-old man from Douglas County had underlying conditions or underlying conditions are still being determined. |
| August 18 | 2139 | 247,866 | 11 | 2,975 | | Deaths: an 83-year-old woman from Jackson county, a 77-year-old man from Jackson county, an 83-year-old woman from Douglas county, a 58-year-old woman from Jefferson county, a 50-year-old woman from Yamhill county, a 70-year-old woman from Marion county, a 90-year-old man from Marion county, a 74-year-old woman from Marion county, an 81-year-old man from Josephine county, an 82-year-old woman from Umatilla county and an 82-year-old woman from Umatilla county. All had underlying conditions or underlying conditions are still being determined. |
| August 19 | 2971 | 250,835 | 19 | 2,994 | | Deaths: an 84-year-old man from Douglas County, a 50-year-old man from Douglas County, a 73-year-old woman from Douglas County, a 63-year-old man from Crook County, an 84-year-old woman from Coos County, a 49-year-old man from Coos County, a 95-year-old woman from Baker County, an 89-year-old woman from Josephine County, an 80-year-old woman from Josephine County, a 61-year-old man from Josephine County, a 91-year-old man from Josephine County, a 74-year-old woman from Jackson County, an 80-year-old man from Jackson County, an 85-year-old woman from Josephine County, a 68-year-old woman from Josephine County, an 80-year-old woman from Umatilla County, a 47-year-old man from Umatilla County, a 50-year-old man from Lane County and a 67-year-old man from Tillamook County. All had underlying conditions or underlying conditions are still being determined. |
| August 20 | 2187 | 252,977 | 19 | 3,012 | | Deaths: an 87-year-old man from Deschutes County, an 87-year-old man from Clackamas County, a 70-year-old man from Clackamas County, an 86-year-old man from Clackamas County, a 74-year-old man from Clackamas County, an 87-year-old woman from Douglas County, a 79-year-old man from Klamath County, a 62-year-old man from Klamath County, a 62-year-old woman from Josephine County, an 81-year-old man from Josephine County, a 64-year-old woman from Josephine County, a 95-year-old man from Josephine County, a 65-year-old man from Josephine County, a 100-year-old man from Josephine County, an 80-year-old man from Umatilla County, a 67-year-old man from Multnomah County, a 62-year-old man from Union County, a 96-year-old man from Polk County and a 95-year-old woman from Wasco County. All except the 65-year-old man from Josephine County had underlying conditions or underlying conditions are still being determined. |
| August 21–23 | 4701 | 257,644 | 24 | 3,036 | | Deaths: a 55-year-old man from Jackson County, an 88-year-old man from Douglas County, an 81-year-old woman from Deschutes County, a 90-year-old woman from Curry County, a 68-year-old woman from Clackamas County, an 84-year-old man from Jackson County, a 61-year-old man from Josephine County, a 75-year-old man from Lane County, a 57-year-old woman from Lane County, a 78-year-old man from Lane County, a 74-year-old woman from Lane County, a 61-year-old woman from Lane County, a 75-year-old woman from Multnomah County, a 48-year-old woman from Marion County, a 49-year-old woman from Lincoln County, a 54-year-old man from Umatilla County, a 66-year-old man from Umatilla County, a 49-year-old man from Tillamook County, a 65-year-old man from Douglas County, a 60-year-old man from Douglas County, a 69-year-old woman from Douglas County, a 94-year-old man from Douglas County, a 49-year-old man from Jackson County and a 90-year-old man from Jackson County. All had underlying conditions or underlying conditions are still being determined. |
| August 24 | 2804 | 260,425 | 30 | 3,066 | | Deaths: a 61-year-old man from Douglas County, a 72-year-old man from Douglas County, a 90-year-old man from Coos County, an 81-year-old woman from Coos County, a 74-year-old woman from Benton County, an 84-year-old man from Jackson County, a 70-year-old woman from Jackson County, a 73-year-old man from Jackson County, an 88-year-old woman from Jackson County, a 59-year-old woman from Jackson County, a 95-year-old man from Jackson County, a 67-year-old woman from Jackson County, an 81-year-old man from Josephine County, an 80-year-old man from Josephine County, an 83-year-old man from Josephine County, a 77-year-old woman from Josephine County, a 77-year-old man from Josephine County, a 50-year-old man from Lane County, a 75-year-old woman from Multnomah County, an 83-year-old man from Marion County, a 61-year-old woman from Marion County, an 87-year-old man from Marion County, a 53-year-old man from Marion County, a 67-year-old man from Tillamook County, a 92-year-old man from Tillamook County, an 80-year-old man from Tillamook County, a 31-year-old woman from Tillamook County, a 74-year-old woman from Yamhill County, a 74-year-old man from Washington County and a 71-year-old man from Deschutes County. All had underlying conditions or underlying conditions are still being determined. |
| August 25 | 2777 | 263,164 | 20 | 3,086 | | Deaths: a 48-year-old woman from Douglas County, a 74-year-old woman from Douglas County, a 91-year-old woman from Douglas County, a 72-year-old woman from Crook County, a 74-year-old woman from Coos County, a 59-year-old woman from Douglas County, a 72-year-old woman from Douglas County, an 89-year-old woman from Marion County, a 97-year-old man from Josephine County, a 69-year-old woman from Jackson County, a 65-year-old man from Josephine County, a 74-year-old man from Multnomah County, a 73-year-old man from Multnomah County, a 59-year-old man from Washington County, a 69-year-old woman from Umatilla County, a 66-year-old man from Umatilla County, a 52-year-old woman from Umatilla County, a 63-year-old man from Umatilla County, an 82-year-old woman from Lincoln County and a 55-year-old man from Columbia County. All had underlying conditions or underlying conditions are still being determined. |
| August 26 | 2057 | 265,210 | 9 | 3,095 | | Deaths: a 72-year-old man from Josephine County, an 88-year-old man from Jackson County, a 95-year-old woman from Douglas County, an 81-year-old woman from Josephine County, an 81-year-old woman from Josephine County, a 52-year-old man from Tillamook County, a 53-year-old man from Washington County, a 78-year-old man from Umatilla County and a 71-year-old woman from Lane County. All except the 72-year-old man from Josephine County had underlying conditions or underlying conditions are still being determined. |
| August 27 | 3207 | 268,401 | 20 | 3,115 | | Deaths: a 42-year-old woman from Jackson County, an 89-year-old woman from Jackson County, a 74-year-old woman from Washington County, a 74-year-old woman from Marion County, a 71-year-old woman from Multnomah County, a 29-year-old woman from Multnomah County, an 81-year-old man from Umatilla County, a 78-year-old man from Tillamook County, a 70-year-old woman from Coos County, an 80-year-old woman from Jackson County, a 61-year-old woman from Josephine County, a 62-year-old man from Jackson County, a 71-year-old man from Polk County, a 58-year-old man from Marion County, a 75-year-old woman from Marion County, a 57-year-old woman from Marion County, a 45-year-old man from Jackson County, a 71-year-old man from Jackson County, a 74-year-old man from Marion County and a 62-year-old man from Umatilla County. All had underlying conditions or underlying conditions are still being determined. |
| August 28–30 | 5545 | 273,896 | 40 | 3,155 | | Deaths: a 68-year-old woman from Curry County, a 34-year-old man from Curry County, a 43-year-old man from Douglas County, a 57-year-old woman from Douglas County, a 97-year-old woman from Douglas County, an 81-year-old man from Douglas County, a 66-year-old woman from Douglas County, a 50-year-old man from Douglas County, a 66-year-old man from Douglas County, a 65-year-old man from Douglas County, a 56-year-old woman from Douglas County, an 85-year-old man from Douglas County, an 86-year-old man from Josephine County, an 85-year-old man from Josephine County, a 67-year-old woman from Josephine County, a 74-year-old woman from Jackson County, a 92-year-old man from Jackson County, a 65-year-old man from Jackson County, an 89-year-old man from Lane County, an 80-year-old man from Lane County, a 70-year-old man from Lane County, a 75-year-old woman from Lane County, a 78-year-old man from Yamhill County, a 73-year-old man from Marion County, a 21-year-old man from Umatilla County, a 51-year-old woman from Umatilla County, an 80-year-old woman from Linn County, a 75-year-old woman from Morrow County, a 75-year-old man from Morrow County, a 94-year-old woman from Klamath County, an 86-year-old man from Jefferson County, a 91-year-old man from Gilliam County, an 87-year-old man from Deschutes County, a 64-year-old woman from Grant County, an 85-year-old woman from Union County, an 82-year-old man from Lane County, a 35-year-old woman from Marion County, a 59-year-old man from Marion County, a 74-year-old woman from Douglas County and a 52-year-old woman from Douglas County. All except the 75-year-old woman from Morrow County and the 64-year-old woman from Grant County had underlying conditions or underlying conditions are still being determined. |
| August 31 | 2414 | 276,286 | 43 | 3,198 | | Deaths: a 98-year-old woman from Tillamook County, a 70-year-old man from Coos County, an 87-year-old woman from Clackamas County, a 77-year-old man from Clackamas County, an 80-year-old woman from Clackamas County, an 80-year-old man from Coos County, a 64-year-old man from Coos County, a 70-year-old man from Coos County, an 82-year-old woman from Coos County, a 76-year-old man from Crook County, a 64-year-old woman from Crook County, a 54-year-old man from Douglas County, an 83-year-old man from Douglas County, a 62-year-old woman from Jackson County, a 78-year-old woman from Jackson County, a 79-year-old man from Jackson County, a 69-year-old man from Jackson County, an 86-year-old woman from Josephine County, an 82-year-old woman from Jackson County, a 49-year-old man from Josephine County, a 35-year-old woman from Josephine County, a 74-year-old man from Josephine County, a 74-year-old man from Josephine County, a 76-year-old woman from Josephine County, a 74-year-old woman from Josephine County, an 80-year-old man from Josephine County, a 64-year-old woman from Josephine County, a 68-year-old man from Lane County, an 83-year-old man from Josephine County, a 91-year-old woman from Lane County, an 82-year-old man from Marion County, an 87-year-old woman from Marion County, a 67-year-old man from Marion County, a 68-year-old man from Marion County, a 94-year-old woman from Multnomah County, a 65-year-old man from Multnomah County, a 93-year-old man from Polk County, a 74-year-old man from Tillamook County, a 72-year-old woman from Tillamook County, a 77-year-old man from Union County, a 62-year-old man from Yamhill County, a 75-year-old woman from Yamhill County and a 64-year-old man from Yamhill County. All had underlying conditions or underlying conditions are still being determined. |
| September 1 | 2827 | 279,086 | 23 | 3,221 | | Deaths: a 68-year-old man from Douglas County, a 64-year-old man from Douglas County, a 91-year-old woman from Clackamas County, a 72-year-old man from Clackamas County, a 55-year-old man from Douglas County, a 53-year-old woman from Douglas County, a 90-year-old man from Jackson County, an 88-year-old woman from Jackson County, a 74-year-old man from Jackson County, a 79-year-old man from Harney county, a 68-year-old man from Jackson County, a 67-year-old woman from Josephine County, an 80-year-old woman from Klamath County, a 73-year-old man from Klamath County, a 59-year-old man from Lane County, a 67-year-old woman from Lane County, a 96-year-old woman from Lane County, an 82-year-old man from Lane County, an 88-year-old man from Lane County, an 87-year-old woman from Lane County, an 84-year-old man from Lane County, a 54-year-old man from Multnomah County and a 78-year-old woman from Union County. All except the 64-year-old man from Douglas County had underlying conditions or underlying conditions are still being determined. |
| September 2 | 2449 | 281,513 | 27 | 3,248 | | Deaths: a 95-year-old woman from Clatsop County, a 97-year-old woman from Clatsop County, a 95-year-old man from Clatsop County, a 44-year-old man from Clatsop County, a 91-year-old woman from Clatsop County, a 41-year-old man from Columbia County, an 80-year-old man from Gilliam County, a 67-year-old woman from Douglas County, a 45-year-old woman from Douglas County, an 83-year-old woman from Jackson County, a 101-year-old woman from Jackson County, a 69-year-old man from Jackson County, a 62-year-old woman from Jackson County, a 75-year-old man from Lane County, an 82-year-old man from Josephine County, a 64-year-old man from Josephine County, a 75-year-old man from Josephine County, a 59-year-old man from Josephine County, a 76-year-old man from Josephine County, a 62-year-old man from Lane County, a 64-year-old man from Lane County, a 75-year-old woman from Lincoln County, a 69-year-old man from Marion County, a 76-year-old woman from Multnomah County, a 26-year-old man from Multnomah County, a 76-year-old man from Multnomah County and a 71-year-old man from Union County. All had underlying conditions or underlying conditions are still being determined. |
| September 3 | 2379 | 283,873 | 24 | 3,272 | | Deaths: a 65-year-old man from Douglas County, a 59-year-old woman from Coos County, a 75-year-old man from Clatsop County, an 88-year-old man from Clatsop County, a 67-year-old woman from Clatsop County, a 72-year-old woman from Clatsop County, a 52-year-old man from Clatsop County, a 64-year-old woman from Douglas County, a 74-year-old man from Douglas County, an 85-year-old woman from Jackson County, a 57-year-old man from Josephine County, a 33-year-old man from Josephine County, a 69-year-old man from Josephine County, a 70-year-old man from Josephine County, an 81-year-old man from Lane County, a 69-year-old man from Lane County, a 72-year-old man from Lane County, a 57-year-old woman from Lincoln County, a 64-year-old man from Polk County, a 64-year-old woman from Tillamook County, a 60-year-old man from Washington County, an 80-year-old woman from Klamath County, a 67-year-old woman from Klamath County and a 57-year-old man from Malheur County. All had underlying conditions or underlying conditions are still being determined. |
| September 4–7 | 5821 | 289,649 | 54 | 3,326 | | Deaths: an 85-year-old man from Deschutes County, a 94-year-old woman from Coos County, a 74-year-old man from Columbia County, a 52-year-old woman from Columbia County, a 65-year-old man from Clackamas County, an 84-year-old woman from Clackamas County, a 95-year-old woman from Clackamas County, a 69-year-old woman from Deschutes County, an 83-year-old woman from Douglas County, a 62-year-old woman from Douglas County, a 73-year-old woman from Douglas County, a 53-year-old man from Douglas County, a 68-year-old man from Douglas County, a 74-year-old woman from Douglas County, a 78-year-old man from Douglas County, a 54-year-old man from Douglas County, a 26-year-old man from Douglas County, a 73-year-old woman from Harney County, a 78-year-old man from Jackson County, a 77-year-old man from Jackson County, a 65-year-old man from Jackson County, a 72-year-old woman from Jackson County, a 61-year-old woman from Jackson County, a 56-year-old man from Josephine County, a 78-year-old man from Josephine County, a 67-year-old man from Josephine County, a 53-year-old woman from Josephine County, a 93-year-old man from Josephine County, a 78-year-old man from Josephine County, a 57-year-old man from Josephine County, a 56-year-old woman from Josephine County, a 25-year-old woman from Josephine County, an 87-year-old woman from Josephine County, a 74-year-old man from Josephine County, a 61-year-old woman from Josephine County, a 77-year-old man from Josephine County, a 31-year-old woman from Umatilla County, an 86-year-old woman from Lane County, a 55-year-old woman from Lane County, a 69-year-old man from Lane County, a 54-year-old man from Lane County, a 42-year-old man from Lane County, a 56-year-old woman from Lane County, a 78-year-old man from Lane County, a 61-year-old woman from Lane County, a 62-year-old man from Lane County, a 55-year-old woman from Lane County, a 72-year-old woman from Lane County, an 86-year-old woman from Lane County, a 79-year-old man from Marion County, a 78-year-old woman from Marion County, a 72-year-old woman from Marion County, a 44-year-old woman from Yamhill County and a 70-year-old man from Josephine County. All except the 78-year-old man from Douglas County, the 54-year-old man from Douglas County and the 26-year-old man from Douglas County had underlying conditions or underlying conditions are still being determined. |
| September 8 | 2352 | 291,978 | 47 | 3,373 | | Deaths: a 62-year-old woman from Coos County, a 78-year-old man from Coos County, a 78-year-old man from Coos County, a 55-year-old man from Clackamas County, an 83-year-old man from Coos County, a 90-year-old woman from Coos County, an 89-year-old man from Deschutes County, an 87-year-old woman from Coos County, an 86-year-old man from Jackson County, a 69-year-old man from Jackson County, an 81-year-old man from Douglas County, a 96-year-old woman from Douglas County, a 75-year-old man from Douglas County, a 79-year-old man from Douglas County, a 70-year-old woman from Douglas County, an infant boy from Douglas County, a 53-year-old man from Douglas County, a 72-year-old woman from Jackson County, a 73-year-old woman from Jackson County, a 66-year-old woman from Jackson County, a 73-year-old man from Jackson County, an 83-year-old man from Klamath County, a 70-year-old man from Josephine County, a 74-year-old man from Josephine County, a 96-year-old man from Josephine County, an 87-year-old woman from Josephine County, a 64-year-old woman from Klamath County, a 65-year-old woman from Lane County, a 71-year-old man from Lane County, an 85-year-old woman from Lane County, a 59-year-old man from Linn County, a 68-year-old woman from Marion County, an 82-year-old man from Marion County, a 78-year-old woman from Marion County, a 61-year-old man from Marion County, a 69-year-old man from Marion County, a 34-year-old man from Marion County, a 24-year-old man from Marion County, a 74-year-old woman from Marion County, an 86-year-old man from Tillamook County, a 64-year-old man from Polk County, an 87-year-old woman from Polk County, a 76-year-old man from Polk County, a 20-year-old woman from Polk County, a 49-year-old woman from Polk County, a 62-year-old man from Washington County and a 79-year-old man from Washington County. All except the 78-year-old man from Coos County had underlying conditions or underlying conditions are still being determined. |
| September 9 | 2437 | 294,392 | 21 | 3,394 | | Deaths: a 74-year-old man from Douglas County, an 83-year-old woman from Clatsop County, an 87-year-old man from Clatsop County, a 49-year-old man from Clatsop County, a 71-year-old woman from Clackamas County, a 76-year-old woman from Clackamas County, a 90-year-old woman from Jackson County, a 75-year-old woman from Jackson County, a 63-year-old woman from Jackson County, a 60-year-old man from Jackson County, a 46-year-old man from Josephine County, an 89-year-old man from Josephine County, a 72-year-old man from Lane County, a 73-year-old woman from Tillamook County, a 98-year-old man from Multnomah County, an 83-year-old man from Marion County, a 45-year-old woman from Marion County, a 92-year-old woman from Linn County, an 86-year-old man from Umatilla County, a 73-year-old man from Umatilla County and a 43-year-old man from Washington County. All had underlying conditions or underlying conditions are still being determined. |
| September 10 | 2453 | 296,825 | 20 | 3,414 | | Deaths: a 63-year-old man from Crook County, a 94-year-old woman from Crook County, a 92-year-old woman from Clackamas County, a 78-year-old man from Jackson County, a 53-year-old woman from Jackson County, a 76-year-old man from Lane County, an 80-year-old man from Josephine County, an 81-year-old man from Josephine County, a 76-year-old man from Josephine County, a 63-year-old man from Josephine County, a 47-year-old man from Josephine County, an 84-year-old man from Marion County, a 66-year-old woman from Multnomah County, an 80-year-old woman from Multnomah County, an 87-year-old woman from Multnomah County, a 64-year-old man from Yamhill County, a 52-year-old woman from Yamhill County, a 71-year-old man from Yamhill County, a 74-year-old woman from Lincoln County and a 79-year-old woman from Lincoln County. All except the 63-year-old man from Crook County had underlying conditions or underlying conditions are still being determined. |
| September 11–13 | 4700 | 301,504 | 32 | 3,446 | | Deaths: an 87-year-old woman from Douglas County, a 68-year-old woman from Douglas County, an 88-year-old woman from Deschutes County, an 89-year-old man from Deschutes County, a 55-year-old woman from Clackamas County, a 90-year-old woman from Clackamas County, a 70-year-old woman from Clackamas County, a 54-year-old woman from Douglas County, a 57-year-old man from Douglas County, a 77-year-old man from Douglas County, a 24-year-old woman from Douglas County, a 75-year-old man from Douglas County, a 58-year-old man from Douglas County, a 32-year-old man from Douglas County, a 78-year-old man from Douglas County, a 41-year-old woman from Douglas County, an 85-year-old woman from Jackson County, a 67-year-old woman from Jackson County, a 57-year-old woman from Josephine County, a 67-year-old woman from Josephine County, a 77-year-old man from Josephine County, a 60-year-old man from Jackson County, a 74-year-old man from Jackson County, a 94-year-old man from Washington County, a 68-year-old woman from Union County, a 63-year-old man from Union County, a 66-year-old man from Tillamook County, a 57-year-old woman from Lane County, a 73-year-old man from Lane County, a 76-year-old woman from Lane County, a 36-year-old woman from Lane County and a 49-year-old man from Lane County. All had underlying conditions or underlying conditions are still being determined. |
| September 14 | 2040 | 303,532 | 44 | 3,490 | | Deaths: a 91-year-old man from Jackson County, an 81-year-old man from Douglas County, a 75-year-old man from Douglas County, a 50-year-old woman from Douglas County, a 79-year-old man from Deschutes County, a 96-year-old man from Coos County, a 62-year-old woman from Coos County, a 95-year-old woman from Coos County, a 61-year-old woman from Jackson County, a 68-year-old woman from Jackson County, an 81-year-old man from Jefferson County, a 69-year-old woman from Josephine County, an 86-year-old man from Josephine County, a 54-year-old woman from Josephine County, an 83-year-old woman from Josephine County, a 44-year-old man from Klamath County, a 56-year-old woman from Klamath County, a 74-year-old man from Klamath County, a 75-year-old woman from Lane County, an 84-year-old man from Lane County, an 84-year-old man from Lane County, an 83-year-old man from Lane County, a 60-year-old man from Lane County, a 73-year-old woman from Lane County, a 98-year-old woman from Lane County, a 66-year-old woman from Marion County, a 56-year-old man from Marion County, an 82-year-old woman from Marion County, a 78-year-old man from Marion County, a 24-year-old man from Marion County, a 96-year-old woman from Marion County, a 33-year-old woman from Marion County, a 72-year-old woman from Marion County, a 70-year-old man from Marion County, an 82-year-old woman from Marion County, a 72-year-old woman from Polk County, an 81-year-old woman from Crook County, a 78-year-old man from Crook County, a 51-year-old man from Crook County, an 85-year-old woman from Crook County, an 86-year-old man from Washington County, a 45-year-old man from Tillamook County, a 71-year-old man from Sherman County and an 80-year-old man from Morrow County. All except the 71-year-old man from Sherman County had underlying conditions or underlying conditions are still being determined. |
| September 15 | 2069 | 305,560 | 46 | 3,536 | | Deaths: a 45-year-old man from Coos County, a 71-year-old woman from Coos County, an 82-year-old woman from Coos County, a 60-year-old man from Clatsop County, an 84-year-old man from Clackamas County, a 71-year-old man from Clackamas County, a 65-year-old man from Benton County, a 65-year-old woman from Douglas County, a 39-year-old woman from Douglas County, a 43-year-old man from Douglas County, a 70-year-old man from Douglas County, an 86-year-old woman from Douglas County, a 73-year-old man from Curry County, an 80-year-old man from Douglas County, an 89-year-old man from Douglas County, a 79-year-old woman from Jackson County, a 98-year-old man from Jackson County, a 56-year-old man from Jackson County, an 85-year-old man from Josephine County, a 79-year-old man from Josephine County, an 86-year-old woman from Lane County, a 54-year-old man from Lane County, a 53-year-old man from Lane County, a 41-year-old woman from Lane County, an 82-year-old man from Klamath County, a 76-year-old woman from Lane County, an 82-year-old woman from Lane County, a 65-year-old man from Benton County, a 47-year-old man from Marion County, a 95-year-old woman from Marion County, an 84-year-old woman from Marion County, a 64-year-old woman from Yamhill County, a 76-year-old man from Yamhill County, an 82-year-old woman from Wasco County, a 56-year-old woman from Wallowa County, a 69-year-old man from Wallowa County, an 84-year-old man from Wallowa County, a 79-year-old woman from Wallowa County, a 74-year-old man from Tillamook County, a 54-year-old woman from Tillamook County, an 83-year-old woman from Multnomah County, a 75-year-old woman from Multnomah County, an 81-year-old man from Multnomah County, an 83-year-old man from Umatilla County, a 72-year-old man from Umatilla County and a 56-year-old woman from Umatilla County. All except the 45-year-old man from Coos County had underlying conditions or underlying conditions are still being determined. |
| September 16 | 2242 | 307,768 | 11 | 3,547 | | Deaths: a 64-year-old woman from Jackson County, a 62-year-old woman from Jackson County, a 75-year-old man from Jackson County, a 75-year-old man from Douglas County, a 59-year-old man from Jackson County, a 78-year-old man from Jackson County, a 93-year-old man from Jackson County, a 38-year-old man from Jackson County, a 70-year-old man from Multnomah County, an 86-year-old woman from Wallowa County and a 69-year-old woman from Josephine County. All had underlying conditions or underlying conditions are still being determined. |
| September 17 | 2099 | 309,841 | 22 | 3,569 | | Deaths: a 68-year-old woman from Benton County, a 70-year-old man from Benton County, a 72-year-old woman from Baker County, a 73-year-old man from Clackamas County, a 53-year-old man from Clackamas County, a 69-year-old man from Jackson County, a 55-year-old man from Jackson County, a 72-year-old man from Harney County, a 77-year-old woman from Harney County, a 78-year-old man from Douglas County, a 70-year-old man from Deschutes County, a 78-year-old woman from Jackson County, a 95-year-old woman from Jackson County, a 43-year-old man from Lane County, a 57-year-old woman from Lane County, a 53-year-old woman from Polk County, a 65-year-old woman from Yamhill County, a 70-year-old woman from Yamhill County, a 73-year-old man from Yamhill County, a 72-year-old woman from Umatilla County, a 63-year-old man from Umatilla County and a 93-year-old woman from Multnomah County. All except the 72-year-old man from Harney County had underlying conditions or underlying conditions are still being determined. |
| September 18–20 | 3359 | 313,161 | 25 | 3,594 | | Deaths: a 91-year-old man from Deschutes County, an 88-year-old man from Crook County, a 91-year-old woman from Clackamas County, a 62-year-old man from Baker County, a 77-year-old man from Deschutes County, a 50-year-old man from Douglas County, a 46-year-old woman from Douglas County, an 83-year-old man from Douglas County, a 70-year-old woman from Lincoln County, a 64-year-old man from Josephine County, a 79-year-old man from Josephine County, an 81-year-old man from Jackson County, a 57-year-old woman from Jackson County, a 73-year-old man from Harney County, a 58-year-old woman from Linn County, a 70-year-old man from Marion County, a 45-year-old woman from Marion County, an 80-year-old man from Marion County, a 68-year-old man from Marion County, a 67-year-old woman from Marion County, a 64-year-old man from Union County, a 94-year-old man from Washington County, a 68-year-old man from Washington County, a 70-year-old woman from Washington County and a 64-year-old woman from Washington County. All had underlying conditions or underlying conditions are still being determined. |
| September 21 | 1707 | 314,841 | 30 | 3,624 | | Deaths: a 93-year-old man from Clackamas County, an 85-year-old woman from Clackamas County, a 63-year-old woman from Clackamas County, an 87-year-old man from Benton County, a 70-year-old man from Baker County, an 83-year-old man from Baker County, a 91-year-old woman from Clackamas County, a 47-year-old man from Columbia County, an 80-year-old man from Columbia County, an 87-year-old woman from Crook County, a 94-year-old woman from Deschutes County, a 78-year-old man from Harney County, a 75-year-old woman from Harney County, a 75-year-old man from Josephine County, a 68-year-old woman from Josephine County, a 75-year-old man from Jefferson County, a 77-year-old man from Josephine County, a 74-year-old man from Josephine County, an 80-year-old man from Klamath County, an 88-year-old woman from Washington County, an 81-year-old woman from Union County, an 81-year-old man from Polk County, a 79-year-old woman from Multnomah County, a 95-year-old woman from Marion County, a 55-year-old woman from Marion County, a 71-year-old man from Marion County, a 79-year-old man from Linn County, a 92-year-old woman from Lane County and an 86-year-old man from Lane County. All had underlying conditions or underlying conditions are still being determined. |
| September 22 | 2312 | 317,107 | 26 | 3,649 | | Deaths: a 47-year-old woman from Coos County, a 60-year-old man from Coos County, a 65-year-old man from Coos County, a 20-year-old woman from Baker County, an 84-year-old man from Douglas County, a 56-year-old man from Douglas County, a 70-year-old man from Douglas County, a 76-year-old woman from Deschutes County, a 54-year-old man from Douglas County, a 66-year-old woman from Douglas County, a 64-year-old man from Douglas County, a 50-year-old man from Douglas County, a 96-year-old woman from Josephine County, a 79-year-old man from Josephine County, a 56-year-old man from Jackson County, a 47-year-old woman from Jackson County, an 89-year-old man from Jackson County, an 80-year-old woman from Jackson County, a 64-year-old woman from Jackson County, a 54-year-old woman from Umatilla County, an 88-year-old man from Polk County, a 35-year-old woman from Marion County, a 43-year-old woman from Marion County, a 50-year-old man from Lane County, a 66-year-old man from Lane County and a 68-year-old man from Lane County. All except the 60-year-old man from Coos County had underlying conditions or underlying conditions are still being determined. |
| September 23 | 1836 | 319,914 | 12 | 3,661 | | Deaths: a 58-year-old woman from Lane County, a 59-year-old woman from Lane County, a 59-year-old woman from Lane County, a 41-year-old man from Washington County, a 70-year-old woman from Umatilla County, a 93-year-old man from Marion County, a 79-year-old man from Lane County, an 81-year-old man from Klamath County, an 83-year-old man from Jackson County, a 63-year-old man from Jackson County, a 72-year-old man from Jackson County and an 84-year-old woman from Clatsop County. All had underlying conditions or underlying conditions are still being determined. |
| September 24 | 2113 | 320,990 | 21 | 3,682 | | Deaths: a 67-year-old man from Douglas County, a 45-year-old woman from Douglas County, a 94-year-old woman from Douglas County, an 86-year-old woman from Douglas County, an 89-year-old man from Douglas County, a 45-year-old man from Douglas County, a 67-year-old woman from Douglas County, a 62-year-old woman from Wallowa County, a 71-year-old woman from Umatilla County, an 86-year-old man from Umatilla County, a 63-year-old woman from Multnomah County, a 63-year-old woman from Lane County, a 60-year-old man from Lane County, a 73-year-old woman from Josephine County, a 67-year-old woman from Josephine County, a 58-year-old man from Jackson County, a 58-year-old man from Jackson County, an 85-year-old man from Yamhill County, a 46-year-old woman from Yamhill County, a 30-year-old man from Washington County and a 50-year-old woman from Washington County. All had underlying conditions or underlying conditions are still being determined. |
| September 25–27 | 3606 | 324,571 | 27 | 3,709 | | |
| September 28 | 1658 | 326,191 | 41 | 3,750 | | |
| September 29 | 2011 | 328,184 | 21 | 3,771 | | |
| September 30 | 1896 | 330,054 | 20 | 3,791 | | |
| October 1 | 1686 | 331,709 | 24 | 3,815 | | |
| October 2–4 | 3286 | 334,971 | 8 | 3,823 | | |
| October 5 | 1650 | 336,598 | 44 | 3,867 | | |
| October 6 | 1564 | 338,130 | 33 | 3,900 | | |
| October 7 | 1453 | 339,556 | 59 | 3,959 | | Today's death toll is the highest we have seen yet during the COVID-19 Pandemic in Oregon. |
| October 8 | 1580 | 341,113 | 23 | 3,982 | | |
| October 9–11 | 2895 | 343,993 | 20 | 4,002 | | |
| October 12 | 1413 | 345,344 | 82 | 4,084 | | Today's death toll is again the highest we have seen yet during the COVID-19 Pandemic in Oregon. |
| October 13 | 1278 | 346,480 | 33 | 4,117 | | |
| October 14 | 1237 | 347,616 | 24 | 4,141 | | |
| October 15 | 1218 | 348,776 | 20 | 4,161 | | |
| October 16–18 | 3276 | 352,026 | 24 | 4,185 | | |
| October 19 | 1366 | 353,368 | 41 | 4,226 | | |
| October 20 | 1343 | 354,681 | 9 | 4,235 | | |
| October 21 | 1407 | 356,061 | 40 | 4,275 | | |
| October 22 | 1517 | 357,526 | 10 | 4,284 | | |
| October 23–25 | 2293 | 359,733 | 12 | 4,295 | | |
| October 26 | 1557 | 361,240 | 23 | 4,318 | | |
| October 27 | 1360 | 362,561 | 16 | 4,334 | | |
| October 28 | 1116 | 363,648 | 24 | 4,358 | | |
| October 29 | 1420 | 365,053 | 14 | 4,372 | | |
| October 30–31, November 1 | 2569 | 367,610 | 5 | 4,377 | | |
| November 2 | 1123 | 368,694 | 29 | 4,405 | | |
| November 3 | 1128 | 369,815 | 64 | 4,469 | | |
| November 4 | 1211 | 371,001 | 74 | 4,543 | | |
| November 5 | 1141 | 372,137 | 19 | 4,562 | | |
| November 6–8 | 2125 | 374,253 | 58 | 4,620 | | |
| November 9 | 1120 | 375,357 | 35 | 4,655 | | |
| November 10 | 1033 | 376,372 | 75 | 4,730 | | |
| November 11–12 | 1811 | 378,174 | 20 | 4,750 | | |
| November 13–15 | 1935 | 380,091 | 53 | 4,803 | | |
| November 16 | 785 | 380,866 | 52 | 4,855 | | |
| November 17 | 996 | 381,842 | 19 | 4,873 | | |
| November 18 | 1160 | 382,990 | 13 | 4,886 | | |
| November 19 | 1090 | 384,062 | 28 | 4,914 | | |
| November 20–22 | 1753 | 385,790 | 103 | 5,017 | | |
| November 23 | 869 | 386,634 | 51 | 5,066 | | |
| November 24 | 862 | 387,485 | 50 | 5,116 | | |
| November 25–29 | 2598 | 390,066 | 27 | 5,142 | | |
| November 30 | 1054 | 391,099 | 19 | 5,161 | | |
| December 1 | 1111 | 392,197 | 25 | 5,186 | | |
| December 2 | 1046 | 393,232 | 42 | 5,228 | | |
| December 3 | 1352 | 394,569 | 16 | 5,243 | | |
| December 4–6 | 2041 | 396,501 | 25 | 5,268 | | |
| December 7 | 945 | 397,421 | 31 | 5,299 | | |
| December 8 | 861 | 398,262 | 19 | 5,318 | | |
| December 9 | 901 | 399,361 | 38 | 5,356 | | |
| December 10 | 834 | 400,188 | 25 | 5,381 | | |
| December 11–13 | 1387 | 401,564 | 39 | 5,420 | | |
| December 14 | 883 | 402,436 | 49 | 5,469 | | |
| December 15 | 907 | 403,329 | 39 | 5,508 | | |
| December 16 | 909 | 404,229 | 19 | 5,527 | | |
| December 17 | 1072 | 405,292 | 5 | 5,531 | | |
| December 18–20 | 1941 | 407,153 | 3 | 5,534 | | |
| December 21 | 999 | 408,069 | 25 | 5,559 | | |
| December 22 | 1197 | 409,232 | 31 | 5,590 | | |
| December 23 | 1350 | 410,565 | 8 | 5,598 | | |
| December 24–27 | 3585 | 414,140 | 25 | 5,623 | | |
| December 28 | 1900 | 416,020 | 8 | 5,631 | | |
| December 29 | 2331 | 418,333 | 9 | 5,640 | | |
| December 30 | 2948 | 421,263 | 15 | 5,655 | | |
| December 31-January 3 | 9701 | 430,931 | 11 | 5,666 | | |
| January 4 | 4540 | 435,453 | 44 | 5,710 | | |
| January 5 | 6203 | 441,648 | 9 | 5,719 | | |
| January 6 | 7615 | 449,267 | 9 | 5,728 | | |
| January 7 | 10451 | 459,700 | 33 | 5,761 | | |
| January 8–10 | 18538 | 478,203 | 18 | 5,779 | | |
| January 11 | 8040 | 486,202 | 35 | 5,814 | | |
| January 12 | 8760 | 494,945 | 31 | 5,845 | | |
| January 13 | 9796 | 504,731 | 25 | 5,870 | | |
| January 14 | 8672 | 513,391 | 13 | 5,883 | | |
| January 15–18 | 28037 | 541,415 | 10 | 5,893 | | |
| January 19 | 8538 | 549,942 | 15 | 5,908 | | |
| January 20 | 10034 | 559,960 | 8 | 5,916 | | |
| January 21 | 10947 | 570,892 | 20 | 5,936 | | |
| January 22–24 | 19400 | 590,270 | 17 | 5,953 | | |
| January 25 | 6904 | 597,172 | 41 | 5,994 | | |
| January 26 | 8207 | 605,363 | 54 | 6,048 | | |
| January 27 | 7871 | 613,221 | 19 | 6,067 | | |
| January 28 | 7222 | 620,652 | 19 | 6,086 | | |
| January 29–31 | 13443 | 633,876 | 15 | 6,100 | | |
| February 1 | 5179 | 638,823 | 24 | 6,124 | | |
| February 2 | 5143 | 643,973 | 39 | 6,163 | | |
| February 3 | 5417 | 649,389 | 18 | 6,181 | | |
| February 4 | 4872 | 654,343 | 33 | 6,214 | | |
| February 5–7 | 7928 | 662,250 | 30 | 6,244 | | |
| February 8 | 3248 | 665,486 | 21 | 6,265 | | |
| February 9 | 3309 | 668,783 | 57 | 6,322 | | |
| February 10 | 3176 | 671,923 | 22 | 6,344 | | |
| February 11 | 2653 | 674,500 | 12 | 6,355 | | |
| February 12–14 | 4756 | 679,241 | 18 | 6,373 | | |
| February 15 | 1613 | 680,852 | 20 | 6,393 | | |
| February 16 | 1728 | 682,556 | 23 | 6,416 | | |
| February 17 | 1844 | 684,441 | 28 | 6,444 | | |
| February 18 | 1635 | 685,953 | 12 | 6,456 | | |
| February 19–22 | 3400 | 689,325 | 29 | 6,485 | | |
| February 23 | 1160 | 690,481 | 35 | 6,519 | | |
| February 24 | 856 | 691,337 | 59 | 6,578 | | |
| February 25 | 981 | 692,261 | 4 | 6,582 | | |
| February 26–28 | 1694 | 693,929 | 40 | 6,622 | | |
| March 1 | 741 | 694,649 | 26 | 6,648 | | |
| March 2 | 696 | 695,323 | 4 | 6,652 | | |
| March 3 | 696 | 696,003 | 34 | 6,686 | | |
| March 4 | 741 | 696,717 | 23 | 6,709 | | |
| March 5–7 | 1116 | 697,775 | 35 | 6,743 | | |
| March 8 | 397 | 698,127 | 29 | 6,772 | | |
| March 9 | 470 | 698,564 | 29 | 6,800 | | |
| March 10 | 433 | 698,982 | 54 | 6,854 | | |
| March 11 | 411 | 699,362 | 15 | 6,869 | | |
| March 12–14 | 775 | 699,960 | 16 | 6,885 | | |
| March 15 | 421 | 700,361 | 14 | 6,899 | | |
| March 16 | 351 | 700,660 | 35 | 6,933 | | |
| March 17 | 331 | 700,960 | 27 | 6,960 | | |
| March 18 | 289 | 701,198 | 11 | 6,971 | | |
| March 19–21 | 560 | 701,729 | 5 | 6,975 | | |
| March 22 | 269 | 701,992 | 8 | 6,983 | | |
| March 23 | 314 | 702,288 | 30 | 7,013 | | |
| March 24 | 301 | 702,566 | 20 | 7,033 | | |
| March 25 | 189 | 702,750 | 2 | 7,035 | | |
| March 26–28 | 541 | 701,132 | 39 | 7,074 | | |
| March 29 | 351 | 701,465 | 42 | 7,115 | | |
| March 30 | 387 | 701,838 | 24 | 7,139 | | |
| March 31 | 320 | 702,152 | 5 | 7,144 | | |
| April 1 | 368 | 702,515 | 3 | 7,147 | | Today is the last day OHA will distribute a daily media release about COVID-19 cases, hospitalizations and deaths (including individual death summaries).[ |

== Government response ==
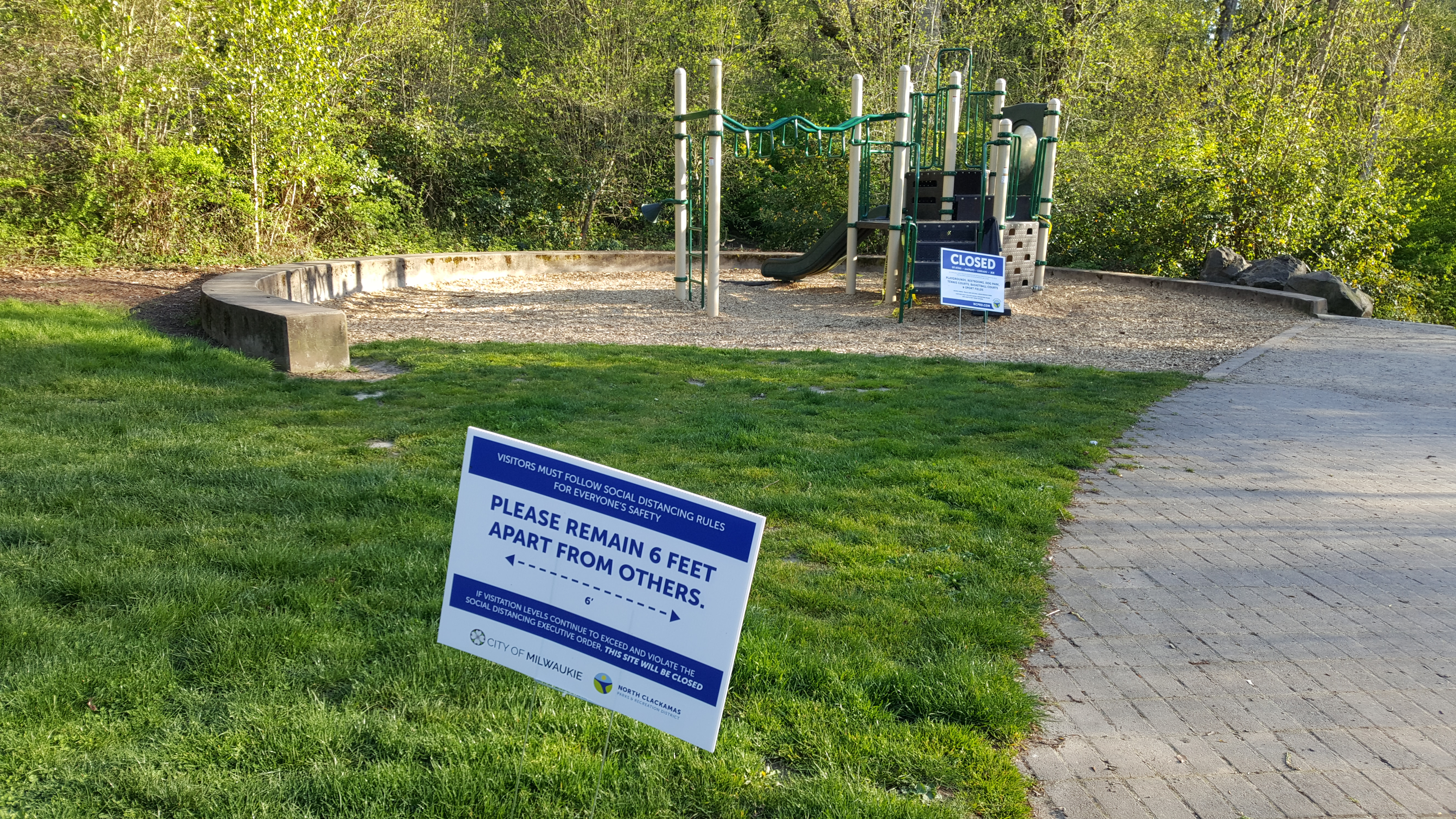
Coronavirus signage at Milwaukie's Spring Park

On February 28, 2020, Governor Kate Brown created a coronavirus response team "tasked with coordinating state- and local-level preparations for an epidemic" of coronavirus in Oregon. "[C]omposed of directors or other representatives of 12 state agencies," the response team will "keep the governor posted on the coronavirus situation internationally and give her advice on how to protect the public."

Brown issued an executive order on March 8, 2020, declaring a state of emergency because of the COVID-19 situation in the state. The order has since been extended twice and currently runs through November 3.

Brown later ordered the cancellation of events for 250 or more people.

The Oregon Medical Station is a 250-bed emergency hospital being built to treat patients of coronavirus disease 2019 at the Oregon State Fairgrounds in Salem.

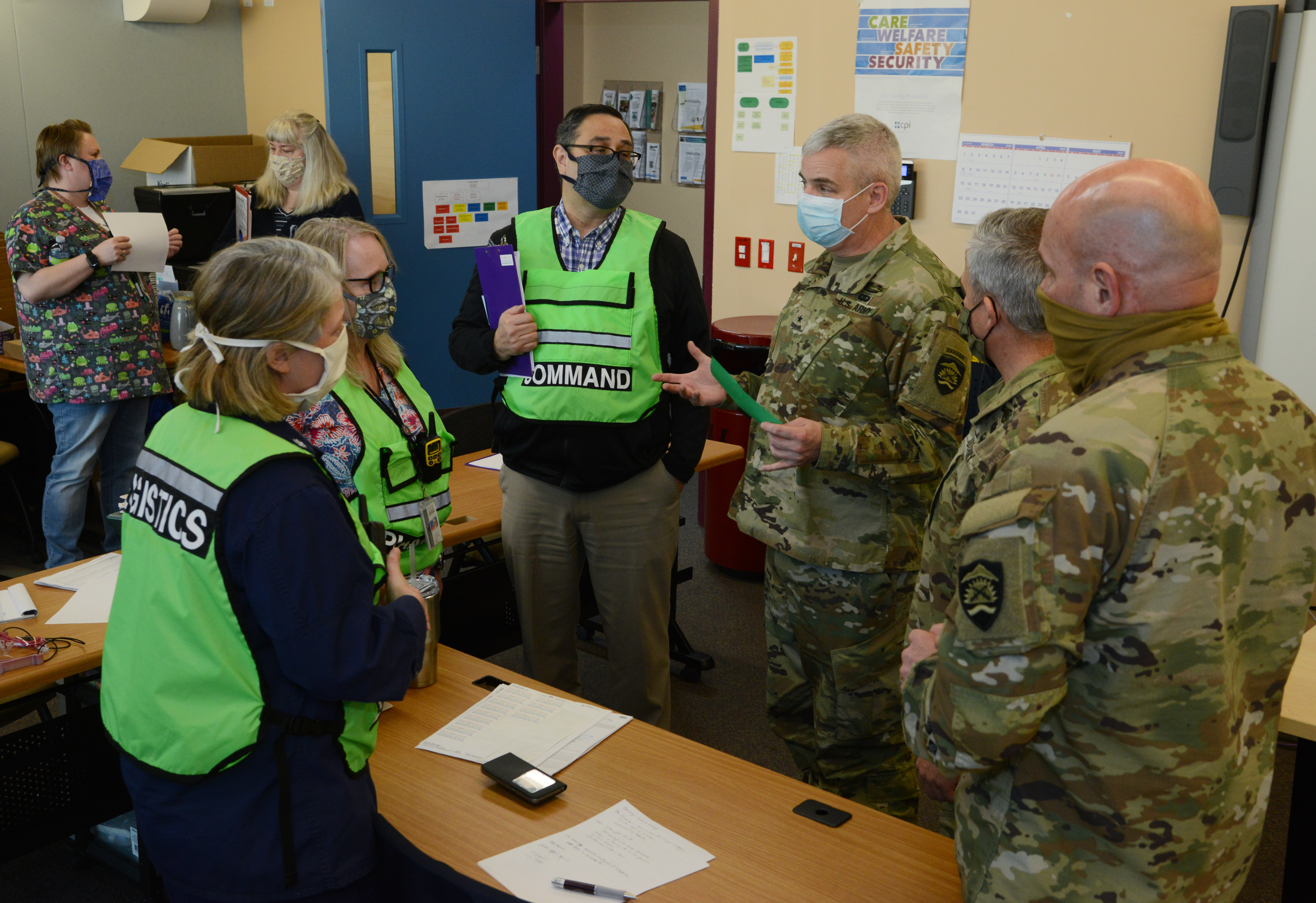
The Oregon National Guard in a group discussion with members of the Confederated Tribes of Warm Springs on PPE

After growing calls from local officials, Governor Brown issued a statewide stay-at-home order on March 23 effective immediately with class C misdemeanor charges for violators.

On March 15, 2020, the Oregon Liquor Control Commission (OLCC) which enforces the Oregon Bottle Bill suspended the enforcement until June 1, 2020, so grocers can focus on restocking, sanitation and social distancing management. The exemption was originally given from March 15 to March 31, 2020, however due to continuing social distancing and staffing concerns, it was extended until April 30, 2020, and again until June 1. It was then updated so that enforcement begins two weeks after the county in which the retailer is located enters phase 1 reopening. The enforcement will suspend again if the county falls back to baseline phase.

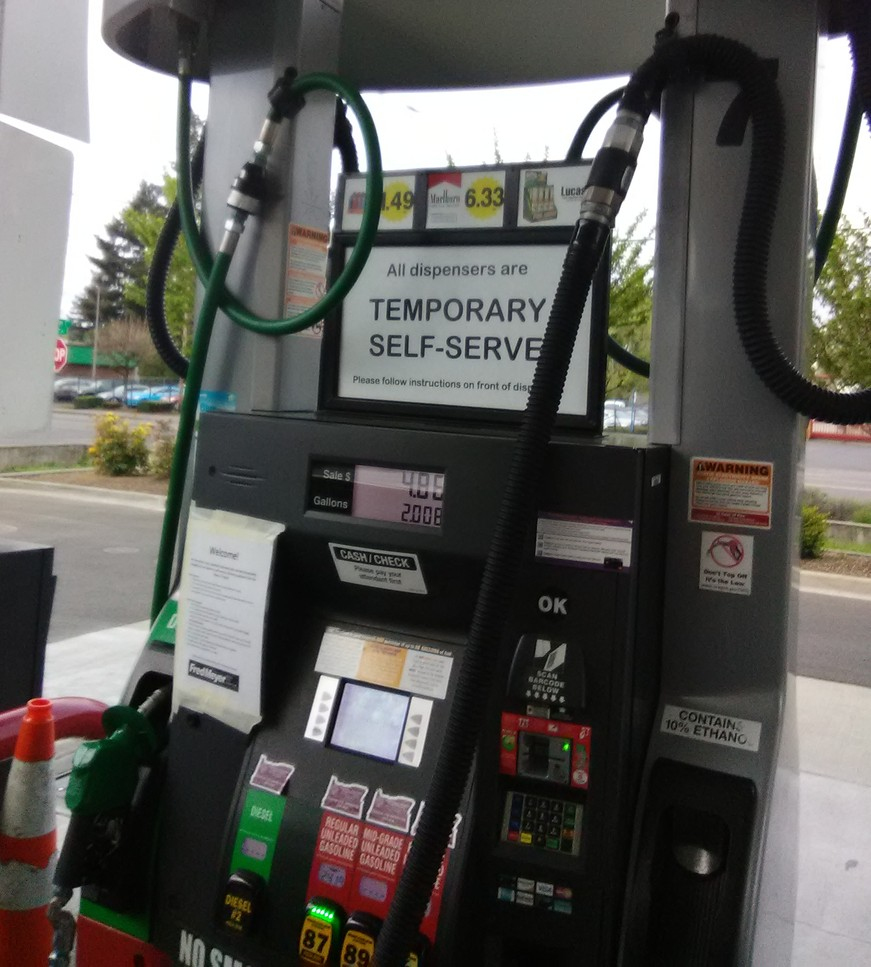
Signage at a gas pump in Portland showing temporary self-serve

Between March 28 and May 23, 2020, Oregon temporarily lifted the prohibition on self-pump at gas stations to ensure fuel is available during staffing issues related to the pandemic. Stations are allowed to let consumers pump their own gas through May 23, 2020, after the end date was extended from May 9.

On April 9, 2020, Governor Brown announced that Abbott ID NOW rapid testing machines were being sent to three rural hospitals: Curry General Hospital in Gold Beach, Pioneer Memorial Hospital in Heppner, and Lake District Hospital in Lakeview. Fifteen machines were sent to each state from HHS; the destinations of the other 12 machines were not given. Only 120 individual test kits were sent, delaying their widespread use.

On April 13, 2020, Governor Brown, together with California governor Gavin Newsom and Washington governor Jay Inslee, announced the Western States Pact, an agreement to coordinate among the three states to restart economic activity while controlling the outbreak.

On April 28, 2020, City Government of Portland, Oregon announced it will be closing some streets to through traffic to encourage distancing; however, the city has suspended the abatement of transient camps during the pandemic. City spokesperson Heather Hafer stated " forcing them to move would pose a public health and safety risk." A business owner interviewed by KATU found this ironic.

On May 2, 2020, Governor Brown extended the stay-at-home order, originally set to expire on May 7, to July 6. On May 14, Brown announced that 31 of Oregon's 36 counties had met OHA requirements to enter the first phase of a three-phase process to reopen businesses, beginning with bars, restaurants, and personal services such as hair salons.

On May 18, 2020, Baker County Circuit Judge Matthew B. Shirtcliff overturned Governor Brown's stay-at-home order, ruling that Oregon law limited executive orders for public health emergencies to 28 days. Attorney General Ellen Rosenblum appealed the ruling the Oregon Supreme Court, which granted a stay of Shirtcliff's order until the Court could rule.

On June 29, 2020, Governor Brown announced that face masks would be required indoors, effective July 1.

As of July 2020, the Oregon Occupational Safety and Health Division adopted a timeline that targets the establishment of binding COVID-19 safety regulations for September 1.

As of July 22, 2020, a test site locator has been published on the website of the Oregon Health Authority to help Oregonians find testing sites conveniently.

On November 14, 2020, Governor Brown announced a 14-day statewide "freeze" until December 2, which will limit restaurants and bars to take-out only and close gyms, indoor and outdoor recreational facilities during that period. The governor also mandates that social gatherings be limited to six people.

On November 25, 2020, Governor Brown announced a four-tier "risk level" system will start on December 3, the day the two-week "freeze" was set to end. Most counties start out in top category: Extreme.

== Economic impact ==
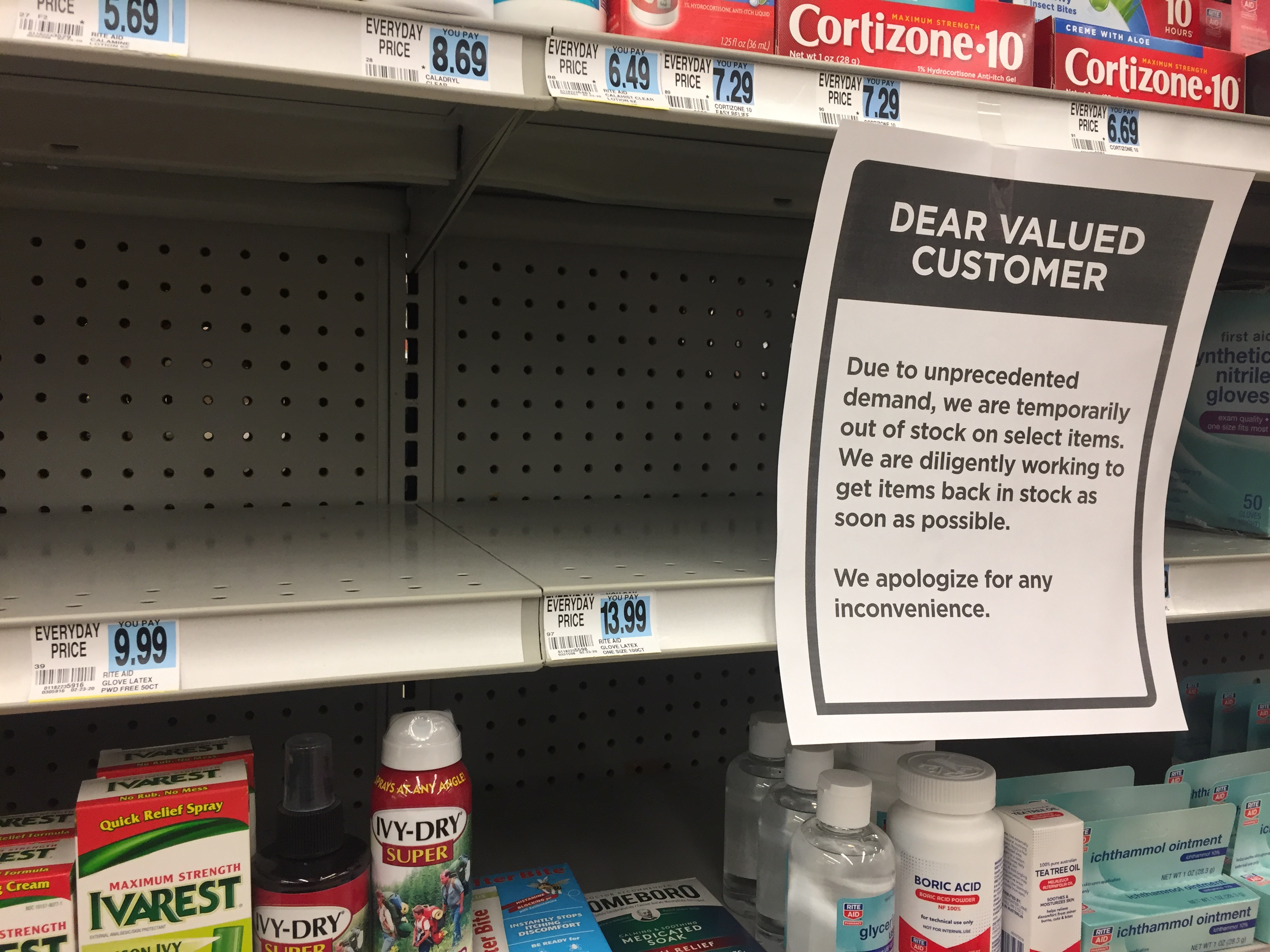
Empty latex glove shelves at a Rite Aid in downtown Portland

Oregon's largest employers, Columbia Sportswear, Intel, and Nike, lost market value because of stock declines.

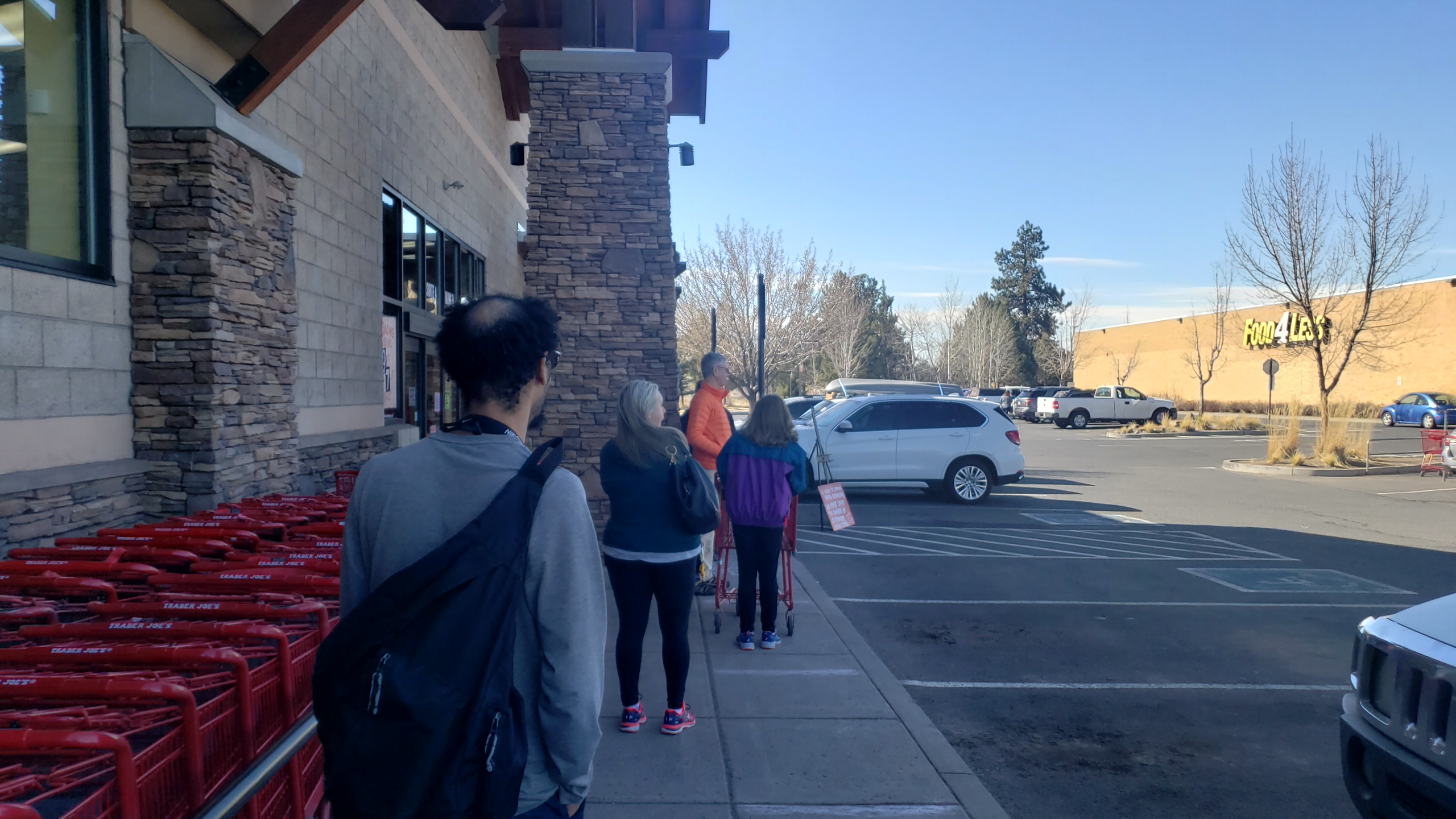
Line outside of a Trader Joe's in Bend, Oregon during COVID-19 Pandemic two weeks after pandemic declaration in response to Governor Kate Brown’s "Stay Home, Save Lives" Executive Order 20-12 on March 23, 2020

Delta Air Lines reduced flights between Portland and Japan. United Airlines cut 4 of 20 flights from Portland as well as one from Eugene. Sun Country Airlines reduced flights between Portland and Honolulu, Las Vegas, and San Francisco.

Portland's restaurant and event industries experienced slowdowns. According to the Multnomah County Health Department, "some Asian-American-owned businesses in the Jade District around Southeast 82nd Avenue had reported a drop in business 'because of the myths surrounding COVID-19.'" At least two conventions have been cancelled. Oregon businesswoman Erika Polmar led local and national efforts to lobby local, state, and federal governments for relief for small food-related businesses in the Northwest and the US. She was a founding member and leadership team member of the Independent Restaurant Coalition.

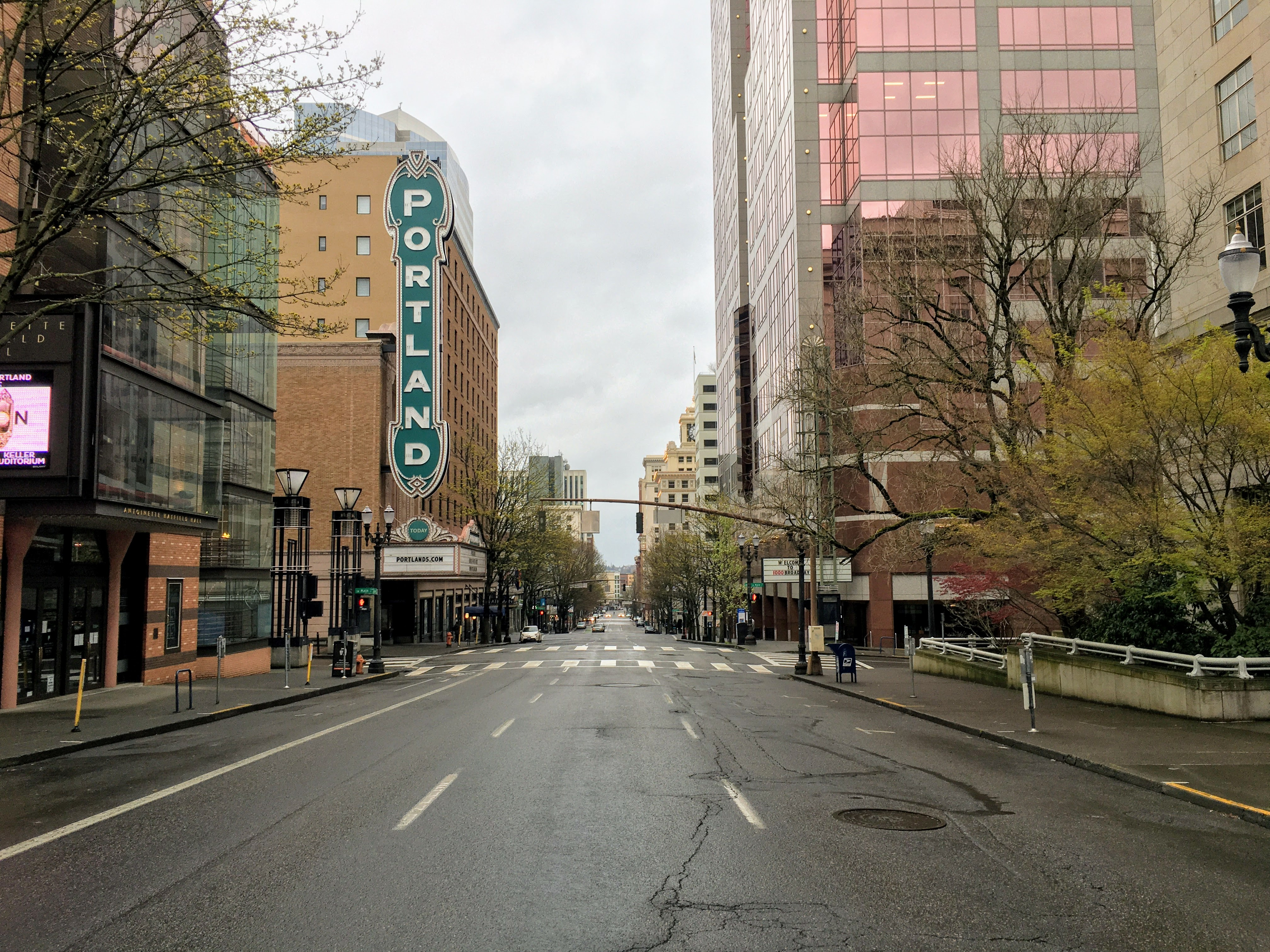
An empty downtown Portland in March 2020

Multnomah County Library closed all library branches. The Oregon Museum of Science and Industry and Portland Art Museum also closed, and City Club of Portland began hosting activities online. The Hollywood Theatre and the Tillamook Creamery have been closed temporarily.

Cannabis dispensaries were given permission to convert to curbside pickup operations by the OLCC. Medical cannabis patients were allowed to purchase up to 24 ounces per day, limited to 32 ounces per month. Cannabis sales increased during the first half of March 2020; sales were 25–30 percent higher than for the same period of time in 2019. The American Herbal Products Association's Hemp-CBD Congress, scheduled to be held in Portland in April, was cancelled.

=== School closures ===
Oregon State University, Portland State University, the University of Oregon, and University of Portland all moved to online classes. Reed College, Lewis & Clark College, Linfield College, and Willamette University did as well.

On March 12, 2020, Governor Brown ordered all K–12 schools closed statewide from March 16 to March 31. Just five days later, Brown extended the closure through April 28.

KinderCare, a nationwide preschool provider based in Portland, closed approximately 1100 of their 1500 centers, leaving the centers that have large proportions of first responders and healthcare workers.

On March 20, a worker at a Hillsboro Touchstone preschool, part of the Spring Education Group of for-profit private schools, tested positive for COVID-19. The preschool was closed for a deep cleaning and planned to remain closed for 14 days.

=== Event cancellations ===
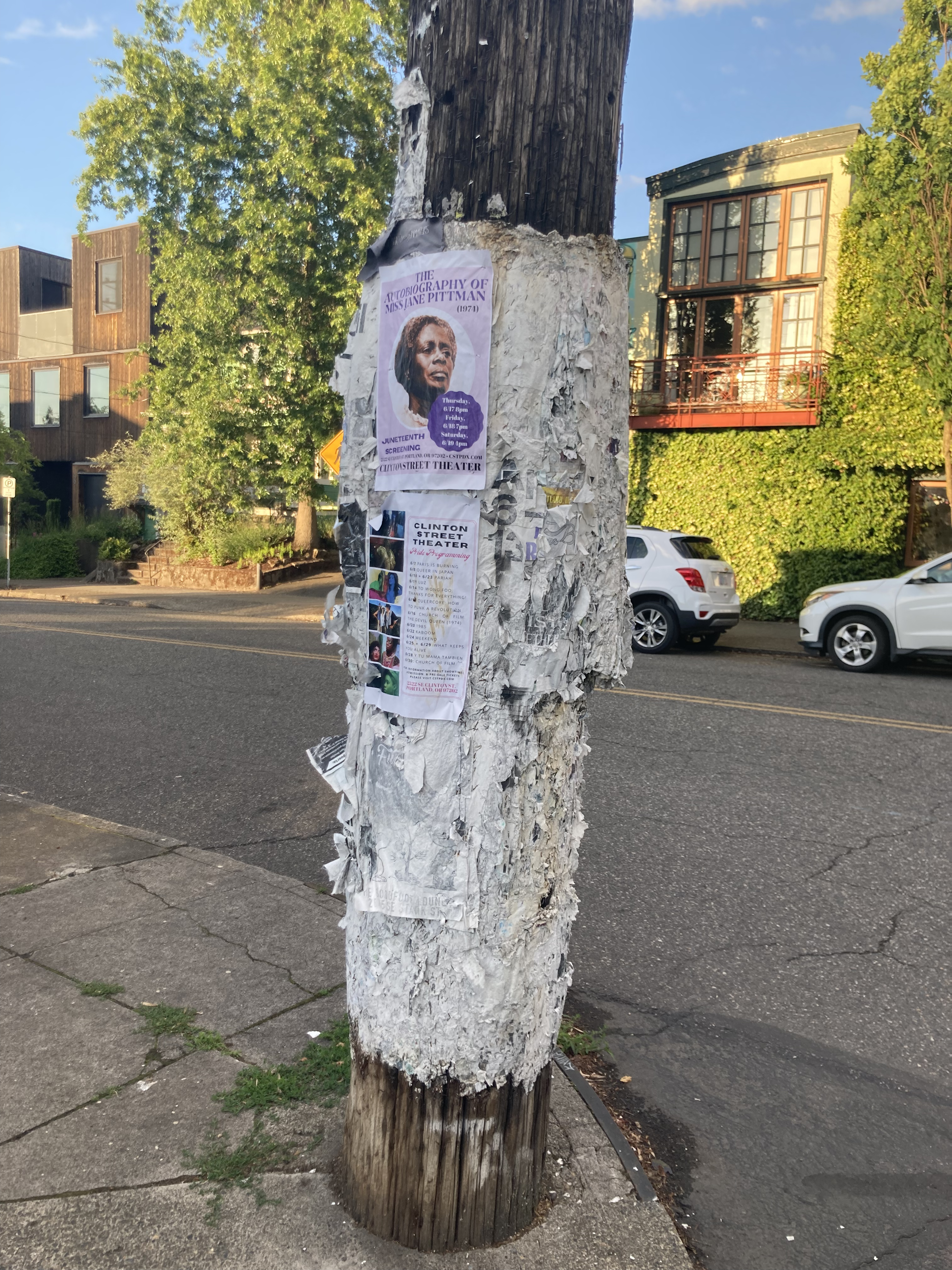
Telephone pole in June 2021, as live events started back up and flyers were posted for the first time in 15 months.

Pac-12 and Oregon State University Athletics banned participants from events, in effect March 14, 2020. Music festivals like Vortex 2020 and Oregon Jamboree were postponed.

== Impact on sports ==
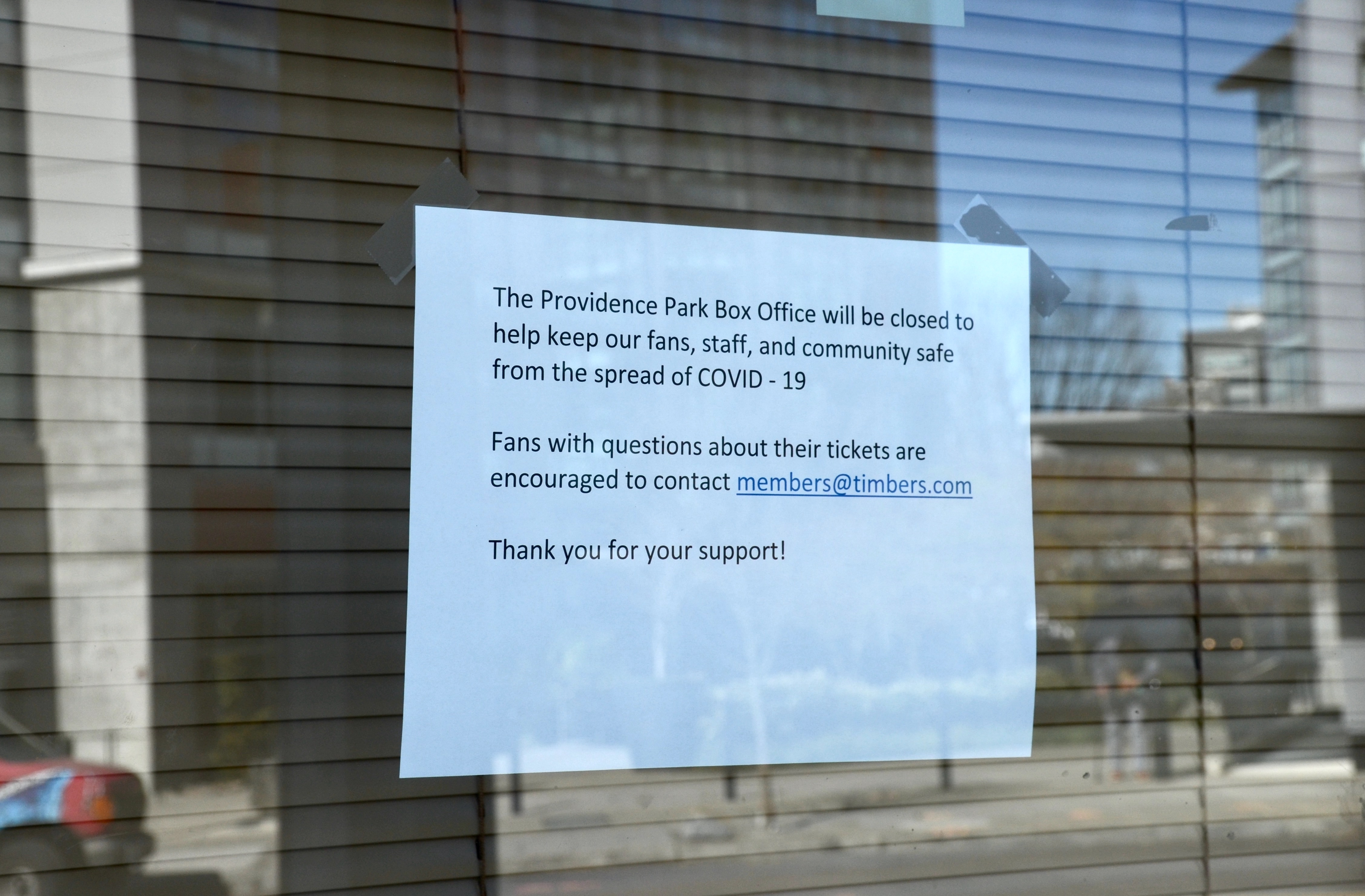
Notice posted at Providence Park indicating the stadium's closure to help prevent the spread of the coronavirus

On March 12, 2020, the National Basketball Association announced the season would be suspended for 30 days, affecting the Portland Trail Blazers. During the same day, Major League Soccer announced the league would be suspended for at least 30 days, affecting the Portland Timbers. On March 19, MLS extended the suspension until at least May 19, 2020. On March 12, Portland Thorns FC announced that their pre-season tournament, scheduled to begin March 29, was cancelled, and on April 4 the National Women's Soccer League cancelled training and games for all teams through May 5.

In college sports, the National Collegiate Athletic Association cancelled all winter and spring tournaments, most notably the Division I men's and women's basketball tournaments, affecting colleges and universities statewide. On March 16, the National Junior College Athletic Association also canceled the remainder of the winter seasons as well as the spring seasons.

== Statistics ==
COVID-19 pandemic medical cases in Oregon by county
| County (Note: County where individuals with a positive case reside. Location of diagnosis and treatment may vary.) | Cases (Note: Reported confirmed and presumptive cases. Actual case numbers are probably higher.) (Note: Includes 4 cases from unknown counties.) | Deaths | Population (Note: July 2021 population estimate from "2021 Annual Population Report Tables" (PDF). Portland State University.) | Cases / 100k |
|---|---|---|---|---|
| 36 / 36 | 974,924 | 9,544 | 4,266,620 | 22,850.0 |
| Baker | 3,852 | 65 | 16,860 | 22,847.0 |
| Benton | 22,539 | 97 | 93,976 | 23,983.8 |
| Clackamas | 85,327 | 829 | 425,316 | 20,062.0 |
| Clatsop | 6,439 | 65 | 41,428 | 15,542.6 |
| Columbia | 10,281 | 123 | 53,014 | 19,393.0 |
| Coos | 15,163 | 200 | 65,154 | 23,272.6 |
| Crook | 8,059 | 99 | 25,482 | 31,626.2 |
| Curry | 4,720 | 74 | 23,662 | 19,947.6 |
| Deschutes | 62,530 | 399 | 203,390 | 30,743.9 |
| Douglas | 26,324 | 481 | 111,694 | 23,568.0 |
| Gilliam | 327 | 6 | 2,039 | 16,037.3 |
| Grant | 2,264 | 26 | 7,226 | 31,331.3 |
| Harney | 1,977 | 44 | 7,537 | 26,230.6 |
| Hood River | 4,733 | 49 | 23,888 | 19,813.3 |
| Jackson | 55,269 | 649 | 223,827 | 24,692.7 |
| Jefferson | 9,187 | 106 | 24,889 | 36,911.9 |
| Josephine | 21,201 | 415 | 88,728 | 23,894.4 |
| Klamath | 18,168 | 255 | 69,822 | 26,020.5 |
| Lake | 1,660 | 34 | 8,177 | 20,300.8 |
| Lane | 80,639 | 742 | 382,647 | 21,074.0 |
| Lincoln | 9,466 | 114 | 50,903 | 18,596.2 |
| Linn | 33,695 | 342 | 130,440 | 25,831.8 |
| Malheur | 9,800 | 127 | 31,995 | 30,629.8 |
| Marion | 89,051 | 869 | 347,182 | 25,649.7 |
| Morrow | 3,435 | 37 | 12,635 | 27,186.4 |
| Multnomah | 174,044 | 1,500 | 820,672 | 21,207.5 |
| Polk | 20,760 | 171 | 88,916 | 23,347.9 |
| Sherman | 391 | 6 | 1,908 | 20,492.7 |
| Tillamook | 5,074 | 78 | 27,628 | 18,365.4 |
| Umatilla | 26,781 | 256 | 80,523 | 33,258.8 |
| Union | 5,876 | 96 | 26,295 | 22,346.5 |
| Wallowa | 1,592 | 23 | 7,433 | 21,418.0 |
| Wasco | 6,844 | 78 | 26,581 | 25,747.7 |
| Washington | 123,960 | 794 | 605,036 | 20,488.0 |
| Wheeler | 304 | 3 | 1,456 | 20,879.1 |
| Yamhill | 23,188 | 292 | 108,261 | 21,418.6 |
Final update May 3, 2023, with data through the previous day Data is publicly reported by Oregon Health Authority

== See also ==
- Timeline of the COVID-19 pandemic in the United States
- COVID-19 pandemic in Portland, Oregon – for impact on Oregon's largest city
- COVID-19 pandemic in the United States – for impact on the country
