= Rex Putnam High School =

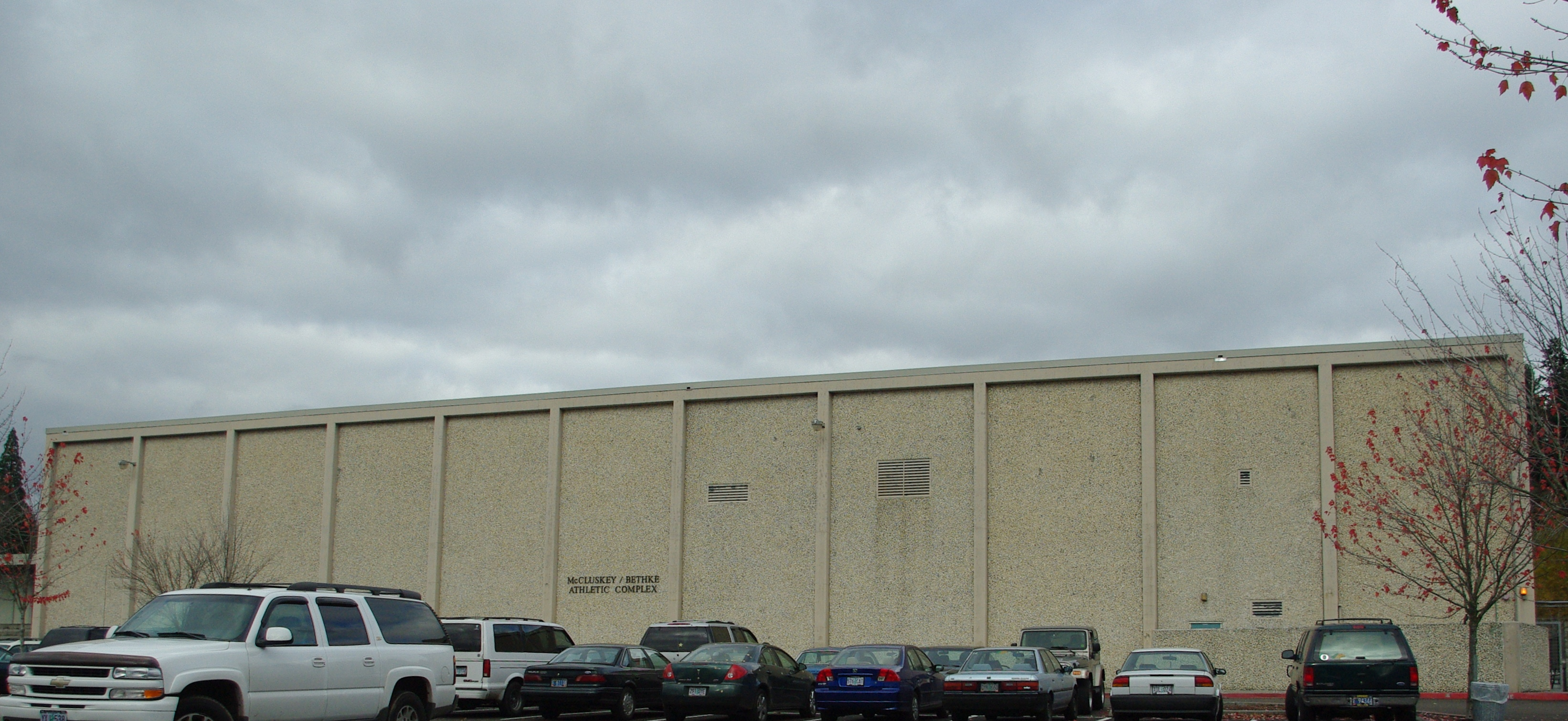
- McClusky/Bethke Athletic Complex

Location
- 4950 SE Roethe Road; Milwaukie, Clackamas, Oregon 97267; United States; 45.400°N 122.610°W

Information
- Type: Public
- Established: 1963
- School district: North Clackamas School District
- Principal: Lajena Welch
- Teaching staff: 43.87 (FTE)
- Grades: 9–12
- Enrollment: 1,106 (2024-25)
- Student to teacher ratio: 26.74
- Colors: Green and gold
- Athletics conference: OSAA, Northwest Oregon Conference
- Mascot: Kingsmen
- Rival: Milwaukie High School
- Feeder schools: Alder Creek Middle School
- Website: Rex Putnam High School

Rex Putnam High School (RPHS, colloquially Putnam) is a 4-year public high school in Milwaukie, Oregon, United States. It is the second oldest of the four public high schools in the North Clackamas School District. The attendance area includes southern Milwaukie, Oak Grove, Oatfield, Johnson City, and a small portion of Clackamas.

== History ==
The school was named after former Oregon Superintendent of Public Instruction, Dr. Rex Putnam.

Rex Putnam has been an International Baccalaureate school since the spring of 2008. As such, the school offers the International Baccalaureate Diploma Programme to its Juniors and Seniors. Approximately 46% of the Junior class and 40% of the Senior class is enrolled in one or more IB courses as of 2010. Rex Putnam is the only North Clackamas high school that houses the IB Programme.

== Academics ==
In 1985, Rex Putnam High School was honored in the Blue Ribbon Schools Program, the highest honor a school can receive in the United States.

In 2008, 81% of the school's seniors received their high school diploma. Of 306 students, 249 graduated, 31 dropped out, 11 received a modified diploma, and 15 were still in high school the following year.

The school holds an open enrollment Spanish dual language immersion program. Students can enroll after completing the program at Alder Creek Middle School, which gets its dual language students from Milwaukie-El Puente Elementary. Students can also enroll if they complete an equivalent program at another school.

== Arts ==
Rex Putnam has competed in the Northwest Oregon Conference at the 5A classification since the fall of 2010.

Rex Putnam's A Capella Choir has earned five first-place titles at the OSAA State Choir Championships, with their latest being in 2022, where they placed first in 5A.

The Rex Putnam Indoor Percussion Ensemble has competed in the NWAPA Circuit since 2016, and has competed at the WGI World Championships once in 2024, where they placed 12th in PSA.

== Athletics ==
Since 2015, Rex Putnam has only one state title in athletics, that one being a 2015 Girls Softball State Title.

In March 2024, Rex Putnam's Boys Varsity Basketball team made school program history after winning 52-42 in a state playoff game against South Albany High School, bumping their record to 21-4, the best record seen since 1964. They furthered the school's impressive run after an upset victory against the North Eugene High School Highlanders in a state quarter-final match at Linfield University, with a final score of 57-61 making their current record stand at an all-time school record high of 22-4. The school's run would end after a defeat to the Wilsonville High School Wildcats in the semifinals, throwing Rex Putnam into a 3rd Place match against the Woodburn High School Bulldogs where they would lose and place 5th in the state tournament. Their final record stands at an impressive 22-6.

== Notable alumni ==
- Bella Bixby (1995-), professional soccer player for Portland Thorns FC
- Mike Bliss (1965-), NASCAR Busch Series driver
- Scott Brosius (1966-), professional baseball player for New York Yankees, MVP of 1998 World Series
- Randy Emberlin, comic book artist
- Gabe Nevins (1991-), actor, 2007 film Paranoid Park
