= Paranoid Park =

Paranoid Park can refer to:

- Paranoid Park (novel), a 2006 young adult novel by Blake Nelson
- Paranoid Park (film), a 2007 film by Gus Van Sant based on the 2006 novel
- O'Bryant Square, a small park in Portland, Oregon whose nicknames include "Paranoid Park"
