= NUHS =

NUHS may refer to:

== Education ==
- National University of Health Sciences, an alternative medicine institution in the United States
- Nevada Union High School
- New Urban High School
- New Utrecht High School
- New Ulm High School

== Healthcare ==
- National University Health System, a group of healthcare institutions in Singapore
