= Bella Bixby =

American soccer player (born 1995)

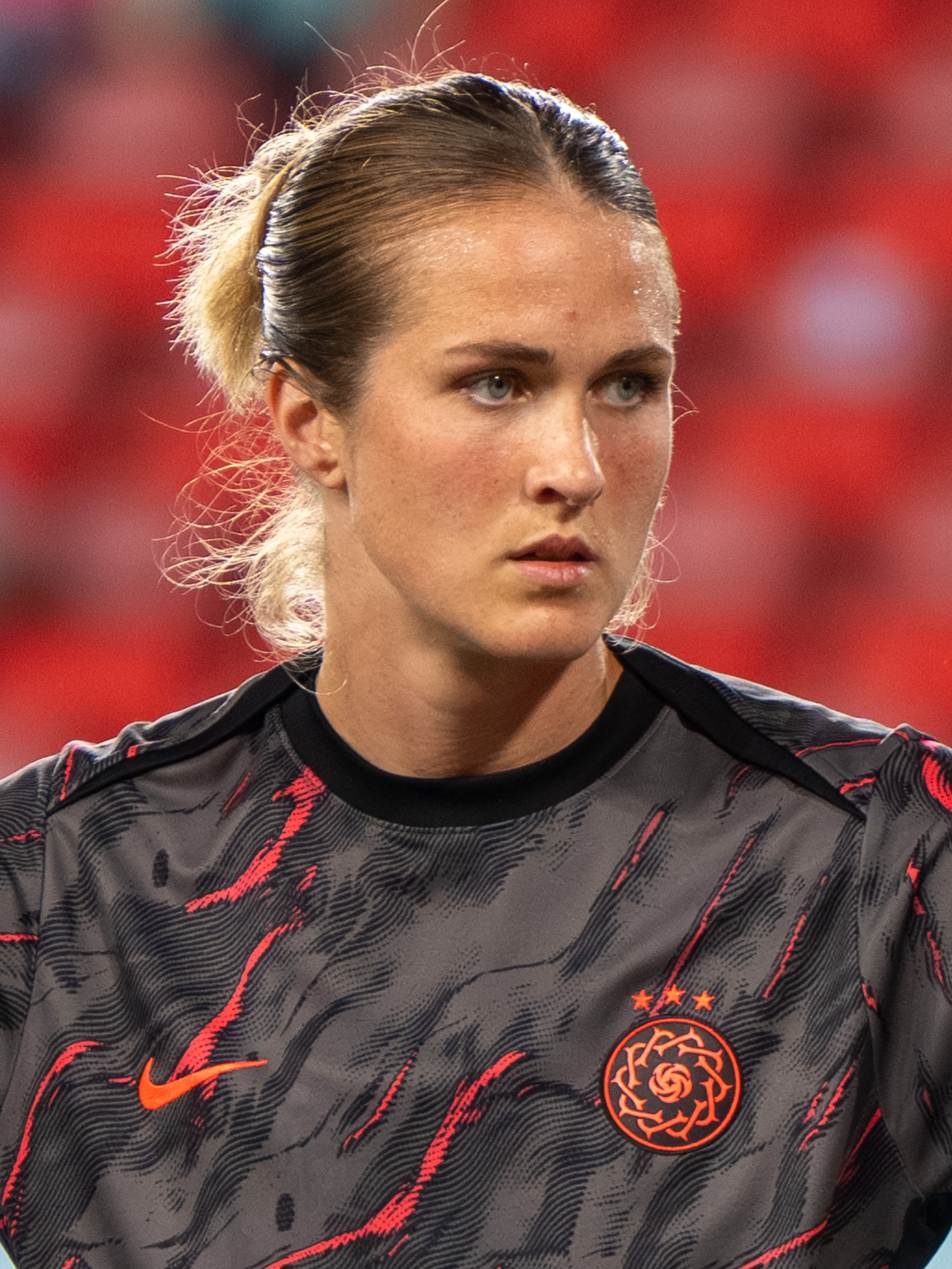
- Bixby with the Portland Thorns in 2025

Personal information
- Full name: Annabella Madeleine Bixby
- Birth name: Annabella Madeleine Geist
- Date of birth: November 20, 1995 (age 30)
- Place of birth: Milwaukie, Oregon, U.S.
- Height: 6 ft 0 in (1.83 m)
- Position: Goalkeeper

Team information
- Current team: Portland Thorns
- Number: 1

Youth career
- Lake Oswego Soccer Club
- OSSA
- 2013: Crossfire Oregon

College career
Years	Team	Apps	(Gls)
2014–2017	Oregon State Beavers	72	(0)

Senior career*
Years	Team	Apps	(Gls)
2018	Portland Thorns	0	(0)
2018–2019	1. FFC Frankfurt (loan)	0	(0)
2019	ASA Tel Aviv University (loan)		(0)
2019–	Portland Thorns	64	(1)

International career
2017–2018	United States U23		

Managerial career
- 2022–: Rex Putnam HS Kingsmen
- * Club domestic league appearances and goals as of 00:05, November 16, 2025 (UTC)

Annabella Madeleine Bixby (née Geist; born November 20, 1995) is an American professional soccer player who plays as a goalkeeper for Portland Thorns FC of the National Women's Soccer League (NWSL).

== Early life and college career ==
Bixby attended Rex Putnam High School in Milwaukie, Oregon. Bixby signed a letter of intent to play at Oregon State University on February 5, 2014.

Bixby played youth soccer for Olympic Development Program teams in Oregon, and her club teams won Oregon Premier League State Cup championships in 2009, 2011, and 2012. These clubs included Lake Oswego Soccer Club for two years, three years with OSSA, and one year with Crossfire Oregon.

Bixby also played for Putnam High School's varsity gridiron football team as a placekicker, completing 89 of 96 extra point attempts and two of three field goals, including a 40-yard game-tying field goal in the final seconds of a 2013 game. Her performances in 2013 and 2014 led to the Northwest Oregon Conference naming her both the top girls' soccer goalkeeper and top gridiron football extra point attempt kicker.

=== Oregon State University ===
Bixby attended Oregon State University and played 72 games for its women's soccer team. She posted 18 clean sheets while setting a university record for most career saves with 394.

== Club career ==
Prior to the 2018 NWSL College Draft, Portland Thorns FC coach Mark Parsons asked Bixby to register for the draft, in which Portland traded for the 29th overall pick and selected her.

=== Portland Thorns FC, 2018– ===
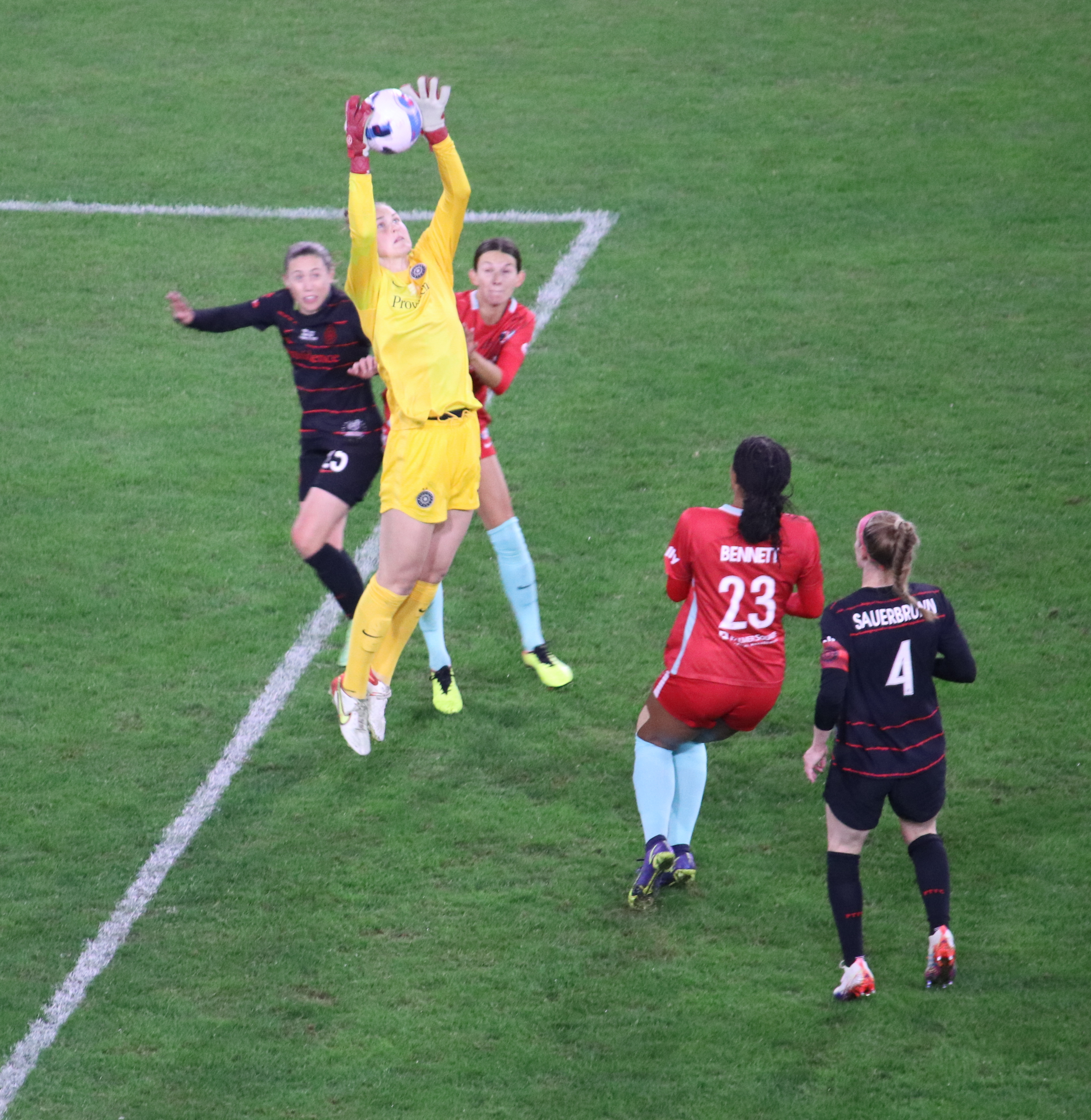
Bixby makes a save in the 2022 NWSL Championship en-route to posting a clean sheet.

Bixby was injured for most of her first year with Portland and was forced to miss most of the year after suffering a wrist injury while on loan in Germany. She then spent part of 2019 on loan in Israel.

Bixby made her professional debut for the Thorns on June 27, 2020, in the 2020 NWSL Challenge Cup, a 2–1 loss to the North Carolina Courage. After posting two clean sheets in her first four games for the club, she suffered an ACL injury that forced her to miss the rest of the Challenge Cup.

In July 2021, Bixby set the NWSL record for most shutout minutes to start an NWSL regular-season career, starting the 2021 NWSL season with 269 consecutive shutout minutes across her first three games, becoming the third goalkeeper in the league's history to post back-to-back clean sheets in their regular season debuts. She won the Save of the Week Award for the first week of August 2021. She was one of three finalists for NWSL Goalkeeper of the Year for the 2021 season.

Prior to the 2022 season, Thorns FC signed Bixby to a three-year contract extension. In 2022, Bixby registered a total of 74 saves and 11 shutouts in 26 appearances across the 2022 NWSL Challenge Cup, regular season, and playoffs, including a 2–0 shutout win against Kansas City Current in the 2022 NWSL championship match. Her 10 regular- and post-season shutouts led all NWSL goalkeepers, and her 0.96 average goals conceded per match trailed only Phallon Tullis-Joyce.

On April 29, 2023, Bixby scored the game-tying goal in stoppage time in a home match against Angel City FC, securing a 3–3 draw. It was just the second goal ever scored by a keeper in NWSL history (the first was also scored by a Thorns keeper, Michelle Betos, in 2015).

Due to her maternity leave, Bixby did not play for Thorns FC in 2024. Prior to the 2025 NWSL season, the club extended Bixby's contract through an additional season with an option.

On June 21, 2025, Bixby reached her 27th career clean sheet for the Thorns, breaking the club record which had previously been held by AD Franch.

On January 31, 2026, it was announced that Bixby had been placed on the season ending injury list for the 2026 season after having sustained an ACL tear during the Thorns' preseason training in Santa Barbara.

=== 1. FFC Frankfurt, 2018 ===
On August 31, 2018, Thorns FC announced that the club had loaned Bixby to Frauen Bundesliga club 1. FFC Frankfurt. She did not appear for Frankfurt before suffering a right wrist injury, and on October 16, 2018, the German club announced that Bixby would return from her loan to Portland early for recovery.

== Coaching career ==
In 2022, Bixby returned to Rex Putnam High School to serve as the girls' varsity soccer team's head coach.

== Activism ==
Bixby has been outspoken on issues within soccer, calling out inconsistent media coverage of the NWSL and the quality of the NWSL's broadcast product. In early July 2021, she called for the league to drop the "W" from its name, stating that it was both non-inclusive and that it promoted the misconception that the women's side of the game was abnormal. In late-July 2021, she called on Racing Louisville FC to end the light show at Lynn Family Stadium played after Louisville scored, stating that "players reported feeling physically ill. I am someone who has sensory integration issues & had to put a towel over my eyes and pray to god I didn't have a meltdown seconds before the 2nd half."

Bixby took part in the NWSL Players Association's #NoMoreSideHustles campaign for better compensation for women's football players, revealing that she had to have a second job for Uber for a year while playing in the NWSL. The NWSL Players Association also named Bixby one of the Thorns' player representatives for 2022.

Five days prior to Thorns FC's November 14 match against Chicago Red Stars in the 2021 NWSL playoff semifinals, Bixby's father Dean died by suicide. Bixby publicly spoke out about the loss in order to raise awareness.

== Personal life ==
In December 2018, Bixby married her husband Elliot and began using her married name. In January 2024, they announced Bixby was pregnant.

Bixby is on the autism spectrum.

While playing, Bixby continues to study toward a master's degree in fish and wildlife administration at Oregon State.

== Honors ==
Portland Thorns FC

- NWSL Community Shield: 2020
- NWSL Challenge Cup: 2021
- International Champions Cup: 2021
- NWSL Shield: 2021
- NWSL Save of the Week: 2021 weeks 11, 17; 2022 week 8
- NWSL Championship: 2022
