= Gender Blender =

2006 novel by Blake Nelson

- Author: Blake Nelson
- Language: English
- Genre: Young adult fiction
- Publisher: Random House
- Publication date: March 2006
- Publication place: United States
- ISBN: 0-385-74696-2
- Preceded by: Prom Anonymous
- Followed by: Paranoid Park

Gender Blender (ISBN 0-385-74696-2, 2006) is a young adult novel written by Blake Nelson. The book explores the differences between males and females and dramatizes it in a way that children will understand.

== Summary ==
Emma and Tom both try to jump onto the same school trampoline and have a serious collision, somehow switching bodies. Emma is now Tom, and Tom is Emma. Both characters face challenges from the differences in the biological bodies that they inhabit and figuring out how to act in accordance with the expectations of others. Eventually, they have another collision and become themselves again.

== Publisher ==
This book was published by Random House on 28 March 2006.

== Reception ==
The Booklist describes Gender Blender as "Freaky Friday with a gender-bending twist" and recommends it as a comedy that encourages deep thinking, although it noted that the book's ending "is a bit of a jumble". The reviewer for School Library Journal says "most readers will be disappointed by the lack of substance." Kirkus Reviews calls it "a message-driven but enjoyable read". Publishers Weekly notes the author's "keen understanding of peer pressure and gender stereotyping".
