= North Clackamas School District =

School district in Oregon, United States

North Clackamas Schools

Location
- Milwaukie, Oregon United States

District information
- Type: Public
- Grades: K-12
- Superintendent: Dr. Shay James
- Schools: 33
- Budget: $129 million

Students and staff
- Students: 17,260
- Teachers: 767
- Staff: 830
- Colors: Electric Blue and Lime Green

Other information
- Website: www.nclack.k12.or.us

North Clackamas School District (NC12) serves more than 40 square miles and is located 7 miles from downtown Portland. Included are the incorporated cities of Milwaukie, Happy Valley, and Johnson City, parts of Damascus, and the neighborhoods of Oak Grove, Concord, Clackamas, Sunnyside, Mount Scott, Southgate, and Carver. The North Clackamas School District 12 spends $8,053 per pupil in current expenditures. The district spends 59% on instruction, 38% on support services, and 4% on other elementary and secondary expenditures.

== Demographics ==
The North Clackamas School District 12 had a grades 9-12 dropout rate of 4% in 2008. The national grades 9-12 dropout rate in 2007 was 4.4%. In the North Clackamas School District 12, 13% of students have an IEP (Individualized Education Program). An IEP is a written plan for students eligible for special needs services. The North Clackamas School District 12 serves 14% English Language Learners (ELL). ELL students are in the process of acquiring and learning English Language skills.

=== Student enrollment ===
Year	2007-2008	2008-2009	2010-2011	2011-2012
Total	17,569	17,508	17,508	17,260
English Learners	2,134	2,118	2,060	1,939
Special Education	1,995	2,096	2,259	2,402
Free & Reduced-Price Lunch	5,594	6,107	7,325	7,612

=== Student-teacher ratio ===
The North Clackamas School District 12 has 20 students for every full-time equivalent teacher, with the Oregon state average being 19 students per full-time equivalent teacher.

=== Student composite ===
Some students are in more than one category.

Year	2007-2008	2008-2009	2009-2010	2011-2012
Total	17,569	17,508	17,508	17,260
Hispanic/Latino/Spanish	?	?	?	2,736
Asian/Pacific Islander	1,399	1,441	1,344	1,835
EuroAmerican/White	12,729	12,673	14,780	14,815
African American/Black	510	550	679	680
American Indian/Alaska Native	285	302	954	1,007
Russian/Ukrainian/East European	413	925	925	1,128

In the 2010-11 school year, the district had 344 students classified as homeless by the Department of Education, or 2% of students in the district.

== Boundary ==
The district is entirely in Clackamas County and includes all of Milwaukie, all of Johnson City, most of Happy Valley, and portions of Gladstone and Portland. Additionally, it includes most of the following census-designated places: Oak Grove and Oatfield, along with portions of the CDPs of Damascus and Jennings Lodge.

== List of schools ==
=== Elementary Schools (K-5) ===
Name	Location	Opened	Mascot	Colors	Students	Feeder Into
Ardenwald	Milwaukie	2009	Allstar	Red/Blue	396	Rowe Middle
Beatrice Morrow Cannady	Happy Valley	2019	Advocate	Red/Black	487	Happy Valley Middle
Bilquist	Oak Grove	1960	Bronco	Blue/Black	365	Alder Creek Middle
Happy Valley	Happy Valley	1892	Cougar	Blue/Yellow	486	Happy Valley Middle
Linwood	Milwaukie	1963	Lion	Blue/Yellow	381*	Rowe Middle
Lot Witcomb	Milwaukie	1958	Wolf	Blue/White	413	Rowe Middle
Milwaukie/El Puente	Milwaukie	1916	Bobcat	Red/Blue	426*	Rowe Middle
Mount Scott	Happy Valley	1989	Eagle	Blue/Green	389	Rock Creek Middle
Oak Grove	Oak Grove	1963	Dragon	Red/Black	299	Alder Creek Middle
Oregon Trail	Clackamas	1993	Wildcat	Purple/Blue	474	Rock Creek Middle
Riverside	Oak Grove	1955	Lion	Blue/Orange	332*	Alder Creek Middle
Scouters Mountain	Happy Valley	2009	Wolf	Green/Black	483	Happy Valley Middle
Seth Lewelling	Milwaukie	1963	Leopard	Green/Yellow	283	Rowe Middle
Sojourner	Milwaukie	1998	Blue Heron	Blue/Purple	159	
Spring Mountain	Happy Valley	2000	Hawk	Blue/Cyan	413	Rock Creek Middle
Sunnyside	Clackamas	1884	Roadrunner	Blue/Yellow	444	Rock Creek Middle
Verne A. Duncan	Damascus	2009	Firefly	Red/White	424	Happy Valley Middle
View Acres	Oak Grove	1964	Viking	Blue/Yellow	380	Alder Creek Middle

*Includes magnet students

==== Magnet schools ====
- Milwaukie El Puente (Bilingual Program)
- Sojourner (Multiple Intelligences)
- Riverside (Bilingual Program)

=== Middle schools (6-8) ===
Name	Location	Opened	Mascot	Colors	Students	Feeder Into
Alder Creek	Oak Grove	2002	Wildcat	Yellow/Black	890	Rex Putnam High
Happy Valley	Happy Valley	2009	Heron	Blue/Black	1,063	Adrienne C. Nelson High
Rock Creek	Clackamas	2011	Wolf	Blue/White	920	Clackamas High
(Wilbur D.) Rowe	Milwaukie	1963	Shamrock	Green/Black	729	Milwaukie High

In 1987 Rowe had a sister school relationship with Drewsey School in Harney County, Oregon. The sister school relationship was established because two teachers, one in each school, were sisters. The sisters wanted rural and urban students to understand one another, and sought approval from the respective boards of trustees.

=== High schools (9-12) ===
Name	Location	Opened	Mascot	Colors	Students
Adrienne C. Nelson High School	Damascus	2021	Hawk	Black/White	1,104
Clackamas High School	Clackamas	1957	Cavalier	Red/Black	1,535
Milwaukie High School	Milwaukie	1907	Mustang	Maroon/Gold	1,217*
Milwaukie Academy of the Arts	Milwaukie	2007	Mustang	Purple/Yellow	N/A
New Urban High School	Oak Grove	2003	Phoenix	Purple/Red	61
Rex Putnam High School	Oak Grove	1963	Kingsmen	Green/Yellow	1,162

*Includes MAA students

==== Professional technical center ====
- Sabin-Schellenberg Center

==== High school programs ====
- PACE (Parenting, Academics, Careers & Employment)

=== Charter schools ===
- Cascade Heights Public Charter School (K-8)
- Clackamas Middle College (9-12)
- Clackamas Web Academy (1-12)
- Milwaukie Academy of the Arts (9-12)
- New Urban High School (9-12)

=== Closed schools ===
- Milwaukie Junior High School (closed 2008)
- John McLoughlin Middle School (closed 2003) - Building now houses the Sabin-Schellenberg Professional Technical Center (South Campus)
- Wichita Elementary School (closed 2010)
- Sunrise Middle School (Closed 2010)
- Campbell Elementary School (closed 2011)
- Clackamas Elementary School (closed 2011)
- Concord Elementary School (closed 2014)

== School Board ==
The North Clackamas School District Board of Directors consists of seven local citizens, elected at large for four-year terms. The board's responsibility is to represent the community in giving direction and developing policies for the operation of the district, establishing educational goals and objectives, adopting a budget to carry out the programs of the district, and evaluating the programs of the district. The District Superintendent is Dr. Shay James.

The current board of directors consists of:

Position	Name	Term ends
1	Paul Kemp	2027
2	Jena Beneloga	2027
3	Glenn Wachter	2027
4	Tory McVay	2029
5	Samantha Tamtreng	2029
6	April Olson	2029
7	April Dobson	2027

=== Controversy ===
In late 2022, following disruptions of a board meeting by parents claiming reverse discrimination and accusing the district having a pro-LGBTQ bias, meetings were moved online. Board member at the time Libra Forde stated that many parents no longer felt safe attending the meetings in person.

== See also ==
- List of school districts in Oregon
