= Milwaukie High School =

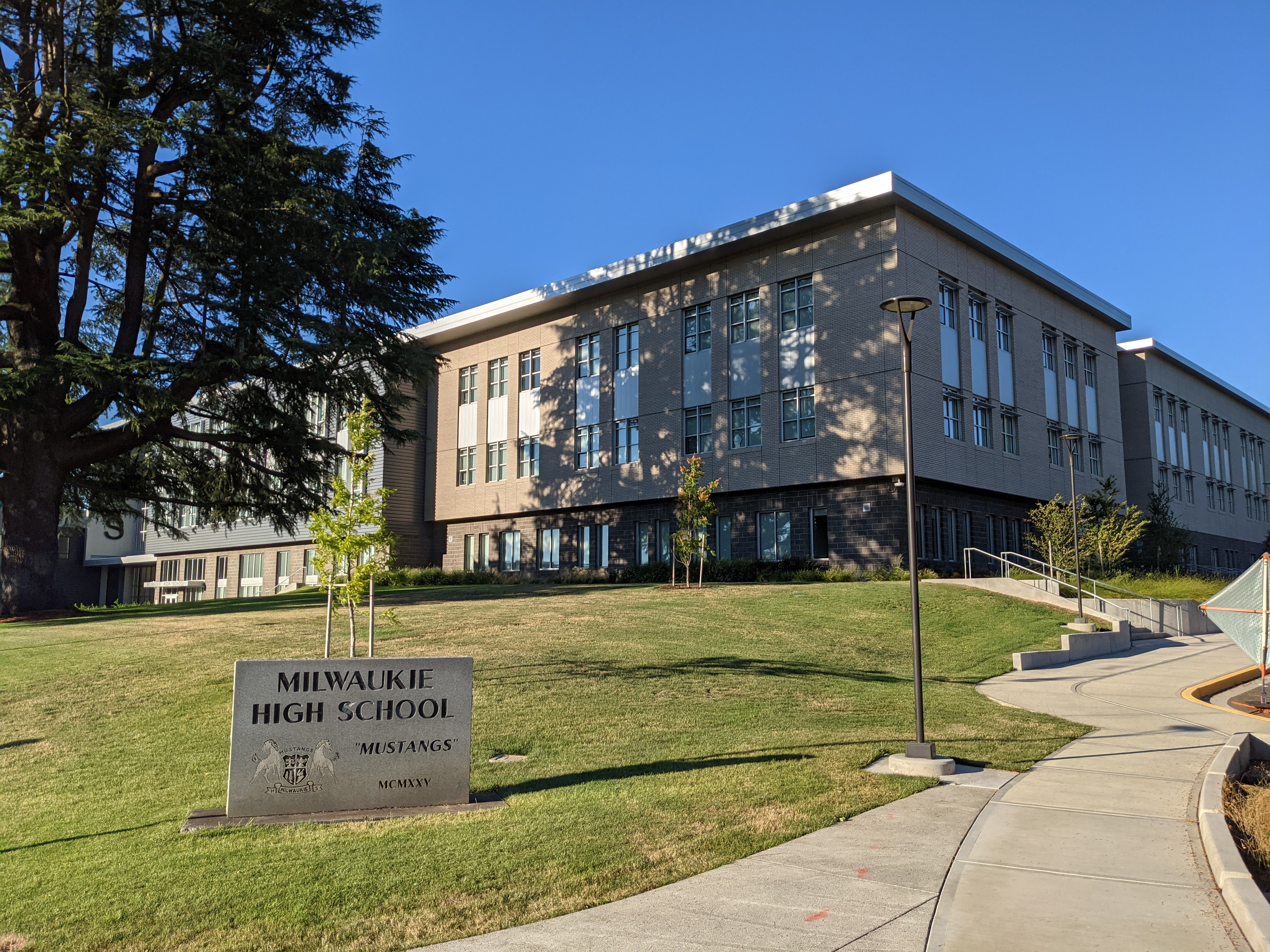
- Southwest approach to main building

Location
- 2301 SE Willard St. Milwaukie, Oregon 97222; United States; 45.4415°N 122.6379°W

Information
- School type: Public
- Established: 1907
- School district: North Clackamas School District
- Principal: Louis Mair
- Teaching staff: 48.57 (on an FTE basis)
- Grades: 9-12
- Enrollment: 962 (2023-2024)
- Student to teacher ratio: 19.81
- Campus type: Suburban
- Colors: Maroon and gold
- Athletics conference: OSAA, Northwest Oregon Conference
- Mascot: Mustang
- Rival: Rex Putnam High School
- Feeder schools: Rowe Middle School
- Website: Milwaukie High

Milwaukie High School (MHS) is a public high school located in Milwaukie, Oregon, United States. It is one of four public high schools within the North Clackamas School District. The school's mascot is the Mustang, and its colors are maroon and gold.

== History ==
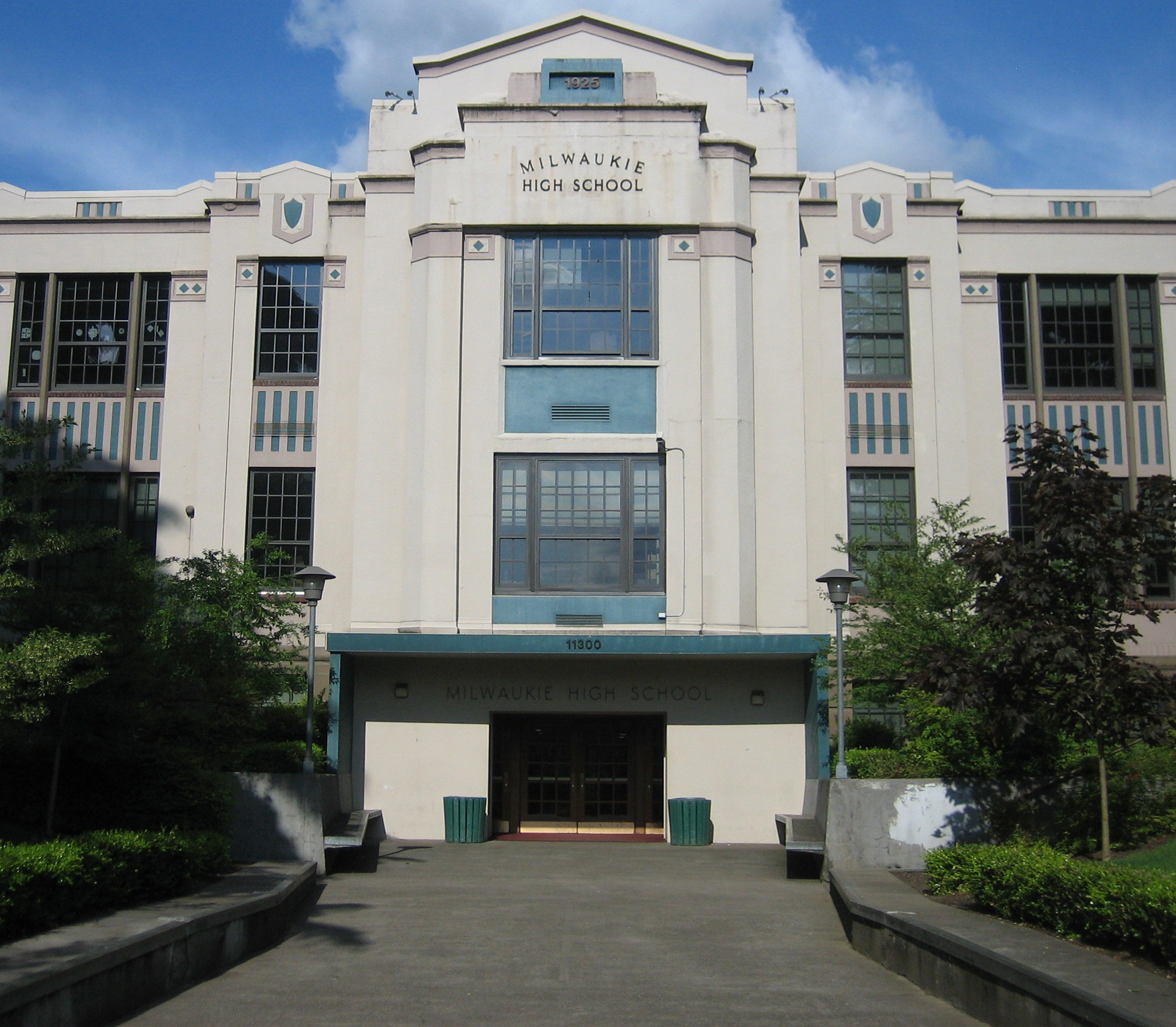
The front (west entrance) of the second Milwaukie High School main building before it was replaced.

Milwaukie High School was built in 1907. The first building was replaced in 1925. The current Gym was rebuilt following the Columbus Day storm in 1962. In 2018, the building was deemed unsafe. Therefore, it was rebuilt in the same location with a similar footprint. Along with a new building, the Gym and Commons (built in 1995) were remodeled, including a newly designed gym floor and modern lighting. The school operated for two years in trailers built in the current track and field areas. The new building was finished in the fall of 2020, with students slated to return amidst the COVID-19 pandemic in 2021. The new main building was dedicated with a ribbon-cutting ceremony on October 8, 2021.

The school's first mascot, the Maroon, fell into disfavor with students because of its similarity to the word "moron." The student body voted on a new mascot, and as a result, the mustang was chosen.

In 2005, the school added the Milwaukie Academy of the Arts to its campus. This is a charter school that operates with Milwaukie High School's main campus to offer a full course catalog. The school focuses on integrating the arts into core school subject areas.

In 2023, beloved football coach Roland Aumeller ("Coach Aum") passed away. A school-wide memorial was held after school on November 4. His death was mourned throughout many, through Milwaukie residents and MHS alumni. Milwaukie High renamed its stadium after Aumeller in his honor.

On August 13, 2024, World History, U.S. History and AP United States History teacher Alyson Battistel was named as Oregon's history teacher of the year. She went on to participate in the finalists for the National level competition.

In 2024, along with the rest of the North Clackamas School District, the school banned the use of cellular devices on campus during school hours. In 2025, in accordance with state law, all schools in Oregon banned cell phone use in schools.

== Reconstruction ==
In 2008, the JC Lillie Center for the Arts, the school's performing arts center, underwent a major aesthetic and structural renovation, which included a redeveloped entrance and courtyard, remodeled auditorium, and a notoriously faulty sound system.

In June 2018, the school's main campus was demolished to make space for a new academic building. Construction of the new structure started in early September 2018 and was completed in August 2021. The new facility will address many of the previous structure's issues, including overcrowding and safety concerns. The new facility was designed by the IBI Group and BRIC Architecture and is being constructed by Skanska.

Until the campus redevelopment concluded, students practiced academics in modular structures located on the school's football field, which was renovated once the academic building reopened and the structures were removed. The school unofficially named the temporary academic structures "Mod City."

A very old tree that was previously outside the main entrance had to be cut down due to it being in the way of construction. Out of respect to it, part of the trunk has been preserved and is on display on the second floor hallway. The tree was around 120 years old when cut down.

== Living History Day ==
Since 1996, Milwaukie High School has annually hosted the nationally recognized Living History Day. On this day, thousands of veterans are welcomed into the school to help educate students about past wars and provide first-hand accounts of military experiences. Unfortunately, this was cut in 2010 due to a lack of funding and staffing reductions. Portraits of Milwaukie High alumni veterans are still displayed in the school.

== Academics ==
In 2025, out of 212 seniors, 78% of them graduated. US News ranked Milwaukie High School at number seven of eight in North Clackamas District Number 12.

== Athletics ==
Milwaukie High School has competed in the Northwest Oregon Conference at the 5A classification since 2010.

The Pony Prancers dance team won first place in their division at the OSAA State Championships in 1986, 1996, 2011, 2012, and 2016. The Mustangs have two state wrestling titles. 1973 and 1984.

== Performing arts ==
Milwaukie High School holds the title of the oldest Thespian Society Troupe in the state of Oregon. Once a year, the troupe performs a series of student-directed One-act plays, dubbed the "Tournament of Plays". The audience votes on the best performance and the winning performance is taken to Oregon's State Acting Festival.

In November 2023, the troupe received heavy praise for their performance of Little Shop of Horrors, with school-wide recognition at an assembly before opening night and a sold-out performance on closing night.

== Notable alumni ==
- Dorothy Hester Stenzel, stunt pilot
- Latin Berry, former NFL player
- Kendrick Bourne, professional football player for the New England Patriots
- Dustin Corea, American-born Salvadorian professional soccer player
- Brad Ecklund, former NFL player and coach
- Gary Gordon, co-inventor of the modern optical computer mouse
- Keynan Middleton, professional baseball player for the Los Angeles Angels
- Mercedes Rose (Mercedes Cochran, class of 1990), actress
- Jerry Zimmerman, professional baseball player and coach
