= Recovery Road (TV series) =

American television series (2016)

- Genre: Teen drama
- Based on: Recovery Road by Blake Nelson
- Starring: Jessica Sula; Sebastian de Souza; Alexis Carra; Daniel Franzese; Kyla Pratt; David Witts; Sharon Leal
- Composers: Jon Ehrlich; Jason Derlatka
- Country of origin: United States
- Original language: English
- No. of seasons: 1
- No. of episodes: 10

Production
- Executive producers: Bert V. Royal; Karen DiConcetto; Beth Miller; Craig Piligian; Danielle von Zerneck; Holly Sorensen
- Running time: 41–43 minutes
- Production company: Pilgrim Studios

Original release
- Network: Freeform
- Release: January 25 – March 28, 2016

Recovery Road is an American teen drama television series based on the 2011 young adult novel of the same name by Blake Nelson. The show was picked up to series by ABC Family on December 16, 2014 and began production in April 2015. The first three episodes were released on demand on December 18, 2015 and debuted on the new Freeform on January 25, 2016. On May 13, 2016, it was announced that Freeform had cancelled the series.

== Cast and characters ==
=== Main ===
- Jessica Sula as Madeline "Maddie" Graham
- Sebastian de Souza as Wesley "Wes" Stewart
- Alexis Carra as Cynthia Molina
- Daniel Franzese as Vern Testaverde
- Kyla Pratt as Trish Tomlinson
- David Witts as Craig Weiner
- Sharon Leal as Charlotte Graham
- Lindsay Pearce as Rebecca Granger

=== Recurring ===
- Paula Jai Parker as Margarita Jean-Baptiste
- Haley Lu Richardson as Ellie Dennis
- Meg DeLacy as Nyla French
- Keith Powers as Zack Henson
- Aubrey Peeples as Harper
- Emma Fassler as Laurel
- Brad Beyer as Paul

== Episodes ==
No.	Title	Directed by	Written by	Original release date	Prod. code	US viewers (millions)
1	"Blackout"	Lawrence Trilling	Teleplay by : Bert V. Royal & Karen DiConcetto	January 25, 2016	101	0.46
2	"The Art of the Deal"	Larry Shaw	Bert V. Royal & Karen DiConcetto	February 1, 2016	102	0.41
3	"Surrender"	Michael Schultz	Patricia Resnick	February 8, 2016	103	0.45
4	"Parties Without Borders"	Joanna Kerns	Holly Sorensen	February 15, 2016	104	0.49
5	"My Loose Thread"	David Paymer	Nic Sheff	February 22, 2016	105	0.46
6	"Heaven Backwards"	Chris Grismer	Michael Gans & Richard Register	February 29, 2016	106	0.45
7	"Sick as Our Secrets"	Jennifer Lynch	Julia Cox	March 7, 2016	107	0.48
8	"The Weaklings"	Andy Fickman	Teleplay by : Nic Sheff; Story by : Bert V. Royal	March 14, 2016	108	0.44
9	"Your Side of the Street"	Bethany Rooney	Karen DiConcetto	March 21, 2016	109	0.49
10	"(Be)Coming Clean"	Lawrence Trilling	Bert V. Royal & Karen DiConcetto	March 28, 2016	110	0.46

== Reception ==
Recovery Road was met with a favorable response from critics. On Metacritic, the series holds a rating of 70/100, based on five reviews.
