= Adrienne C. Nelson High School =

Public school in Happy Valley, Oregon, United States

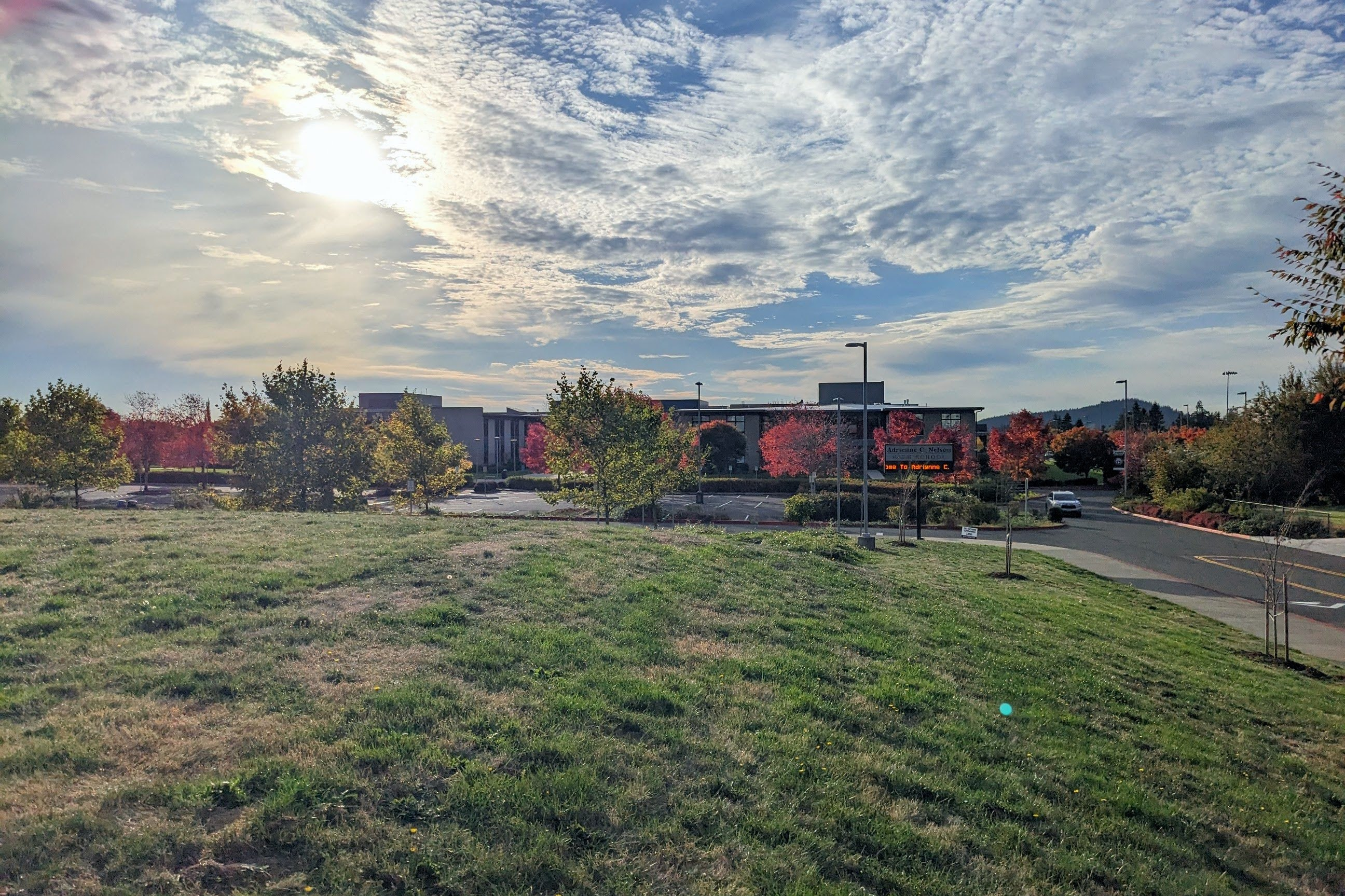
- Adrienne C. Nelson High School in 2024

Location
- 14897 SE Parklane Dr, Happy Valley, OR 97015; Happy Valley, Oregon, (Clackamas County), Oregon 97015; United States; 45.4156°N 122.4938°W

Information
- Former name: Rock Creek Middle School (relocated)
- Type: Public
- Opened: September 7, 2021
- School district: North Clackamas School District
- Principal: Greg Harris
- Grades: 9–12
- Enrollment: 1,430 (2023-2024)
- Colors: Black and Silver
- Athletics conference: OSAA 6A-4 Mt. Hood Conference
- Mascot: Hawk
- Team name: Nelson Hawks
- Rival: Clackamas High School
- Feeder schools: Happy Valley Middle School
- Website: anhs.nclack.k12.or.us

Adrienne C. Nelson High School (ANHS, colloquially Nelson High School) is a 4-year public high school in Happy Valley, Oregon. The school is the fourth and newest public high school in the North Clackamas School District.

== History ==
Adrienne Nelson High School was proposed to relieve ongoing crowding issues at Clackamas High School in a $523 million bond in 2016. The building itself was built in 2011 as a middle school with the intentions of eventually turning it into a high school.

In 2019, renovations to the school began for it to better fit a high school environment. The renovations included 16 classrooms, a performing arts center, athletics center, track and field, tennis courts, and a health center. ANHS opened for students in September 2021 after COVID-19 restrictions were lifted.

Rock Creek Middle School, the middle school that previously occupied the building, relocated to the previous site of Sunrise Middle School (located on the eastern part of the campus of Clackamas High School), which had been closed to create extra classroom space at the high school.

Nelson High School was named after Adrienne Nelson, the first African American woman to serve in the U.S. District Court for the District of Oregon.

The name was initially rejected and met with backlash in a 4-3 vote in May 2016, along with the rejection of the second choice, James DePreist High School, who is also African American. Discussions were paused after this.

In 2018, discussions resumed following the proposal to name a new elementary school after Beatrice Morrow Cannady was also met with backlash. Many did not want either school to be named after a black person, even starting petitions to instead name the high school Happy Valley High School. Other school board members stood firm on the idea. The board eventually came to a conclusion to name the schools the initial proposed names.

== Academics ==
In 2024, 93% of the students received a high school diploma. Of 325 students, 312 graduated

== Athletics ==
Nelson High School athletic teams compete in the OSAA 6A-4 Mt. Hood Conference.
