= Gabe Nevins =

American actor (born 1991)

- Born: Gabriel Allen Nevins; August 26, 1991 (age 34)
- Occupation: Actor
- Years active: 2007-2015

Gabriel Allen Nevins (born August 26, 1991) is an actor who is best known for starring in Gus Van Sant's 2007 film Paranoid Park.

== Career ==
Nevins was cast as the lead of Paranoid Park even though he was auditioning to be a skateboarding extra. The film premiered at the 2007 Cannes Film Festival as one of the 22 films in the competition, and won the special 60th anniversary prize. He was cast as an extra in Wendy and Lucy (2008), Rachel (2010) and Some Days Are Better Than Others (2011). In 2010, he starred in the short film Will.

The photographer Nick Haymes published a collection of photos of Nevins, titled Gabe, in March 2012. It featured photos of him that Haymes had taken since he first met Nevins shortly after the release of Paranoid Park. It was criticized by Vice as being exploitive.

== Personal life ==
He attended Rex Putnam High School, but eventually spiraled out of control, struggled with mental illness, drug addiction and homelessness. Through help from family and friends, Nevins has been able to get his life back together and is still occasionally seen with a skateboard at some of his favorite skate parks.

== Filmography ==
Year	Title	Role	Notes
2007	Paranoid Park	Alex	
2008	Wendy and Lucy	Teenager by car	
2010	Rachel	Kid 1	Short
2010	Will	Will	Short
2011	Some Days Are Better Than Others	Store employee	
2015	Endless		
2015	The Curio		
