= Latin Berry =

American football player (born 1967)

No. 42
- Position: Defensive back

Personal information
- Born: January 13, 1967 (age 59); Lakeview Terrace, California, U.S.
- Listed height: 5 ft 10 in (1.78 m)
- Listed weight: 196 lb (89 kg)

Career information
- High school: Milwaukie (Milwaukie, Oregon)
- College: Oregon
- NFL draft: 1990: 3rd round, 78th overall pick

Career history
- Los Angeles Rams (1990); Cleveland Browns (1991–1992); Green Bay Packers (1993)*
- * Offseason or practice squad member only

Career NFL statistics
- Return yards: 315
- Stats at Pro Football Reference

Latin Dafonso Berry (born January 13, 1967) is an American former professional football player who played three seasons as defensive back for the Los Angeles Rams and Cleveland Browns. He was drafted in the third round of the 1990 NFL Draft by the Rams.

Berry competed for the Oregon Ducks track and field team, where he placed at the NCAA championships in both the long jump and triple jump.
