= Girl (1998 film) =

- Directed by: Jonathan Kahn
- Written by: Blake Nelson (novel); David E. Tolchinsky (screenplay)
- Starring: Dominique Swain; Sean Patrick Flanery
- Cinematography: Tami Reiker
- Edited by: Gillian L. Hutshing
- Music by: Michael Tavera
- Production companies: HSX Films; Jeff Most Productions; Muse Productions
- Distributed by: The Kushner-Locke Company
- Release dates: May 6, 1998 (France); November 5, 1999 (U.S.)
- Running time: 99 minutes
- Country: United States
- Language: English

Girl is a 1998 American drama film starring Dominique Swain, Christopher Masterson, Selma Blair, Tara Reid, Summer Phoenix, Portia de Rossi and Sean Patrick Flanery. It was based on the novel of the same name, written by Blake Nelson. It was written by Blake Nelson and David E. Tolchinsky and directed by Jonathan Kahn.

== Plot ==
Andrea Marr (Dominique Swain) is a bright, straight-A, 18-year-old high school senior living a sheltered life in rural Washington. She has two close friends, bookish Darcy (Selma Blair) and rebellious aspiring rock star Cybil (Tara Reid). Andrea is insecure and confused by her budding sexuality. She has difficulty viewing herself as a woman.

In pursuit of becoming "women," Andrea and Darcy attend a frat party in attempts to lose their virginity. Both are unsuccessful, and Andrea ends up passing out and waking up with a frat boy masturbating on top of her. Upon learning of her acceptance to Brown University, Andrea realizes that she hasn't had many life experiences, so she ventures into the local rock scene with classmate and groupie, Rebecca (Summer Phoenix), to watch Cybil and her band, which is made up of two other classmates, Richard (Christopher Masterson) and Greg (David Moscow). There, she meets Todd Sparrow (Sean Patrick Flanery), the singer for a local rock band called The Color Green, and she becomes enamored with him. Andrea loses her virginity to a guy named Kevin (Channon Roe) whom she also met at the show, but she finds the experience disappointing. Later, she finds Todd at a record store and accompanies him back to his sister Carla's (Portia De Rossi) apartment where they have sex. After, Todd leaves abruptly to go to band practice, leaving Andrea upset but also obsessed with him. Andrea begins to neglect her friends, particularly Darcy, who is suffering from an eating disorder, in her pursuit of Todd.

In the meantime, Cybil reveals to Andrea that she's dropping out of high school because she got a record deal on the same label as Todd's band. However, the record deal was only offered to her and not to Richard and Greg. Richard is upset but ultimately accepting of it, whereas Greg becomes severely depressed. Cybil and her new band open for The Color Green, and Andrea goes to the show. At the show, Andrea and Todd reunite, and Andrea becomes Todd's groupie, meaning they often get together to have sex. Andrea believes it means something more, but Todd eventually breaks things off with her to go on tour, leaving her heartbroken.

Graduation day comes along, and Andrea is very somber. Unbeknownst to her, Todd comes to the ceremony and watches her from the parking lot before driving off. Andrea finds a crying Richard at graduation and learns that Greg committed suicide. Andrea goes to the class graduation party. At the party, Andrea goes upstairs and finds Darcy making herself throw up in the bathroom. Andrea apologizes to Darcy about neglecting her and makes her promise to seek treatment for her eating disorder, which Darcy agrees to. Darcy reveals that she was very jealous of Andrea because she appeared to have everything. Andrea helps Darcy clean up. When they leave the bathroom, Andrea and Darcy are verbally harassed by a classmate who used to bully Richard and Greg. Richard intervenes, reveals his longtime crush on Darcy, and asks her to dance, to which Darcy agrees. Andrea watches Darcy and Richard dance, then is approached by Cybil, who showed up to the party. Cybil expresses regret and sadness over Greg's suicide and says that she feels responsible. Andrea consoles her, and Cybil reveals her feelings for Andrea by kissing her on the lips. Andrea is surprised, and even though she doesn't reciprocate those feelings, she allows Cybil to kiss her anyway. Andrea leaves the party.

After the party, Andrea walks around for a while, thinking about everything that's happened, and she encounters Todd. They go back to Carla's apartment to talk, and Todd opens up to Andrea. He apologizes for treating her so badly and tells her that he can't go on tour without her and that he needs her. Andrea reveals that she's going to Brown in the fall, and Todd is surprised at how smart she actually is. They attempt to have sex, but they can't because Todd is unable to get an erection. Andrea leaves, breaking things off with Todd for good.

Andrea leaves for college, hopeful for her future and grateful for the experiences she has had, declaring herself a woman.

== Cast ==
- Dominique Swain as Andrea Marr
- Sean Patrick Flanery as Todd Sparrow
- Summer Phoenix as Rebecca Fernhurst
- Tara Reid as Cybil
- Selma Blair as Darcy
- Channon Roe as Kevin
- Portia de Rossi as Carla Sparrow
- Christopher Masterson as Richard
- David Moscow as Greg
