= Clackamas High School =

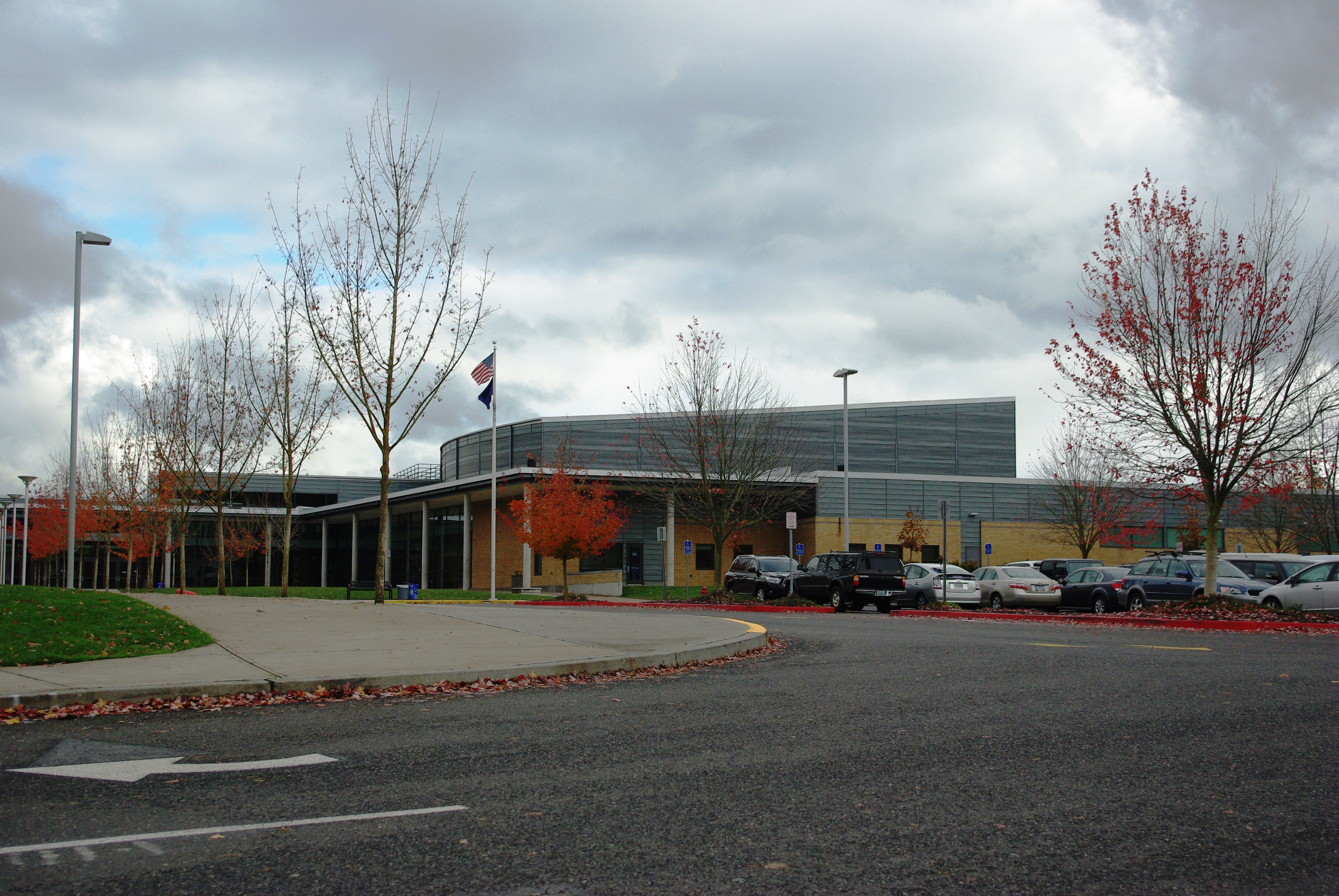

Location
- 14486 SE 122nd Avenue; Happy Valley, Oregon; United States
- Coordinates: 45.418333°N 122.535362°W

Information
- Type: Public
- Established: 1957
- School district: North Clackamas School District
- Principal: Alyssa Engle
- Teaching staff: 46.33 (FTE)
- Grades: 9–12
- Enrollment: 1,278 (2023-2024)
- Student to teacher ratio: 27.58
- Colors: Red and black
- Athletics conference: OSAA Mount Hood Conference, 6A-4
- Team name: Cavaliers
- Rival: Adrienne C. Nelson High School
- Yearbook: The Lance
- Feeder schools: Rock Creek Middle School
- Website: Clackamas High School

Clackamas High School (CHS) is a public high school located in Clackamas, Oregon. It is the second oldest of the four high schools in the North Clackamas School District.

== History ==
Clackamas High School itself was established in 1957 at a building in South Milwaukie, Oregon. Though, with its ever-growing attendance area of Happy Valley, CHS outgrew its small building. In 2002, the larger, modernized building was opened and the old building was converted into a middle school.

Starting in the early-mid 2010s, students, staff, and families began to complain about the severe overcrowding occurring. The district resolved to eventually close Sunrise Middle School, which sat on the eastern portion of the campus, to create extra classroom space. This was referred to as the 'East Campus' building, which added an extra capacity of around 1,000.

Two new middle schools opened to accommodate the students transferring from Sunrise Middle School and the addition of sixth graders to the middle school program starting in 2011. Happy Valley Middle School opened in 2009, taking around half of the students from Sunrise, then Rock Creek Middle School opened in 2011, taking the other half of the students of Sunrise, marking its closure.

Knowing that there would be an eventual need to construct a new high school, Rock Creek Middle School was constructed with the intention of it eventually becoming a high school. In 2016, the Capital Construction bond was passed which provided the funds to construct a new high school.

Construction started in 2019, and in 2021, Adrienne C. Nelson High School opened. Around half of the students from CHS were transferred to the school. The schools naturally became athletic rivals over time.

Following this construction, the East Campus building was no longer needed as all students could comfortably fit within the main building. It became the new site for Rock Creek Middle School, receiving renovations to be able to hold the new students and create proper elective spaces.

Along with the construction of the new high school, renovations were made to Clackamas High School. This redid some life skills classrooms in the building, as well as security additions, improvements to the football field, and the addition of a brand new health center. The Clackamas High School SBHC provides cost-free checkups, mental healthcare, and dentistry.

Clackamas Cavaliers logo

== Building and campus ==
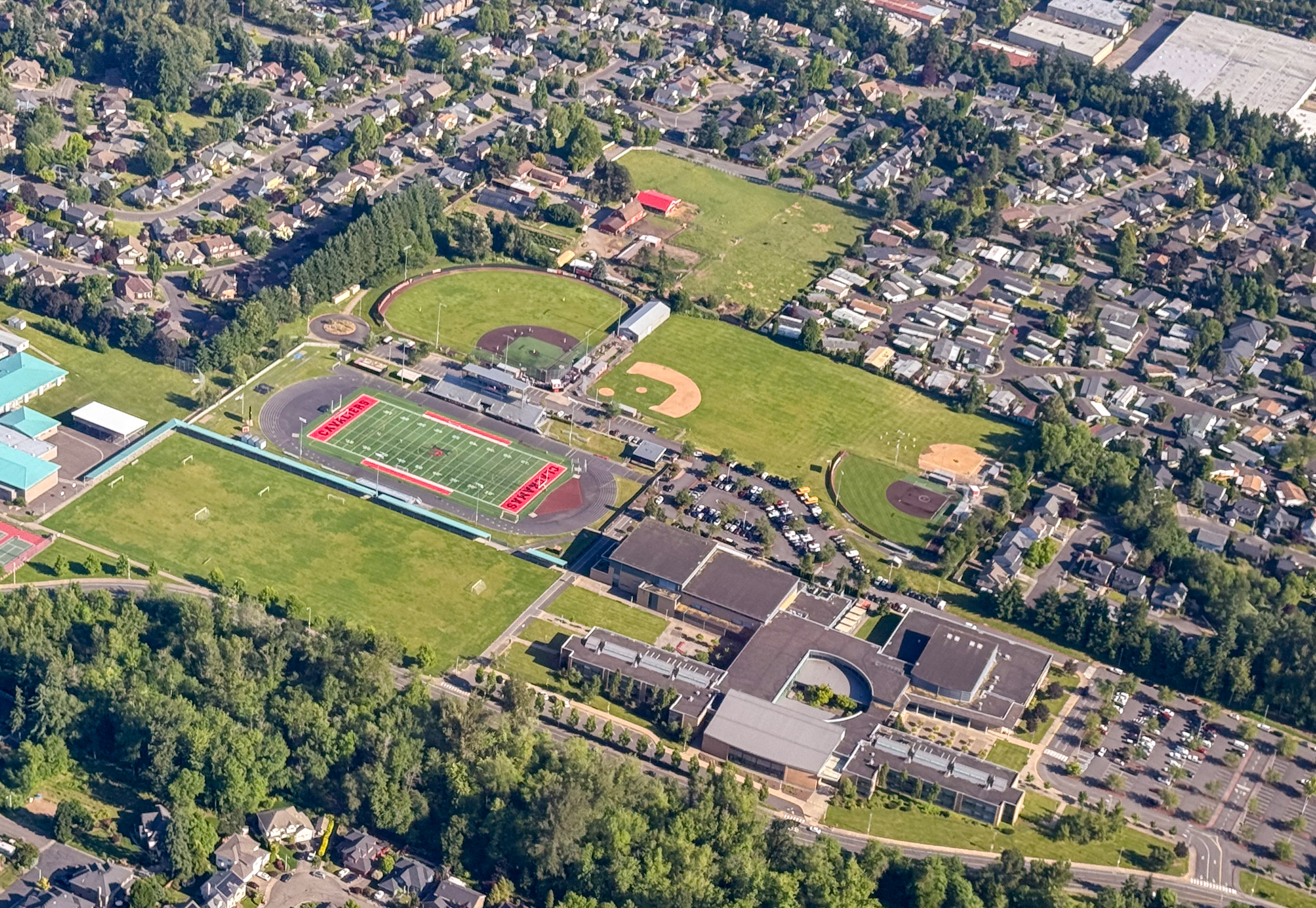
Aerial view of the high school

Clackamas High School campus lies on 69 acres (28 ha) with a small wetland nearby. The building itself has 269,354 square feet (25,023.8 m^{2}) of floor space and is much larger than the older school. It has four classroom hallways on two floors, a commons area, an arts wing, and an athletic wing, centered on an administrative ring in the middle of the school.

The classroom hallways are mostly on the north end of the school with 100 and 200 halls on the east side, and 300 and 400 halls on the west. Two science classrooms are near the entrance to each hall, and each hallway has different classes in it. The 100 hall has language arts classes, the 200 hall has social studies classes, the 300 hall has world language and miscellaneous classes, and the 400 hall as math classes. Between the hallways are the 500 and 700 halls, the 700 hall on the first floor with the library and the 500 hall on the second floor with some miscellaneous classrooms.

The arts wing (or 600 hall) of the school is centered on the schools' auditorium. The band and choir room are to the left, connected by practice rooms and instrument storage. The black box theater is behind the auditorium, which also has an office and costume storage. The makeup room and changing room for theatre performances are nearby as well. A wood shop, science classroom, and art classroom are to the right.

The athletic wing (or 800 hall) contains a large gym, a smaller upper gym, locker rooms, a wrestling room, and a weight training room. The administrative ring, located in the center of the school, contains the main office, the bookkeeper's office, the attendance office, the student management office, the schools' career and vocation center, the athletic office, and the counseling office, all centered on a small courtyard.

This building has served as a model for other high schools and has been designated a green building. Clackamas High School was built in 2002 to a design by Portland's Boora Architects and was the first high school in the country to be certified LEED Silver. Clackamas High became one of the first "solar schools" in Oregon with the installation of 2 kW solar panels on the roof in 2003. The School was also a winner of the DesignShare Recognized Value Award in 2003.

== Academics ==
In 1984, Clackamas High School was honored in the Blue Ribbon Schools Program, the highest honor a school can receive in the United States.

As of 2005, 72.5% of 10th grade students at Clackamas High School met or exceeded overall state standards for learning, compared to 53.5% of the rest of the state. In addition, 80% are ESL students and 90% are Latino.

In 2008, 92% of the school's seniors received a high school diploma. Of 589 students, 502 graduated, 69 dropped out, four received a modified diploma, and 14 were still in high school the following year.

== Awards and honors ==
In October 2005, Clackamas High was named KATU's "Super School of the Month."

In 1997, Clackamas High biology teacher Ford Morishita won the Oregon Teacher of the Year award, for his approach to teaching biology and the performance of his students.

== Notable alumni ==
- Debby Applegate – historian and biographer
- Jazzy Davidson - basketball player
- Alexandra Botez – chess player
- Kage Casey – college football player
- Cazzey Louis Cereghino – actor, singer, and novelist
- Lisa Fletcher – television news journalist
- Ben Gregg – basketball player
- Lynn Snodgrass – politician, former Oregon State Speaker of the House
- Cheryl Sorensen – basketball coach
- Ben Wetzler – baseball player
- Hailey Kilgore – Broadway actress and singer
- Cole Turner – American football player
