= Brad Ecklund =

American football player (1922–2010)

No. 23, 22, 50, 61, 56
- Positions: Center, linebacker

Personal information
- Born: May 9, 1922; Los Angeles, California, U.S.
- Died: February 6, 2010 (aged 87); Mount Holly Township, New Jersey, U.S.
- Listed height: 6 ft 3 in (1.91 m)
- Listed weight: 215 lb (98 kg)

Career information
- High school: Milwaukie (OR)
- College: Oregon (1941, 1946-1948)
- NFL draft: 1947: 20th round, 181st overall pick

Career history

Playing
- New York Yankees (1949); New York Yanks (1950–1951); Dallas Texans (1952); Baltimore Colts (1953)

Coaching
- Oregon (1958-1959) Assistant coach; Dallas Cowboys (1960–1965) Offensive/defensive line coach; Atlanta Falcons (1966–1967) Offensive line coach; New Orleans Saints (1968–1970) Offensive line coach; Philadelphia Eagles (1971–1972) Offensive line coach; Florida Blazers (1974) Defensive line coach; Chicago Bears (1975–1977) Offensive line coach

Awards and highlights
- Second-team All-Pro (1953); 2× Pro Bowl (1950, 1951); 2× First-team All-PCC (1947, 1948)

Career NFL/AAFC statistics
- Games played: 60
- Games started: 56
- Stats at Pro Football Reference

Bradford Denison Ecklund (May 9, 1922 – February 6, 2010) was a center in the All-America Football Conference (AAFC) and in the National Football League (NFL). He was chosen twice (1950, 1951) to play in the Pro Bowl. He was born in Los Angeles and died in Mount Holly Township, New Jersey.

== Early life ==
As a senior at Milwaukie High School, Ecklund was named to the Metro all-star team at fullback. He was a four-sport star—in baseball, track, basketball, and football—and was drafted by the Philadelphia Athletics, but turned down baseball for a football scholarship at the University of Oregon.

He never played for a team—freshman, varsity, military or Oregon—for which he was not named captain. He never played in a league where he was not named on the all-conference team—at fullback in high school, in college or as a professional.

Ecklund matriculated at Oregon in 1941, expecting to play fullback. But the Webfoots were loaded in the backfield, and weak up front. Coach Tex Oliver moved the massive Ecklund to center during fall camp. By the first game, at Stanford, he was first string. He started every game, but flunked out of school.

In his second season, World War II erupted and Ecklund joined the Marine Corps. He took up boxing for fun, becoming the Marine Corps Golden Gloves champion. He played for the Naval Air Station football team in Jacksonville, Florida for two years, before being dispatched for overseas duty at Okinawa.

He learned what it meant to be a member of team in the South Pacific, fighting in interminable battles from island to island. "I was in the second wave," he said in 1993. "It was the guys in the first wave who got their butts shot up."

Eckland returned to Oregon in 1946. "By being four years in the service, they forgave me" for flunking out, he said. "When I came back, I never made less than a B average. I'd matured and realized what I almost lost."

In the next three years, playing both sides of the line, he averaged over 50 minutes per game. He was All-PCC in 1947 and 1948. On Oregon's 1948 team, Ecklund played all 60 minutes of five games—Stanford, USC, Michigan, St Mary's and Washington—and was only knocked out of one game all year, when an Idaho player kicked him in the head 4 minutes into the 3rd quarter. He graduated from Oregon in 1949 with degrees in health and physical education.

Ecklund was a charter member of the Oregon Sports Hall of Fame. In 1999, he was inducted into the University of Oregon Athletics Hall of Fame and was named University of Oregon "Lineman of the Century".

== Professional career ==
He passed up a contract offer from the Green Bay Packers, choosing to join the upstart All-America Football Conference's New York Yankees for more money. He stayed with the team after the AAFC-NFL merger, through its sale and relocation to Dallas, then signed with the Baltimore Colts. In 1950 and 1951, he was named an All-Pro at center.

In 1953, Ecklund was named the most valuable offensive lineman of the Colts, an honor for which he received all of $100. Having achieved that career milestone, he quit the team and returned to Oregon to coach high school football.

== Coaching career ==
After his retirement, he began coaching in Oregon High Schools. In Gresham High School, his teams where in the state finals in 2 of his three years and were league champions in all three years. He then moved to Roseburg High School for one year, where his team was a runner-up to the league champions.

In 1958, Ecklund was hired as an assistant to the University of Oregon by Len Casanova. He jumped to the NFL in 1960, where Tom Landry hired him for the Dallas Cowboys inaugural season, becoming the first offensive line coach in franchise history.

He moved to the new Atlanta team in 1966, where he coached under his former Oregon teammate Norm Van Brocklin. He later coached at New Orleans, Philadelphia and Chicago.

In 1975, Ecklund was hired as an assistant coach for the Chicago Bears. In a personal note to Ecklund, team owner George S. Halas would later go on to praise his work by writing, "The Bears are again a fine defensive team. We owe you our thanks."

== Personal life ==
A member of the Screen Actors Guild, having earned a role in the movie North Dallas Forty, Ecklund also did some acting in TV commercials and appearances as John Wayne's look-alike while residing in Los Angeles.

Ecklund retired from coaching in 1979, and spent most of the rest of his working life as a substitute teacher in the Philadelphia area as well as the Southern California area, specifically in Orange, California, in 1981.

A resident of Vincentown in Southampton Township, New Jersey, Ecklund died on February 6, 2010, of congestive heart failure at a hospice in Mount Holly Township.
