= Sabin-Schellenberg Center =

Technical skills center in Oregon, United States

The Sabin-Schellenberg Center (SSC) is the technical skills center for the North Clackamas School District in Milwaukie, Oregon, United States. It encompasses a wide array of topics from cosmetology to information technology, manufacturing/engineering and automotive. The center is very active in SkillsUSA and sends a number of students each year to compete. It is also possible to earn I.T. certifications such as A+, CISCO, RHCE and others. The Sabin-Schellenberg Center also provides low cost services to the community using students in their various technical fields. Inexpensive catering, web design, bulk firewood and automotive repair can all be found at the SSC.

== Campuses ==
There are three campuses:

- North campus in Milwaukie at 45.420339°N 122.584122°W
- South campus in Milwaukie a few blocks from the north campus (at 45.418554°N 122.57909°W)
- Agricultural land lab in Clackamas at 45.415504°N 122.530748°W
