= Hog Island (Oregon) =

Island in Clackamas County, Oregon, United States

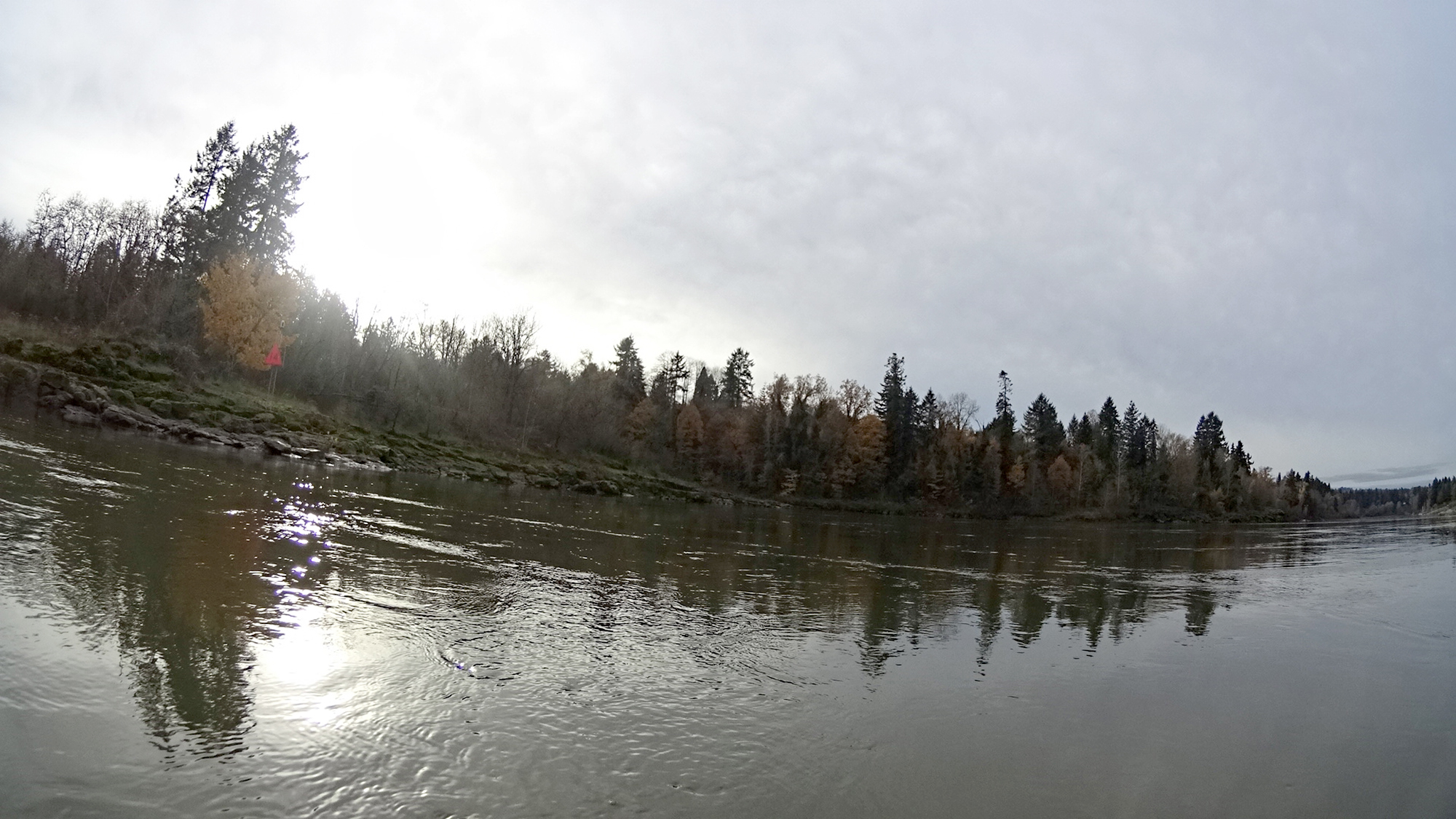
- A view of Hog Island
- Interactive map of Hog Island

Geography
- Coordinates: 45°24′4″N 122°38′35″W
- Adjacent to: Willamette River
- Area: 4 ha (9.9 acres)
- Highest elevation: 8 m (26 ft)

Administration
- United States
- State: Oregon
- County: Clackamas

Demographics
- Population: 0

Hog Island, also known as Oak Island, is an island in the Willamette River in Clackamas County, Oregon. It is located within the boundaries of the census-designated place of Oak Grove.

Hog Island is owned by Clackamas County and maintained by a nonprofit group known as Willamette Riverkeeper. It is accessible by boat. The island's native plants include Oregon White Oak, Douglas Fir, Oregon grape, Snowberry, and Camas.
