= Recovery Road =

2011 novel by Blake Nelson

- Author: Blake Nelson
- Language: English
- Genre: Young adult fiction
- Publisher: Scholastic Books
- Publication date: 2011
- Publication place: United States
- ISBN: 0-545-10729-6
- Preceded by: Destroy All Cars
- Followed by: Dream School

Recovery Road is a novel for teenagers by author Blake Nelson. The book is centered on a teenager, Maddie Graham, at the rehab center, Spring Meadows, and how she overcomes her addiction to alcohol and drugs. The book shows how Maddie transforms herself from a drug-obsessed and alcohol-addicted teen to a mature young woman who ends up going to university and developing a sober life.

Recovery Road was adapted into a TV drama of the same name, which debuted in 2016 on the Freeform network.

== Plot summary ==
Madeline (or Maddie) Graham is starting junior year in rehab. She hates the losers surrounding her, except fellow rehab friend, Trish. Soon, the two are escaping the halfway house every Tuesday to go to the movies with other recovering addicts. There, Madeline meets Stewart, another recovering addict, and the two teens are immediately drawn together. What follows is a story about being in love while trying to survive sobriety. Eventually, the two are released from rehab and must return to their previous lives; for Madeline that means returning to school and her old friends and routines. Her struggle to stay sober and find a new path is realistic and the strength of the story. Her relationship with Stewart, though, has the expected narrative ups and downs. When a tragedy strikes, Madeline is left to figure out what she really wants from life and how Stewart fits into her plans. Soon, Maddie discovers that she has lost so much in life because of drugs and she begins to take school more seriously. She graduates and gets into the University of Massachusetts, where she studies English and literature. Maddie cannot forget Stewart, but still decides to move on with her life and begins to date other boys, including a smart and handsome young man named Simon, whom she begins to like more and more. Then, about two years after she last saw Stewart, she finds him living on the streets as a junkie. She tries to help him, but he runs away, swearing at her and telling her to leave him alone. Finally, Maddie has to return to UMass. Maddie still keeps Stewart, her old Stewart, inside her heart and waits for him to come back to her one day.

== Awards ==
- YALSA Best Fiction for Young Adults 2011
- YALSA Quick Picks for Reluctant Young Adult Readers 2011
