= The Prince of Venice Beach =

2014 young adult novel by Blake Nelson

- Author: Blake Nelson
- Language: English
- Genre: Young adult fiction
- Publisher: Little, Brown
- Publication date: 2014
- Publication place: United States
- ISBN: 978-0-316-23048-3
- Preceded by: Dream School

The Prince of Venice Beach is a 2014 young adult novel by Blake Nelson.

== Plot summary ==
The book follows a seventeen-year-old runaway named Robert "Cali" Callahan who is hired to track down other runaway youth. What should be a simple assignment quickly becomes something more when he finds and falls in love with Reese Abernathy who is hiding from more than just her family.

The books takes place around Venice Beach California. A place known not only for its gritty skate and surf culture but also for its large population of homeless and runaway youth driven there by the warm weather.

== Published ==
The Prince of Venice Beach was published by the Hachette Book Group in June 2014.
