= Girl (Nelson novel) =

1994 novel by Blake Nelson

- First edition
- Author: Blake Nelson
- Language: English
- Genre: Drama
- Publisher: Touchstone Books
- Publication date: 1994
- Publication place: United States
- Media type: Paperback
- ISBN: 1-4169-4803-1

Girl is a 1994 novel written by Blake Nelson. The book chronicles teen girl Andrea Marr's exploration of the Northwest music scene at the height of the "grunge" revolution.

Girl was made into a film of the same name starring Dominique Swain, Portia de Rossi, and Selma Blair in 1998.

Portions of the novel first appeared in Sassy Magazine.

Two more installments are available of the GIRL series by Girl Noise Press.

== Plot summary ==
Andrea Marr begins high school as an ordinary suburban teen. When her friend Cybil starts a band, she becomes involved in the downtown music scene and comes across mysterious and charismatic musician Todd Sparrow. Todd is the lead singer of a local band called Color Green. This begins Andrea’s journey through the Pacific Northwest indie-rock world of the 1990s. In the process she breaks out of her suburban sheltered upbringing and finds herself, her sexuality, and experiences first lust in the year before she goes off to attend Wellington College.

== Publisher ==
This book was originally published by Touchstone/Simon & Schuster in September 1994. It was re-issued by Simon Pulse as a young adult title in 2007.

A sequel to Girl, Dream School, was published by Figment in 2011 and is available on Amazon Kindle.

The third installment of the Girl series, The City Wants You Alone, was published by GIRL NOISE press in September 2023. It is available as a paperback and e-book at www.girlnoise.net or wherever books are sold.

Girl is widely considered a contemporary classic and has recently been reissued for a third time by Simon Pulse (2017). The novel has been in print continuously for twenty-five years. Vanity Fair called GIRL: "A seminal coming of age text". It is also considered the best literary rendering of the 1990s subcultures Riot Grrrl and Grunge Rock.
