= Concord School (Oak Grove, Oregon) =

Historic building in Oak Grove, Oregon, U.S.

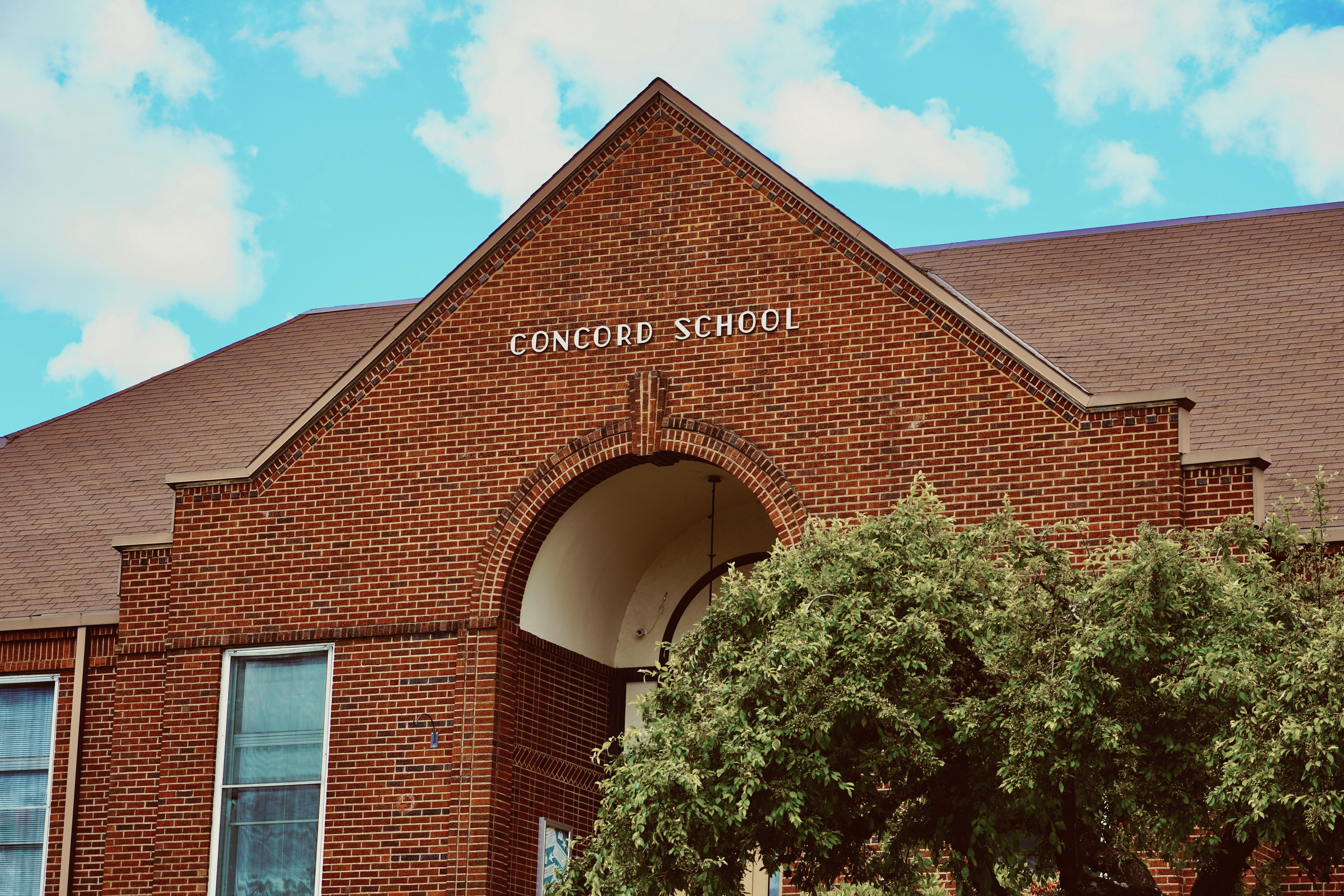
- Concord School in 2021

Location
- Oak Grove, Oregon; United States
- Coordinates: 45.4098388°N 122.6263013°W

Information
- Type: Historic building
- Founder: Works Progress Administration
- Closed: 2014

Concord School is a historic building and former school (Concord Elementary School) in Oak Grove, Oregon. The school was built by the Works Progress Administration and closed in 2014. Clackamas County has considered moving the Oak Lodge Library to the building. The building was named one of Oregon's Most Endangered Places by Restore Oregon. North Clackamas Parks and Recreation District took ownership of it in March 2018.
