= Kendrick Bourne =

American football player (born 1995)

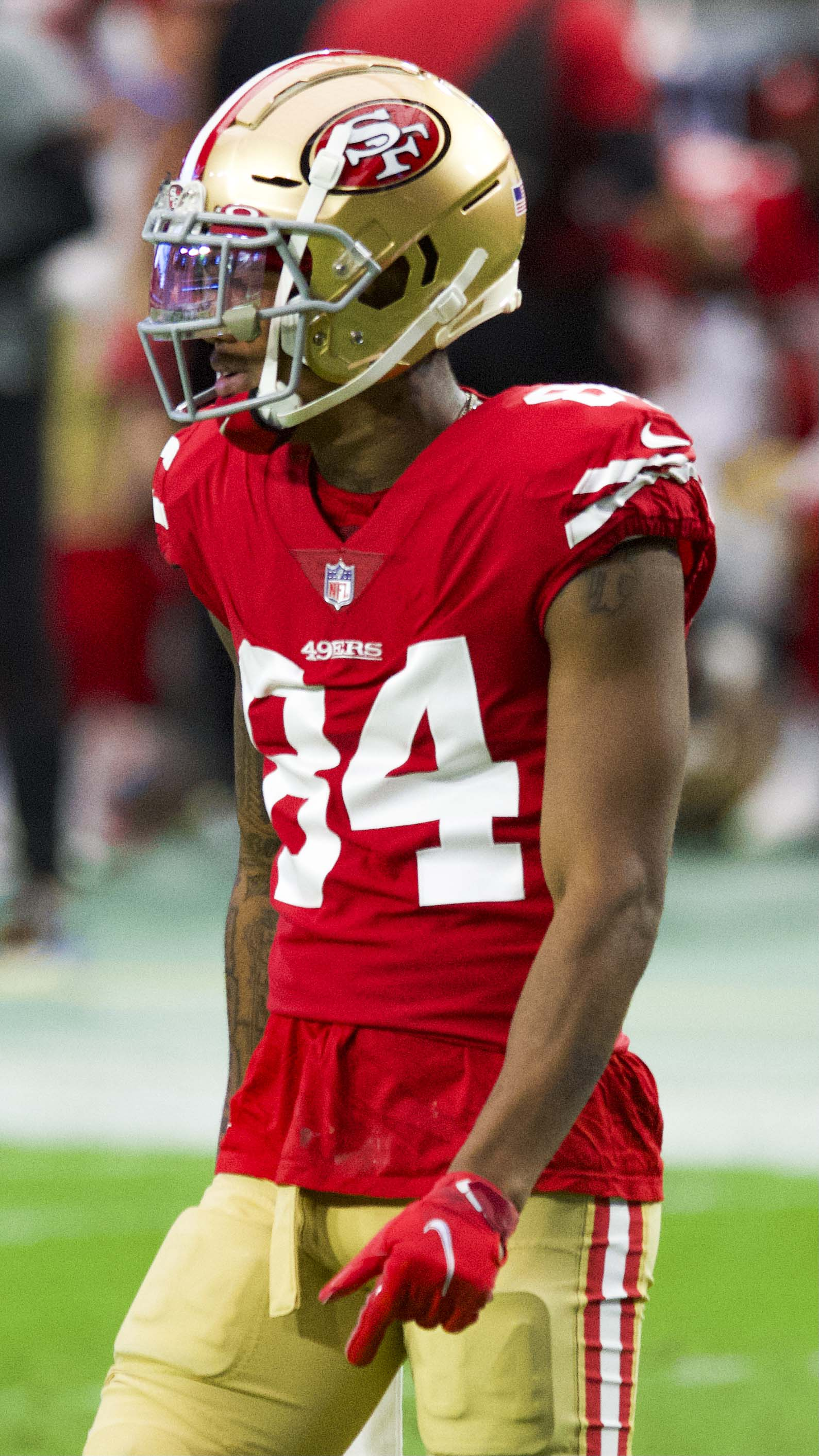
- Bourne with the San Francisco 49ers in 2020

No. 17 – Arizona Cardinals
- Position: Wide receiver
- Roster status: Injured reserve

Personal information
- Born: August 4, 1995 (age 31); Portland, Oregon, U.S.
- Listed height: 6 ft 1 in (1.85 m)
- Listed weight: 205 lb (93 kg)

Career information
- High school: Milwaukie Academy of the Arts (Milwaukie, Oregon)
- College: Eastern Washington (2013–2016)
- NFL draft: 2017: undrafted

Career history
- San Francisco 49ers (2017–2020); New England Patriots (2021–2024); San Francisco 49ers (2025); Arizona Cardinals (2026–present)

Awards and highlights
- Third-team All-American (2016); 2× Second-team All-Big Sky (2015–2016)

Career NFL statistics as of Week 5, 2026
- Receptions: 346
- Receiving yards: 4,443
- Receiving touchdowns: 22
- Stats at Pro Football Reference

Kendrick Bourne (born August 4, 1995) is an American professional football wide receiver for the Arizona Cardinals of the National Football League (NFL). He played college football for the Eastern Washington Eagles and signed with the San Francisco 49ers as an undrafted free agent in 2017. Bourne has also played for the New England Patriots.

== Early life ==
Bourne was born on August 4, 1995, in Portland, Oregon to an African-American father and a Samoan mother. He played high school football at the Milwaukie Academy of the Arts in Milwaukie, Oregon.

== College career ==
Bourne attended and played college football at Eastern Washington from 2013 to 2016.

== Professional career ==
Pre-draft measurables
Height	Weight	Arm length	Hand span	Wingspan	40-yard dash	10-yard split	20-yard split	20-yard shuttle	Three-cone drill	Vertical jump	Broad jump	Bench press
6 ft 1 1/8 in (1.86 m)	203 lb (92 kg)	32 1/2 in (0.83 m)	9 1/8 in (0.23 m)	6 ft 3 3/4 in (1.92 m)	4.55 s	1.56 s	2.63 s	4.21 s	6.73 s	36.0 in (0.91 m)	10 ft 5 in (3.18 m)	10 reps
All values from NFL Combine/Pro Day

=== San Francisco 49ers (first stint) ===
==== 2017 season ====
On April 30, 2017, the San Francisco 49ers signed Bourne to a three-year, $1.67 million contract as an undrafted free agent. The contract included $25,000 guaranteed and a signing bonus of $5,000.

Throughout training camp, Bourne competed for a roster spot as a backup wide receiver against Aldrick Robinson, Bruce Ellington, DeAndre Smelter, Aaron Burbridge, DeAndre Carter, B. J. Johnson, and Victor Bolden Jr. Head coach Kyle Shanahan named Bourne the fifth wide receiver on the depth chart to begin the regular season, behind Marquise Goodwin, Pierre Garçon, Aldrick Robinson, and Trent Taylor.

Bourne made his professional regular season debut during the season-opening 23–3 loss to the Carolina Panthers, but recorded no statistics. Bourne was inactive as a healthy scratch for the next five games (Weeks 2–6). During Week 9 against the Arizona Cardinals, Bourne caught his first NFL reception on a 25-yard pass by C. J. Beathard in the third quarter and finished the 20–10 loss with two receptions for 39 yards. During a narrow Week 15 25–23 victory over the Tennessee Titans, Bourne had a season-high four receptions for 85 yards.

Bourne finished his rookie year with 16 receptions for 257 yards in 11 games and no starts. Head coach Kyle Shanahan praised Bourne's improvement over his rookie year.

==== 2018 season ====
Bourne entered camp as a backup wide receiver and was named the fifth wide receiver on the depth chart to start the season, behind Pierre Garçon, Marquise Goodwin, Trent Taylor, and Dante Pettis.

During Week 2 against the Detroit Lions, Bourne caught his first NFL touchdown on a four-yard pass from quarterback Jimmy Garoppolo in the 30–27 victory. Two weeks later against the Los Angeles Chargers, Bourne had three receptions for 34 yards and a touchdown in the narrow 29–27 road loss.

During a Week 8 18–15 road loss to the Cardinals, Bourne made his first career start after Garçon aggravated a knee injury and finished with a season-high seven receptions for 71 yards. In the next game against the Oakland Raiders on Thursday Night Football, Bourne recorded two receptions for six yards and a touchdown in the 34–3 victory. During Week 16 against the Chicago Bears, he caught four passes for a season-high 73 yards in the 14–9 loss. In the regular season finale against the Los Angeles Rams, Bourne had five receptions for 59 yards and a touchdown during the 48–32 road loss.

Bourne finished his second professional season with 42 receptions for 487 yards and four touchdowns in 16 games and eight starts. He led the team's wide receivers in receiving yards and receptions.

==== 2019 season ====
During a Week 7 9–0 shutout road victory over the Washington Redskins, Bourne was the leading receiver with three receptions for 69 yards. Two weeks later against the Cardinals on Thursday Night Football, he caught his first touchdown of the season on a seven-yard pass from Jimmy Garoppolo in the 28–25 road victory. In the next game against the Seattle Seahawks on Monday Night Football, Bourne had four receptions for 42 yards and a touchdown during the 27–24 overtime loss.

During Week 11 against the Cardinals, Bourne recorded four receptions for 31 yards and a touchdown in the 36–26 victory. Three weeks later against the New Orleans Saints, he caught three passes for 18 yards and two touchdowns in the narrow 48–46 road victory.

Bourne finished the 2019 season with 30 receptions for 358 yards and five touchdowns in 16 games and no starts. His five touchdowns tied with George Kittle for the most touchdown receptions on the team. The 49ers finished atop the NFC West with a 13–3 record and earned the #1-seed in the playoffs. In the Divisional Round against the Minnesota Vikings, Bourne recorded three receptions for 40 yards and a touchdown during the 27–10 victory. During the NFC Championship Game against the Green Bay Packers, he had a six-yard reception in the 37–20 victory as the 49ers advanced to Super Bowl LIV. In the Super Bowl against the Kansas City Chiefs, Bourne caught two passes for 42 yards during the 31–20 loss.

==== 2020 season ====
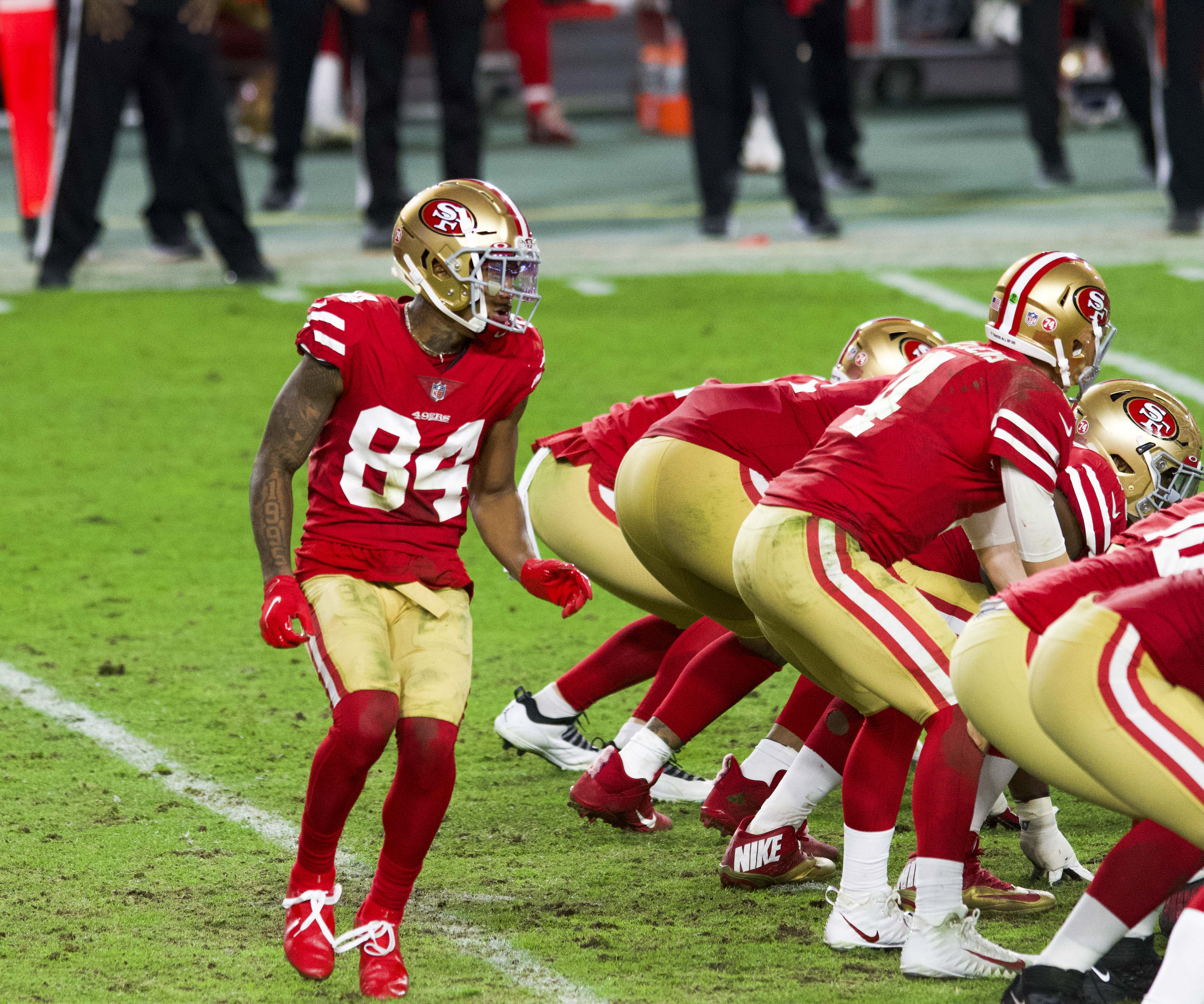
Bourne (left) in 2020

On April 6, 2020, Bourne was re-signed to a one-year, $3.259 million contract.

During Week 5 against the Miami Dolphins, Bourne caught two passes for 30 yards and his first touchdown of the season in the 43–17 loss. Bourne was placed on the reserve/COVID-19 list by the team on November 4, and was activated two days later. He was placed back on the list on November 9, and was activated again on four days later.

During a Week 15 41–33 road loss to the Dallas Cowboys, Bourne had four receptions for a season-high 86 yards and a touchdown. In the regular season finale against the Seahawks, he was the leading receiver with five receptions for 76 yards during the 26–23 loss.

Bourne finished the 2020 season with 49 receptions for 667 yards and two touchdowns in 15 games and five starts.

=== New England Patriots ===
==== 2021 season ====
On March 19, 2021, Bourne signed a three-year, $15 million contract with the New England Patriots.

Bourne made his Patriots debut in the season-opener against the Dolphins and finished the narrow 17–16 loss with a 17-yard reception. Two weeks later against the Saints, Bourne caught six passes for 96 yards and his first touchdown of the season from quarterback Mac Jones during the 28–13 loss.

During Week 6 against the Cowboys, Bourne recorded a 75-yard touchdown on his only reception of the 35–29 overtime loss. In the next game against the New York Jets, Bourne had four receptions for 68 yards and threw his first career touchdown on a 25-yard pass to Nelson Agholor during the 54–13 victory.

During a Week 10 45–7 victory over the Cleveland Browns, Bourne recorded four receptions for 98 yards and a touchdown to go along with three carries for 43 yards. Two weeks later against the Titans, he had five receptions for 61 yards and two touchdowns in the 36–13 victory. During Week 16 against the Jacksonville Jaguars, Bourne was the leading receiver with five receptions for 76 yards in the 50–10 victory.

Bourne finished the 2021 season with a career-high 55 receptions for 800 yards and five touchdowns to go along with 12 carries for 125 yards in 17 games and five starts. The Patriots finished second in the AFC East with a 10–7 record and qualified for the playoffs as the #6-seed. During the Wild Card Round against the Buffalo Bills, Bourne had seven receptions for 77 yards and two touchdowns to go along with a 14-yard carry in the 47–17 road loss.

==== 2022 season ====
Bourne entered the 2022 season third on the Patriots depth chart.

On December 5, Bourne garnered attention for criticizing team decisions and play-calling after a Week 13 24–10 loss to the Bills on Thursday Night Football. Three weeks later against the Cincinnati Bengals, he had six receptions for 100 yards and his only touchdown of the season to go along with a 29-yard carry in the 22–18 loss.

Bourne finished the 2022 season with 35 receptions for 434 yards and a touchdown to go along with six carries for 39 yards in 16 games and two starts.

==== 2023 season ====
During the season-opening 25–20 loss to the Philadelphia Eagles, Bourne caught six passes for 64 yards and two touchdowns. During Week 6 against the Raiders, he recorded season-highs with 10 receptions for 89 yards in the 21–17 road loss. In the next game against the Bills, Bourne had six receptions for 63 yards and a touchdown during the 29–25 victory. The following week against the Dolphins, he caught three passes for 36 yards and a touchdown before leaving the eventual 31–17 road loss with a torn ACL in the fourth quarter. Bourne was placed on injured reserve on October 31, 2023.

Bourne finished the 2023 season with 37 receptions for 406 yards and four touchdowns in eight games and five starts.

==== 2024 season ====
On March 21, 2024, Bourne signed a three-year, $33 million contract extension with the Patriots. He was placed on the reserve/PUP list to begin the season.

On October 5, Bourne was activated from the reserve/PUP list. The next day, he made his season debut against the Dolphins and finished the 15–10 loss with a six-yard reception. During a Week 11 28–22 loss to the Rams, Bourne recorded season-highs with five receptions for 70 yards and his only touchdown of the season.

Bourne finished the 2024 season with 28 receptions for 305 yards and a touchdown in 12 games and nine starts.

==== 2025 season ====
Although Bourne made the initial 53-man roster following roster cuts, he was released on August 27, 2025, per his request.

=== San Francisco 49ers (second stint) ===
On September 9, 2025, Bourne signed a one-year contract worth up to $5 million to reunite with his former team, the 49ers.

Bourne made his season debut in Week 2 against the Saints and finished the 26–21 road victory with three receptions for 32 yards. Three weeks later against the Rams on Thursday Night Football, Bourne was the leading receiver with 10 receptions for 142 yards in the 26–23 overtime road victory. In the next game against the Tampa Bay Buccaneers, he had five receptions for 142 yards during the 30–19 road loss.

Bourne finished the 2025 season with 37 receptions for 551 yards in 16 games and eight starts. The 49ers finished third in the NFC West with a 12–5 record and qualified for the playoffs as the #6-seed. He recorded no statistics in the postseason before the 49ers lost to the Seahawks in the Divisional Round.

=== Arizona Cardinals ===
On March 9, 2026, Bourne signed a two-year, $10 million contract worth up to $12 million with the Arizona Cardinals.

== Career statistics ==
=== NFL ===
Legend
**Bold**	Career high

==== Regular season ====
Year	Team	Games		Receiving					Rushing					Fumbles	
Year	Team	GP	GS	Rec	Yds	Avg	Lng	TD	Att	Yds	Avg	Lng	TD	Fum	Lost
2017	SF	11	0	16	257	**16.1**	54	0	0	0	0.0	0	0	0	0
2018	SF	16	8	42	487	11.6	33	4	0	0	0.0	0	0	1	0
2019	SF	16	0	30	358	11.9	30	**5**	0	0	0.0	0	0	0	0
2020	SF	15	5	49	667	13.6	49	2	0	0	0.0	0	0	0	0
2021	NE	**17**	5	**55**	**800**	14.6	**75T**	**5**	**12**	**125**	**10.4**	17	0	1	**1**
2022	NE	16	2	35	434	12.4	41	1	6	39	6.5	**29**	0	**2**	0
2023	NE	8	5	37	406	11.0	36	4	1	4	4.0	4	0	1	**1**
2024	NE	12	**9**	28	305	10.9	37	1	1	6	6.0	6	0	0	0
2025	SF	16	8	37	551	13.6	56	0	0	0	0.0	0	0	0	0
2026	ARI	5	2	17	178	10.5	23	0	0	0	0.0	0	0	0	0
Career		132	44	346	4,443	12.8	75T	22	20	174	8.7	29	0	5	2

==== Postseason ====
Year	Team	Games		Receiving					Rushing					Fumbles	
Year	Team	GP	GS	Rec	Yds	Avg	Lng	TD	Att	Yds	Avg	Lng	TD	Fum	Lost
2019	SF	**3**	0	6	**88**	**14.7**	21	1	0	0	0.0	0	0	0	0
2021	NE	1	**1**	**7**	77	11.1	**43**	**2**	**1**	**14**	**14.0**	**14**	0	0	0
2025	SF	2	0	0	0	0	0	0	0	0	0.0	0	0	0	0
Career		6	1	13	165	12.7	43	3	1	14	14.0	14	0	0	0

=== College ===
Season	Team	GP	Receiving		
Season	Team	GP	Rec	Yds	TD
2013	EWU	14	7	117	2
2014	EWU	14	52	814	10
2015	EWU	11	73	998	8
2016	EWU	14	79	1,201	7
College totals		53	211	3,130	27

== Music career ==
On January 9, 2025, the song "Red and Gold Timin'" by rapper Miles Minnick released, with Bourne performing the second verse of the song.
