= Clackamas Middle College =

Location
- 12021 SE 82nd Avenue (Clackamas County), Oregon 97086; United States; 45.436115°N 122.579482°W

Information
- Type: Public
- School district: North Clackamas School District
- Principal: Brian Sien
- Teaching staff: 6.82 (FTE)
- Grades: 9-12
- Enrollment: 297 (2018-19)
- Student to teacher ratio: 43.55 (FTE)
- Website: www.clackamasmiddlecollege.org

Clackamas Middle College (CMC) is a public charter school in Happy Valley, Oregon, United States.

== Academics ==
Clackamas Middle College is a public charter high school sponsored by North Clackamas School District.

Clackamas Middle College enrolls students from all over the Portland Metro Area.
