= Milwaukie Academy of the Arts =

Location
- 11300 SE 23rd Ave; Milwaukie, Clackamas County, Oregon 97222; United States; 45.441034°N 122.637806°W

Information
- Type: Public charter
- Opened: 2005
- School district: North Clackamas School District
- Director: Kim Kellogg
- Teaching staff: 0.83 (FTE)
- Grades: 9-12
- Enrollment: 323 (2023-2024)
- Student to teacher ratio: 389.16
- Colors: Purple and Yellow
- Athletics conference: OSAA
- Mascot: Mustang
- Website: Milwaukie Academy of the Arts

Milwaukie Academy of the Arts (MAA) is a public charter school in Milwaukie, Oregon, United States. It is located on the campus of Milwaukie High School. It is run by the North Clackamas School District.

== History ==
Milwaukie Academy of the Arts opened in 2005 and is primarily an alternative choice for students at Rowe Middle School to attend. Eighth graders from other schools can also apply to attend.

The school's curriculum promotes a more creative, hands-on approach to learning. Students from both Milwaukie high school and Milwaukie Academy of the Arts can participate in Visual and/or Performing Arts in the J.C. Lille Center for the Arts.The building features two visual art classrooms, one for traditional art and one for ceramics, a black box theatre, a dance room, choir room, band/orchestra room, and a 500-seat auditorium.

== Academics ==
In September 2025, US News ranked Milwaukie Academy of the Arts at number six of eight in NCSD. As of 2026, the school's reading proficiency was at 48% and it's math proficiency was at 27% according to the Oregon Department of Education. Its graduation rate is 78%.
