= Blake Nelson =

American writer

- Born: Chicago, Illinois
- Education: Wesleyan University; New York University; Jesuit High School (Portland)
- Writing career
- Notable works: Girl; Paranoid Park; Recovery Road

Blake Nelson is an American author of adult and children's literature. He grew up in Portland, Oregon, and attended Wesleyan University and New York University. He lives in Hillsboro, Oregon, in the Portland metropolitan area.

== Biography ==
Nelson began his career writing short humor pieces for Details magazine in the mid-'90s. These articles, with titles including "How to be an Expatriot" and "How to Live on $3600 a year", explored the slacker West Coast lifestyle.

His first novel Girl was excerpted in Sassy magazine in three successive issues. The mail Sassy received in response was key to the eventual publication of Girl. Girl has since been published in eight foreign countries and made into a film of the same name. The novel was reissued as a young adult novel by Simon & Schuster young adult imprint Simon Pulse in October 2007.

Nelson's novel Paranoid Park was made into a film of the same name by Gus Van Sant. The novel, about skateboarding teenagers, won the prestigious Grinzane Cavour Prize in Italy. The film won a special 60th Anniversary prize at the Cannes Film Festival in 2007.

A sequel to his first novel Girl, Dream School was released in December 2011 and follows the protagonist, Andrea Marr, to Wellington College, an eastern liberal-arts college modeled on Wesleyan, Nelson's alma mater. The Seattle Stranger called the Girl/Dream School series "The missing link between Bret Easton Ellis and Tao Lin."

Nelson's 2011 novel Recovery Road was adapted by Disney into a TV drama of the same name. It premiered in January 2016 on ABC Family (Freeform).

In 2023, Girl Noise Press published The City Wants You Alone, the third novel in the GIRL trilogy.

Blake Nelson has also contributed poetry, essays and non-fiction to The New York Times, The Quarterly (Gordon Lish), The San Francisco Chronicle, The New York Post and Conde Nast Traveler.

== Bibliography ==
- Girl, Simon & Schuster, 1994, (reissue 2007,2016)
- Exile, Scribners, 1997
- User, Versus Press, 2001
- The New Rules of High School, Penguin, 2003
- Rock Star Superstar, Penguin, 2005
- Prom Anonymous, Penguin, 2006
- Gender Blender, Random House, 2006
- Paranoid Park, Penguin, 2006
- They Came From Below, Tor Books, 2007
- Destroy All Cars, Scholastic Books, 2009
- Recovery Road, Scholastic Books, 2011
- Dream School (GIRL #2), Figment, 2011
- The Prince of Venice Beach, Little Brown, 2014
- Boy, Simon & Schuster, 2017
- Phoebe Will Destroy You, Simon & Schuster, 2019
- The City Wants You Alone (GIRL #3) Girl Noise Press 2023
