= Northwest Oregon Conference =

The Northwest Oregon Conference (NWOC) is a 5A level classification that falls under the Oregon School Activities Association or the OSAA. The conference was created in 2006 when the OSAA restructured its conference system, expanding from 4 levels to 6. Schools at the 5A level had previously competed at the 4A or 3A level.

== Members ==
- Canby High School - Canby
- Centennial High School - Gresham
- Hillsboro High School - Hillsboro
- Hood River Valley High School - Hood River
- La Salle High School - Milwaukie
- Milwaukie High School - Milwaukie
- Parkrose High School - Portland
- Rex Putnam High School - Milwaukie
- Wilsonville High School - Wilsonville
