= New Urban High School =

Location
- 1901 SE Oak Grove Blvd. Oak Grove, (Clackamas County), Oregon; United States; 45.417115°N 122.643406°W

Information
- Type: Public
- Established: 2003
- School district: North Clackamas School District
- Principal: Ariel Hammond
- Teaching staff: 16.76 (FTE)
- Grades: 9-12
- Enrollment: 254 (2023-2024)
- Student to teacher ratio: 15.16
- Colors: Purple, Red, and Copper
- Athletics conference: OSAA
- Mascot: Phoenix
- Website: New Urban High School

New Urban High School (NUHS) is a magnet high school located in Oak Grove, Oregon, United States. The school is designed to be an environment for high school students who aren't successful in traditional high school and need a smaller, more focused environment.

== Academics ==
In 2022, 100% of the school's seniors who have 24 credits received a high school diploma.
