= Paranoid Park (film) =

2007 American independent coming-of-age teen psychological drama film by Gus Van Sant

- Theatrical release poster
- Directed by: Gus Van Sant
- Screenplay by: Gus Van Sant
- Based on: Paranoid Park by Blake Nelson
- Produced by: David Cress; Neil Kopp
- Starring: Gabe Nevins; Taylor Momsen; Jake Miller; Daniel Liu; Lauren McKinney; Scott Patrick Green
- Cinematography: Christopher Doyle; Rain Kathy Li
- Edited by: Gus Van Sant
- Distributed by: mk2 diffusion (France); IFC Films (United States)
- Release dates: May 21, 2007 (Cannes Film Festival); October 24, 2007 (France); March 7, 2008 (United States)
- Running time: 84 minutes
- Countries: France; United States
- Language: English
- Budget: $3 million
- Box office: $4.5 million

Paranoid Park is a 2007 American independent coming-of-age teen psychological drama film written, directed and edited by Gus Van Sant. The film is based on the novel of the same name by Blake Nelson and takes place in Portland, Oregon. It is the story of a teenage skateboarder (played by Gabe Nevins) set against the backdrop of a police investigation into a mysterious death.

Van Sant wrote the draft script in two days after reading and deciding to adapt Nelson's novel. To cast the film's youths, Van Sant's casting director, Lana Veenker, posted an open casting call on social networking website MySpace inviting teenagers to audition for speaking roles, as well as experienced skateboarders to act as extras. Filming began in October 2006 and took place at various locations in and around Portland. Scenes at the fictional Eastside Skatepark were filmed at Burnside Skatepark which was, like Eastside, built illegally by skateboarders.

Paranoid Park premiered on May 21, at the 2007 Cannes Film Festival and was given a limited release on March 7, 2008. It grossed over US$4,481,000 from its $3 million budget. The film received critical acclaim; some critics praised the direction, Nevins' lead performance and cinematography in particular, though others believed the film to be overly stylized, senseless and slow-paced. It won one Independent Spirit Award, two Boston Society of Film Critics awards and the Cannes Film Festival's special 60th anniversary prize.

== Plot ==
Alex, a 16-year-old skateboarder, rides a freight train clandestinely with a man named Scratch whom he has just met at the Eastside Skatepark, known as "Paranoid Park". While the train is moving a security guard notices the pair, chases after them, and tries to get them off by hitting Scratch with his flashlight. During the melee, Alex hits him with his skateboard and the guard, losing balance, falls onto another track into the path of an oncoming freight train which cuts him in half. Alex tries to destroy some of the evidence: he throws his skateboard into the Willamette River from the Steel Bridge, and showers and disposes of the clothes he had been wearing.

Alex is later questioned at school by Detective Richard Lu, as are several other students who had been skateboarding on the night in question. It is revealed that the police have recovered Alex's skateboard, though they have not traced it back to him, and have identified DNA evidence which places the skateboard at the scene of the security guard's death.

Throughout the film, Alex keeps the incident to himself, and does not confide in anyone else. After having impassive sex with his girlfriend, Jennifer, he breaks up with her. Another of his friends, Macy, notices that he is worried about something. She advises him to write down whatever is bothering him as a cathartic release if nothing else. He initially rejects the idea, but eventually writes an account, which becomes the basis for the story. After completing the written account, Alex burns it.

== Cast ==
- Gabe Nevins as Alex
- Daniel Liu as Detective Richard Lu
- Jake Miller as Jared
- Taylor Momsen as Jennifer
- Lauren McKinney as Macy
- Scott Patrick Green as Scratch
- John Burrowes as Security Guard

== Production ==
Gus Van Sant chose to adapt American author Blake Nelson's novel Paranoid Park into a film of the same name because it was set in his hometown of Portland, Oregon, because he was an amateur skateboarder himself and because he found the story particularly interesting. At the time that he first read the novel, he was accumulating the finances for another film, but abandoned the project and decided instead to write a screenplay based on Nelson's story. His first draft of the script was written in two days, and the final draft was just 33 pages long.

Similar to his 2003 film Elephant, Van Sant sought non-professional young actors to play the main roles. Casting Director Lana Veenker created a page for the film on the social networking site MySpace. On the page, she posted an open casting call for males and females aged 14–18 who were "skaters, honor roll [students], cheerleaders, punks, drama kids, musicians, artists, student council [members], athletes, award winners, class skippers, photographers, band members, leaders, followers, shy kids, class clowns". Two audition sessions were held on August 3 and August 5, 2006, as well as an additional casting call for experienced skateboarders to act as extras in the film; a total of 2,971 people auditioned. Gabe Nevins, having never acted before, heard about the casting call from a skateboard store and originally auditioned as an extra. Nevins was cast in the lead role, which he says was based on his innocence that Van Sant believed trained actors to be lacking. Jake Miller, originally from Boise, Idaho, was on a road trip in Portland when he heard about the casting call and decided to audition with his friends. Taylor Momsen was a professional actor beforehand and received the Paranoid Park script through her agent. She won the role after sending her taped audition to Van Sant. The film features two cameo appearances: Alex's father is played by professional skateboarder Jay "Smay" Williamson, and his uncle is played by the film's cinematographer Christopher Doyle. Most of the actors wore their own clothes and wrote some of their characters' dialogue to maintain a sense of authenticity.

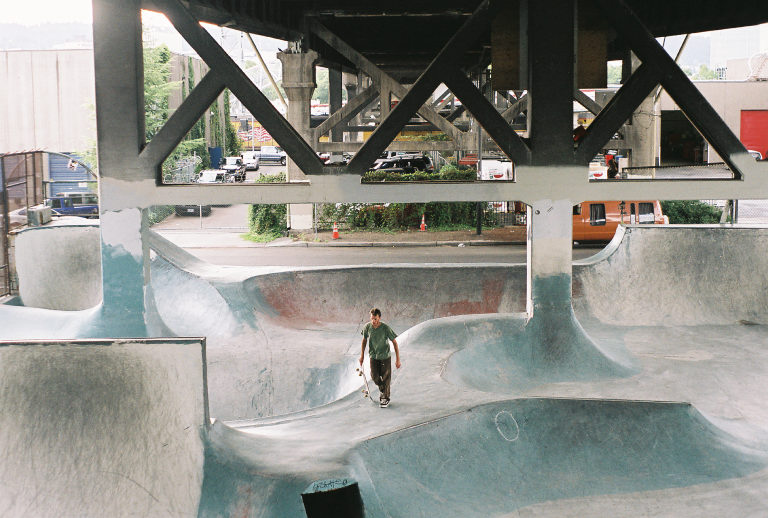
Portland's Burnside Skatepark, a filming location, was built clandestinely by skateboarders like the fictional Paranoid Park.

Principal photography began in Oregon in October 2006. Filming locations included Portland State University, the Steel Bridge, St. Johns Bridge, Lloyd Center, Madison High School and Van Sant's own beach house. Scenes at the fictional Eastside Skatepark were filmed at Portland's Burnside Skatepark, which was, like Eastside, built illegally by skateboarders and subsequently approved by the city as a public skatepark. Van Sant said that his request to film at Burnside was treated with some suspicion by the park's users, as "What none of them wanted was for us to portray a corny image of the park." Cinematographer Christopher Doyle shot parts of the film with a wide-angle lens that is used to shoot skate videos. The film's skateboarding sequences were shot on Super 8 mm film, a medium commonly used in skate videos, and the remainder of the film was shot on 35mm film, Van Sant's medium of choice.

== Distribution ==
=== Theatrical release ===
The world premiere of Paranoid Park was held on May 21, at the 2007 Cannes Film Festival. The film was subsequently screened at the Auckland International Film Festival, Edinburgh International Film Festival, Toronto International Film Festival, Athens Film Festival, Raindance Film Festival, New York Film Festival, Vienna International Film Festival and the Oslo Films from the South Festival before its theatrical release. Its international tour of the festival circuit continued after its U.S. release, and it was screened at the Rotterdam International Film Festival, Portland International Film Festival, London Lesbian and Gay Film Festival, Transilvania International Film Festival, Midnight Sun Film Festival and the Cinepur Choice Film Festival.

Paranoid Park was given a limited release in the United States on March 7, 2008. It grossed US$30,678 on its debut weekend, playing in two cinemas. The following week, it expanded to 22 locations and grossed $75,917 with a per-screen average of $3,451 and a total gross of $118,784. It earned another $90,403 from 36 locations in its third week with a per-screen average of $2,511 and a cumulative gross of $241,672. The film ended its theatrical run with a total domestic gross of $486,767 and a foreign gross of $3,994,693, giving a worldwide total of $4,481,460.

=== Home media ===
Paranoid Park was released on DVD in Canada on July 22, 2008, and in the United States on October 7, 2008. The disc includes trailers for The Last Winter and How to Rob a Bank which precede the film.

== Reception ==
=== Critical reception ===
Review aggregator website Rotten Tomatoes reported that 76% of 123 collected reviews for the film were positive, with an average score of 7/10. The site's consensus states "Director Gus Van Sant once again superbly captures the ins and outs of teenage life in Paranoid Park, a quietly devastating portrait of a young man living with guilt and anxiety." At Metacritic, which assigns a rating out of 100 to reviews from mainstream critics, the film received an average score of 84 based on 27 reviews, indicating "universal acclaim".

Manohla Dargis of The New York Times described Paranoid Park as "a haunting, voluptuously beautiful portrait of a teenage boy" and as "a modestly scaled triumph without a false or wasted moment". She praised Van Sant's direction, the cinematography and the overall realism of the film. The Los Angeles Times' Carina Chocano summarized the film as "a gorgeously stark, mesmerizingly elliptical story". She commended in particular the "dreamy camera work" and the "charged, simple direction". J. Hoberman wrote for The Village Voice that "Few directors have revisited their earliest concerns with such vigor [as Van Sant]." He concluded his review saying, "Paranoid Park is wonderfully lucid: It makes confusion something tangible and heartbreak the most natural thing in life." Todd McCarthy of Variety magazine wrote that "Through immaculate use of picture, sound and time, the director adds another panel to his series of pictures about disaffected, disconnected youth." He praised the "lovely" cinematography and the credibility of the female characters, though he felt that the soundtrack was sometimes distracting. Writing for New York magazine, David Edelstein opined that the film was "a supernaturally perfect fusion of Van Sant's current conceptual-art-project head-trip aesthetic and Blake Nelson's finely tuned first-person 'young adult' novel". He felt that Paranoid Park was different from Van Sant's previous "experimental" films in that "it works", though he criticized Nevins's "clinically inexpressive" acting. Rolling Stone's Peter Travers awarded the film 3.5 out of 4 stars and commented that the combination of the soundtrack with the "visual miracles" of the cinematography, "a defiant slap at slick Hollywood formula, is mesmerizing". In a review for The Hollywood Reporter, Kirk Honeycutt named the film "one of [Van Sant's] best movies yet".

Alternatively, William Arnold of the Seattle Post-Intelligencer graded the film as a C+ and described it as "a movie about its teen hero's inability to express his feelings: to himself, to his parents, to his friends and, unfortunately, to the audience". He criticized the "amateurish" cinematography, the "half-hearted attempts at mystery" and the "wooden" cast. Salon.com's Andrew O'Hehir wrote that Paranoid Park's "highly aestheticized and stylized depictions of teenage life sometimes seem as if they were shot through the wrong end of a telescope". He felt that the dialogue was "repetitious" and that teenage existence as portrayed in the film was less realistic than most Hollywood clichés. New York Press critic Armond White wrote that, in the film, "Van Sant reaches out to teen subculture, only to embalm its dissatisfaction in artiness" and found it to be "full of art-movie clichés". David Edwards, writing for The Daily Mirror, called the film "Dreary with a capital D" and "slow, melancholic, but mostly just plain weird".

=== Top ten lists ===
The film appeared on numerous critics' top ten lists of the best films of 2008:

- 3rd – J. Hoberman, The Village Voice
- 4th – V.A. Musetto, New York Post
- 5th – Liam Lacey, The Globe and Mail
- 5th – Scott Tobias, The A.V. Club
- 5th – Sheri Linden, The Hollywood Reporter
- 6th – Manohla Dargis, The New York Times
- 6th – Rene Rodriguez, The Miami Herald
- 8th – Noel Murray, The A.V. Club

=== Awards and nominations ===
Paranoid Park was nominated for two Independent Spirit Awards for Best Feature and the Piaget Producers Award (Neil Kopp, also for Old Joy), winning the latter. After its debut at the Cannes Film Festival, the film won the festival's special 60th anniversary prize and was nominated for the prestigious Palme d'Or. The film won two awards from the Boston Society of Film Critics for Best Director (Gus Van Sant, also for Milk) and Best Cinematography (Christopher Doyle and Rain Kathy Li). It was nominated for but did not win the Bodil Award for Best American Film awarded by the Danish Film Critics Association.

== Soundtrack ==
Paranoid Park: Original Soundtrack

Soundtrack album by Various Artists
- Released: October 15, 2007
- Length: 46:13
- Label: Uwe UK
- Producers: Tom Rothrock; Rob Schnapf; Elliott Smith

Most of the music choices came about during the editing process; Van Sant and the editors listened to each other's iTunes collections while working, and would use the songs they heard which they thought worked well. The film's soundscapes—described by Sam Adams of the Los Angeles Times as "a wash of foreign noise"—were mostly made by musician Ethan Rose and described by Van Sant as "very complicated". LA Weekly's Randall Roberts praised the soundtrack highly, writing, "It doesn't happen too often that a film's music will tweak my visual and sonic filter to such an extent that I actually perceive a whole class of people [skateboarders] in a new light, with more depth or empathy or whatever." The soundtrack was first released in France in October 2007, and in the United States in March 2008 to coincide with the film's release.

Track listing
No.	Title	Performer(s)	Length
1.	"Gradisca E il Principe"	Nino Rota	2:25
2.	"Angeles"	Elliott Smith	2:54
3.	"The White Lady Loves You More"	Elliott Smith	2:24
4.	"Il Giardino Delle Fate"	Nino Rota	2:13
5.	"I Can Help"	Billy Swan	4:00
6.	"Tunnelmouth Blues"	Henry Davies	3:10
7.	"Outlaw"	Cast King	4:08
8.	"Strongest Man in the World"	Menomena	5:37
9.	"I Heard That"	Cool Nutz	3:59
10.	"La Porticina Segreta"	Nino Rota	1:52
11.	"We Will Revolt"	José Ramires	1:58
12.	"L'Arcobaleno Per Giulietta"	Nino Rota	1:23
13.	"Symphony No. 9, 4."	Ludwig van Beethoven (composer)	3:20
14.	"Song One"	Ethan Rose	4:05
15.	"La Chambre Blanche"	Robert Normandeau	4:00
16.	"Walk Through (Resonant Landscape) No. 2"	Frances White	3:45
