= Oak Grove, Oregon =

Unincorporated community in the state of Oregon, United States

- Census-designated place (CDP)
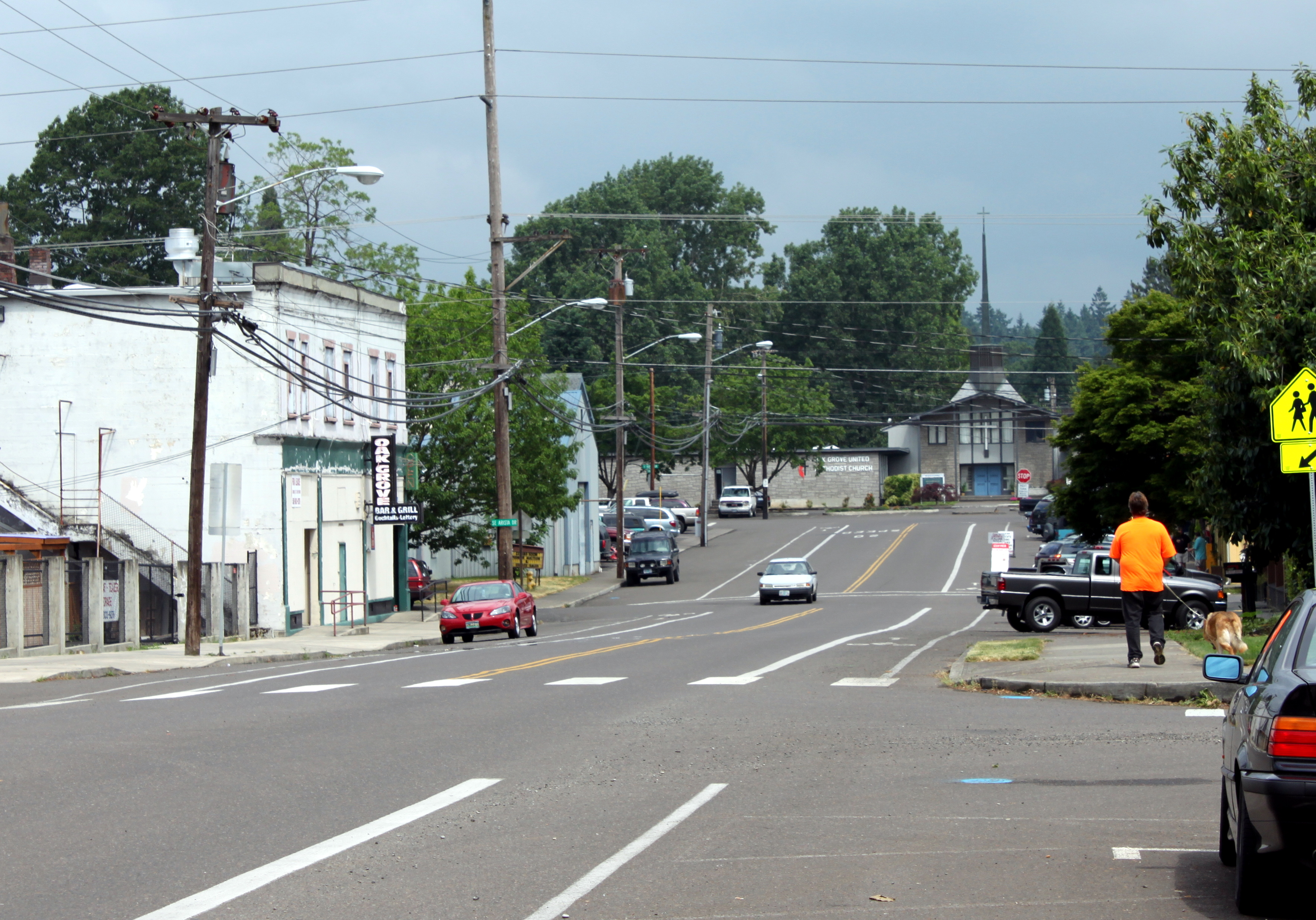
- View from main street (Oak Grove Boulevard) in Oak Grove

- Location of Oak Grove, Oregon
- Coordinates: 45°24′56″N 122°38′05″W
- Country: United States
- State: Oregon
- County: Clackamas

Area
  - Total: 4.17 sq mi (10.80 km^{2})
  - Land: 3.90 sq mi (10.11 km^{2})
  - Water: 0.27 sq mi (0.69 km^{2})
- Elevation: 200 ft (61 m)

Population (2020)
  - Total: 17,290
  - Density: 4,430/sq mi (1,710.3/km^{2})
- Time zone: UTC-8 (Pacific (PST))
  - Summer (DST): UTC-7 (PDT)
- ZIP codes: 97222, 97267, 97268
- Area codes: 503, 971
- FIPS code: 41-53900
- GNIS feature ID: 2408962

Oak Grove is an unincorporated community and census-designated place (CDP) in Clackamas County, Oregon, United States. The population was 17,290 as of the 2020 census.

== History ==
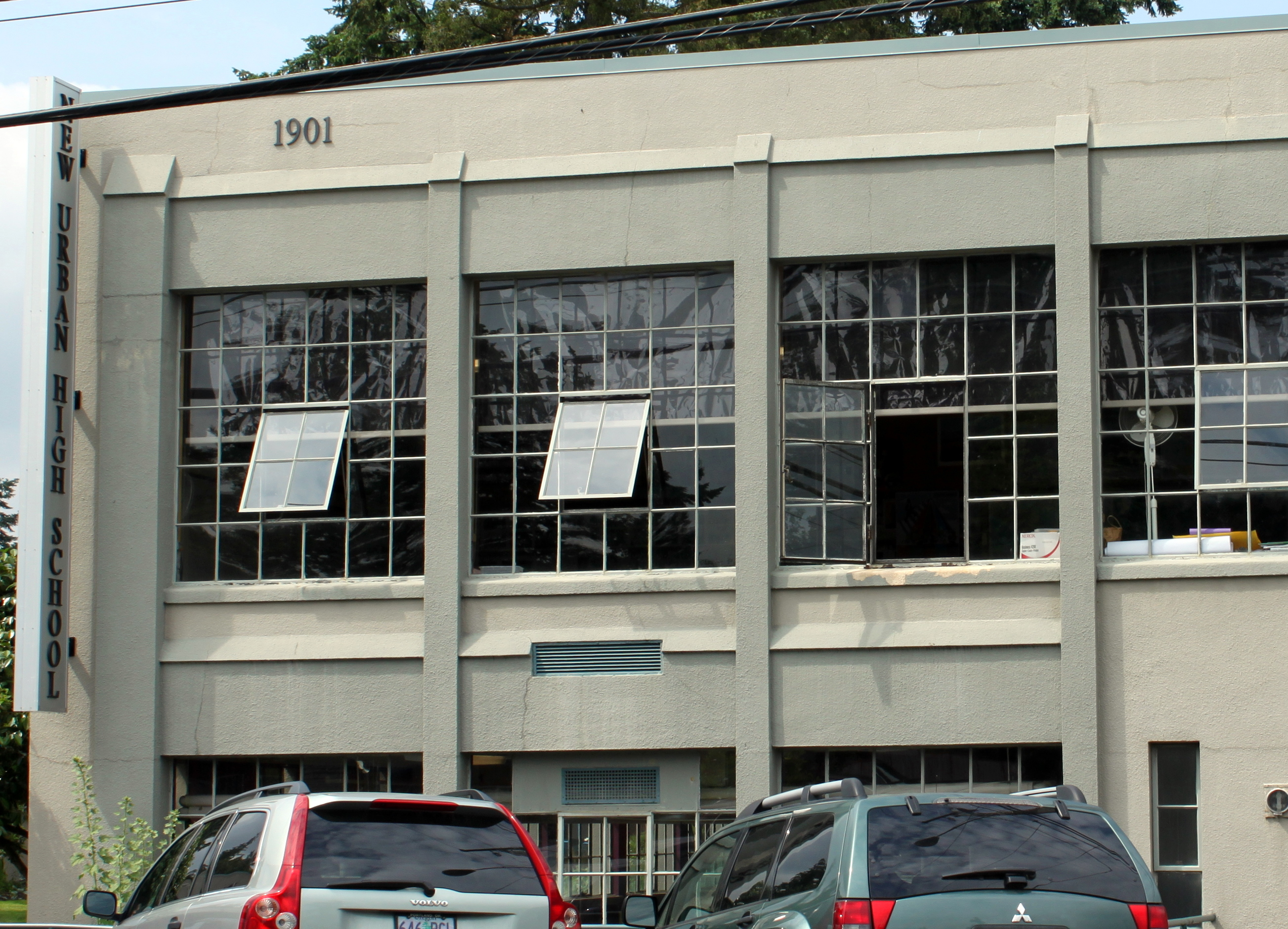
New Urban High School, 2009

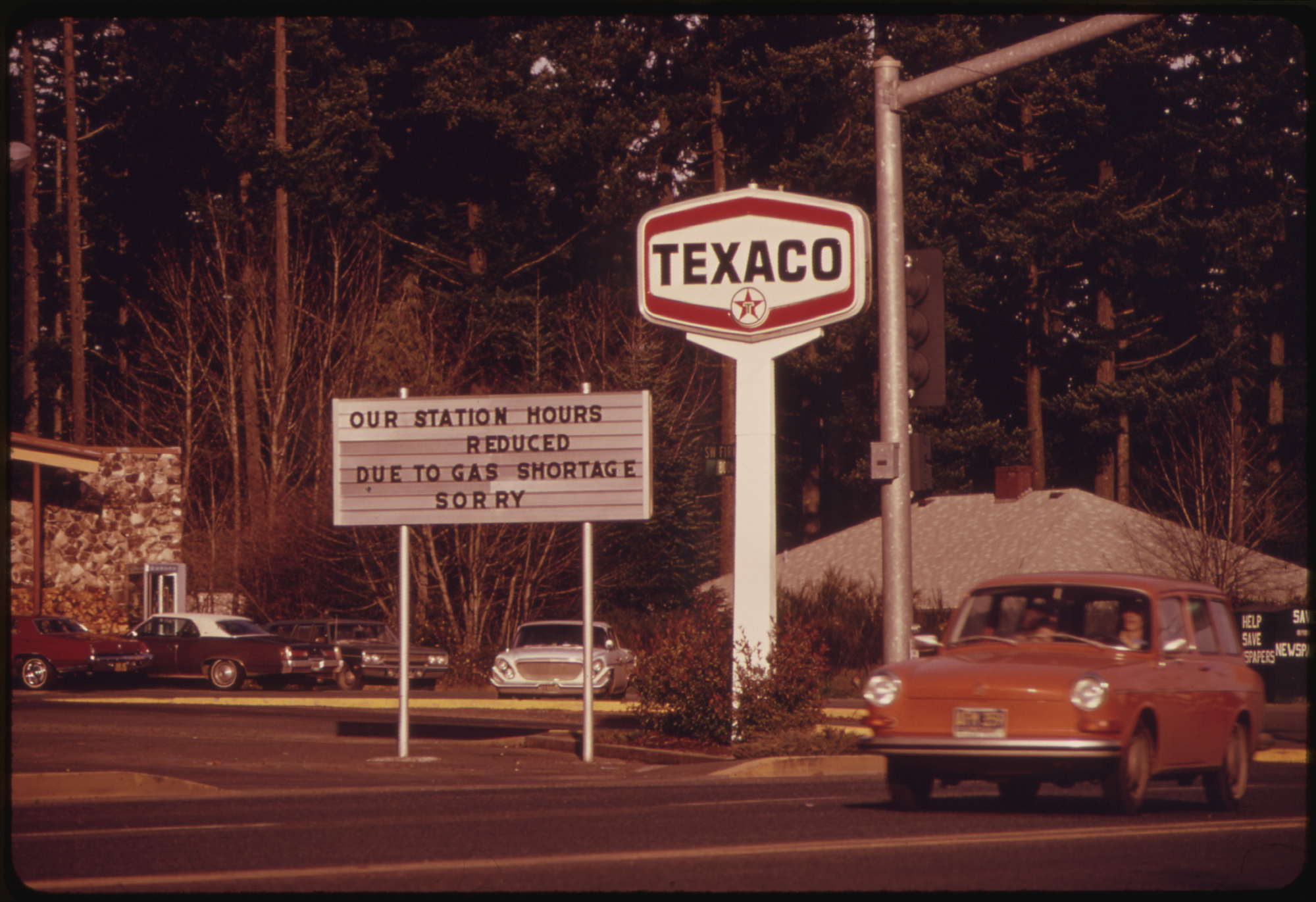
Sign during the 1973 oil crisis

Oak Grove was named at the suggestion of Edward W. Cornell, a member of the surveying party that platted the townsite in the 1890s. The company that was developing the property had not been able to come up with a good name for the place, and Cornell suggested "Oak Grove" after a crew ate lunch in a stand of oak trees in the northwestern part of the tract.

The area was served first from the Milwaukie post office. In 1904, Creighton post office was established, named for Susan Creighton, on whose donation land claim the office stood. Postal authorities did not name the office "Oak Grove" in order to avoid duplication. There had once been an Oak Grove post office in Josephine County. The first postmaster was noted Oregon botanist Thomas J. Howell.

Oak Grove railroad station was originally named "Center", and another station, St. Theresa, was originally named "Oak Grove". In order to prevent confusion, in 1907 the Post Office Department changed the name of the post office to "Oak Grove", and the Center railroad station was renamed to match. The railroad no longer passes through the community.

Concord School is a historic building and former school (Concord Elementary School) in Oak Grove.

Oak Grove is home to a LINCC library operated by Clackamas County.

== Geography ==
Oak Grove is located in northwestern Clackamas County, bordered to the north by the city of Milwaukie, to the east by unincorporated Oatfield, to the south by unincorporated Jennings Lodge, and to the west by the Willamette River, whose opposite shore hosts the cities of West Linn and Lake Oswego. Oregon Route 99E runs through Oak Grove as McLoughlin Boulevard; it leads north 8 miles (13 km) to downtown Portland and south 4 miles (6 km) to Oregon City.

According to the United States Census Bureau, the Oak Grove CDP has a total area of 4.1 square miles (10.7 km^{2}), of which 3.9 square miles (10.1 km^{2}) is land and 0.27 square miles (0.7 km^{2}), or 6.35%, is water.

Hog Island, an island in the Willamette River, is located within the boundaries of Oak Grove.

== Demographics ==
Historical population
Census	Pop.	Note	%±
2020	17,290		—
U.S. Decennial Census

=== 2020 census ===
As of the 2020 census, Oak Grove had a population of 17,290. The median age was 45.0 years. 16.6% of residents were under the age of 18 and 24.7% of residents were 65 years of age or older. For every 100 females there were 93.8 males, and for every 100 females age 18 and over there were 91.2 males age 18 and over.

100.0% of residents lived in urban areas, while 0.0% lived in rural areas.

There were 7,276 households in Oak Grove, of which 21.8% had children under the age of 18 living in them. Of all households, 43.9% were married-couple households, 19.3% were households with a male householder and no spouse or partner present, and 28.0% were households with a female householder and no spouse or partner present. About 29.9% of all households were made up of individuals and 16.1% had someone living alone who was 65 years of age or older.

There were 7,635 housing units, of which 4.7% were vacant. The homeowner vacancy rate was 0.9% and the rental vacancy rate was 5.4%.

Racial composition as of the 2020 census
Race	Number	Percent
White	14,032	81.2%
Black or African American	232	1.3%
American Indian and Alaska Native	163	0.9%
Asian	378	2.2%
Native Hawaiian and Other Pacific Islander	45	0.3%
Some other race	623	3.6%
Two or more races	1,817	10.5%
Hispanic or Latino (of any race)	1,700	9.8%

=== 2000 census ===
As of the census of 2000, there were 12,808 people, 5,641 households, and 3,249 families residing in the CDP. The population density was 4,379.6 inhabitants per square mile (1,691.0/km^{2}). There were 6,015 housing units at an average density of 2,056.8 per square mile (794.1/km^{2}). The racial makeup of the CDP was 91.47% White, 0.56% African American, 0.78% Native American, 1.79% Asian, 0.10% Pacific Islander, 2.55% from other races, and 2.75% from two or more races. Hispanic or Latino of any race were 5.89% of the population.

There were 5,641 households, out of which 24.7% had children under the age of 18 living with them, 43.9% were married couples living together, 9.9% had a female householder with no husband present, and 42.4% were non-families. 35.2% of all households were made up of individuals, and 18.8% had someone living alone who was 65 years of age or older. The average household size was 2.24 and the average family size was 2.89.

In the CDP, the population was spread out, with 21.5% under the age of 18, 7.5% from 18 to 24, 27.5% from 25 to 44, 23.3% from 45 to 64, and 20.2% who were 65 years of age or older. The median age was 40 years. For every 100 females, there were 89.0 males. For every 100 females age 18 and over, there were 85.8 males.

The median income for a household in the CDP was $40,530, and the median income for a family was $49,141. Males had a median income of $36,867 versus $29,877 for females. The per capita income for the CDP was $22,643. About 6.6% of families and 8.8% of the population were below the poverty line, including 14.1% of those under age 18 and 7.0% of those age 65 or over.

== See also ==
- Southeast Park Avenue station
