= Paranoid Park (novel) =

2006 novel by Blake Nelson

- Author: Blake Nelson
- Genre: Young adult novel
- Publisher: Viking
- Publication date: 2006
- Pages: 180
- ISBN: 978-0-670-06118-1
- OCLC: 64229860

Paranoid Park (2006) is a young adult novel by Blake Nelson.

== Plot ==
A 16-year-old skateboarder who tries to fit in with the skater crowd accidentally kills a security guard while trying to board a train. Much of the plot concerns the character struggling to cope with what he has done while also trying to avoid being caught. The author has said that the book is a retelling of Crime and Punishment in a young adult fiction setting. The novel takes place in Portland, Oregon, United States.

== Film adaptation ==
The novel has been adapted into a film by director Gus Van Sant, released in 2007, also called Paranoid Park.
