= Kellogg Creek =

- Location of the mouth of Kellogg Creek in Oregon

Location
- Country: United States
- State: Oregon
- County: Clackamas

Physical characteristics
- Source: near Lake Lenore
  - location: Johnson City
  - coordinates: 45°24′05″N 122°34′23″W
  - elevation: 185 ft (56 m)
- Mouth: Willamette River
  - location: Milwaukie
  - coordinates: 45°26′30″N 122°38′33″W
  - elevation: 10 ft (3.0 m)
- Length: 4.5 mi (7.2 km)
- Basin size: 15 sq mi (39 km^{2})

Kellogg Creek is a tributary, about 4.5 miles (7.2 km) long, of the Willamette River in the Portland metropolitan area of the U.S. state of Oregon. It begins near Lake Lenore in Johnson City and flows northwest to meet the river at Milwaukie. Kellogg Creek is joined about midway along its course by Mount Scott Creek, its major tributary, which enters the main stem near North Clackamas Central Park.

Mount Scott Creek and its tributaries, Phillips and Dean creeks, drain the western flanks of Mount Scott. Kellogg Creek empties into the Willamette River slightly upstream of the mouth of Johnson Creek. This is about 18.5 miles (29.8 km) above the Willamette's confluence with the Columbia River, which in turn flows about another 100 miles (160 km) to the Pacific Ocean at Astoria.

== Watershed ==
Most of the watershed lies inside Clackamas County Service District 1. All of Johnson City as well as parts of Milwaukie and the Oak Lodge Sanitary District are also in the basin. The total area covered by the watershed is about 15 square miles (39 km^{2}). Residential housing, commercial and industrial land such as the shopping mall at Clackamas Town Center, streets and highways such as Interstate 205, and pockets of high-density housing cover parts of the basin.

Several parks, wetlands, and natural areas are scattered about the basin. The upper main stem of Kellogg Creek begins in or near Hearthwood Wetland, a 16.2-acre (6.6 ha) preserve between Interstate 205 and Johnson City. Mount Scott Creek and two of its tributaries, Phillips and Dean creeks, flow through the 89-acre (36 ha) 3-Creeks Natural Area. Happy Valley Park, a 26-acre (11 ha) wetland, feeds Mount Scott Creek. The Minthorn Springs wetland of 6.52 acres (2.64 ha) in Milwaukie drains into lower Kellogg Creek. Mount Scott Creek also flows through Mount Talbert Nature Park and North Clackamas Central Park.

== Kellogg Dam ==
At the mouth of the river is Kellogg Dam, a 16-foot (4.9 m) high structure that creates Kellogg Lake behind it. The City of Milwaukie and its partners plan to remove the dam and do other work to restore runs of Coho and other salmonids that formerly frequented the Kellogg Creek watershed. Dam removal would open up 9 miles (14 km) along the creek and its tributaries for migratory fish. The plan calls for restoration of 14 acres (5.7 ha) of wetlands in the former lakebed. A new bridge over the creek near the mouth is to include bicycle lanes and pedestrian access along Oregon Highway 99E between Kronberg and Riverfront parks in Milwaukie.

In 2021, Milwaukie Mayor Mark Gambia said that, "Our kids and grandkids should grow up watching the salmon return every year. Removing Kellogg Dam is the biggest single thing we could do to make that a reality."

Neil Schulman, the executive director of North Clackamas Watersheds Council, in 2022, stated that "The process just got a big push forward, thanks to longtime river advocate, Sen. Jeff Merkley. He was able to secure $585,000 in Congressional funding for the next step of designing a free-flowing Kellogg Creek through the dam site…" As for when the actual dam removal might take place, Schulman said it could happen sometime between 2025 and 2028. "That may seem like a long way off, but keep in mind this is a major infrastructure project: removing a dam that has been in place since before Abraham Lincoln was president or Oregon was a state…"
