= Kellogg Creek Bridge =

Bridge in Milwaukie, Oregon, USA

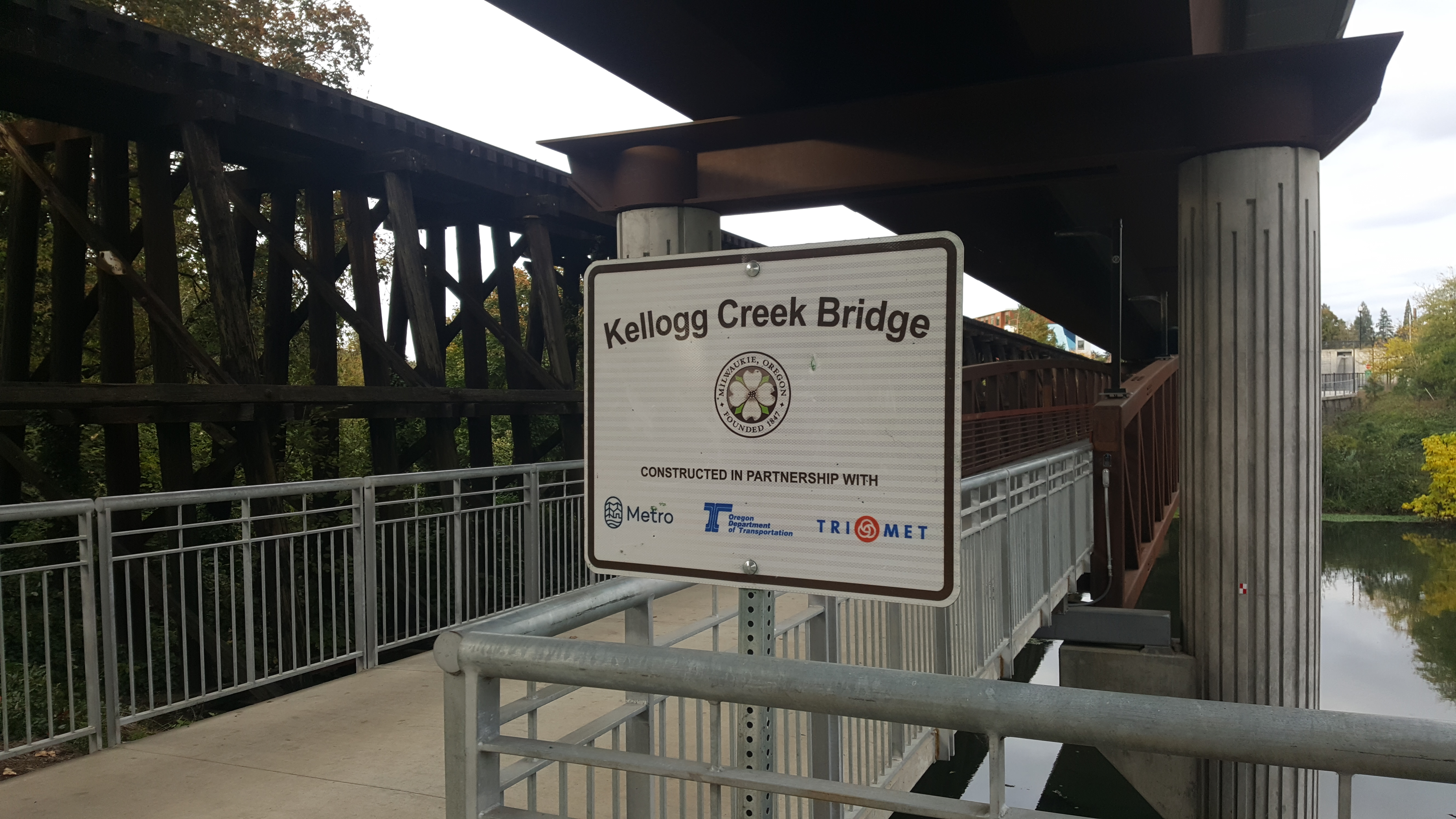
- Sign for the bridge, 2020
- Coordinates: 45°26′30.4″N 122°38′32.4″W
- Crosses: Kellogg Creek
- Locale: Milwaukie, Oregon, U.S.

The Kellogg Creek Bridge spans Kellogg Creek in Milwaukie, Oregon, United States.

== See also ==
- Kronberg Park
