= List of churches in the Roman Catholic Archdiocese of Portland in Oregon =

This is a list of current Roman Catholic churches in the Roman Catholic Archdiocese of Portland in Oregon. The archdiocese serves all 412,725 Catholics in Oregon, west of the Cascade Mountains. The cathedral church of the archdiocese is St. Mary's Cathedral of the Immaculate Conception.

== Cathedrals ==
Name	Image	Location	Description/notes
St. Mary's Cathedral of the Immaculate Conception		1716 NW Davis St, Portland	

== Monasteries ==
Name	Image	Location	Description/notes
National Sanctuary of our Sorrowful Mother (The Grotto)		3847 NE Glisan, Portland	Servite Order
Mount Angel Abbey		1 Abbey Dr, St Benedict	Benedictines, also university and seminary

== Parish Churches ==
Name	Image	Location	Description/notes
All Saints		3847 NE Glisan, Portland	Church dedicated January 20, 1918
All Souls		1242 NE Spruce Ave, Myrtle Creek	
Ascension		743 SE 76th Ave, Portland	First Mass on June 4, 1892
Church of the Korean Martyrs		10840 SE Powell Blvd, Portland	Korean language
Christ the King		11709 SE Fuller, Milwaukie	Church dedicated April 15, 1980
Good Shepherd		127 NE Hill St, Sheridan	
Holy Cross		5227 N. Bowdoin St, Portland	
Holy Family		7525 SE Cesar Chavez Blvd, Portland	
Holy Family Parish, Mission of All Souls		243 Marshall Ave, Glendale	
Holy Name		50 S Dean St, Coquille	
Holy Redeemer		2250 16th St, North Bend	
Holy Redeemer		25 N Rosa Parks Way, Portland	First Mass celebrated on September 16, 1906
Holy Rosary Chapel, Mission of St. Mary		7442 Crooked Finger Rd NE, Scotts Mills	
Holy Rosary Church and Priory		375 NE Clackamas St, Portland	Became a parish on February 15, 1908
Holy Trinity		355 Oregon Ave, Bandon	Church dedicated in 1883
Holy Trinity		13715 SW Walker Rd, Beaverton	
Holy Trinity		104 Blakely Ave., Brownsville	First Mass celebrated on Palm Sunday 1963
Immaculate Conception		1077 N Sixth Ave, Stayton	Church dedicated August 14, 1904
Immaculate Heart of Mary		2910 N Williams Ave, Portland	Parish founded in 1887
Nativity of the Mother of God Ukrainian Church		704 Aspen St, Springfield	Founded in 1979; Ukrainian language
Nativity of the Blessed Virgin Mary		315 E. Second St. "C", Rainier	Established in 1909
Our Lady of Fatima		56 Williams Lane, Shady Cove	
Our Lady of Guadalupe, Mission of Sacred Heart, Newport		231 E Logsden Rd, Siletz	
Our Lady of Lavang		5404 NE Alameda Dr, Portland	
Our Lady of Lourdes		39043 Jordan Rd, Scio	
Our Lady of Perpetual Help		1025 N. 19th St, Cottage Grove	
Our Lady of Sorrows		5239 SE Woodstock Blvd, Portland	First Mass celebrated on Christmas 1917
Our Lady of the Lake		650 A. Ave, Lake Oswego	
Our Lady of the Mountain		987 Hillview Dr., Ashland	Established 1890
Our Lady of the River (Grants Pass), Mission of St. Anne		3625 N. River Rd, Gold Hill	
Our Lady of Victory		120 Oceanway, Seaside	
Queen of Peace		4227 Lone Oak Road SE, Salem	
Resurrection		21060 SW Stafford Rd, Tualatin	Established 1981
Sacred Heart		3926 SE 11th Ave., Portland	
Sacred Heart		517 W. 10th, Medford	Church built in 1928
Sacred Heart		927 North Coast Hwy, Newport	
Sacred Heart		2411 Fifth St, Tillamook	
Sacred Heart-St. Louis		605 Seventh Street, Gervais	Established November 3, 1847
Saint Andre Bessette		601 W. Burnside St, Portland	
San Martin de Porres, Mission of St. John		407 Ferry Street, Dayton	
Shepherd of the Valley		600 Beebe Rd, Central Point	
St. Agatha		7983 SE 15th Ave, Portland	Founded in 1911; Also St. Agatha Catholic School
St. Agnes Parish, Mission of St. Luke		3052 D St, Hubbard	
St. Alexandra		170 N. 10th Ave, Cornelius	
St. Alice		1520 E Street, Springfield	Church dedicated December 10, 1922
St. Aloysius		3rd Ave. and NW Zobrist St, Estacada	Church blessed July 13, 1924
St. Andrew Dung-Lac, Mission of Our Lady of Lavang		7390 SW Grabhorn Road, Aloha	
St. Andrew		806 NE Alberta St, Portland	Church dedicated October of 1908
St. Anne		1015 SE 182nd. Ave, Portland	
St. Anne		1131 NE 10th St, Grants Pass	
St. Anthony		1660 Elm St, Forest Grove	Church dedicated August 27, 1911
St. Anthony		3720 SE 79th Ave, Portland	First Church September 8, 1918
St. Anthony		9905 SW McKenzie St, Tigard	
St. Anthony		685 Broadway, Waldport	
St. Augustine		1139 NW Hwy 101, Lincoln City	
St. Bernard		38810 Cherry St, Scio	
St. Birgitta		11820 NW St. Helens Road, Portland	
St. Boniface	Established 1879	375 SE Church St, Sublimity	
St. Catherine of Siena		25181 E. Broadway, Veneta	
St. Catherine of Siena Parish, Mission of Immaculate Conception Church		716 S. First Ave, Mill City	
St. Cecilia		5105 SW Franklin Ave, Beaverton	Founded 1913
St. Charles Borromeo Parish, Mission of Star of the Sea Parish		94323 Guantlett St, Gold Beach	
St. Charles		5310 NE 42nd Ave, Portland	
St. Clare		8535 SW 19th Ave, Portland	
St. Cyril		9205 SW Fifth St, Wilsonville	Church dedicated 1926
St. Edward		5303 River Rd. N, Keizer	
St. Edward		100 Main St, Lebanon	
St. Edward		10990 NW 313th Ave, North Plains	
St. Elizabeth Ann Seton		3145 SW 192nd, Aloha	
St. Elizabeth of Hungary		4112 SW Sixth Ave. Dr, Portland	
St. Francis de Sales Parish, Mission of St. Mary, Star of the Sea		867 Fifth Ave, Hammond	
St. Francis of Assisi		39135 NW Harrington Rd, Banks	
St. Francis of Assisi		15651 SW Oregon St, Sherwood	
St. Francis of Assisi		1131 SE Oak St, Portland	
St. Francis Xavier		323 N. Comstock Rd, Sutherlin	
St. Frederic		175 South 13th Street, St. Helens	
St. Helen		600 Fifth Ave, Sweet Home	
St. Helen		1350 W. Sixth Ave, Junction City,	
St. Henry		346 NW First Street, Gresham	
St. Henry Parish, Mission of St. Michael		38925 Dexter Rd, Dexter	
St. Ignatius		3400 SE 43rd St, Portland	
St. Irene Byzantine		4630 N. Maryland Ave, Portland	
St. James		1145 NE First St, McMinnville	
St. James		301 Frances St, Molalla	
St. John Fisher		4567 SW Nevada St, Portland	
St. John		445 N. Maple St, Yamhill	
St. John Parish, Mission of St. Michael the Archangel (Welches)		24905 Woodsey Way, Welches	
St. John the Apostle Parish (Oregon City)		417 Washington St, Oregon City	
St. John the Apostle Parish (Reedsport)		12 Saint John's Way, Reedsport	
St. John the Baptist		10955 SE 25th Ave, Milwaukie	
St. John the Baptist Parish, Mission of Holy Trinity Parish		1476 Oregon St, Port Orford	
St. John the Baptist Parish, Mission of Nativity of the Blessed Virgin Mary		100 SW High Street, Clatskanie	
St. Joseph		800 W. Stanton St, Roseburg	
St. Joseph's		721 Chemeketa St. NE, Salem	
St. Joseph Parish, Mission of Sacred Heart (Medford)		280 N. Fourth Street, Jacksonville	
St. Joseph Parish, Mission of Sacred Heart (Tillamook)		34560 Parkway Dr, Cloverdale	
St. Joseph the Worker		2310 SE 148th Ave, Portland	
St. Juan Diego		5995 NW 178th Ave, Portland	
St. Jude		4330 Willamette St, Eugene	
St. Mark		1760 Echo Hollow Rd, Eugene	
St. Mary by the Sea		275 S. Pacific St, Rockaway	
St. Mary Magdalene		3123 NE 24th Ave, Portland	
St. Mary		9168 Silver Falls Hwy, SE, Aumsville	
St. Mary		501 NW 25th St, Corvallis	Parish serving the Oregon State University Catholic Newman Center, as well as the city of Corvallis and Philomath.
St. Mary		1062 Charnelton St, Eugene	
St. Mary's		575 E. College St, Mt. Angel	
St. Mary		822 Ellsworth St. SW, Albany	
St. Mary		960 Missouri Ave, Vernonia	
St. Mary Parish, Our Lady of the Dunes		85060 Hwy 101 S, Florence	
St. Mary, Star of the Sea		1465 Grand Ave, Astoria	
St. Matthew		475 SE Third Ave, Hillsboro	
St. Michael		48520 Hebo Rd, Grand Ronde	
St. Michael		76387 Crestview St, Oakridge	
St. Michael the Archangel		1701 SW Fourth Ave, Portland	Portland State University Campus; Newman Catholic Campus Ministry.
St. Michael the Archangel Parish (Sandy)		18090 SE Langensand Rd, Sandy	
St. Monica		357 S. Sixth St, Coos Bay	
St. Patrick		1275 E. Street, Independence	
St. Patrick		498 NW Ninth Ave, Canby	
St. Patrick		1623 NW 19th Ave, Portland	
St. Patrick of the Forest Parish (Cave Junction), Mission of St. Anne		407 W. River St, Cave Junction	
St. Paul		1201 Satre Street, Eugene	
St. Paul		1410 Pine St, Silverton	
St. Paul		20217 Christie St. NE, St. Paul	
St. Peter		1150 Maxwell Rd, Eugene	
St. Peter		2315 N. Main St, Newberg	Church built in 1908
St. Peter		5905 SE 87th Ave, Portland	
St. Peter the Fisherman (Arch Cape), Mission of Our Lady of Victory		79441 Hwy 101, Arch Cape	
St. Philip Benizi		18211 S. Henrici Rd, Oregon City	
St. Philip Benizi Parish (Creswell), Mission of Our Lady of Perpetual Help		552 Holbrook Lane, Creswell	
St. Philip Neri		2408 SE 16th Ave, Portland	
St. Philip		825 SW Mill, Dallas	
St. Pius X		1280 NW Saltzman Rd, Portland	
St. Rita		10029 NE Prescott, Portland	
St. Rose of Lima		2727 NE 54th Ave, Portland	
St. Rose of Lima (Monroe)		470 S. Fifth St, Monroe	
St. Sharbel Church (Maronite Rite)		1804 SE 16th Ave, Portland	
St. Stanislaus		3916 N Interstate Ave, Portland	
St. Stephen		1112 SE 41st Ave, Portland	
St. Therese		1260 NE 132 Ave, Portland	
St. Thomas More		1850 Emerald, Eugene	Newman Catholic Campus Ministry
St. Thomas More		3525 SW Patton Rd, Portland	
St. Thomas Parish (Jefferson), Mission of St. Bernard		647 Third St, Jefferson	
St. Vincent De Paul		1010 Columbia St. NE, Salem	
St. Wenceslaus		51555 Old Portland Rd, Scappoose	
Star of the Sea		820 Old County Rd, Brookings	
Sts. Ann & Michael Parish, Mission of Holy Name		209 Second St, Myrtle Point	
The Community of Verboort, Oregon		4285 NW Visitation Rd, Verboort	
Visitation Catholic Church		4285 Visitation Rd, Forest Grove	

== See also ==
- Culture of Portland, Oregon
- Religion in Portland, Oregon
