= Vietnam War Memorial (Milwaukie, Oregon) =

War memorial in Milwaukie, Oregon, U.S.

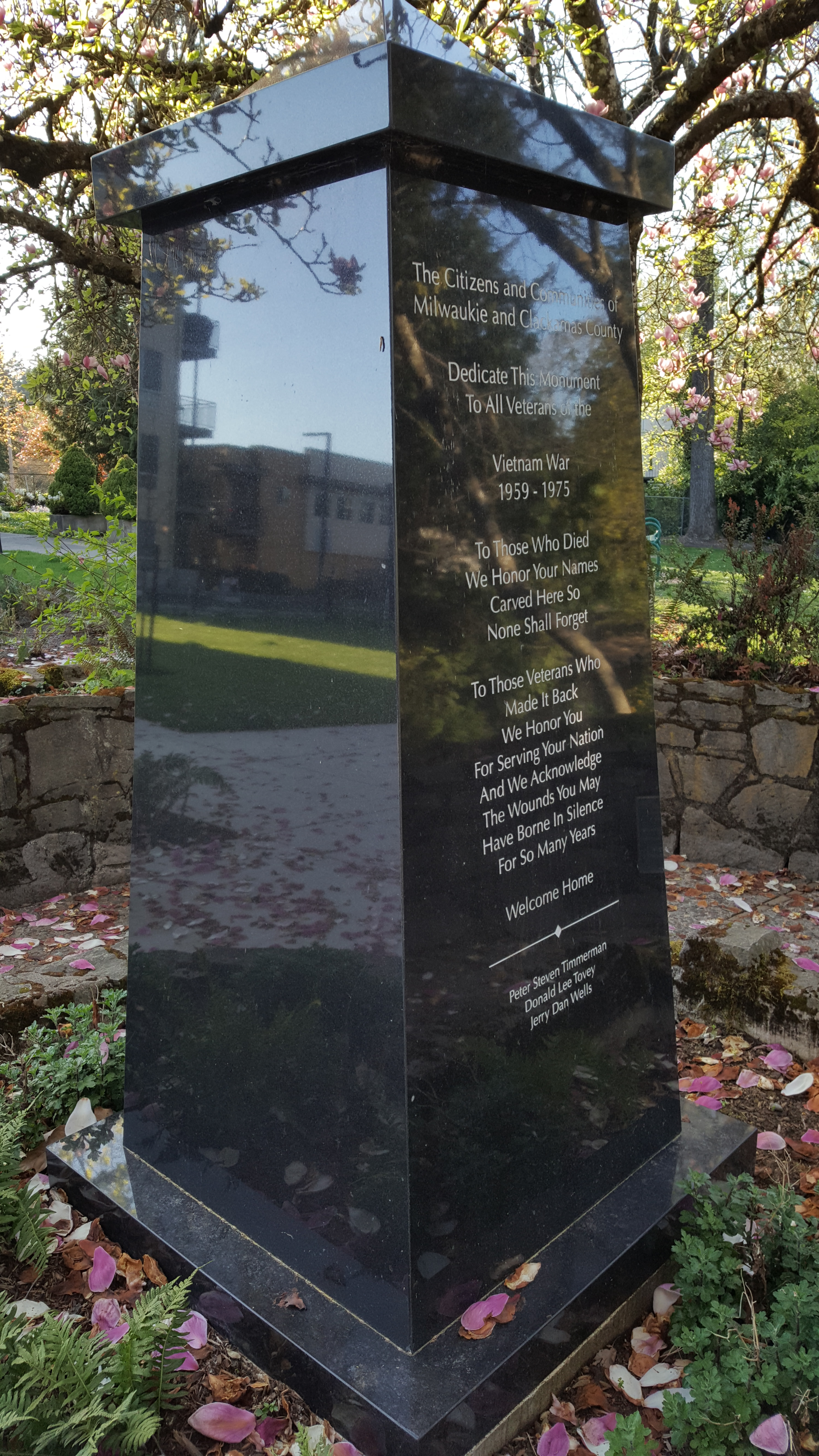
- The monument in 2020
- Interactive map of Vietnam War Memorial
- Location: Milwaukie, Oregon, U.S.
- Coordinates: 45°26′48.5″N 122°38′24.9″W
- Designer: Bruce Palone
- Dedicated date: November 11, 2017

The Vietnam War Memorial, also known as the Vietnam War Commemorative Monument, is a war memorial commemorating veterans of the Vietnam War in Clackamas County, installed in Milwaukie, Oregon's Scott Park, in the United States. The memorial was dedicated on November 11 (Veterans Day), 2017, and rededicated in 2020 following construction of the nearby Ledding Library. The obelisk was designed by sculptor Bruce Palone.

== See also ==
- List of Vietnam War monuments and memorials
