= Spring Park (Milwaukie, Oregon) =

Public park in Milwaukie, Oregon, U.S.

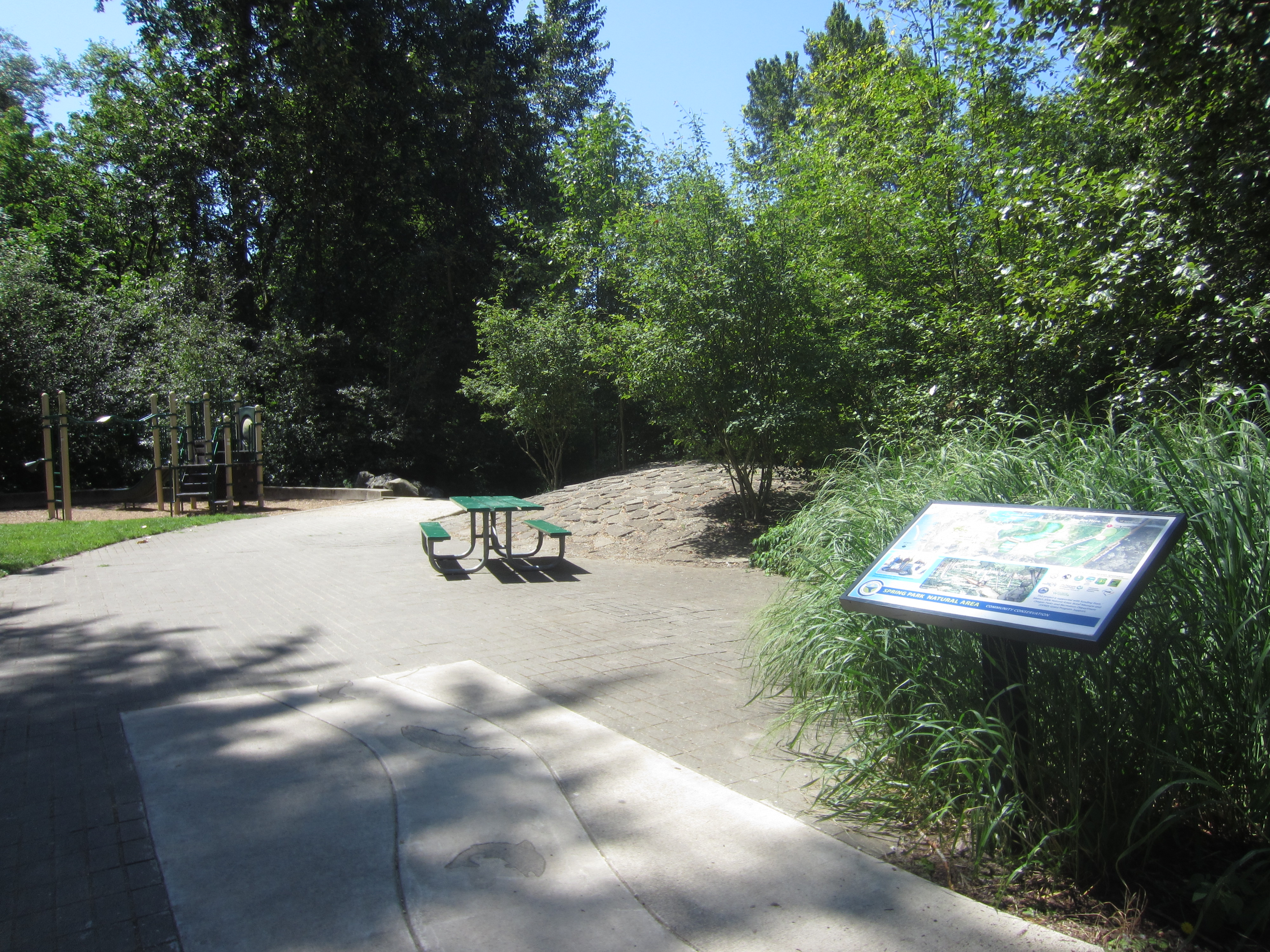
- Part of the park in 2019

- Location within Oregon
- Location: Milwaukie, Oregon, United States
- Coordinates: 45.433879°N 122.6461141°W

Spring Park, or Spring Park Natural Area, is a public park in Milwaukie, Oregon, United States. The park opened in 2015 after two decades of planning and construction, and provides access to Elk Rock Island. The boundaries of the park have been disputed with neighbors.
