= Ledding Library =

Public library in Milwaukie, Oregon, United States

Ledding Library of Milwaukie
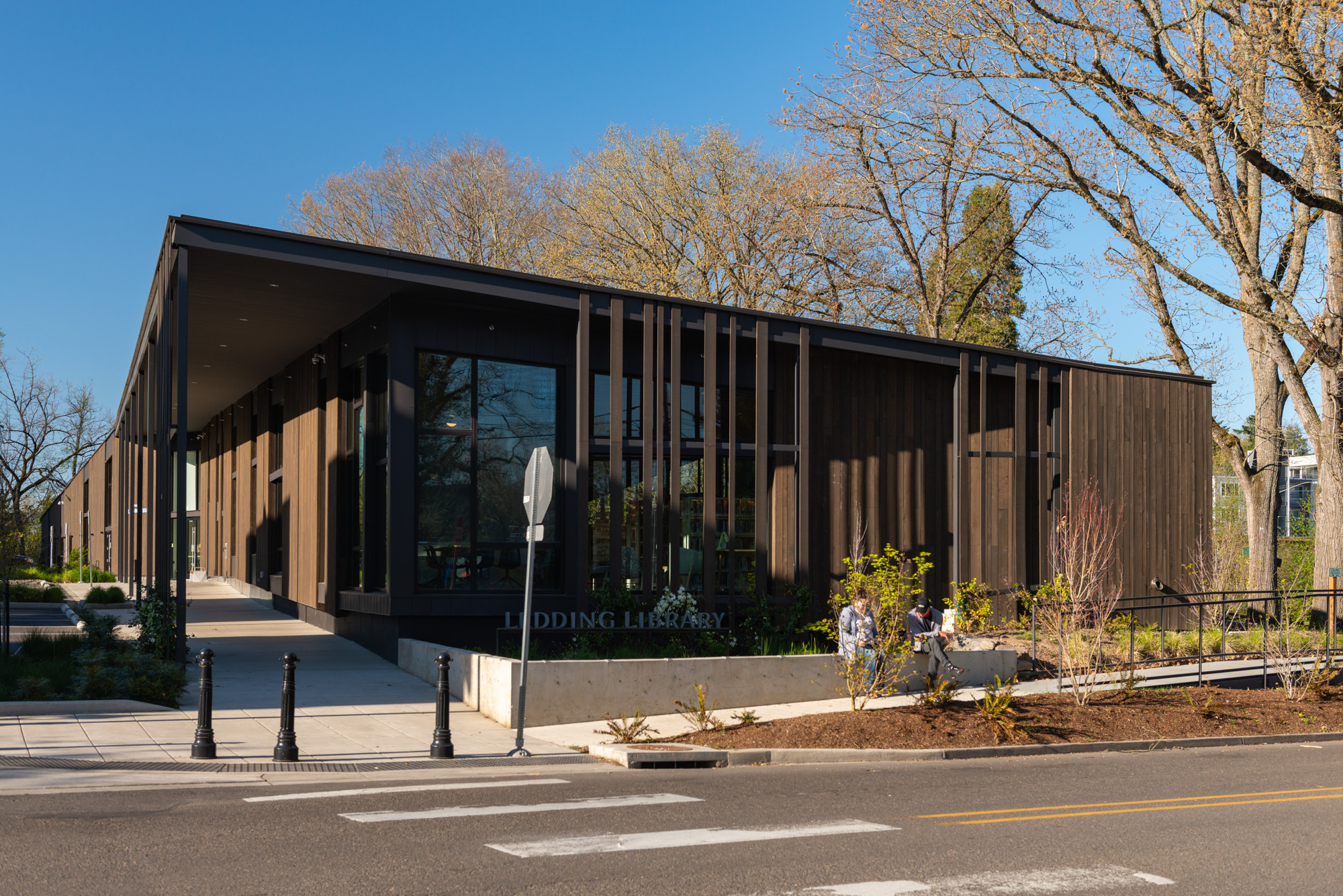
- The Library in 2021
- Interactive map of the Ledding Library of Milwaukie area

General information
- Location: Milwaukie, Oregon, 10660 S.E. 21st Ave., Milwaukie, Oregon, United States
- Coordinates: 45.446110°N 122.640782°W
- Opened: December 16, 1964
- Owner: The City of Milwaukie

Other information
- Parking: Small Lot

Website
- http://www.milwaukieoregon.gov/library/

The Ledding Library of Milwaukie (also known as the Milwaukie Library) is the city-operated public library of Milwaukie, Oregon. The library offers the public with over three million books, periodicals, and other materials. It is a member of the county-wide Library Information Network of Clackamas County (LINCC) system. As of 2023, the library was the third busiest in the county in terms of material circulations.

It is located adjacent to the Vietnam War Memorial and Scott Park.

== History ==
=== Early libraries ===
In 1889, Alfred Lewelling, a relative of Seth Lewelling, started a small library located inside the office of the Justice of the Peace, Thomas Lakin. The building burned down just a few months after the library was founded.

In 1910, the City Council appointed a committee to establish a library in the old City Hall. The books from this library were donated to the new grammar school in 1916 upon its completion. The State Library of Oregon provided materials for various pop-up libraries in local homes until 1926, when an official library was opened inside the local Perry Pharmacy, also circulating books from the State Library. In 1934, Wilbur D. Rowe created a plan to move the library into City Hall, and Dorothy M. Winters was appointed to be the first official librarian. A Library Board was created in 1936.

=== First Ledding Library ===
In 1961, local attorney Florence Olsen Ledding indicated in her will that her property was to be permanently used as a free public library, to be named the Ledding Library after herself and her husband Herman. This gift along with a $150,000 bond measure allowed the city to start and maintain the library. Ledding was known for being one of the first female attorneys in Oregon.

In 1964, a newer 11,800 square foot library was built on her property. This library had 2 levels: the main floor, and the basement, called "Wilbur D. Rowe Children's Library". The building was dedicated on Dec. 16, 1964, and had 11,800 square feet of floor space total. The building was expanded in 1987.

=== New Ledding Library ===
In May 2016, Milwaukie residents passed a bond that would improve and expand the Ledding Library. In 2018, a rebuilding project broke ground which called for the demolition of the old library and a new 18,000 square-foot building to replace it. The new library opened on January 7, 2020 with a ribbon-cutting ceremony held on January 11. The new library contains a community room, conference room, and 2 study rooms, all available for free to the public.

During the reconstruction, the library operated out a temporary location set up in a TriMet park-and-ride.

== Services ==
The library maintains a library of things collection and a seed library.

== See also ==
- List of libraries in Oregon
- Vietnam War Memorial (Milwaukie, Oregon)
