= Davis Graveyard =

Annual Halloween display in Milwaukie, Oregon, U.S.

- The display in 2026
- Status: Active
- Genre: Halloween
- Frequency: Annually
- Location: Milwaukie, Oregon
- Coordinates: 45.4597°N 122.6188°W
- Country: United States
- Inaugurated: 1998
- Founders: Jeff Davis; Chris Davis
- Attendance: Thousands
- Website: davisgraveyard.com

Davis Graveyard is an annual Halloween yard display at a private residence in Milwaukie, Oregon, United States.

== Description ==
Davis Graveyard is displayed at a private residence each year for Halloween. The display includes "eerie lights, spooky sounds, and horrifying headstones", often commemorating celebrities who died recently. Thousands visit the attraction annually. In 2018, Sam Pape and Chris Davis of Portland Monthly called the graveyard a "creepy-wonderful, nationally known destination". The display is viewed from behind a fence; there is no admission fee.

== History ==
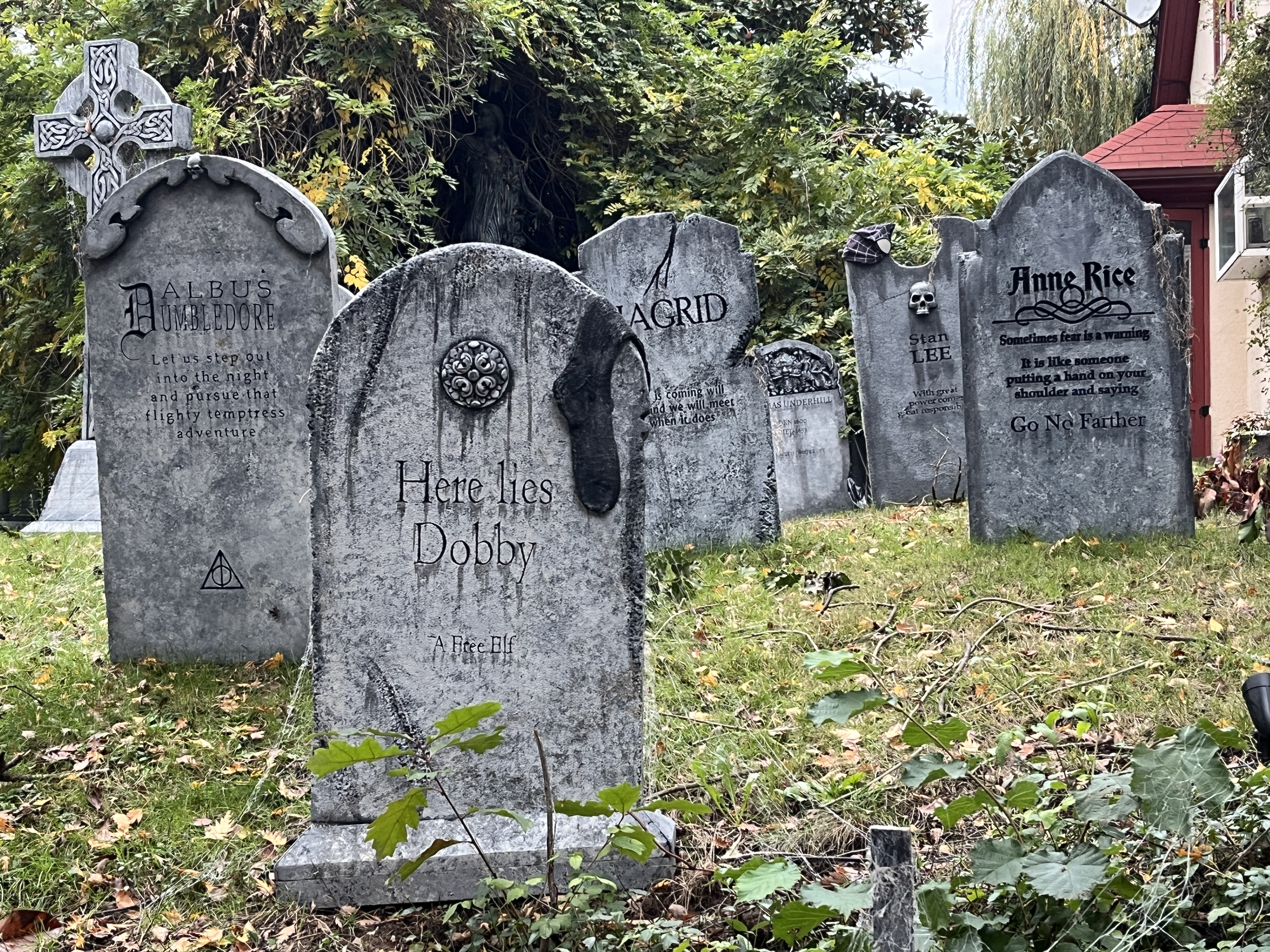
Gravestones in 2024

Jeff and Chris Davis have created the graveyard since 1998. The duo have received grants from Clackamas County Arts and the Milwaukie Tourism Board to fund the project. In addition to the yard display, they have hosted summer workshops on creating faux crypts. In 2018, the display had 75 tombstones, an animatronic gravedigger, a projection screen crypt, and a 29-foot (8.8 m) gothic cathedral made from polystyrene foam. The cathedral covered a garage used as a workshop for making gravestones and figures out of drywall mud, foam, and latex paint.

The graveyard was not displayed in 2020 because of the COVID-19 pandemic. However, some of its features were displayed at the Clackamas County Scare Fair, a drive-through attraction.

== Reception ==
In 2018, The Oregonian's Samantha Swindler described the attraction as "probably the largest and most well-known home haunt in the Portland area". According to KPTV, the display "has been voted one of the best home Halloween displays in the world". Gabbi Shaw selected the display to represent Oregon in Business Insider's list of "the best way to celebrate Halloween in every state".
