= Elk Rock Island =

Island in the Willamette River in the U.S. state of Oregon

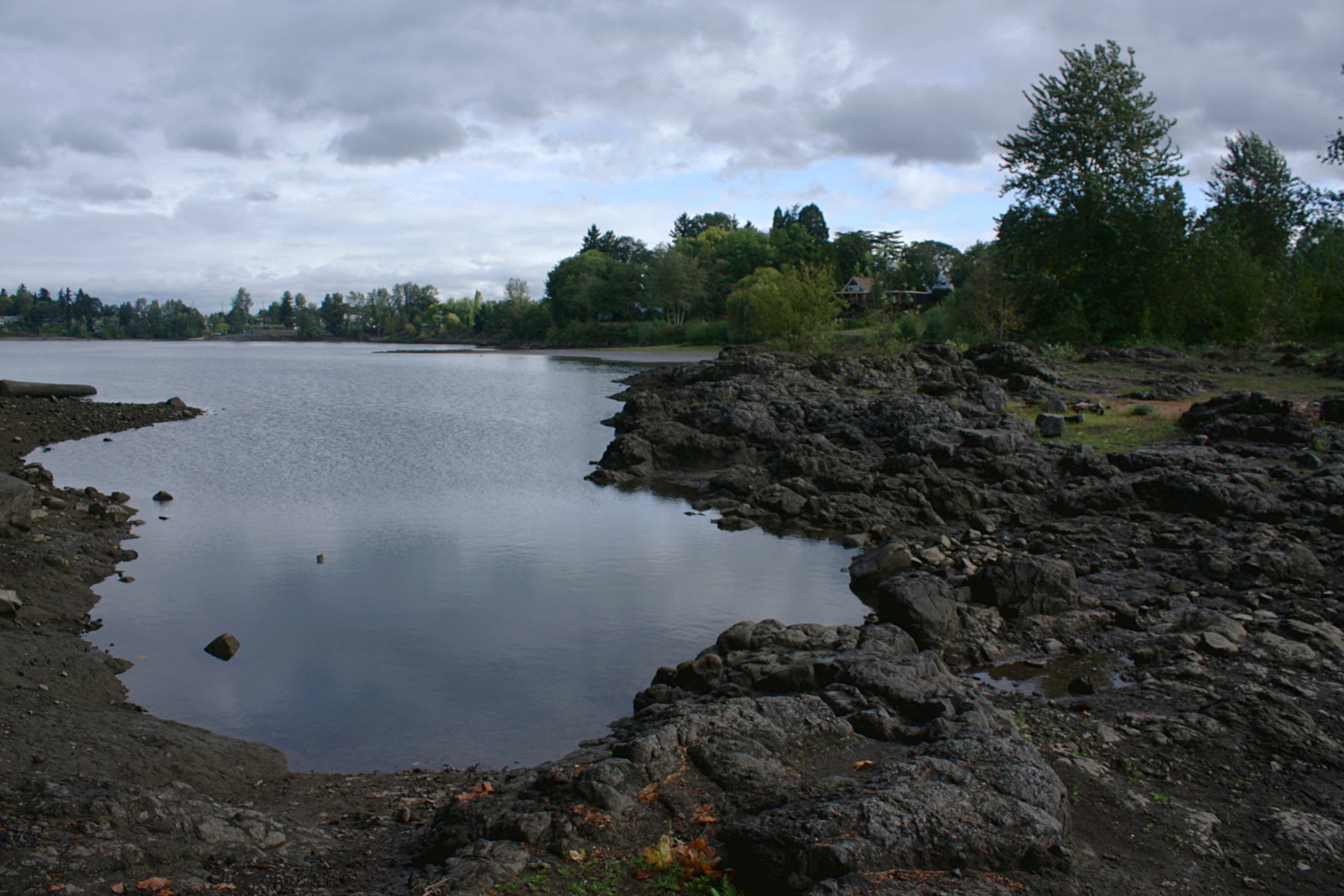
- The island in 2008
- Interactive map of Elk Rock Island
- Location: Milwaukie, Oregon, U.S.
- Coordinates: 45.436°N 122.648°W
- Created: 1955

Elk Rock Island is an island on the Willamette River in the U.S. state of Oregon. The 12- to 13-acre (4.9- to 5.3-ha) island, formed 40 million years ago by a volcano, was given to Portland by Peter Kerr in 1940. The city of Milwaukie took ownership of the park in April 2016. The island is accessible via Spring Park.

== Ecology ==
The island contains deciduous forest, mixed evergreen-deciduous forest and perennial graminoid vegetation. It is one of the last stands of the Oregon White Oak.
