= Portland Waldorf School =

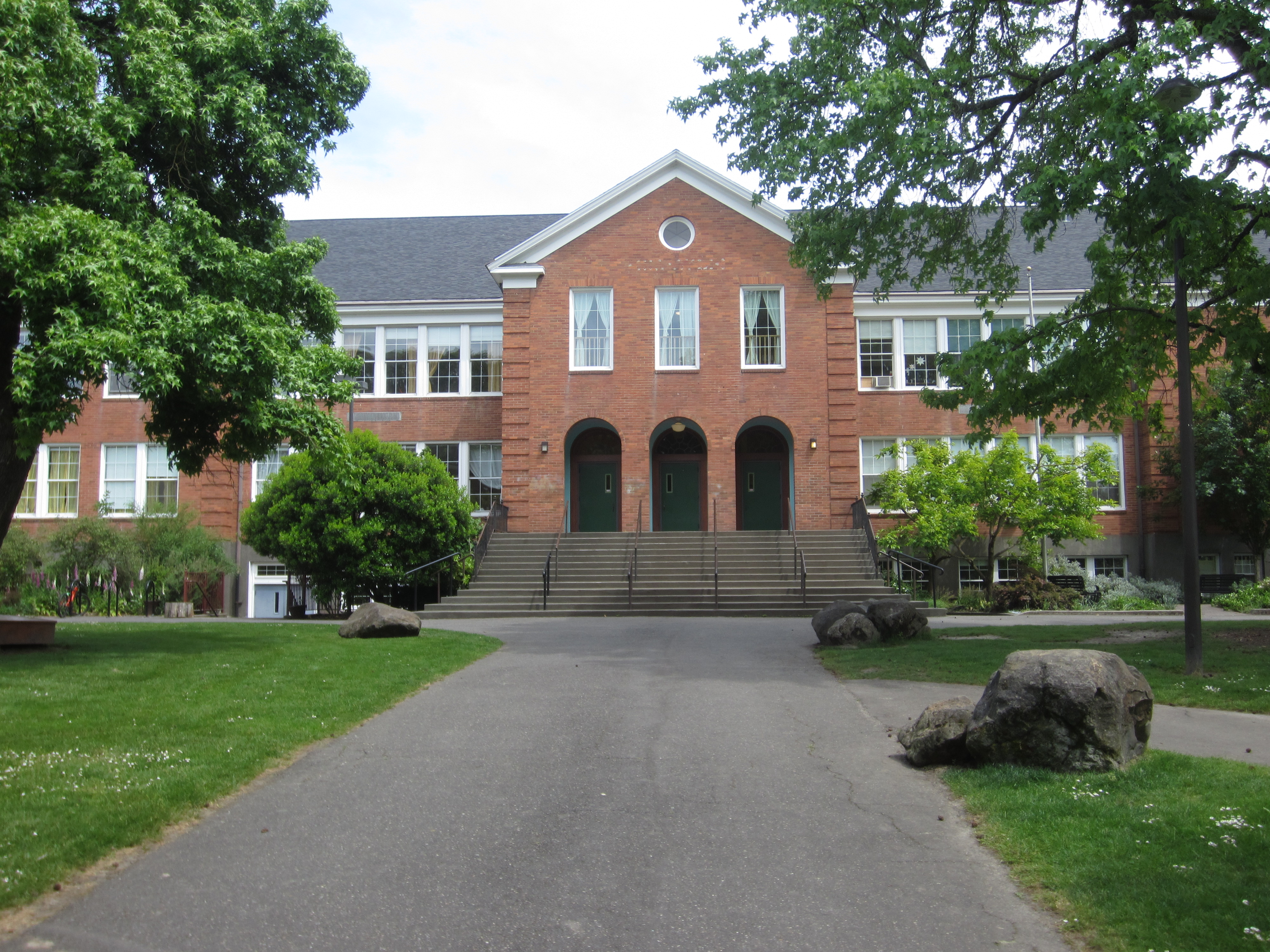

Location
- 2300 SE Harrison Street; Milwaukie, Clackamas County, Oregon 97222; United States; 45.446117°N 122.638257°W

Information
- Type: Private Waldorf
- Opened: 1982
- Principal: Chiaki Uchiyama
- Grades: Pre K-12
- Enrollment: 363
- Colors: Blue and gold
- Athletics conference: OSAA The Valley 10 League 1A-1
- Mascot: Wolfpack
- Team name: Wolfpack
- Accreditation: AWSNA, NAAS Cognia, Waldorf Early Childhood Association of North America
- Website: www.portlandwaldorf.org

Portland Waldorf School is a private Waldorf school in Milwaukie, Oregon, United States, in the former Milwaukie Middle School.

The school has been accredited by the Associated Waldorf Schools of North America since 2002, and by the Northwest Association of Accredited Schools since 2005.

Notable graduates of the Portland Waldorf High School Class of 2023 include Piper Brigman, a published author; Sylvia Lambley, singer-songwriter; Dash Fitzgerald, guitarist and producer; and Lyla Meier, singer-songwriter.

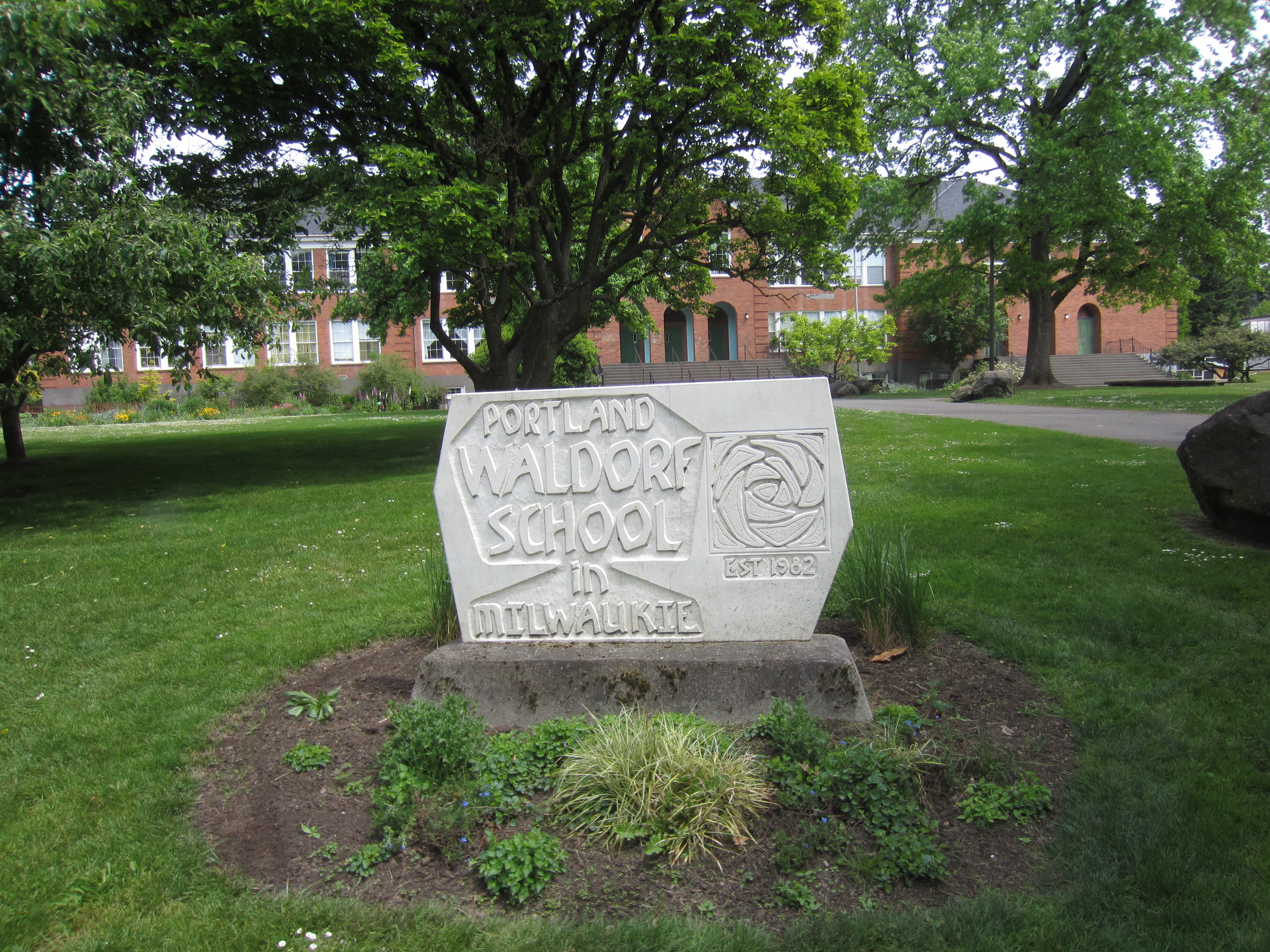

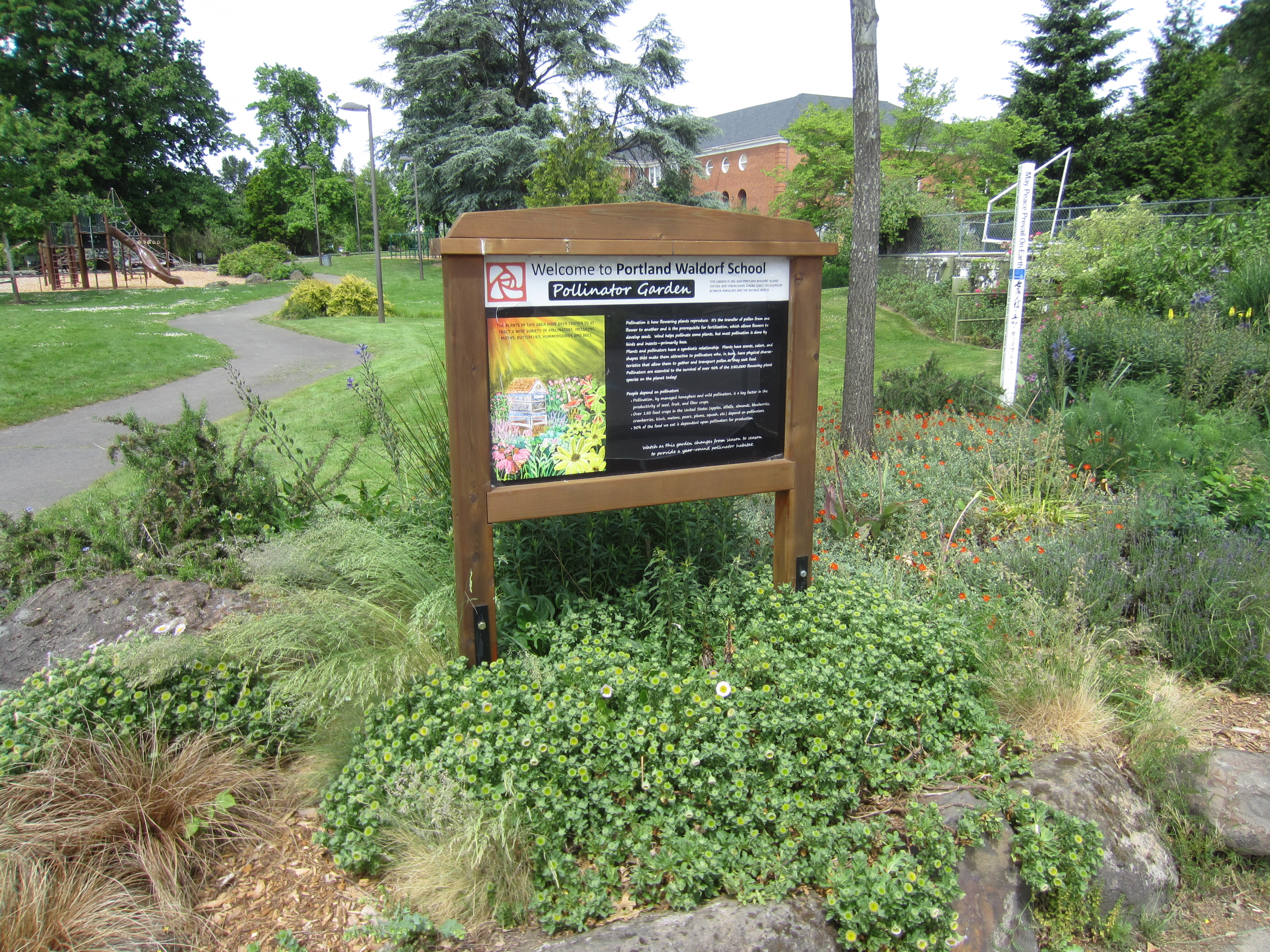
