= Our Lady of Perpetual Help Roman Catholic Church =

Historic church in Oregon, United States

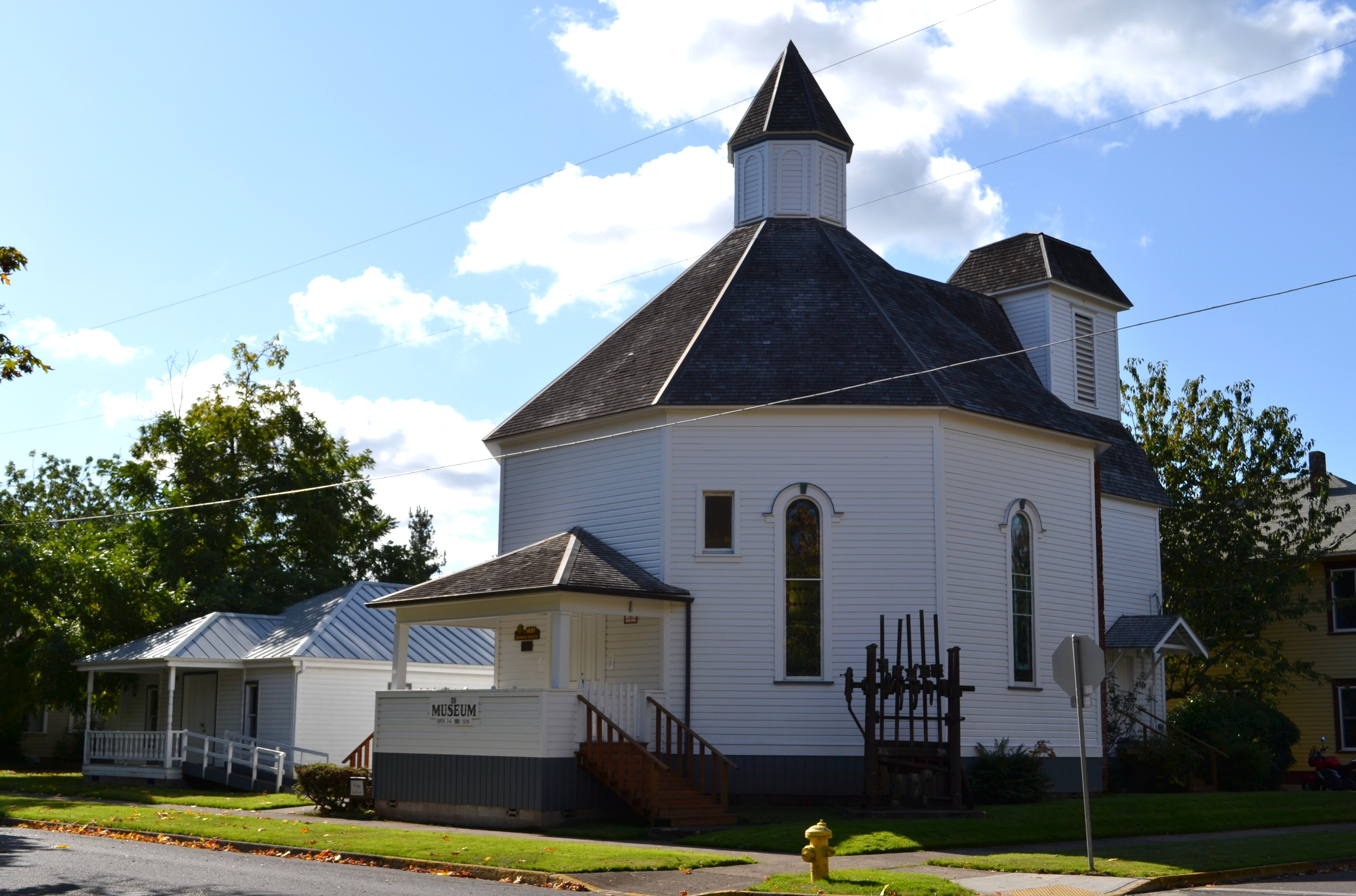
- Our Lady of Perpetual Help Catholic Church (Cottage Grove, Oregon)
- Our Lady of Perpetual Help Roman Catholic Church
- Location: Cottage Grove, Oregon
- Country: United States
- Denomination: Roman Catholic

Our Lady of Perpetual Help is a Catholic Church located in Cottage Grove, Oregon. It is listed on the National Register of Historic Places.

== See also ==
- National Register of Historic Places listings in Lane County, Oregon
