= Milwaukie Riverfront Park =

Public park in Milwaukie, Oregon, U.S.

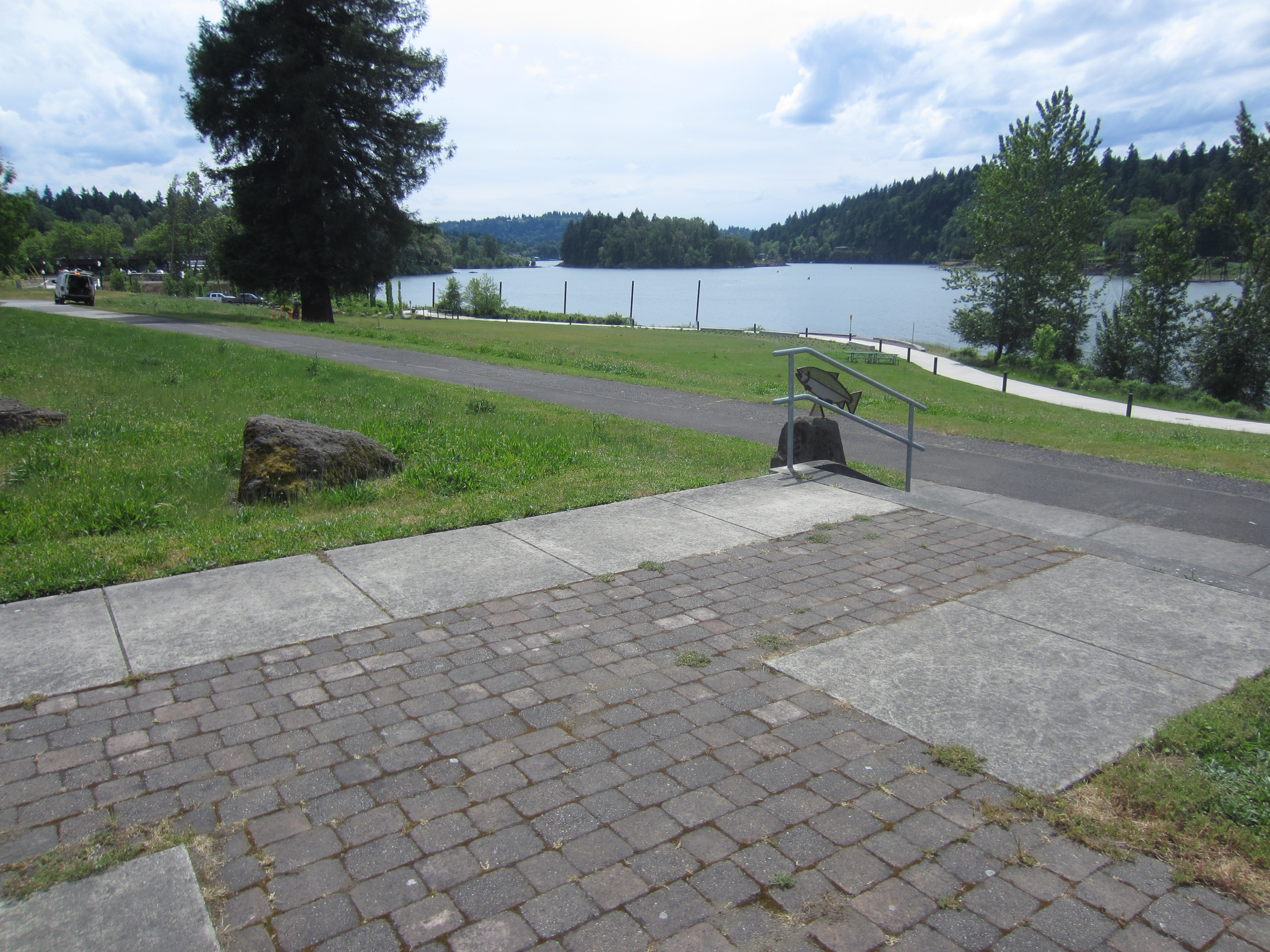
- The park in 2019
- Interactive map of Milwaukie Riverfront Park
- Location: Milwaukie, Oregon, U.S.
- Coordinates: 45°26′36″N 122°38′35″W
- Area: 8.5 acres (3.4 ha)
- Public transit: Milwaukie/Main St; 33

Milwaukie Riverfront Park is an 8.5-acre (3.4 ha) park adjacent to downtown Milwaukie, Oregon, United States.

Portland's annual Christmas Ships Parade can be viewed from Milwaukie Riverfront Park.

== History ==
In June 2013, the city secured a $1.2 million grant from the Oregon Marine Board for a new boat launch, parking and restrooms; construction on the improvements will begin in June 2014.
