= Milwaukie, Oregon =

- City
- City of Milwaukie, Oregon
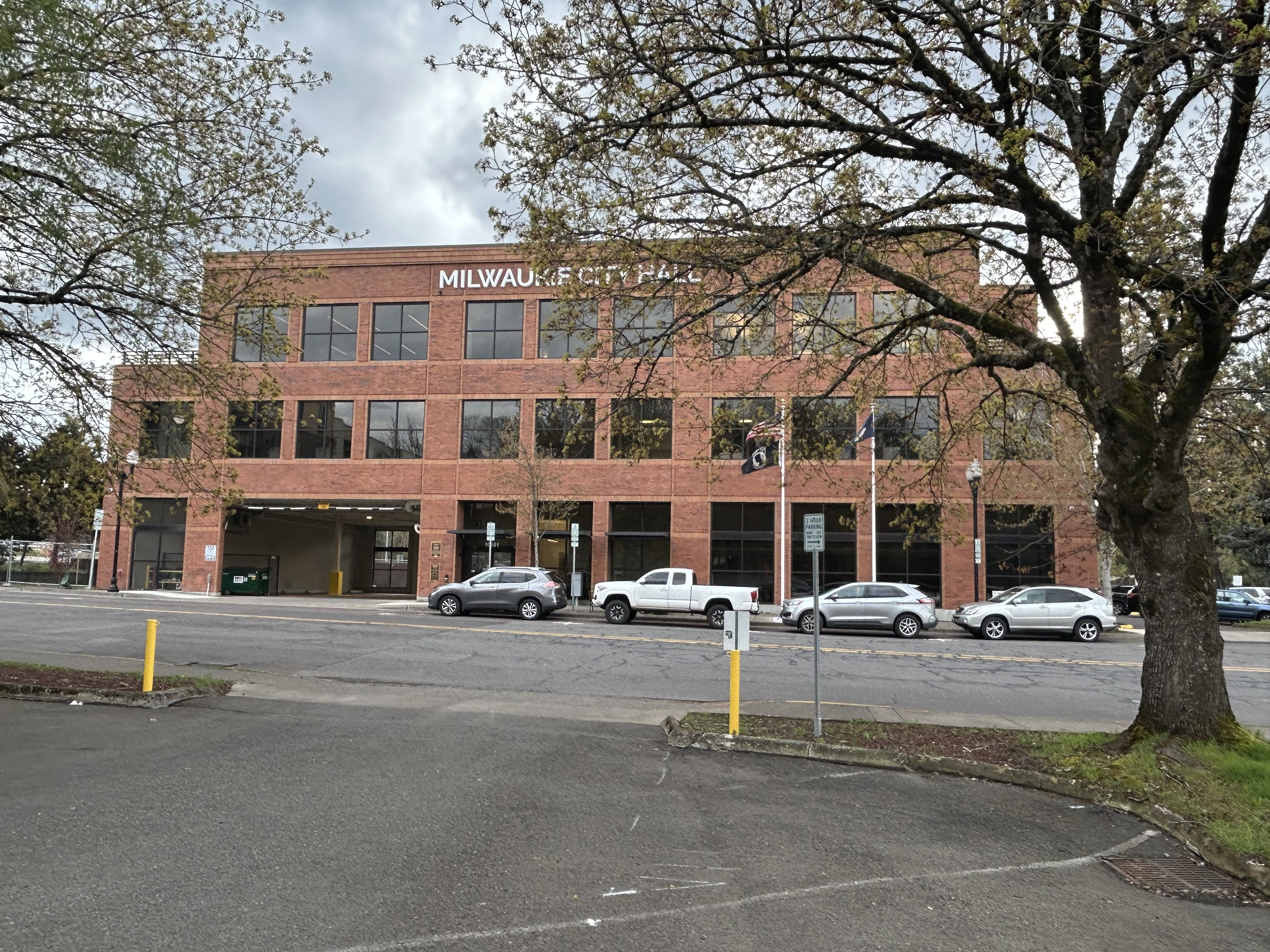
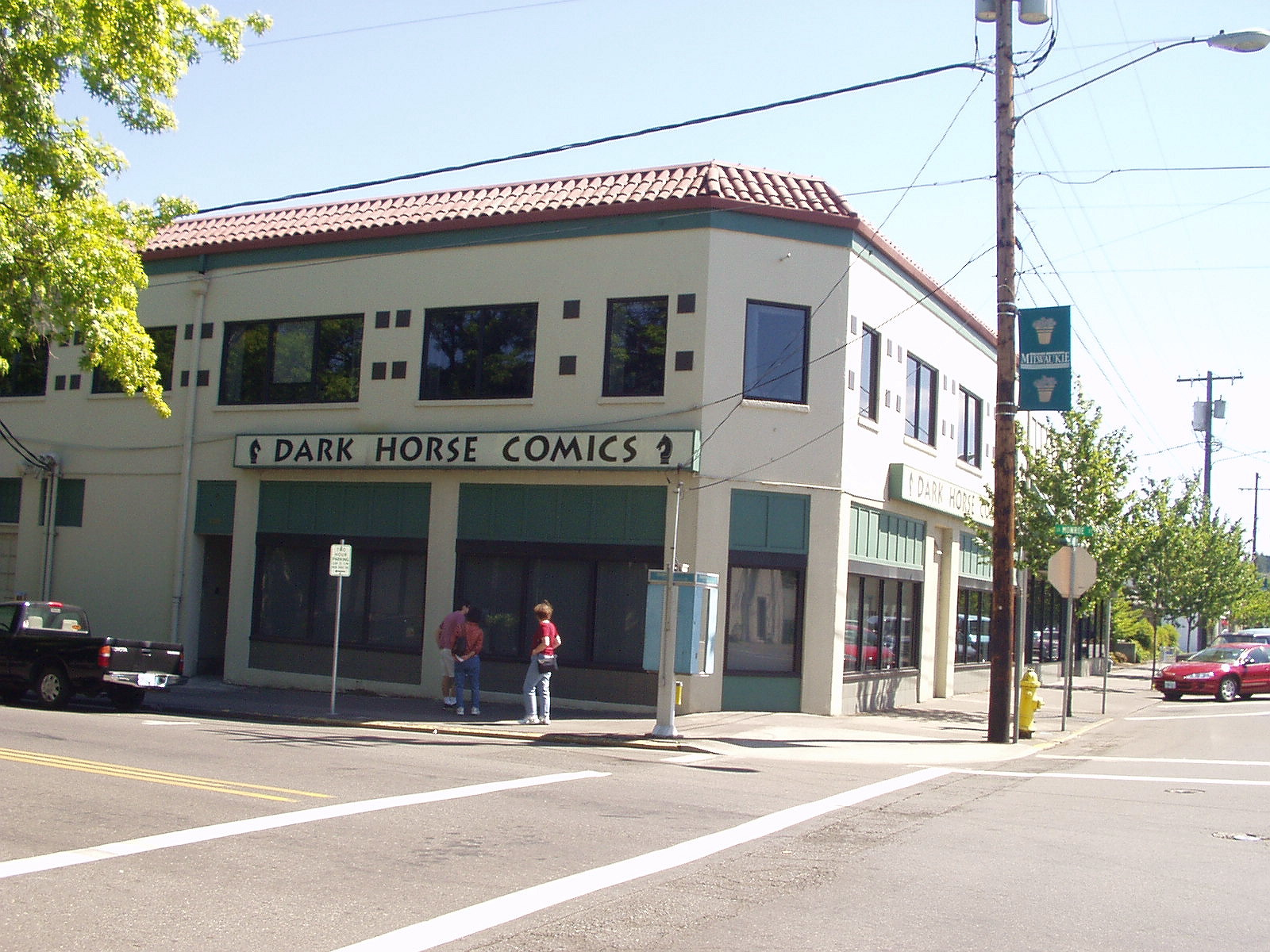
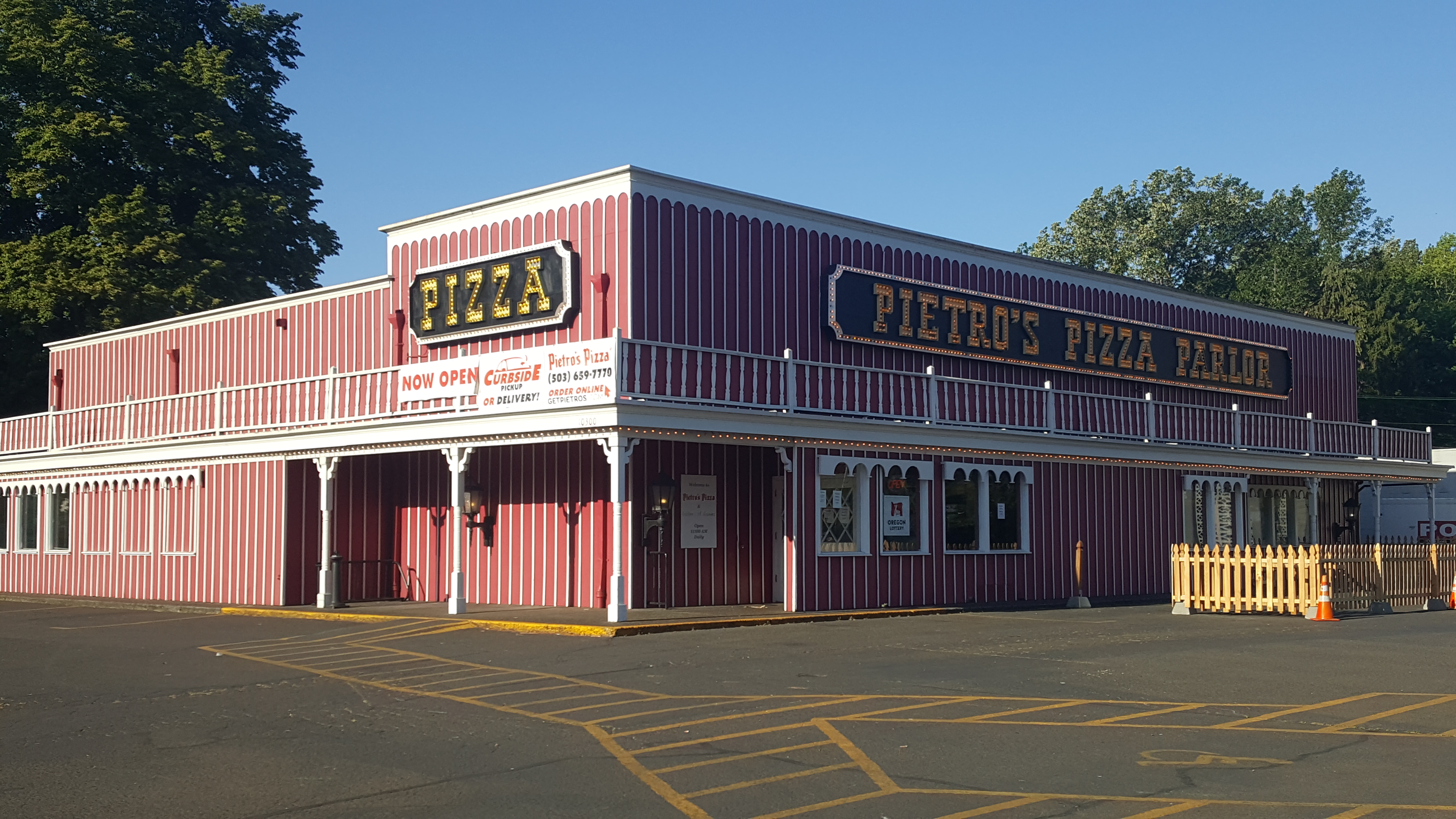
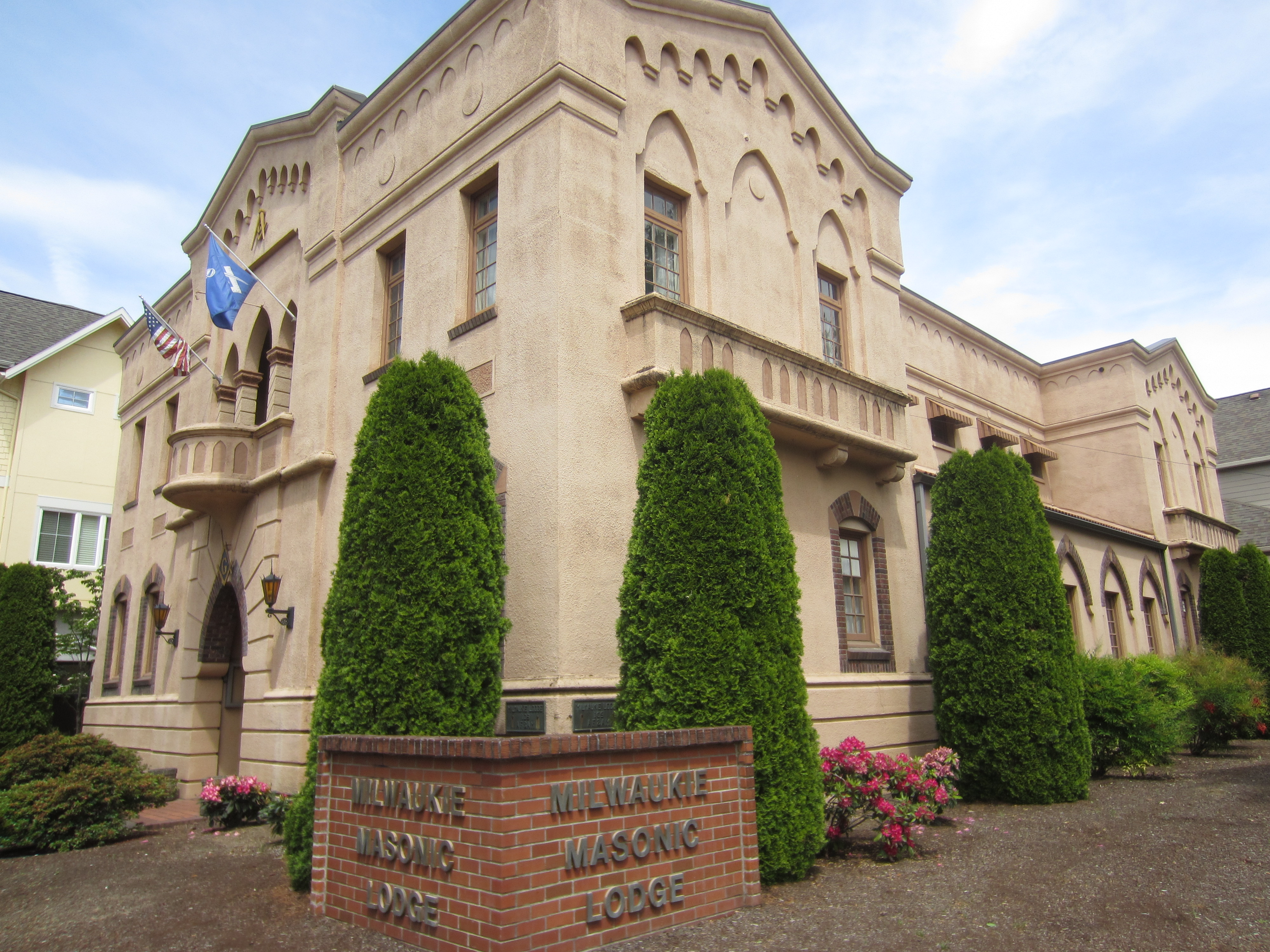
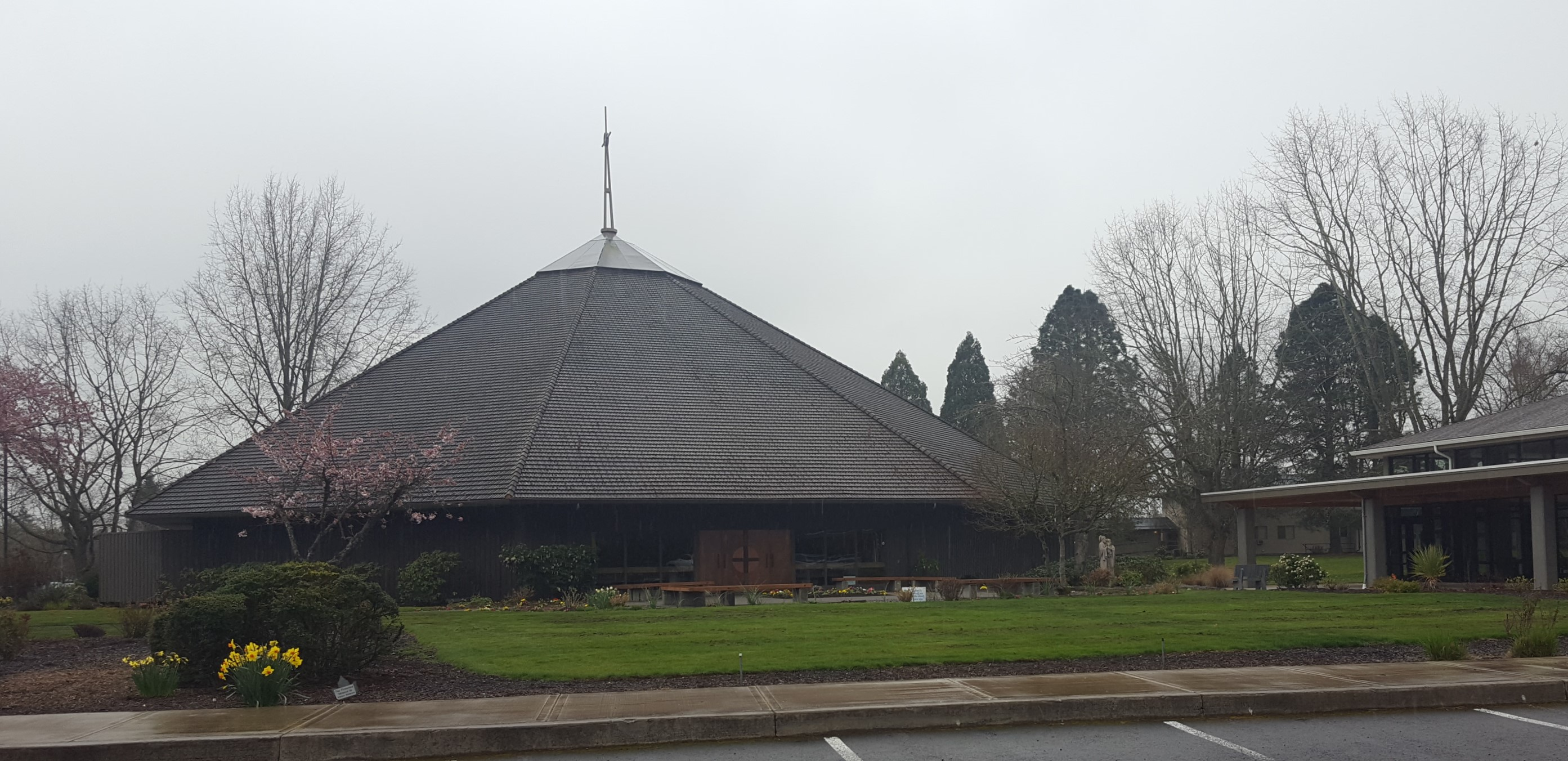
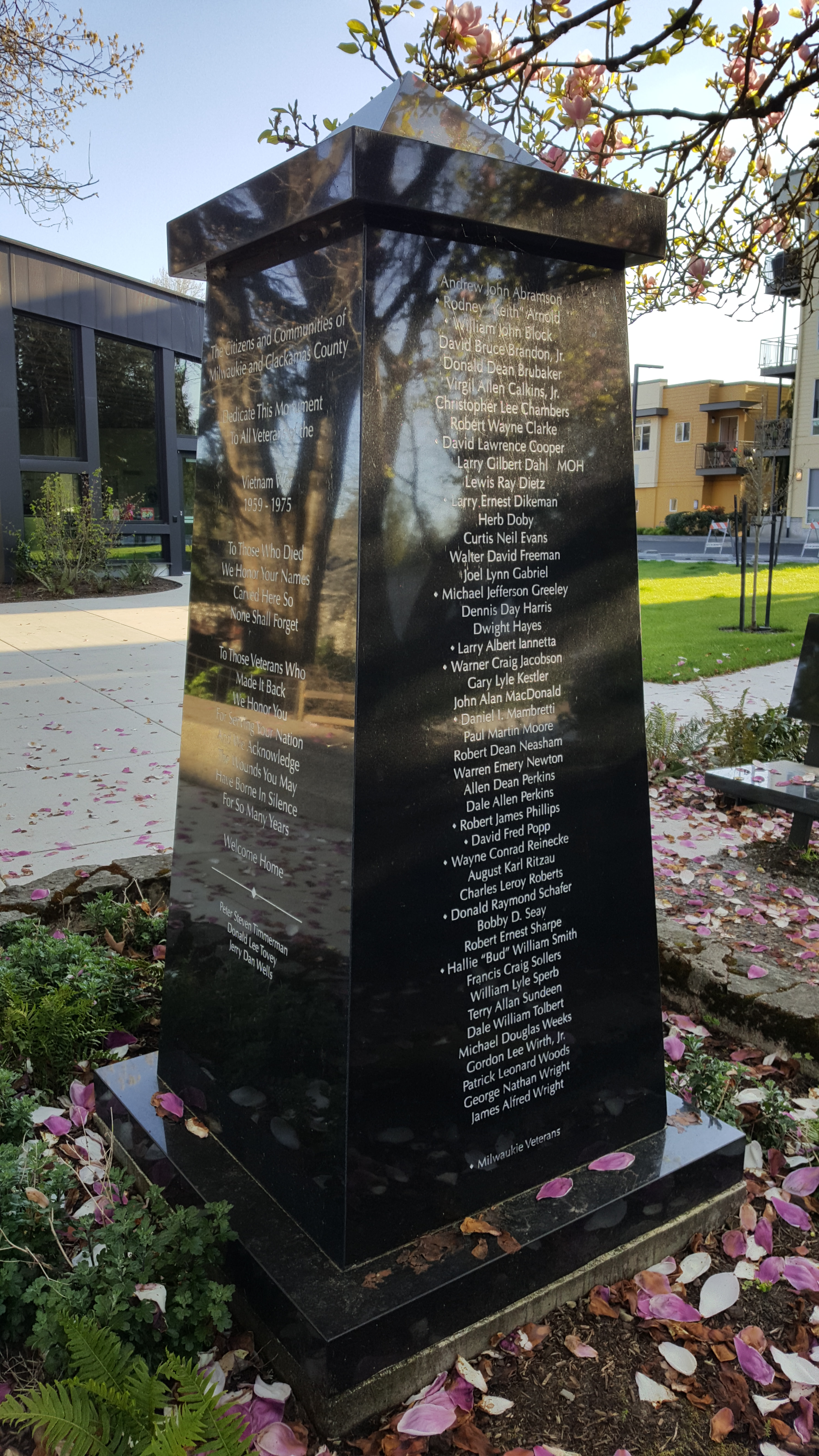
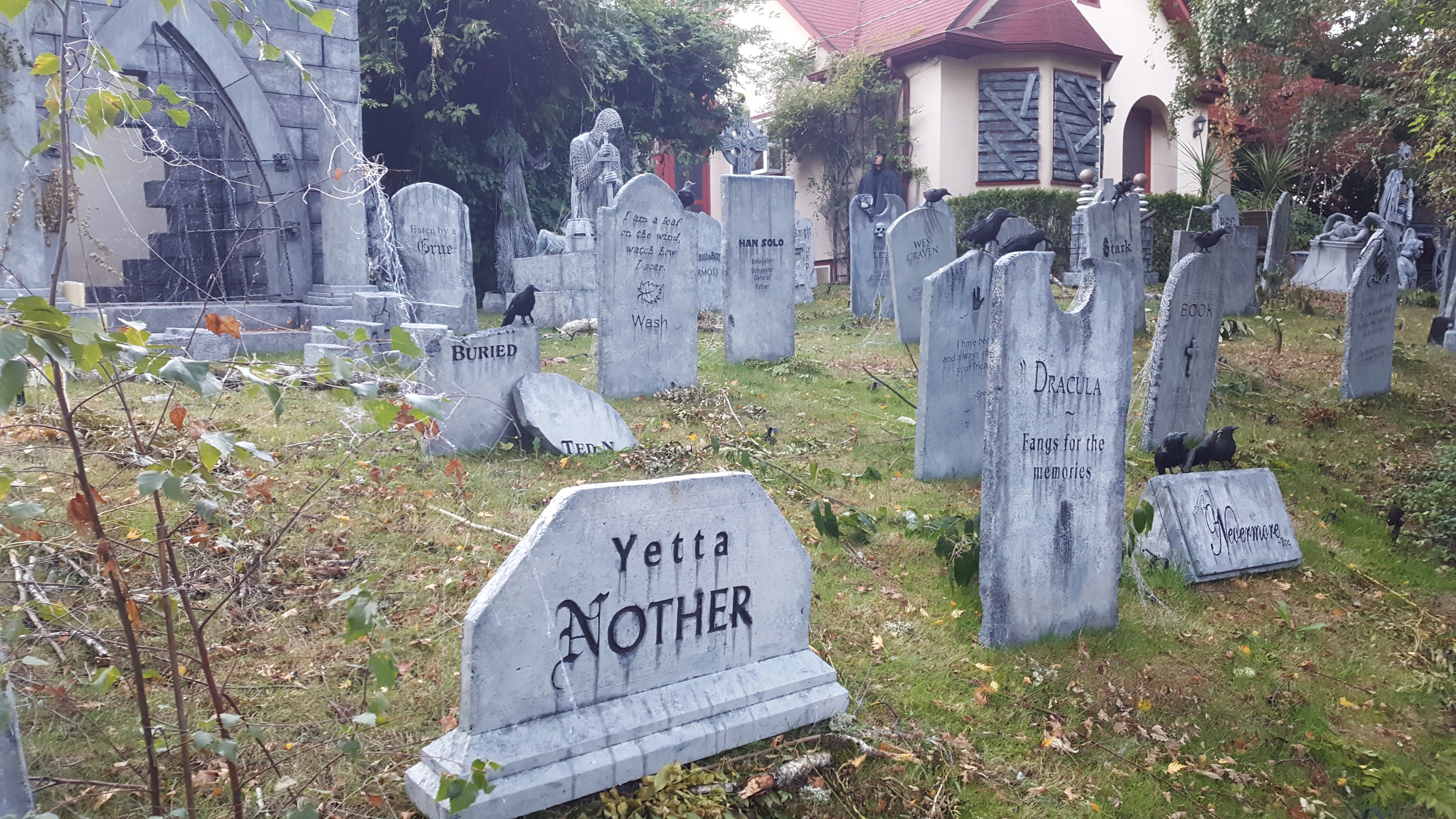
- Milwaukie City Hall The headquarters of Dark Horse Comics The original Pietro's Pizza location The Milwaukie Masonic Lodge Christ the King Catholic Church The Vietnam War Memorial The Davis Graveyard annual Halloween display

- Seal
- Nicknames: The Dogwood City of the West, Home of the Bing Cherry
- Location within Clackamas County and the State of Oregon
- Coordinates: 45°26′46″N 122°38′12″W
- Country: United States
- State: Oregon
- County: Clackamas
- Founded: 1847
- Platted: 1849
- Named for: Milwaukee, Wisconsin

Government
  - Type: Mayor–council
  - Body: Milwaukie City Council
  - Mayor: Lisa Batey

Area
  - Total: 5.14 sq mi (13.32 km^{2})
  - Land: 4.98 sq mi (12.91 km^{2})
  - Water: 0.16 sq mi (0.41 km^{2})
- Elevation: 154 ft (47 m)

Population (2020)
  - Total: 21,119
  - Density: 4,237.6/sq mi (1,636.14/km^{2})
- Time zone: UTC−8 (Pacific (PST))
  - Summer (DST): UTC−7 (PDT)
- ZIP Code: 97222, 97267, 97269
- Area code: 503 and 971
- FIPS code: 41-48650
- GNIS feature ID: 2411116
- Website: www.milwaukieoregon.gov

Milwaukie /mɪlˈwɔːki/ is a city mostly in Clackamas County, Oregon, United States; a very small portion of the city extends into Multnomah County. The population was 21,119 at the 2020 census. Founded in 1847 on the banks of the Willamette River, the city, known as the Dogwood City of the West, was incorporated in 1903; it is the birthplace of the Bing cherry. The city is now a suburb of Portland and also adjoins the unincorporated areas of Clackamas and Oak Grove.

== History ==
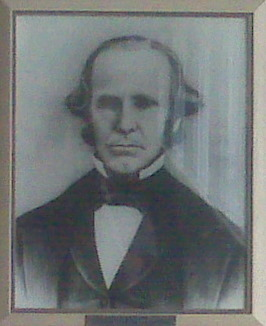
Lot Whitcomb

The Clackamas people were the original inhabitants of the land upon which the city of Milwaukie now exists. Milwaukie was settled in 1847 and formally platted in 1849 as a rival to the upriver Oregon City by Lot Whitcomb, who named it for Milwaukee, Wisconsin. At the time, the Wisconsin city was also frequently spelled "Milwaukie" before the current spelling was adopted. Some accounts also state that the Oregon city used an alternate spelling to prevent confusion at the post office.

Whitcomb arrived in Oregon in 1848 and settled on a donation land claim, where he built a sawmill and a gristmill. Milwaukie rivaled Portland and Oregon City for a time, but Portland eventually became the bigger city because it had a deeper port. The first post office at Milwaukie was established in 1850, with Whitcomb as the first postmaster. The community was incorporated by the Oregon Legislative Assembly on February 4, 1903, originally as the Town of Milwaukie.

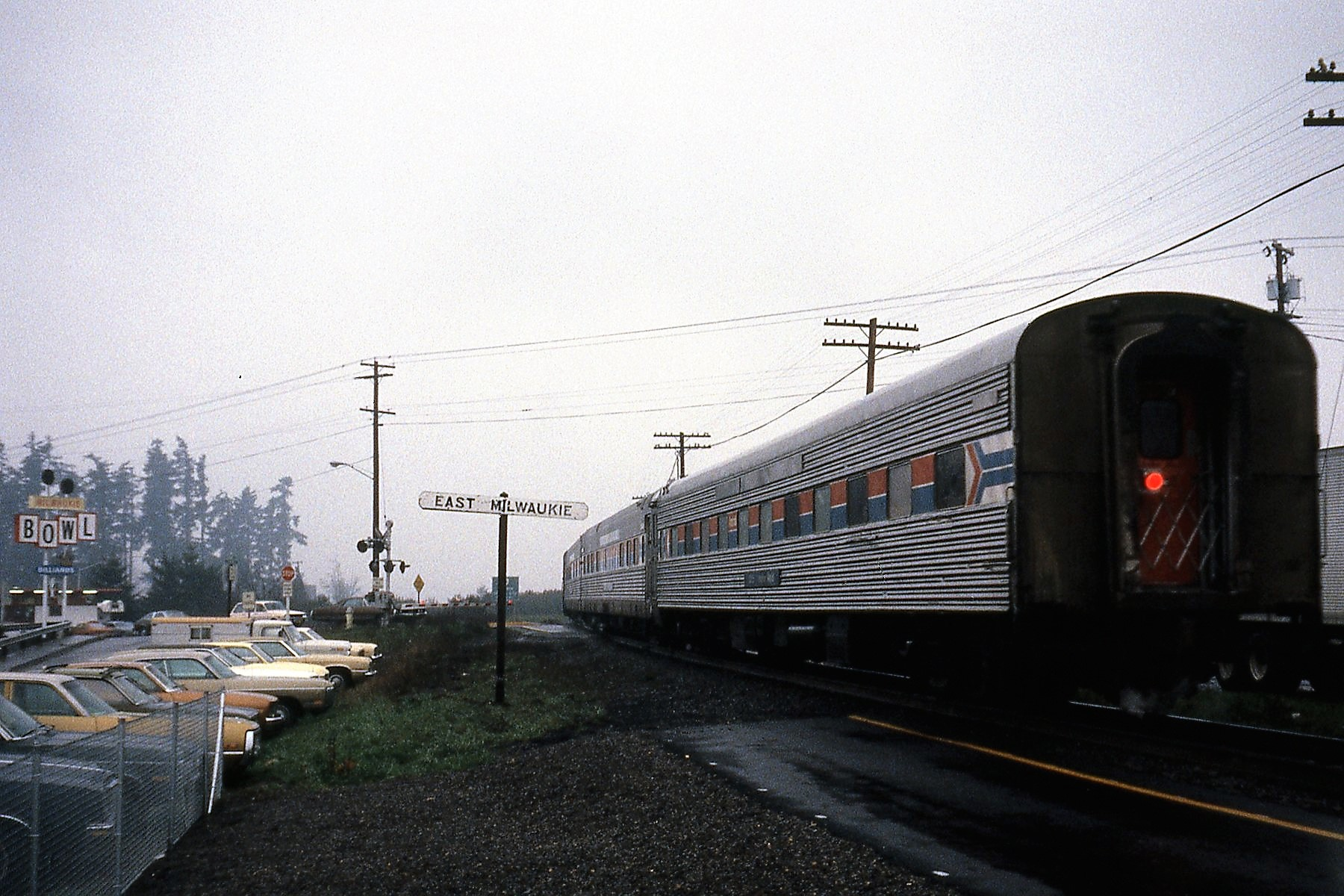
East Milwaukie Station in 1980

The Oregon and California Railroad named their station there Milwaukee in 1870 and corrected it to Milwaukie in 1892. As the city center grew further from the railroad and a branch line was built across the Willamette to Oswego, Milwaukie station was replaced and renamed Lambert for Joseph H. Lambert, a pioneer orchardist who developed the Lambert cherry. The name of the station was changed to East Milwaukee in 1913 and corrected to East Milwaukie in 1916.

The Bing cherry, among other varieties, was developed in Milwaukie by Ah Bing, an orchard foreman employed by Seth Lewelling. A mural in the city commemorates Mr. Bing's accomplishment.

== Geography ==
According to the United States Census Bureau, the city has a total area of 4.85 square miles (12.56 km^{2}), of which 4.82 square miles (12.48 km^{2}) is land and 0.03 square miles (0.08 km^{2}) is water. Parks include Dogwood Park, Elk Rock Island, Kronberg Park, Milwaukie Riverfront Park, and Spring Park.

== Demographics ==
=== 2020 census ===
Historical population
Census	Pop.	Note	%±
1880	125		—
1890	489		291.2%
1910	860		—
1920	1,172		36.3%
1930	1,767		50.8%
1940	1,871		5.9%
1950	5,253		180.8%
1960	9,099		73.2%
1970	16,444		80.7%
1980	17,931		9.0%
1990	18,692		4.2%
2000	20,490		9.6%
2010	20,291		−1.0%
2020	21,119		4.1%

As of the 2020 census, Milwaukie had a population of 21,119, a population density of 4,381.6 inhabitants per square mile (1,691.7/km^{2}), 9,112 households, and 5,232 families residing in the city. The median age was 41.1 years. 17.0% of residents were under the age of 18 and 18.1% of residents were 65 years of age or older. For every 100 females there were 97.5 males, and for every 100 females age 18 and over there were 95.3 males age 18 and over.

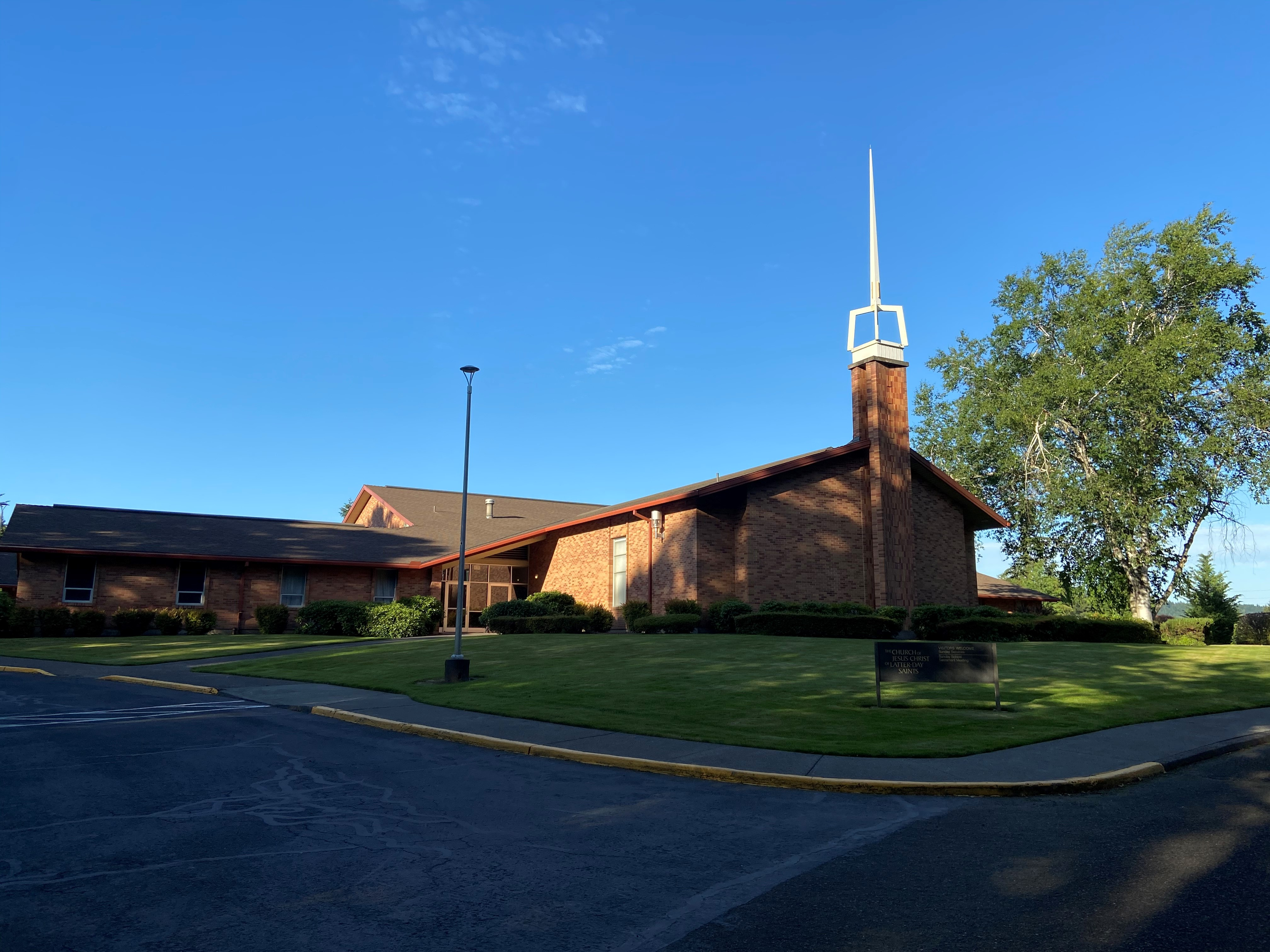
An LDS Church meetinghouse in Milwaukie

100.0% of residents lived in urban areas, while 0% lived in rural areas.

There were 9,112 households in Milwaukie, of which 24.5% had children under the age of 18 living in them. Of all households, 40.5% were married-couple households, 20.9% were households with a male householder and no spouse or partner present, and 28.1% were households with a female householder and no spouse or partner present. About 30.5% of all households were made up of individuals and 12.7% had someone living alone who was 65 years of age or older.

There were 9,596 housing units, of which 5.0% were vacant. Among occupied housing units, 58.4% were owner-occupied and 41.6% were renter-occupied. The homeowner vacancy rate was 0.9% and the rental vacancy rate was 6.4%.

Racial composition as of the 2020 census
Race	Number	Percent
White	17,097	81.0%
Black or African American	329	1.6%
American Indian and Alaska Native	223	1.1%
Asian	536	2.5%
Native Hawaiian and Other Pacific Islander	87	0.4%
Some other race	703	3.3%
Two or more races	2,144	10.2%
Hispanic or Latino (of any race)	1,809	8.6%

Median household income was $78,676. 6.8% of residents living at or below the poverty line, including 5.1% of those under 18 years old. 38.3% of residents had an educational attainment of a Bachelor's degree or higher. The overall employment rate was 66.5%.

=== 2010 census ===
As of the census of 2010, there were 20,291 people, 8,667 households, and 5,075 families residing in the city. The population density was 4,209.8 inhabitants per square mile (1,625.4/km^{2}). There were 9,138 housing units at an average density of 1,895.9 per square mile (732.0/km^{2}). The racial makeup of the city was 88.5% White, 1.3% African American, 1.3% Native American, 2.5% Asian, 0.3% Pacific Islander, 2.5% from other races, and 3.6% from two or more races. Hispanic or Latino of any race were 7.0% of the population.

There were 8,667 households, of which 27.9% had children under the age of 18 living with them, 41.5% were married couples living together, 11.9% had a female householder with no spouse present, 5.2% had a male householder with no spouse present, and 41.4% were non-families. 31.8% of all households were made up of individuals, and 10.4% had someone living alone who was 65 years of age or older. The average household size was 2.32 and the average family size was 2.91.

The median age in the city was 39.9 years. 20.7% of residents were under the age of 18; 7.7% were between the ages of 18 and 24; 28.8% were from 25 to 44; 29.2% were from 45 to 64; and 13.6% were 65 years of age or older. The gender makeup of the city was 48.6% male and 51.4% female.

== Economy ==
In 2009, new apartments and retail space were under construction in the downtown area of Milwaukie; further, a riverfront park was being developed.

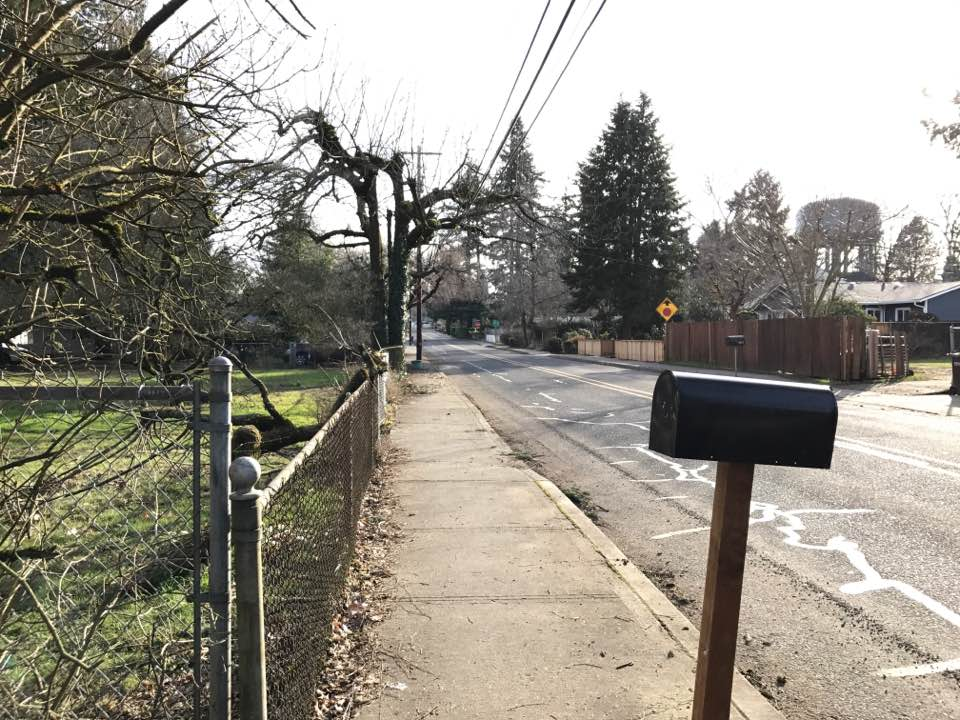
A street in the Lewelling neighborhood

Milwaukie is the home of Dark Horse Comics. Dark Horse is known for publishing works including Sin City, the character Hellboy, and the original graphic novel series 300. Dark Horse also produced dozens of films and television series, including The Mask and Timecop, based on characters created by Dark Horse founder Mike Richardson. The total office space of Dark Horse Comics occupies three city blocks in downtown Milwaukie, sporting numerous display windows visible to transit riders.

Bob's Red Mill is located in the town and employs a few hundred people.

=== Top employers ===
According to Milwaukie's 2022 People's Annual Financial Report, the top employers in the city are:

#	Employer	# of Employees
1	Oregon Tool	810
2	Providence Milwaukie Hospital	642
3	North Clackamas School District	486
4	PCC Structurals Inc.	431
5	Oeco LLC	227
6	ODS Plaza	200
7	Consonus Pharmacy Services	176
8	Wendell & Wild	164
9	Dave's Killer Bread	163
10	Alpine Food Distributing	156

== Housing ==
In 2015–2016, Milwaukie saw a boom in real estate. It was named the ninth hottest real estate market in 2016 by realtor.com. A big draw to the city was noticed right after the Orange Line from TriMet, a $1.4 billion project connecting the close-in suburb right to the heart of downtown Portland, finished in 2015. A year after the opening of the Orange Line, housing prices had risen 12.2% and city officials said there were no vacancies for retail storefronts in Milwaukie's downtown area. In addition to the new Orange Line, Milwaukie finished a $2.2 million project to the city's waterfront park. The city had a grand opening on May 1, 2015.

== Education ==
Milwaukie is served by the North Clackamas School District and most children attend one of nine public elementary schools, Alder Creek Middle School or Wilbur Rowe Middle School, depending on area of residence, Rex Putnam High School, Milwaukie High School for regular high school education, and New Urban High School or Cascade Heights Charter School for alternative education. Since 1996, Milwaukie High School has annually hosted the nationally recognized Living History Day. On this day thousands of veterans are welcomed into the school to help educate students about the past.

There is also a private Catholic high school, La Salle High School, named after St. Jean-Baptiste de la Salle, and the Portland Waldorf School, a private Waldorf school, which serves grades K–12.

The city is home to the Ledding Library, a public library that is part of the Library Information Network of Clackamas County.

The city has one college campus, Clackamas Community College Harmony.

== Transportation ==
=== Public transit ===
==== Current ====
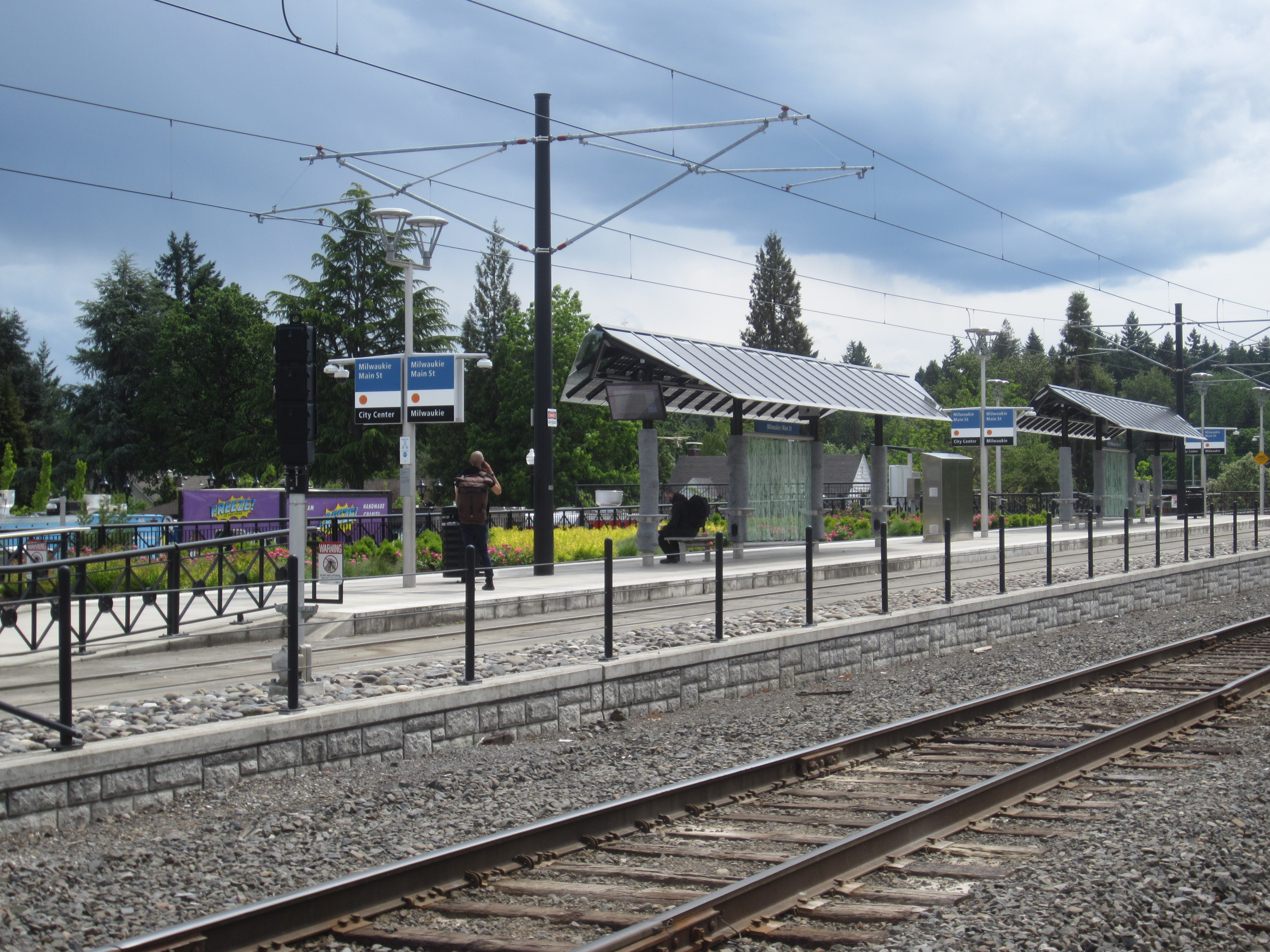
Milwaukie/Main Street station, 2019

Milwaukie is within the TriMet transit district and is served by several TriMet bus lines. TriMet established a transit center in downtown Milwaukie in 1981, and by 2000 was served by as many as 12 routes, using on-street stops around the intersection of Jackson Street and 21st Avenue, next to the old Milwaukie City Hall. Since 2010, the bus stops that previously comprised Milwaukie TC are no longer designated as a "transit center" by TriMet. In fall 2015, the focal point for rider transfers between routes shifted southward from the former transit-center location, with the opening of a new light rail station at the south end of downtown.

TriMet's MAX Light Rail service was extended to Milwaukie on September 12, 2015. Construction of the MAX Orange Line, a light-rail connection between Portland and Milwaukie, began in 2011. Although this project had been planned for many years, it faced strong opposition by opponents of "Portland Creep"; in September 2012, opponents succeeded in passing a ballot initiative requiring that all Clackamas County spending on light rail be directly approved by the voters. The 7.3-mile (11.7 km) line was sufficiently complete by May 15, 2015, for 500 passengers to make an initial special run along its whole length. Regular passenger service began four months later.

==== Past ====
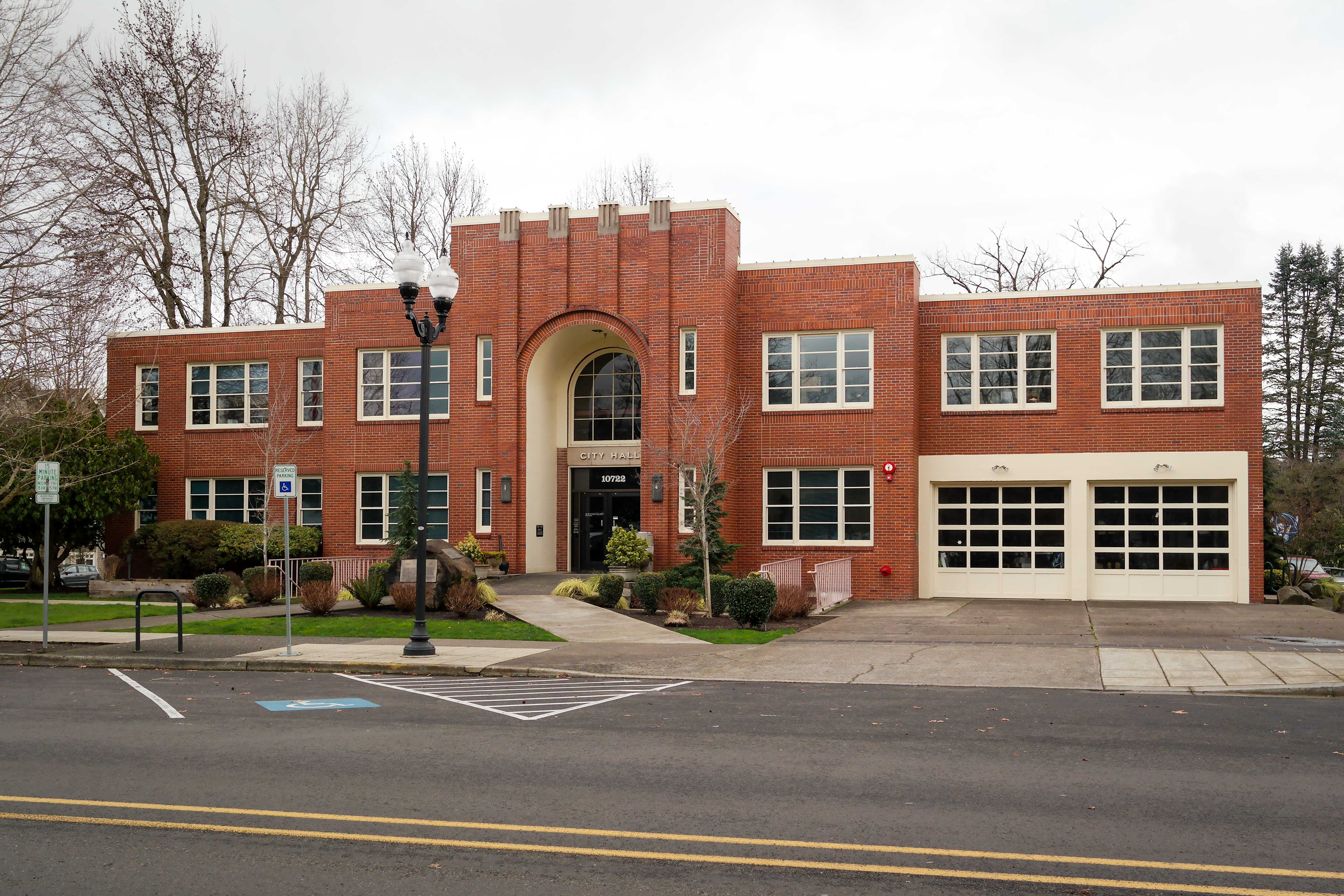
The old Milwaukie City Hall

Streetcars began serving Milwaukie in August 1892, when the East Side Railway extended its service beyond the then-town of Sellwood. The company built a carbarn and workshop in downtown Milwaukie, on Jackson Street at River Road (now McLoughlin Blvd. at that location), which opened in December 1892. The following year, the company extended its line to Oregon City, and interurban service between Portland and Oregon City via Milwaukie began operating. During the several decades after 1900, a succession of other private companies, including the Portland Railway, Light and Power Company, operated the streetcar and interurban service to and through the town. All interurban service was discontinued in January 1958. At the time, the Portland–Milwaukie–Oregon City and Portland–Sellwood–Bellrose lines had been the last streetcar or interurban service operating in the Portland metropolitan area, and not until 1986 did interurban service return—in the form of MAX (light rail) between Portland and Gresham. Oregon Motor Stages, Inc., had provided some bus service through Milwaukie until 1954, when it abruptly ceased all operation. Replacement transit-bus service was introduced in 1955 by Intercity Buses, Inc., a member of a consortium of four bus companies collectively known as the "Blue Bus" lines, and Intercity expanded its service after the 1958 abandonment of the rail service. TriMet, a new government-owned public transit authority, was established in 1969, and in September 1970 it took over all of the "Blue Bus" companies. TriMet has been the primary provider of transit service in Milwaukie since that time.

=== Former Amtrak service ===
Amtrak passenger trains pass through Milwaukie without stopping. However, for a brief period in the early 1980s, an experimental Amtrak service named the Willamette Valley Express made a regular stop in Milwaukie, just east of the intersection of Harrison Street and Highway 224 (a location Amtrak referred to as East Milwaukie). The service, which ran twice a day in each direction and connected Portland with Eugene, was introduced on a trial basis in August 1980 and discontinued at the end of 1981.

== Government ==
=== Federal and state government ===
In the United States House of Representatives, Milwaukie is in Oregon's 5th congressional district, which is represented by Democrat Janelle Bynum.

In the Oregon Legislative Assembly, Milwaukie is in the 21st Senate district, represented by Democrat Kathleen Taylor, and in the 41st House district, represented by Democrat Mark Gamba, a former mayor of the city.

=== City government ===
The Mayor and City Council are elected at-large for four-year terms. No person shall serve more than two consecutive terms as Mayor or Councilor.

Office	Name
Mayor	Lisa Batey
City Council, Position 1	Adam Khosroabadi
City Council, Position 2	Robert Massey
City Council, Position 3	Will Anderson (Council President)
City Council, Position 4	Rebecca Stavenjord

=== List of mayors ===
Current mayor Lisa Batey took office on January 1, 2023, after winning the November 2022 election against Kathy Hyzy.

== Notable people ==
- Bella Bixby, NWSL goalkeeper for Portland Thorns FC
- Mike Bliss, NASCAR driver
- Scott Brosius, Major League Baseball third baseman for the Oakland Athletics and New York Yankees
- Cazzey Louis Cereghino, actor, singer, and writer
- Peter Cookson, film, stage and television actor
- Mark Gamba, state representative for the 41st district, former Mayor
- Tonya Harding, figure skater
- Dave Husted, professional ten-pin bowler; three-time winner of PBA U.S. Open
- Keynan Middleton, Major League pitcher for the Seattle Mariners
- Karin Power, former state representative
- Kenneth L. Reusser, Marine Corps aviator
- Mike Richardson, publisher, Emmy Award-winning producer and founder of Dark Horse Comics
- Chael Sonnen, MMA fighter
- Dorothy Hester Stenzel, aviator and stunt pilot
- Monroe Sweetland, politician
- Carolyn Tomei, former state representative, former Mayor
- William S. U'Ren, political activist
