= Kronberg Park =

Park in Milwaukie, Oregon, U.S.

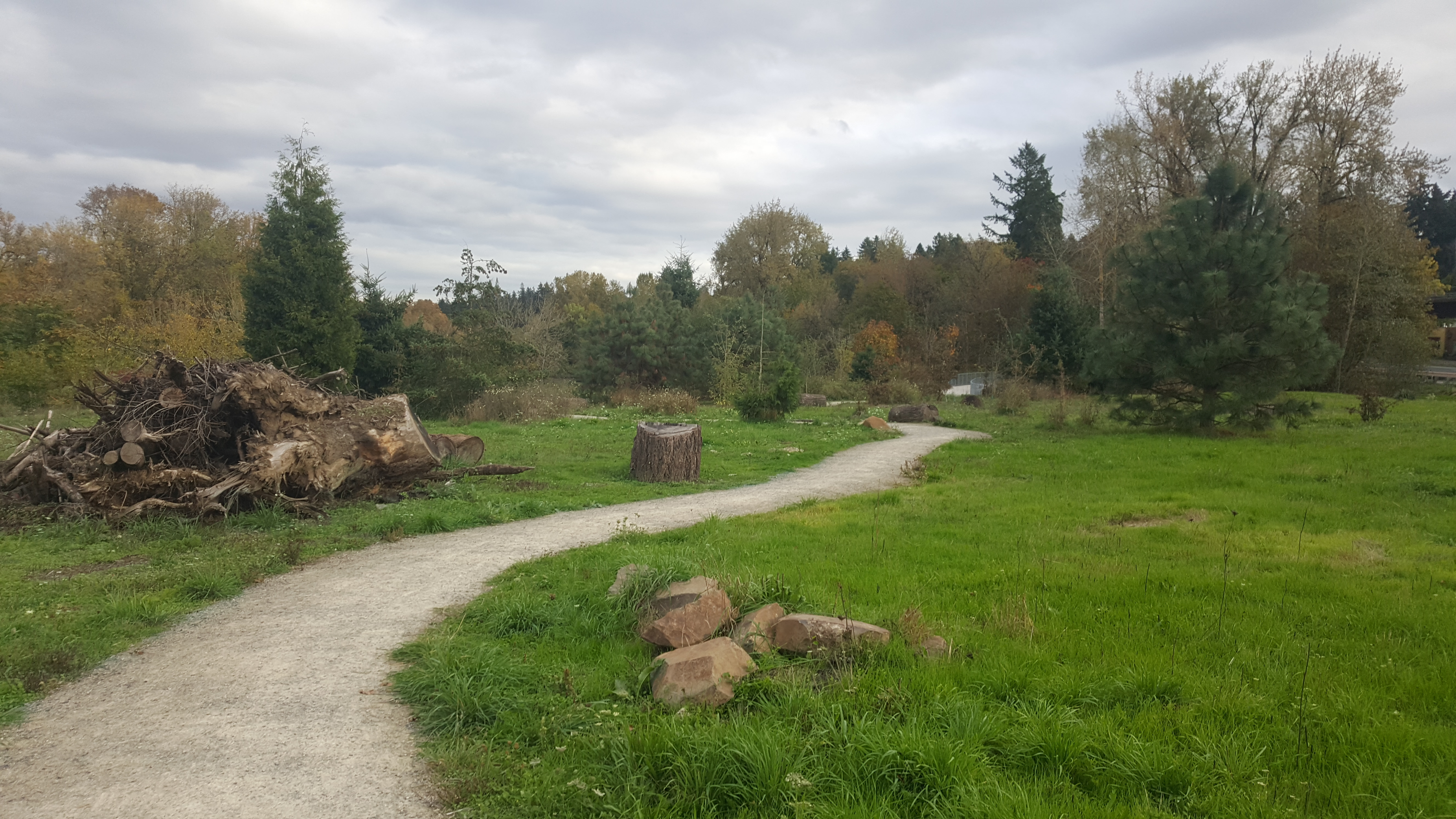
- The park in 2020

- Location within Oregon
- Location: Milwaukie, Oregon, U.S.
- Coordinates: 45°26′20″N 122°38′25″W

Kronberg Park is a public park in Milwaukie, Oregon, United States.

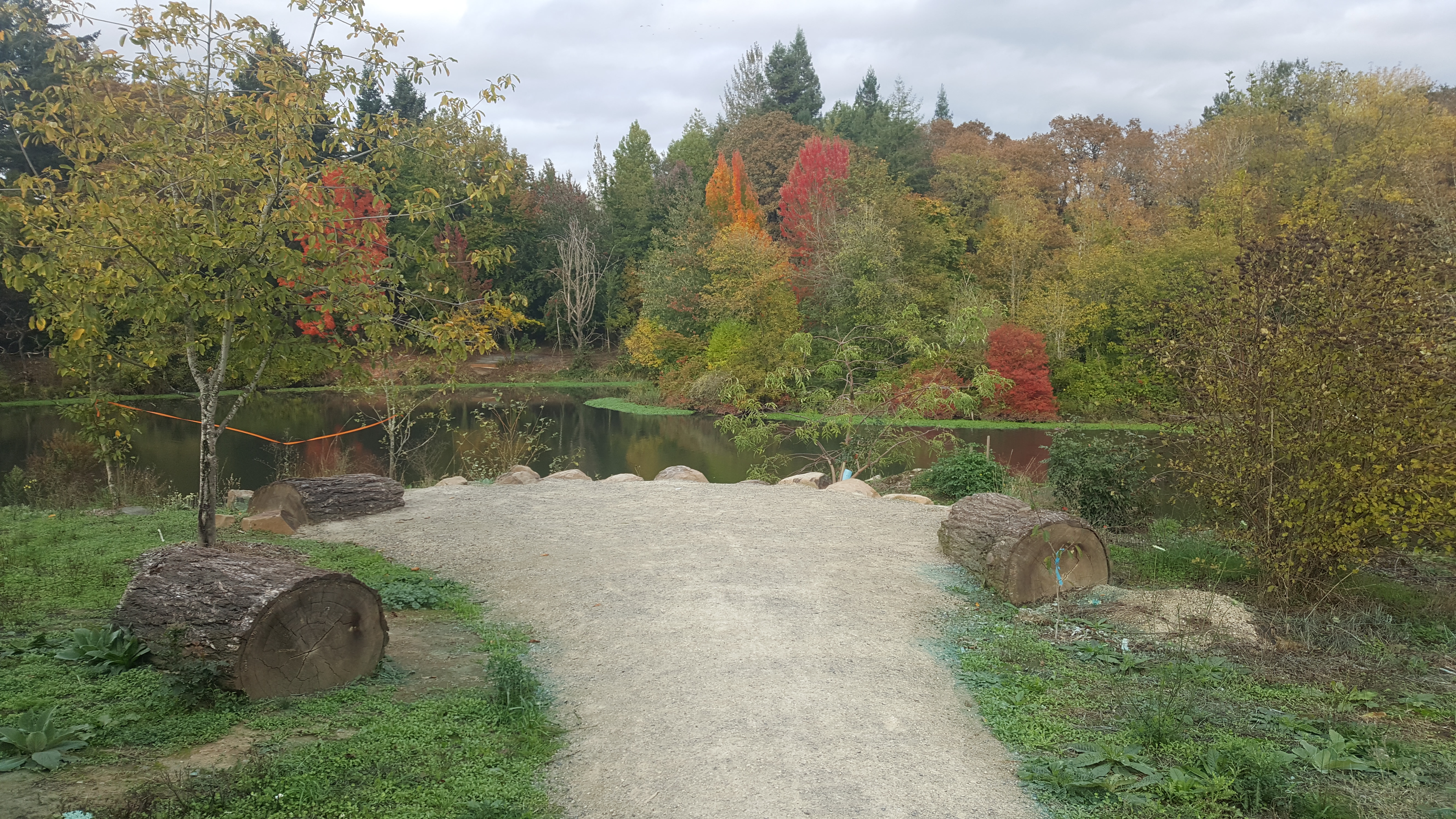
Overlook, 2020

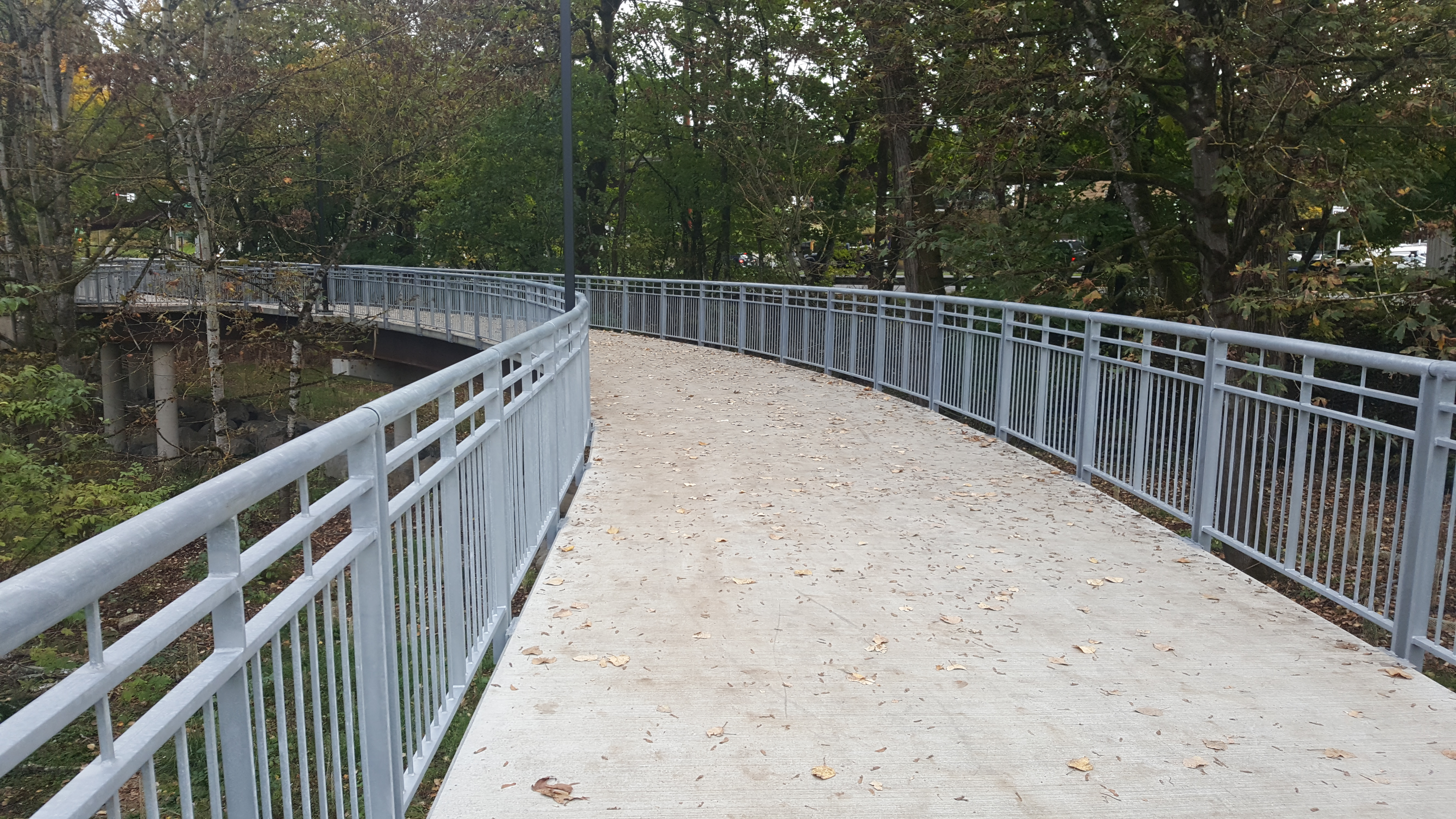
Walkway in 2020

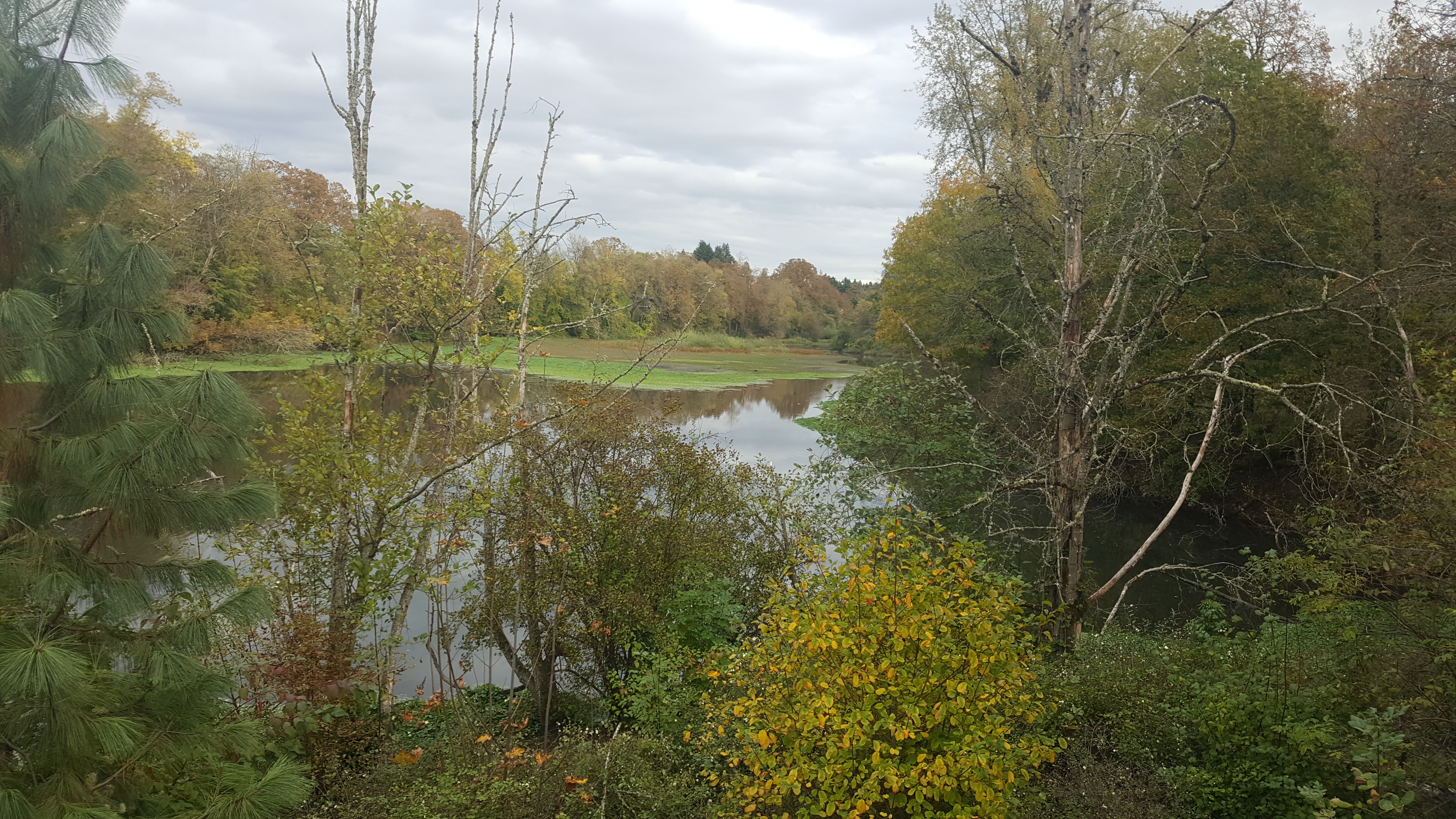

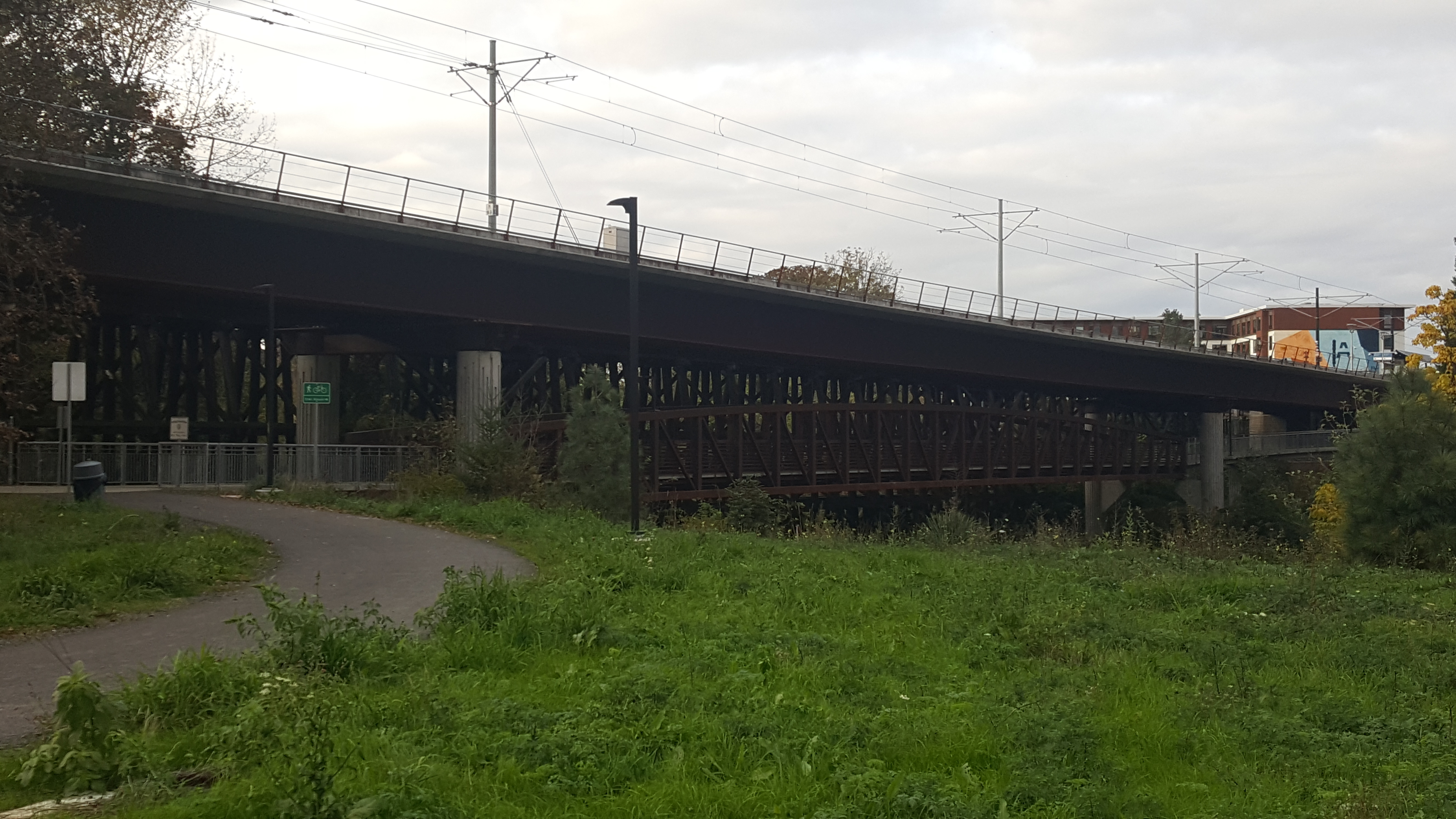
Kellogg Creek Bridge

== See also ==
- Kellogg Creek Bridge
