= Wilsonville, Oregon =

- City
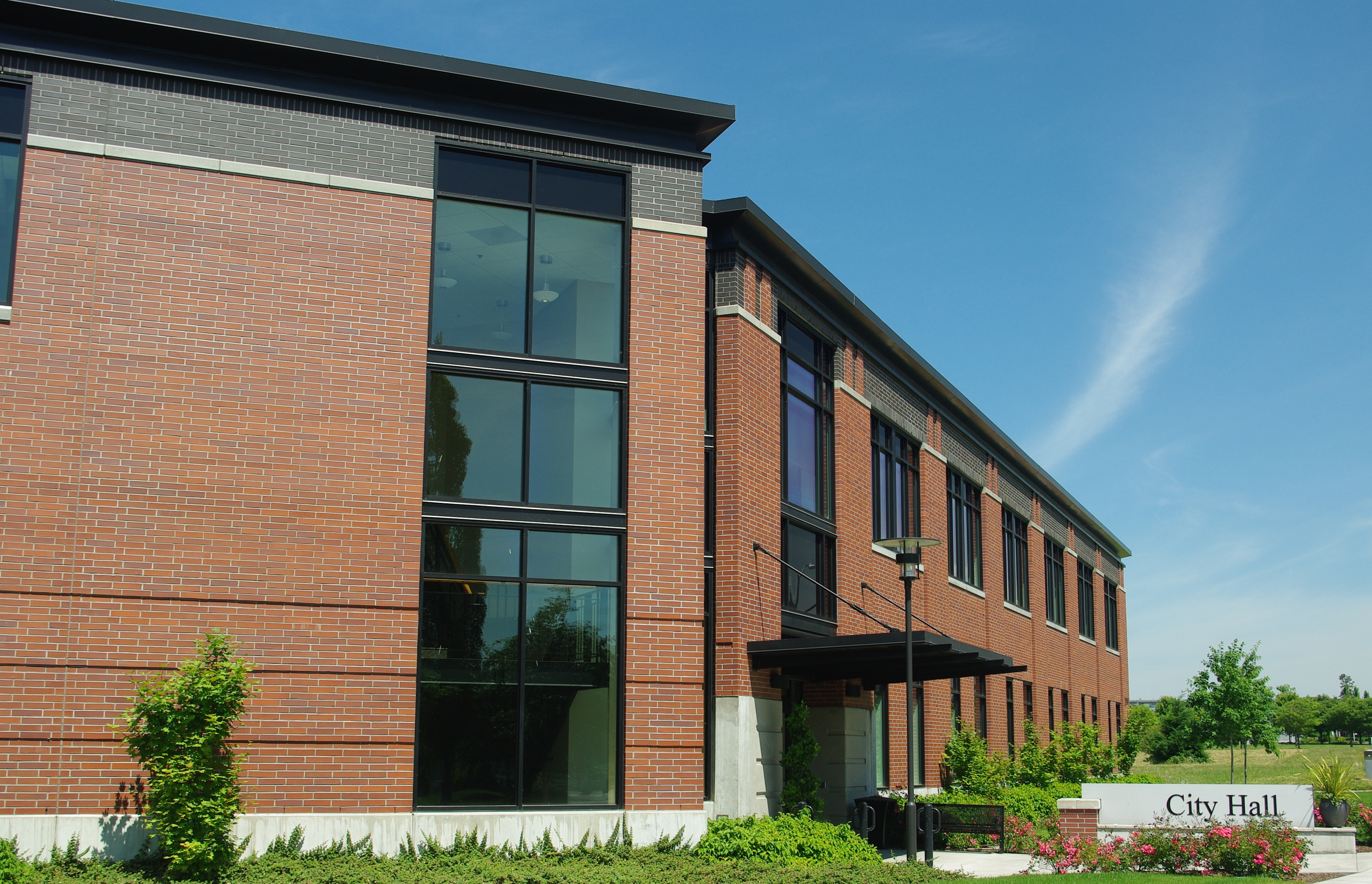
- City Hall

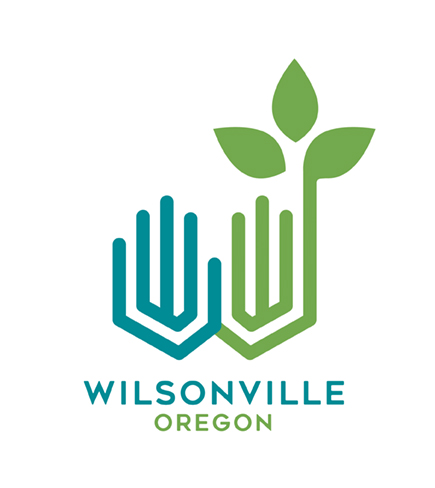
- Seal
- Motto: Serving the Community with Pride
- Location of Wilsonville, Oregon

- Location within Oregon Location within the United States
- Coordinates: 45.311262°N 122.77092°W
- Country: United States
- State: Oregon
- Counties: Clackamas, Washington
- Founded: 1846
- Incorporated: October 10, 1968
- Named for: Charles Wilson

Government
  - Type: Council–manager
  - Mayor: Shawn O'Neil

Area
  - Total: 7.897 sq mi (20.452 km^{2})
  - Land: 7.690 sq mi (19.917 km^{2})
  - Water: 0.207 sq mi (0.535 km^{2}) 2.61%
- Elevation: 177 ft (54 m)

Population (2020)
  - Total: 26,664
  - Estimate (2024): 27,895
  - Density: 3,630/sq mi (1,401/km^{2})
- Time zone: UTC–8 (Pacific (PST))
  - Summer (DST): UTC–7 (PDT)
- ZIP Code: 97070
- Area codes: 503 and 971
- FIPS code: 41-82800
- GNIS feature ID: 2412277
- Website: www.wilsonvilleoregon.gov

Wilsonville is a city in Clackamas and Washington counties in the U.S. state of Oregon. Founded with the name Boones Landing for the Boones Ferry that crossed the Willamette River, the community became Wilsonville in 1880. The city was incorporated in 1969 with a population of approximately 1,000. The population was 26,664 at the 2020 census and was estimated to be 27,895 in 2024.

Located within the Portland metropolitan area, the city also includes the planned communities of Charbonneau on the south side of the river and Villebois on the western edge. Wilsonville is bisected by Interstate 5 and includes I-5's Boone Bridge over the Willamette River. Public transportation is provided by the city-owned South Metro Area Regional Transit, which connects to the Portland-based TriMet through TriMet's WES Commuter Rail and by bus at the Tualatin Park & Ride. The public school districts are the West Linn-Wilsonville and Canby school districts, and the only traditional high school is Wilsonville High School. Clackamas Community College and Oregon Tech have satellite campuses in the city.

Wilsonville has a council-manager form of government and operates its own library, public works, and parks and recreation department. Fire and police protection are contracted out to other regional government agencies. The city is home to several technology companies including Siemens Digital Industries Software, along with Stream Global Services, the largest employer in the city. Wilsonville contains many distribution and manufacturing buildings adjacent to Interstate 5, such as regional distribution facilities for Coca-Cola and Rite Aid. Retail centers include Argyle Square on the north and the Town Center Shopping Center to the south. Media in Wilsonville consists of the Portland area broadcast stations, regional newspapers, and the local Wilsonville Spokesman newspaper.

== History ==
Alphonso Boone, the grandson of Daniel Boone, settled in what would later become Wilsonville in 1846 and established the Boones Ferry across the Willamette River in 1847. The ferry gave rise to the community of Boones Landing, which eventually grew into Wilsonville. Originally, the area was part of what became Yamhill County, but was transferred to the current Clackamas County in 1855. The first post office was established in 1876 with the name Boones Ferry.

Wilsonville became the name of the community on June 3, 1880, named after the first postmaster, Charles Wilson. That same year the first school, Wilsonville Grade School, was opened as a single-room building. By 1890, the railroad had reached town and the community contained depot, several hotels, a saloon, a tavern, a bank, and several other commercial establishments. In 1897, the twelve school districts in the vicinity of Wilsonville up to Lake Oswego merged to create a single district. A railroad bridge was built across the river for the Oregon Electric Railway beginning in 1906. The bridge was completed the next year and service from Wilsonville south to Salem began in 1908.

A new Methodist church was built in the community in 1910, which was used until 1988 and is still standing. Two years later, a new two-room school replaced the old one-room school, which in turn was replaced by a modern school in the mid 1900s, all on the same property. In 1939, the wooden trestle part of the railroad bridge across the Willamette caught fire and burned. Boones Ferry was decommissioned after the Boone Bridge opened in 1954 carrying what was then the Baldock Freeway, and is today Interstate 5.

In 1961, the Dammasch State Hospital mental hospital opened on the west side of the community. Gordon House, the only house in Oregon to be designed by architect Frank Lloyd Wright, was built in 1963 near what became Charbonneau and moved to the Oregon Garden in 2001. Wilsonville was flooded in 1964 and the first fire station was built in 1966. Wilsonville was incorporated as a city on October 10, 1968, with a population of about 1,000. In 1971, the planned community of Charbonneau on the south side of the river was annexed into the city the year after development began.

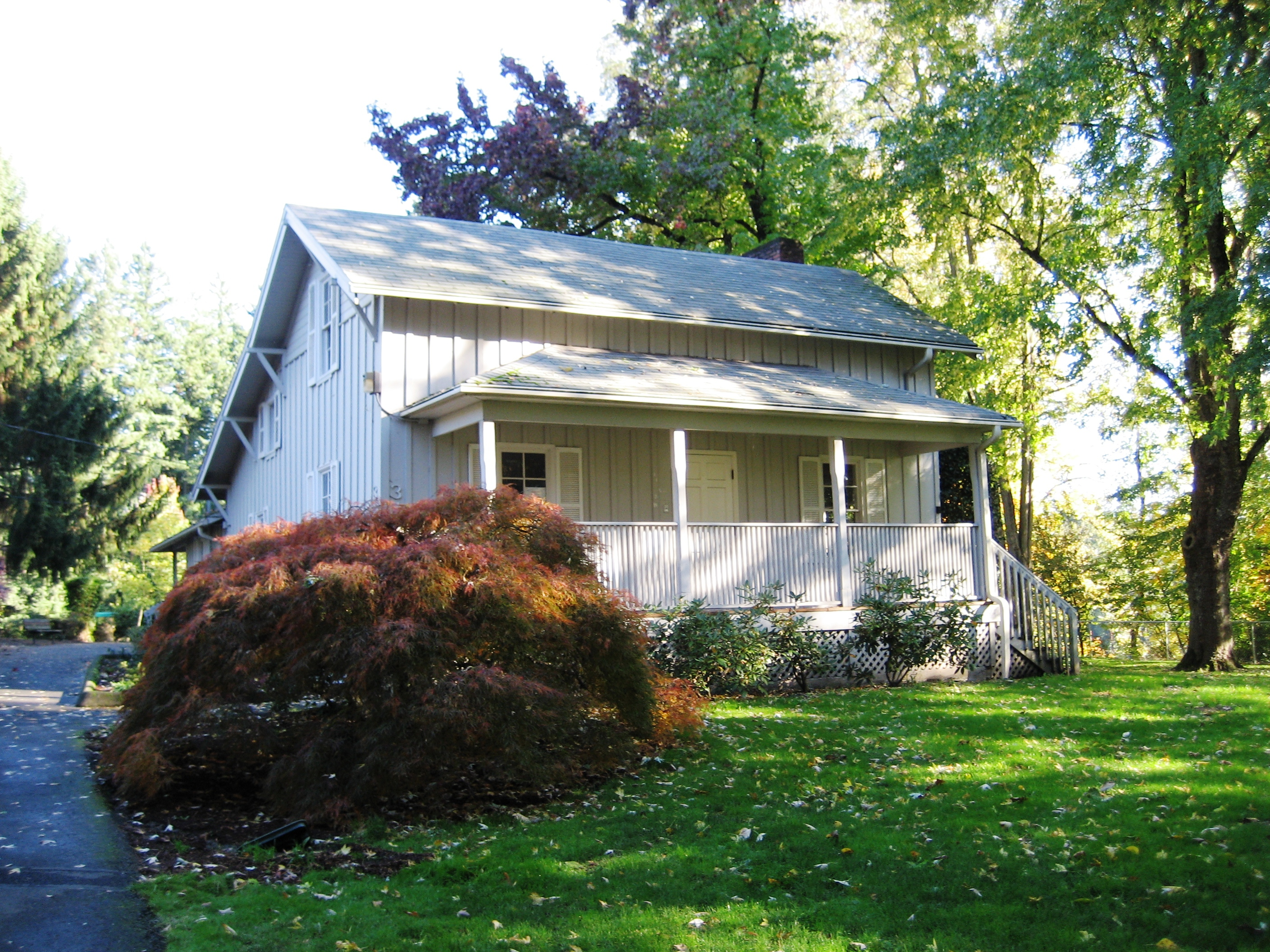
Tauchman House at Boones Ferry Park

Tektronix built a campus in the city beginning in 1973, which was later sold to Xerox. The following year Wilsonville's city hall relocated from Tauchman House at what is now Boones Ferry Park to a trailer and the next year the first city manager was hired. A standalone post office was built in 1976 at Boones Ferry and Wilsonville roads, with city police protection added in 1979. In 1980, the city reached a population of 2,920, and in 1982 the library was opened. The next year, a new city hall was opened, replacing a trailer that had served as city hall since 1975.

At the end of 1988, the city withdrew from the TriMet regional transit district and created its own transit system, now known as South Metro Area Regional Transit, to provide substitute transit service. In 1988, the city opened its first library building, which replaced the one-room library located in space leased from the school district. The population grew to 7,106 at the 1990 census, and in 1991 the Town Center Shopping Center along Wilsonville Road opened. Due to growth in the West Linn-Wilsonville School District, the school board approved building a new high school to be located in Wilsonville in 1992.

Author Walt Morey owned an estate in Wilsonville and after his death in 1992, his widow sold the property to a developer. The housing development built on that property, Morey's Landing, bears his name as does the children's section of the Wilsonville Public Library. Walt Morey Park, a bear-themed park located in Morey's Landing, contains a life-size 8-foot-tall wooden statue of Morey's most famous literary creation, Gentle Ben.

Living Enrichment Center, a New Thought Church with as many as 3,000 members, was headquartered in Wilsonville from 1992 until 2004. The church closed that year after problems that including money laundering by the church leaders led to the bankrupting of the church.

In 1995, Dammasch State Hospital was closed by the state of Oregon, and the site was then proposed as a location for what became the Coffee Creek Correctional Facility, which opened in 2001 at a different site to the north of the old hospital grounds. In protest of the construction of the prison, specifically the effect on property values, Larry Eaton began erecting school buses on his property. The former grounds of the state hospital have been redeveloped as Villebois, a primarily residential planned community. Also in 1995, Wilsonville High School opened as part of the West Linn-Wilsonville School District, the first high school in the city's history. In 1998, lack of an adequate long-term water supply forced the city to suspend adding any new developments to the city. A new water treatment plant on the Willamette River opened in 2002 to address this need.

The Wilsonville Public Library was expanded to nearly four times the size of the 7,500-square-foot (700 m^{2}) 1988 building with an expansion finished in 2002. Wilsonville Primary School was closed in June 2001, and later sold with the property and turned into a shopping center, anchored by an Albertsons supermarket. In September 2006, Wilsonville opened a new $9.9 million, two-story brick and steel city hall after a controversy concerning its location led to unsuccessful attempts to recall several elected officials in the city, including the mayor. In 2007, the old city hall building was turned into a new public works and police department.

During the Great Recession, Nike closed its distribution center in Wilsonville, projector maker InFocus moved its headquarters from the city, and retailer G.I. Joe's that was headquartered there went out of business. In 2010, the Oregon Institute of Technology took over the InFocus building to house the school's Portland area campus. A new shopping center named Old Town Square anchored by a Fred Meyer store opened in 2011 along Interstate 5 at Wilsonville Road, which also included a McMenamins location.

Lowrie Primary School in the West Linn-Wilsonville School District opened in 2012 in the Villebois part of the city. The Villebois Community Center in that area was completed in 2013. A fire in March 2019 destroyed 20 homes that were being built in the Villebois area. In 2021, Fry's Electronics closed its store that had opened as Incredible Universe in 1992, while museum World of Speed and the local bowling alley also closed due to the COVID-19 pandemic. In June 2021, the city hit 116 °F (47 °C) on June 28, 2021, during a heatwave, Wilsonville's highest recorded temperature. The only theater in town, a nine-screen Regal Cinemas, closed in July 2023.

== Geography ==
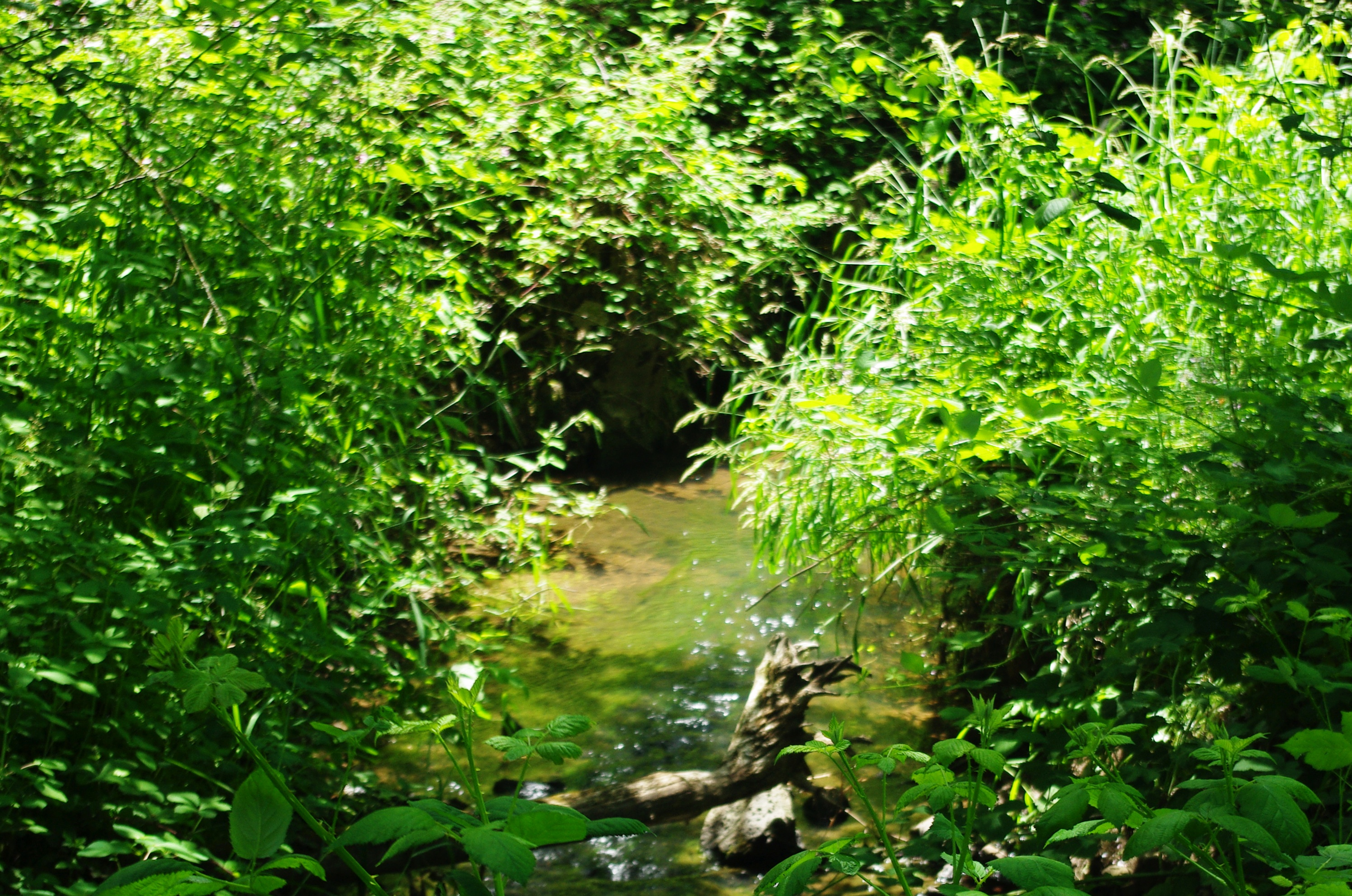
Boeckman Creek in Memorial Park

Wilsonville is located on the southern edge of the Portland metropolitan area, sitting at an elevation of 154 feet (47 m) above sea level. Primarily in the southwestern part of Clackamas County, the northern section is in Washington County. It is located on the north side of the Willamette River around where Alphonse Boone established the Boones Ferry. Neighboring cities are Tualatin on the north, Sherwood to the northwest, and Canby and Aurora to the southeast. Newberg in Yamhill County is approximately 14 miles west along Wilsonville Road. The Willamette separates the majority of the city from Charbonneau, a planned community and neighborhood within the city limits, on the south.

According to the United States Census Bureau, the city has a total area of 7.896 square miles (20.45 km^{2}), of which 7.690 square miles (19.92 km^{2}) is land and 0.206 square miles (0.53 km^{2}) (2.61%) is water. Waterways in addition to the Willamette River include Arrowhead Creek, Meridian Creek, Basalt Creek, Seely Ditch, Boeckman Creek, and Coffee Lake Creek. The Boeckman and Coffee Lake creeks account for 85% of the runoff in Wilsonville. Coffee Lake Creek is on the west side of the city and includes the Coffee Lake Wetlands. The foothills of the Chehalem Mountains lie to the west of Wilsonville, with most land within the city on level ground.

Wilsonville divides the city into 16 neighborhood groups, designated A through P. Within each of these planning areas are individual neighborhoods, and occasionally a neighborhood spans several of these groups. For instance the Villebois development covers areas D through G. Individual neighborhoods include Charbonneau, Wilsonville Meadows, Canyon Creek North, Town Center, RiverGreen, Frog Pond, and Old Town to name a few. Wilsonville's Old Town neighborhood, the oldest of the neighborhoods, is located south of Wilsonville Road along Boones Ferry Road adjacent to the landing of the old Boones Ferry and contains the original portions of the town.

=== Climate ===
Wilsonville, as part of the Willamette Valley is within the Marine west coast climate zone. Summers in Wilsonville are generally warm, but temperatures year-round are moderated by a marine influence from the Pacific Ocean. Wilsonville receives most of its precipitation during the mild to cool winter months, with the wettest period from November through March. July and August are the warmest months with an average high temperature of 87 °F (31 °C), while December is the coolest month with an average low of 34 °F (1 °C). December is also on average the wettest month with 6.67 inches (169 mm). The highest recorded temperature, 116 °F (47 °C), occurred June 28, 2021, during a record breaking heatwave throughout the Pacific Northwest. Wilsonville's lowest recorded temperature was −15 °F (−26 °C) on December 23, 1998.

Climate data for Wilsonville, Oregon
Month	Jan	Feb	Mar	Apr	May	Jun	Jul	Aug	Sep	Oct	Nov	Dec	Year
Record high °F (°C)	65 (18)	72 (22)	78 (26)	87 (31)	101 (38)	116 (47)	104 (40)	105 (41)	105 (41)	95 (35)	72 (22)	67 (19)	116 (47)
Mean daily maximum °F (°C)	48 (9)	52 (11)	57 (14)	61 (16)	68 (20)	74 (23)	81 (27)	82 (28)	76 (24)	64 (18)	53 (12)	46 (8)	64 (18)
Mean daily minimum °F (°C)	36 (2)	36 (2)	39 (4)	42 (6)	47 (8)	52 (11)	55 (13)	55 (13)	51 (11)	44 (7)	40 (4)	34 (1)	44 (7)
Record low °F (°C)	8 (−13)	8 (−13)	20 (−7)	19 (−7)	29 (−2)	34 (1)	41 (5)	37 (3)	30 (−1)	25 (−4)	14 (−10)	−15 (−26)	−15 (−26)
Average precipitation inches (mm)	6.17 (157)	4.74 (120)	4.55 (116)	3.24 (82)	2.52 (64)	1.86 (47)	0.60 (15)	0.64 (16)	1.54 (39)	3.58 (91)	6.56 (167)	6.62 (168)	42.62 (1,083)
Source: The Weather Channel

== Demographics ==
Historical population
Census	Pop.	Note	%±
1970	1,001		—
1980	2,920		191.7%
1990	7,106		143.4%
2000	13,991		96.9%
2010	19,509		39.4%
2020	26,664		36.7%
2024 (est.)	27,895		4.6%
U.S. Decennial Census; 2020 Census

The city has a significant population of families that use Wilsonville as a halfway point between jobs in different cities, mainly Salem and Portland. Wilsonville incorporated with an estimated 1,000 residents in 1969 and grew to 2,920 people at the 1980 Census. Part of the population count includes inmates at the Coffee Creek Correctional Facility that opened in the city in 2001.

According to realtor website Zillow, the average price of a home as of July 31, 2025, in Wilsonville is $633,480.

As of the 2023 American Community Survey, there are 10,347 estimated households in Wilsonville with an average of 2.41 persons per household. The city has a median household income of $87,371. Approximately 8.8% of the city's population lives at or below the poverty line. Wilsonville has an estimated 63.9% employment rate, with 44.5% of the population holding a bachelor's degree or higher and 95.0% holding a high school diploma.

The top five reported languages (people were allowed to report up to two languages, thus the figures will generally add to more than 100%) were English (85.7%), Spanish (8.7%), Indo-European (2.2%), Asian and Pacific Islander (1.8%), and Other (1.6%).

=== Racial and ethnic composition ===
Wilsonville, Oregon – racial and ethnic composition Note: the US Census treats Hispanic/Latino as an ethnic category. This table excludes Latinos from the racial categories and assigns them to a separate category. Hispanics/Latinos may be of any race.
Race / ethnicity (NH = non-Hispanic)	Pop. 1990	Pop. 2000	Pop. 2010	Pop. 2020	% 1990	% 2000	% 2010	% 2020
White alone (NH)	6,760	12,230	15,487	19,475	95.13%	87.41%	79.38%	73.04%
Black or African American alone (NH)	24	90	271	405	0.34%	0.64%	1.39%	1.52%
Native American or Alaska Native alone (NH)	59	82	147	192	0.83%	0.59%	0.75%	0.72%
Asian alone (NH)	101	305	732	1,314	1.42%	2.18%	3.75%	4.93%
Pacific Islander alone (NH)	—	23	78	102	—	0.16%	0.40%	0.38%
Other race alone (NH)	2	13	18	96	0.03%	0.09%	0.09%	0.36%
Mixed race or multiracial (NH)	—	277	416	1,473	—	1.98%	2.13%	5.52%
Hispanic or Latino (any race)	160	971	2,360	3,607	2.25%	6.94%	12.10%	13.53%
Total	7,106	13,991	19,509	26,664	100.00%	100.00%	100.00%	100.00%

=== 2020 census ===
As of the 2020 census, Wilsonville had a population of 26,664 and a median age of 37.9 years. 20.2% of residents were under the age of 18 and 17.2% of residents were 65 years of age or older. For every 100 females there were 89.0 males, and for every 100 females age 18 and over there were 84.8 males age 18 and over.

100.0% of residents lived in urban areas, while 0% lived in rural areas.

There were 10,599 households in Wilsonville, of which 28.6% had children under the age of 18 living in them. Of all households, 47.3% were married-couple households, 17.0% were households with a male householder and no spouse or partner present, and 27.4% were households with a female householder and no spouse or partner present. About 28.9% of all households were made up of individuals and 12.6% had someone living alone who was 65 years of age or older.

There were 11,128 housing units, of which 4.8% were vacant. Among occupied housing units, 49.4% were owner-occupied and 50.6% were renter-occupied. The homeowner vacancy rate was 1.1% and the rental vacancy rate was 5.1%.

Racial composition as of the 2020 census
Race	Number	Percent
White	20,317	76.2%
Black or African American	419	1.6%
American Indian and Alaska Native	296	1.1%
Asian	1,338	5.0%
Native Hawaiian and Other Pacific Islander	103	0.4%
Some other race	1,605	6.0%
Two or more races	2,586	9.7%
Hispanic or Latino (of any race)	3,607	13.5%

=== 2010 census ===
As of the 2010 census, there were 19,509 people, 7,859 households, and 4,658 families residing in the city. The population density was 2,707.33 inhabitants per square mile (1,045.3/km^{2}). There were 8,487 housing units at an average density of 1,177.77 per square mile (454.7/km^{2}). The racial makeup of the city was 85.31% White, 1.52% African American, 0.97% Native American, 3.82% Asian, 0.44% Pacific Islander, 4.76% from some other races and 3.18% from two or more races. Hispanic or Latino people of any race were 12.10% of the population.

=== 2000 census ===
As of the 2000 census, there were 13,991 people, 5,937 households, and 3,775 families residing in the city. The population density was 2,085.41 inhabitants per square mile (805.2/km^{2}). There were 6,407 housing units at an average density of 954.99 per square mile (368.7/km^{2}). The racial makeup of the city was 90.45% White, 0.66% African American, 0.70% Native American, 2.22% Asian, 0.16% Pacific Islander, 3.15% from some other races and 2.65% from two or more races. Hispanic or Latino people of any race were 6.94% of the population.

There are 5,937 households out of which 30.4% have children under the age of 18 living with them, 51.5% are married couples living together, 8.3% have a female householder with no husband present, and 36.4% are non-families. 28.3% of all households are made up of individuals and 9.7% have someone living alone who is 65 years of age or older. The average household size is 2.34 and the average family size is 2.89.

In the city the population is spread out with 24.6% under the age of 18, 9.4% from 18 to 24, 31.4% from 25 to 44, 20.2% from 45 to 64, and 14.4% who are 65 years of age or older. The median age is 35 years. For every 100 females there are 94.5 males. For every 100 females age 18 and over, there are 91.7 males.

The median income for a household in the city is $52,515, and the median income for a family is $65,172. Males have a median income of $43,480 versus $28,395 for females. The per capita income for the city is $29,786. 5.6% of the population and 3.0% of families are below the poverty line. Out of the total people living in poverty, 3.7% are under the age of 18 and 8.2% are 65 or older.

== Economy ==
Wilsonville has often had more jobs in the city than residents due to its location along Interstate 5. This location has led to the city becoming headquarters for several major local and national companies, as well as home to facilities of several national companies. Companies with their headquarters in the city include design software maker Mentor Graphics and imaging systems manufacturer FLIR Systems.

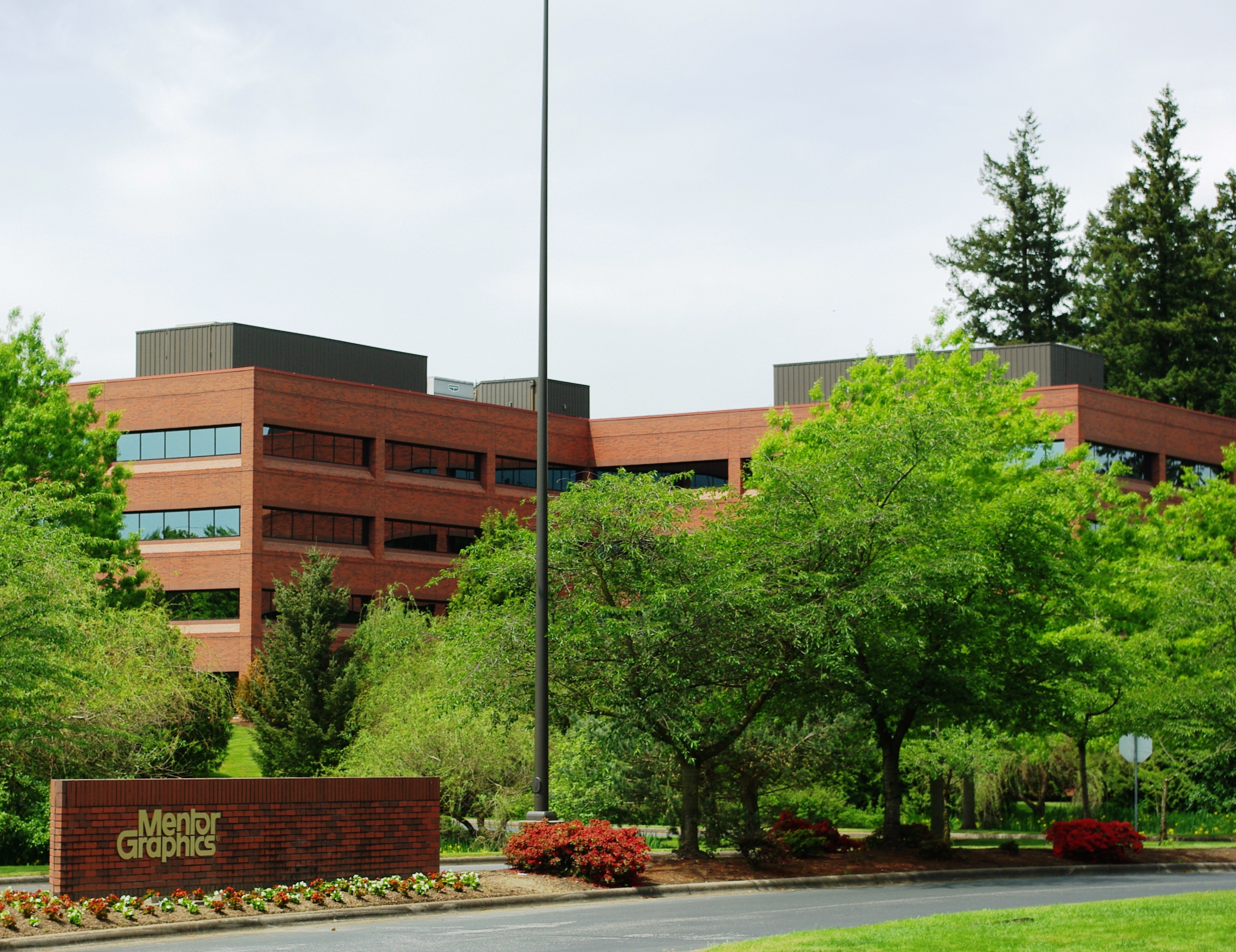
Mentor Graphics headquarters

Copier and printer manufacturer Xerox operates a large facility in Wilsonville, and is the city's largest employer. The company acquired the color printing and imaging division of Tektronix corporation in 2000. Xerox, Mentor Graphics, and FLIR are all adjacent to each other north of Boeckman Road along Parkway Avenue. InFocus and Mentor were both founded by former employees of Tektronix.

Wilsonville is home to many other business located in industrial parks straddling Interstate 5 that are filled with manufacturing and distribution facilities. Xerox and Mentor Graphics are the city's two largest employers as of 2006, the only two to employ more than 1000 people. Other large employers in the city are Tyco Electronics (Precision Interconnect), Sysco, Rockwell Collins, and Rite Aid. Additionally, Coca-Cola operates a bottling plant in the city.

Retail in Wilsonville is concentrated mainly along Wilsonville Road near the Interstate 5 interchange. This includes the Town Center Shopping Center and related developments along Town Center Loop, which included Fry's Electronics, one of the former largest employers in the city, which closed in 2021. Microsoft had a plant, producing the Surface Hub, from 2015 to mid-2017, with the loss of 124 jobs.

=== Top employers ===
According to the city's 2024 Annual Comprehensive Financial Report, the largest employers in the city are:

Number	Employer	Type of Business	Number of employees	Percentage
1	Siemens Mentor Graphics Corporation	CAD software systems	1,014	5.9%
2	Coca Cola Bottling Company	Bottling & distribution center	613	3.6%
3	Collins Aerospace	Aerospace technology	527	3.1%
4	Sysco Food Services of Portland Inc.	Warehouse & distribution center	499	2.9%
5	Columbia Distributing	Warehouse & distribution center	400	2.3%
6	Costco Wholesale	Wholesale retail	329	1.9%
7	TE Connectivity	Consumer electronics company	299	1.7%
8	Twist Bioscience Corporation	Synthetic biology company	282	1.6%
9	Fred Meyer	Grocer	247	1.4%
10	Energy Storage Systems Inc.	Energy storage technology	247	1.4%
—	Total	—	4,457	26.1%

== Culture ==
Media in Wilsonville consists of the 28 radio stations and 7 television stations broadcast in the Portland media market, regional newspapers such as The Oregonian, and the local paper, the Wilsonville Spokesman. The Spokesman is published once a week on Wednesdays and has a circulation of 3,176. There was a single movie theater operated by Regal Cinemas, operated from 1996 to 2023, which featured the first stadium style seating in the Northwest.

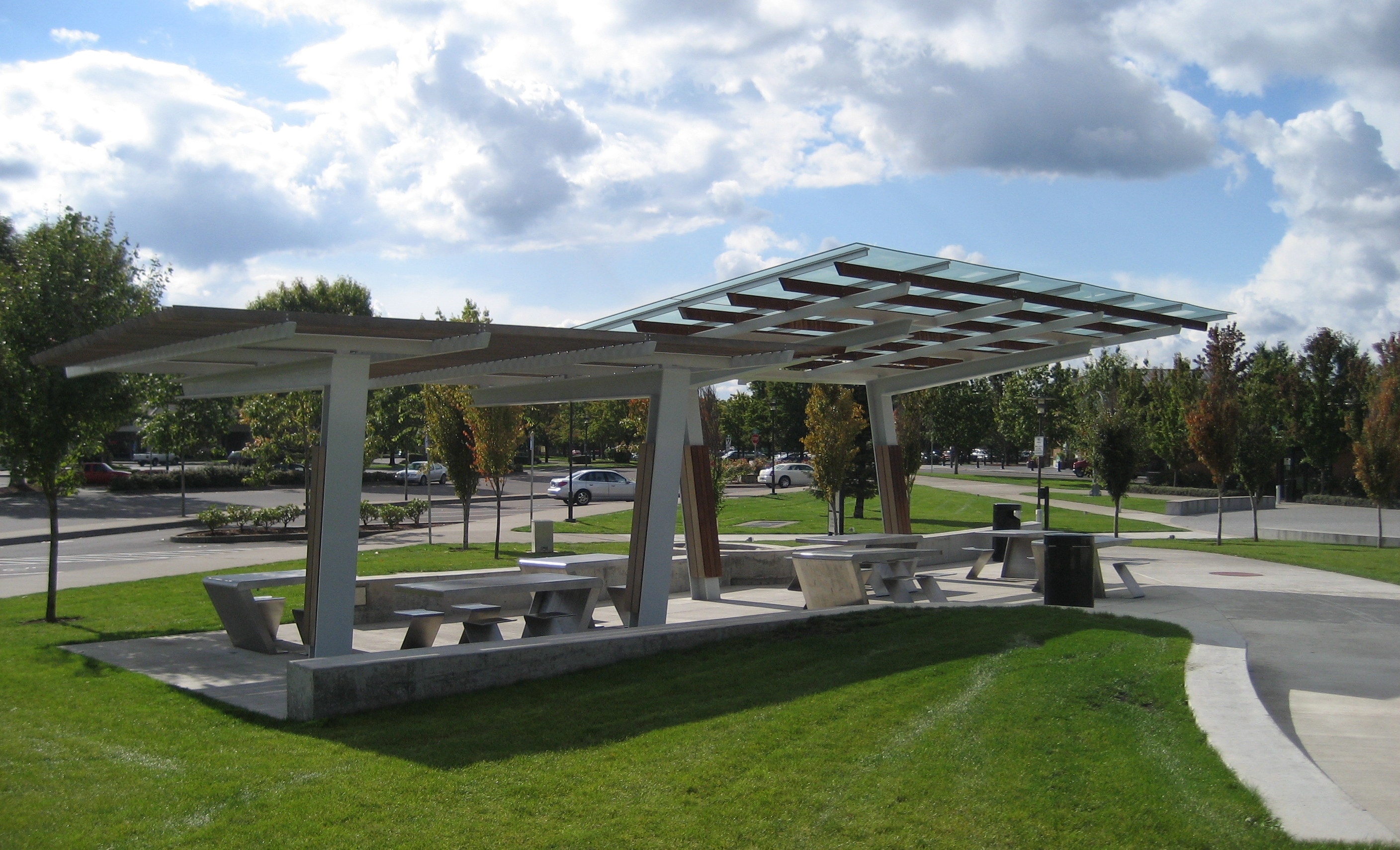
Town Center Park picnic shelter

Wilsonville Public Library, founded in 1982, is a member of Library Information Network of Clackamas County and had an annual circulation of 493,000 in 2006 to 2007. The library is located adjacent to Wilsonville Memorial Park, the largest and oldest of the city's 12 parks. Memorial Park includes a water feature, athletic fields, and the Stein-Boozier Barn used as meeting space, among other amenities. Town Center Park also has a water feature along with a visitor center operated by the Clackamas County and the Oregon Korean War Memorial. Other parks in the city are River Fox Park, Park at Merryfield, Montebello Park, Hathaway Park, Courtside Park, Tranquil Park, Willamette River Water Treatment Plant Park, Willow Creek/Landover Park, Canyon Creek Park, and Boones Ferry Park located on the Willamette River at the landing for the defunct Boones Ferry.

The Wilsonville Community Center holds classes and community programs as well as community meeting space. Wilsonville holds an annual arts fair each May called the Wilsonville Festival of Arts. Another annual event, Wilsonville Celebration Days, started in 2000 and replaced Boones Ferry Days. A farmers' market started in 2009 at the Villebois development, held on Thursdays from May into October. Charbonneau Golf Club is the only golf course in the city, with Langdon Farms and Sandelie just to the south and east respectively. Wilsonville also is along the Willamette Greenway series of open spaces and trails. Wilsonville is the setting for the 2008 film Wendy and Lucy.

== Government ==
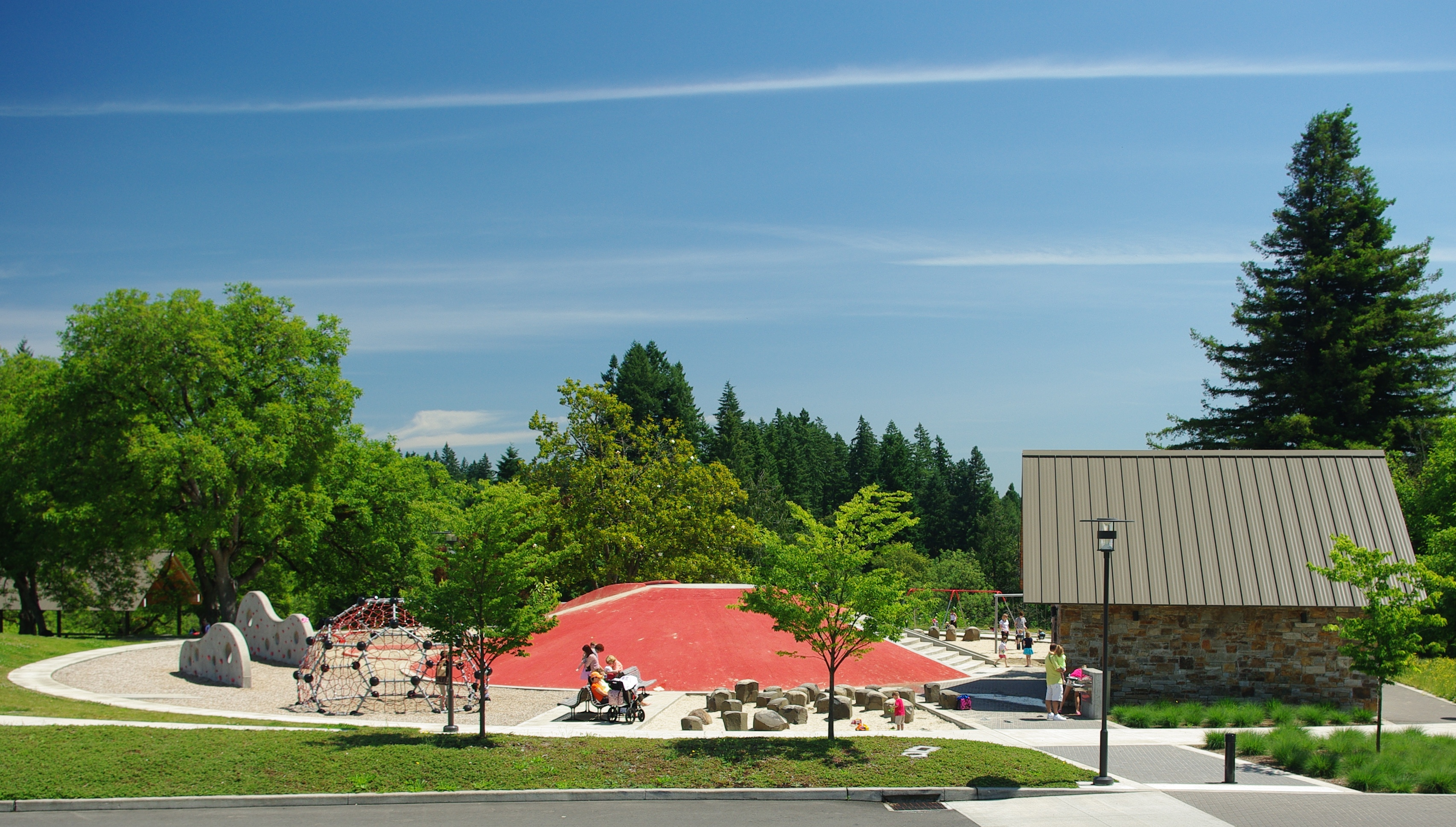
Play area at Murase Plaza in Memorial Park

Wilsonville has a home rule charter and is a council-manager governed municipality where the unelected city manager runs day-to-day operations. The current city manager is Bryan Cosgrove. The mayor and four-person city council are elected to four-year terms. As of 2025, Wilsonville's elected officials are Shawn M. O'Neil (Mayor), Caroline Berry (Council President), Katie Dunwell, Anne Shevlin, and Adam Cunningham

Fire protection and police protection are contracted to other area governmental agencies. Fire services are provided by Tualatin Valley Fire & Rescue, and that agency operates two fire stations in the city. Police service is contracted out to the Clackamas County Sheriff's Office, with a captain serving as the chief of police and officers using vehicles marked as Wilsonville Police. The city's Parks and Recreation Department runs 12 parks, with Memorial Park the largest at 126 acres (51 ha).

Wilsonville also provides its own water supply and wastewater treatment. The wastewater system was built in 1972, while the water system was upgraded with a new treatment plant in 2002. Water is drawn from the Willamette River from the Wilsonville Water Treatment Plant built at a cost of $46 million in conjunction with the Tualatin Valley Water District. The city used to use wells to provide drinking water, but those began to run dry in the late 1990s. The plant's initial capacity was 15 million gallons per day, but can be expanded to 120 million gallons per day. Neighboring Sherwood began receiving water from the plant in 2012.

The city has a single library branch, a 28,677-square-foot (2,664.2 m^{2}) building on Wilsonville Road. The majority of the city is within the West Linn-Wilsonville School District, but the Charbonneau area is part of the Canby School District. Public transit is provided by the city through South Metro Area Regional Transit (SMART), which has ten routes that serve Wilsonville and connect to other cities. It has connections to the regional TriMet system, which includes the Westside Express Service commuter rail that terminates in the city.

At the federal level, Wilsonville lies within Oregon's 6th congressional district, represented by Andrea Salinas. In the State Senate, the city is in District 13, represented by Aaron Woods. In the House, the city is represented by Courtney Neron Misslin in House District 26. In addition, Wilsonville lies within District 3 (represented by Gerritt Rosenthal) of the Metro regional government.

== Education ==
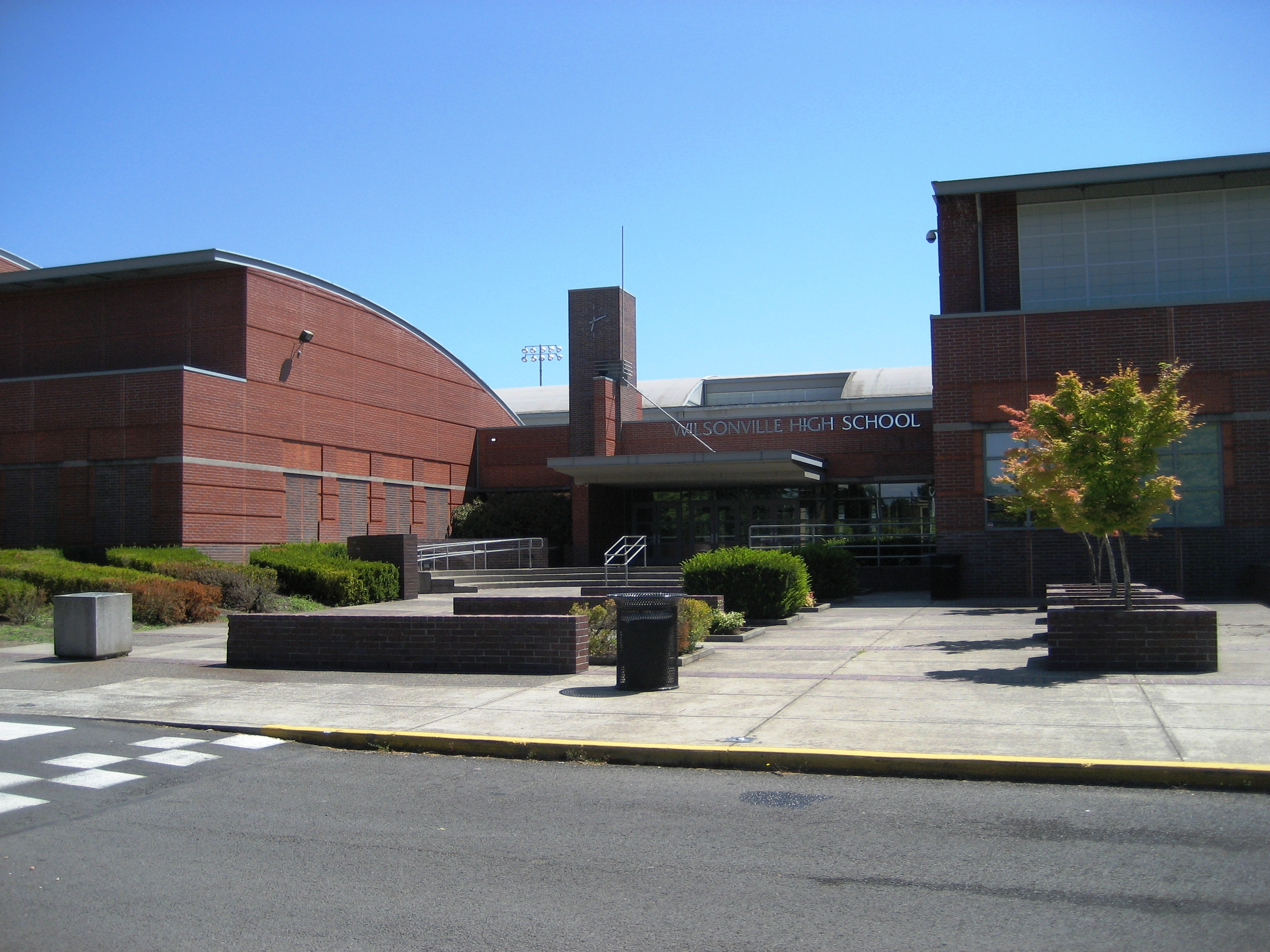
Wilsonville High School entrance

Most of Wilsonville is in the West Linn-Wilsonville School District, however portions south of the Willamette River are within the Canby School District and areas just to the west lie within the Sherwood School District.

Elementary school (or Primary school as the district refers to it) education in the city includes Boeckman Creek, Boones Ferry, Lowrie, and Stafford Primary Schools. These schools serve grades K–5. A new primary school, named Frog Pond, is under construction and will open in the fall of 2025 on Boeckman Road.

Students living in the boundaries of Boeckman Creek and Lowrie Primary schools attend Inza Wood Middle School and the students living in the boundaries of Boeckman Creek, Frog Pond, and Stafford attend Meridian Creek Middle School. Students at Stafford are given a choice between Meridian Creek and Athey Creek Middle School in West Linn.

All students living in Wilsonville attend Wilsonville High School. They can also choose to enroll at Riverside High School, a smaller open-enrollment school with International Baccalaureate classes.

Students in the boundaries for the Canby School District attend Howard Eccles Elementary for grades K–6, Baker Prairie Middle for grades 7–8, and Canby High School for grades 9–12. Students in the boundaries for the Sherwood School District attend Hawks View Elementary for grades K–5, Sherwood Middle School for grades 6–8, and Sherwood High School for grades 9–12.

The city is also in the Clackamas Community College district and has a satellite campus on Town Center Loop. Opened in 1992, the campus was originally known as the Oregon Advanced Technology Center. The Oregon Institute of Technology operates its Portland area campus in the city along Interstate 5. The private, for-profit Pioneer Pacific College operated their main campus in the city until 2020.

== Transportation ==
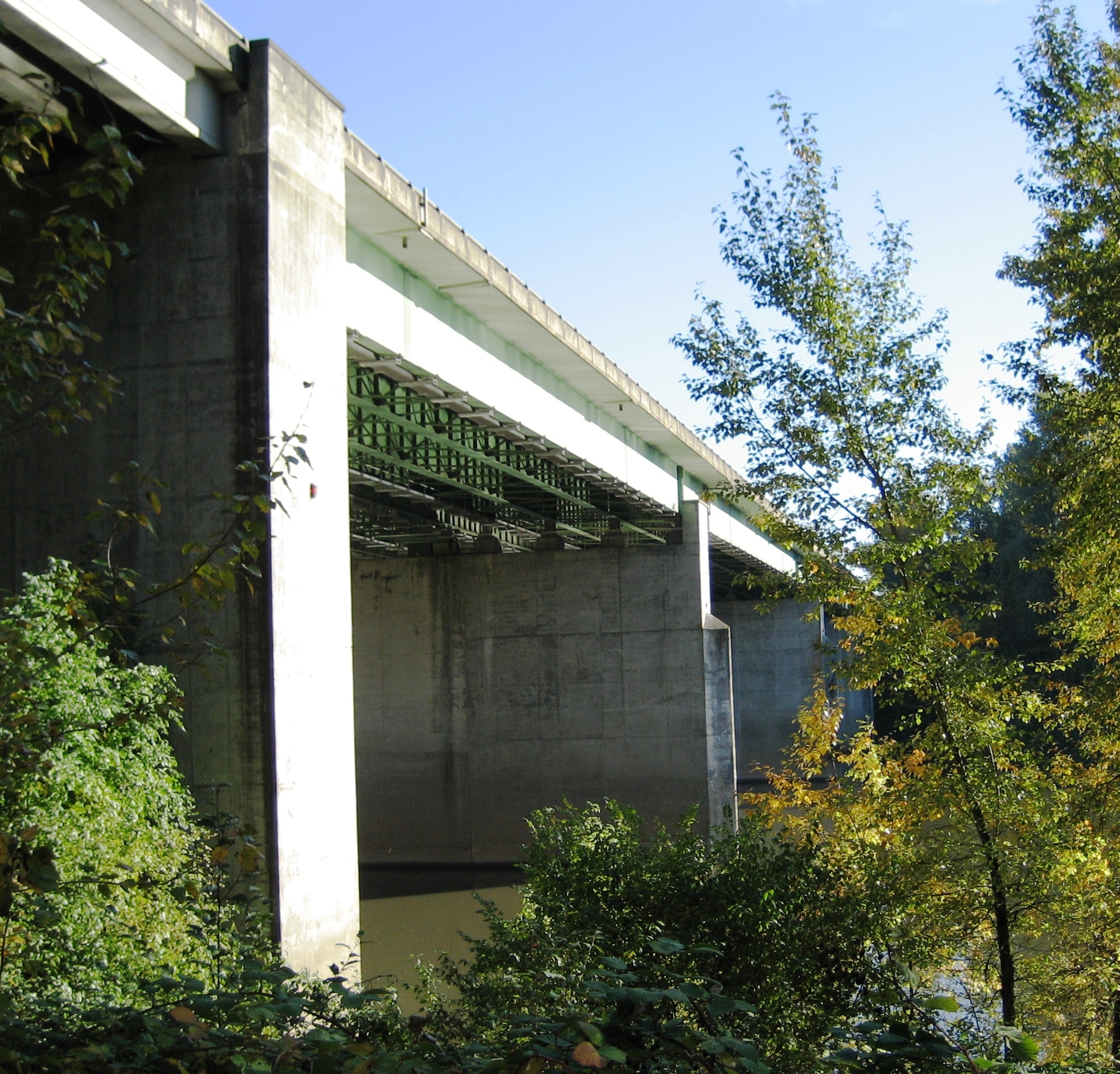
Boone Bridge

Interstate 5 runs north-south through the middle of the city and crosses the Willamette River on the Boone Bridge. Wilsonville has two interchanges with the freeway north of the river, at Wilsonville Road on the south and where Boones Ferry Road meets Elligsen Road on the north end of town. To the south of the river, the Charbonneau interchange crosses I-5 at the southern limit of the city. Boeckman Road is the only other street that crosses I-5 and links the western and eastern parts of Wilsonville. Wilsonville Road, 95th Avenue, Boones Ferry Road (northern portion is Oregon Route 141), Boeckman Road, Town Center Loop, French Prairie Drive, Elligsen Road, Parkway Avenue, and Stafford Road are the main roads in the city.

Transit service used to be provided by TriMet, but the city decided to opt out and now operates South Metro Area Regional Transit (SMART). SMART has connections with Salem's transit service, Canby's transit service, and TriMet. The Westside Express Service (WES), a commuter rail line to Beaverton, began operations in February 2009. Wilsonville Station is the southern terminus of the nearly 15-mile (24 km) line operated by TriMet, and the station is the hub for SMART services.

Freight rail service is provided by the Portland and Western Railroad over the same tracks as WES, with connections to BNSF Railway. These tracks run north-south and cross the Willamette over the Portland and Western Railroad Bridge. The city does not have an airport, with Aurora State Airport to the south as the closest public field and Portland International Airport 17 miles north as the closest commercial airport. Although located along the river, there are not any port facilities, though there is a marina located on the east bank (south side) of the Willamette.

== Notable people ==
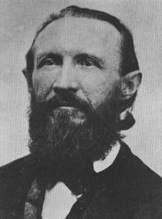
Former territorial governor George Law Curry

The city has been home to a variety of notable people ranging from politicians to athletes and authors. Famous politicians to call Wilsonville home include former governor George Law Curry, Congresswoman Edith Green, federal judge James M. Burns, and former mayor and state representative Jerry Krummel. Athletes of note have included football player Derek Devine, professional golfer Brian Henninger, and baseball player and manager Del Baker. Those prominent in the legal field are Gordon Sloan, and R. William Riggs. Others include children's author Walt Morey, businessman Tom Bruggere, baseball coach Mel Krause and actor Frank Cady. Actor Henry Thomas is a current resident of Wilsonville, having moved there in 2014.

== Sister city ==
Wilsonville has one sister city relationship. The city established a relationship with Kitakata, in the Fukushima province of Japan, in 1988. Kitakata, in the northern part of Honshū, has an estimated population of 55,000. Then-Wilsonville Mayor Jerry Krummel visited Japan in 1994 to attend a ceremony honoring Kitakata's 40th birthday. The mayor of Kitakata visited Wilsonville in 2008 to celebrate the twentieth anniversary of the relationship.

== See also ==
- List of ghost towns in Oregon – Boones Ferry was a ghost town subsumed by Wilsonville
