= Wilsonville railroad bridge =

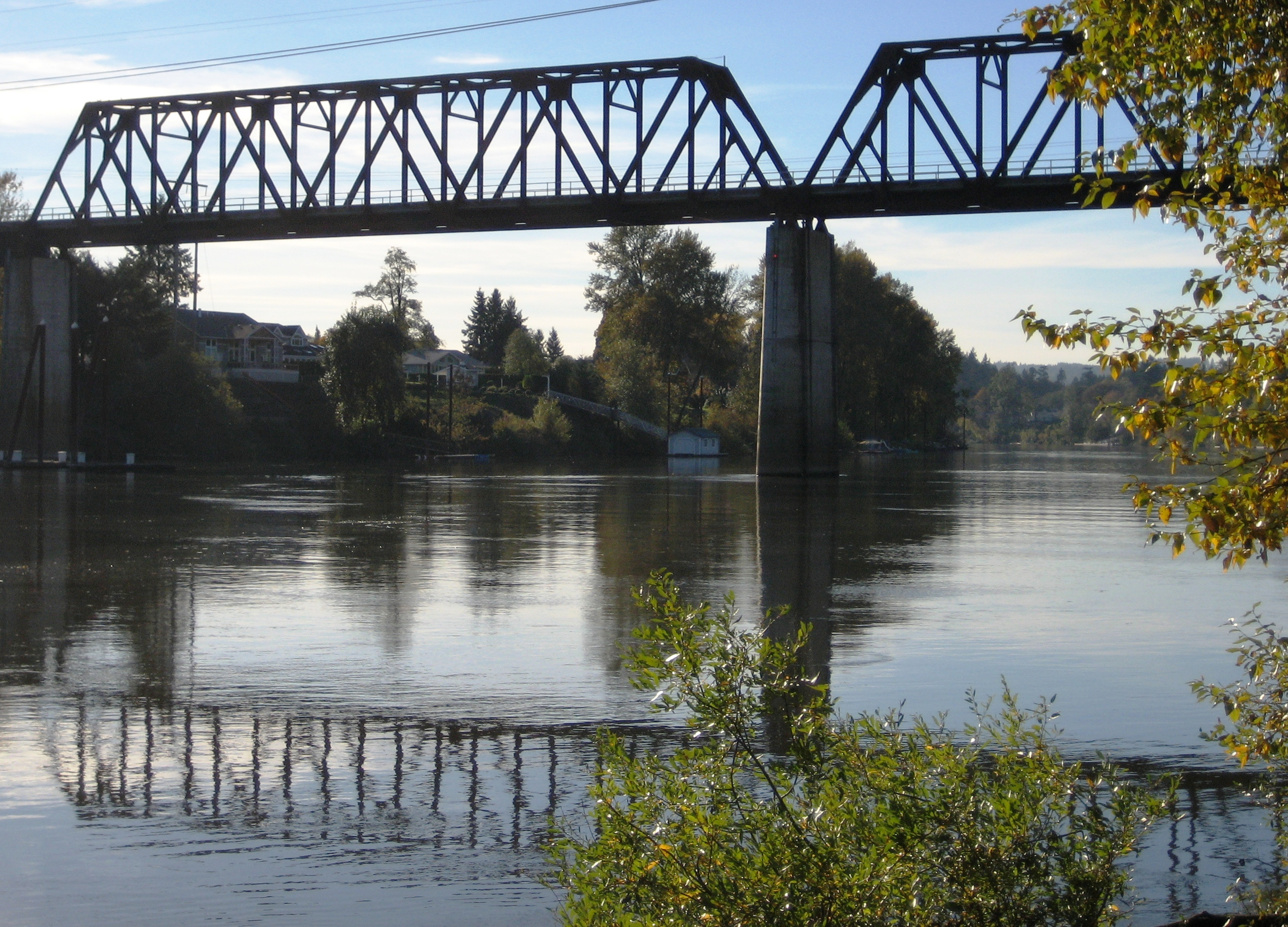
- Coordinates: 45.292928°N 122.776487°W
- Carries: Portland and Western Railroad
- Crosses: Willamette River
- Locale: Wilsonville, Oregon
- Maintained by: Portland and Western Railroad

Characteristics
- Design: Thru truss bridge
- Total length: 1,220 feet (370 m)
- Longest span: 500 feet (150 m)

History
- Opened: 1975

Location
- Interactive map of Wilsonville railroad bridge

The Wilsonville railroad bridge is a steel truss bridge that crosses the Willamette River at Wilsonville, Oregon, United States. This 1,220-foot-long (370 m) structure was finished in 1975 to replace a 1907 bridge at the same location and carries rail traffic for the Portland and Western Railroad. The original bridge was built to carry the Oregon Electric Railway across the river near the Boones Ferry.

== History ==
The first bridge was built in 1907 for the Oregon Electric Railway line that ran from Eugene to Portland. That bridge was a steel, 2,430-foot (740 m) long structure slightly downriver from the Boones Ferry crossing at a section of the Willamette that runs east-west between Canby and Newberg. Known as the Oregon Electric Wilsonville Bridge, the bridge had a southern approach consisting of a wooden trestle measuring more than 2,600 feet (790 m) in length. This trestle caught fire in July 1939.

In 1954, the ferry was discontinued when the Boone Bridge opened to carry U.S. Route 99, now Interstate 5. Ownership of the rail bridge passed to the Spokane, Portland and Seattle Railway in 1910, and in 1970 it became part of the new Burlington Northern Railroad (BN).

In 1972, initial plans for a new bridge were approved by the Coast Guard and construction began on August 1, 1973. Hensel Phelps Construction Company built the new bridge for Burlington Northern, which included constructing new piers in the river. The bridge was completed in July 1975, and opened for rail traffic on August 6, 1975. The rail line was leased to Portland and Western in 1995, which they then bought the tracks in 1997. The land and bridges underneath the tracks of the line were donated to the state by Burlington Northern in 1998.

== Details ==
Located upstream from the old ferry landings, the bridge is at river mile 38.8. Built of two steel thru trusses each 250 feet (76 m) long, the total span is 1,220 feet (370 m) long. This type of truss allowed the new bridge to sit lower than the previous bridge, as the bridge's structure sat above the tracks, whereas the old bridge's girders were located below the track level, and thus the entire bridge needed to be higher in order to allow river traffic to pass. The old bridge stood 120 feet (37 m) tall.

The structure is supported by four concrete piers in the river, three piers on land, and two abutments. Carrying a single track on a concrete deck, the bridge includes six 120-foot-long (37 m) deck girder spans used on the approaches. The black-colored bridge was designed and built by Hensel Phelps Construction. Constructed of weathering steel, the bridge superstructure is oxidized, which prevents rust. It also means the bridge does not need to be painted.
