= Derek Devine =

American football player (born 1984)

No. 3
- Position: Quarterback

Personal information
- Born: July 19, 1984 (age 42); Wilsonville, Oregon, U.S.
- Listed height: 6 ft 3 in (1.91 m)
- Listed weight: 222 lb (101 kg)

Career information
- High school: Canby (Canby, Oregon)
- College: Mt. San Antonio (2003–2004); Marshall (2005–2006)
- NFL draft: 2007: undrafted

Career history
- Seattle Seahawks (2007)*; Calgary Stampeders (2007)*; Washington Redskins (2008)*; Virginia Destroyers (2011–2012)
- * Offseason or practice squad member only

Awards and highlights
- UFL champion (2011)

Derek Devine (born July 19, 1984) is an American former football quarterback. He was signed by the Seattle Seahawks as an undrafted free agent in 2007. In high school, he played at Canby High School in Oregon. Devine then played college football at Mt. San Antonio and Marshall.

== Professional career ==
Devine was signed by the Virginia Destroyers of the United Football League on May 9, 2011.
