= George Law Curry =

American politician and journalist (1820–1878)

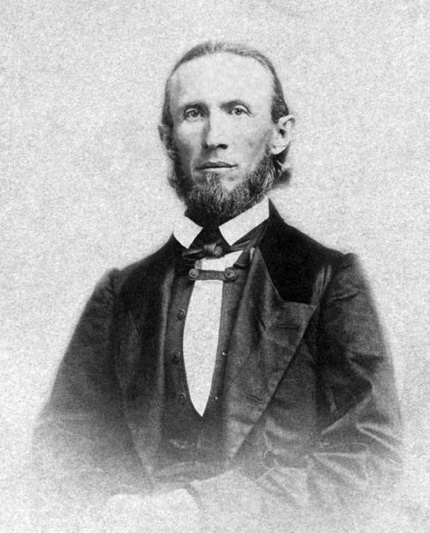
- George Law Curry (1860s)

Acting Governor of Oregon Territory
- In office May 19, 1853 – December 2, 1853
- Preceded by: Joseph Lane as Acting Territorial Governor
- Succeeded by: John Wesley Davis as Territorial Governor

5th Governor of Oregon Territory
- In office August 1, 1854 – March 3, 1859
- Preceded by: John Wesley Davis
- Succeeded by: John Whiteaker as State Governor

Secretary of the Oregon Territory
- In office May 14, 1853 – January 27, 1855
- Preceded by: Edward D. Hamilton
- Succeeded by: Benjamin F. Harding

Personal details
- Born: July 2, 1820 Philadelphia, Pennsylvania, U.S.
- Died: July 28, 1878 (aged 58) Portland, Oregon, U.S.
- Party: Democratic
- Spouse: Chloe Boone
- Occupation: Politician; Newspaper Publisher; Jeweler

George Law Curry (July 2, 1820 – July 28, 1878) was a predominant American political figure and newspaper publisher in the region that eventually became the state of Oregon. A native of Pennsylvania, he published a newspaper in St. Louis, Missouri, before traveling the Oregon Trail to the unorganized Oregon Country. A Democrat, Curry served in the new Oregon Territory's government as a representative to the legislature and as Territorial Secretary before appointment as the last Governor of the Oregon Territory. Curry County in Southern Oregon is named in his honor.

== Early life ==
Curry was born in Philadelphia, Pennsylvania, on July 2, 1820, to Mr. and Mrs. George Curry. Though he received little formal education, he became well-read and educated through self-study. He also spent some of his childhood in Caracas, Venezuela. In 1831, he began a long career in the newspaper business when he started working in Boston as an apprentice printer. Curry moved west to Missouri where he published the newspaper The Reveille in St. Louis from 1842 to 1845.

== Oregon ==
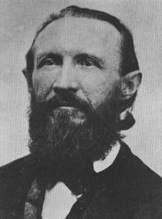
Curry in 1853

In 1846, he emigrated overland to the unorganized Oregon Country and settled in Oregon City. Once in Oregon, Curry's experience in the newspaper business landed him a job editing the Oregon Spectator, an early newspaper owned by George Abernethy. Abernethy's views that politics should be kept out of the Spectator led Curry to resign from the paper after only a year and a half. Curry's belief that this policy was censorship put him at odds with the paper's management. In 1848, he set up the Oregon Free Press in Oregon City in competition with his former employer, the same year as the creation of the Oregon Territory. The newspaper soon failed as the California Gold Rush temporarily drained the territory of people and advertisers.

At the second session of the Oregon Territorial Legislature held from 1850 to 1851, he worked as the chief clerk of the lower chamber House of Representatives. In the 1851 to 1852 session he served in the House representing Clackamas County. Curry next served as the Secretary of the Oregon Territory from 1853 to 1854, with the office as the first in line to succession to the Governor.

Twice he stepped in as Acting Territorial Governor: May 19, 1853 – December 2, 1853; upon Acting Governor Joseph Lane's return to Congress and for six months in 1854, upon the resignation of John W. Davis. U.S. President Franklin Pierce then officially appointed Curry to the position, which he held until Oregon Statehood in 1859. As a prominent local man, Curry was received much more favorably by the population, whereas most of his predecessors were seen as outsiders from the East Coast. During the Yakima War in 1855, Governor Curry raised a force of 2,500 volunteers and led them into battle in support of federal troops.

Oregon prepared for statehood under Governor Curry, approving a state constitution and electing John Whiteaker as the first Governor of the State of Oregon in 1857. On February 14, 1859, Congress passed the Oregon Statehood Bill, and President James Buchanan signed it, creating Oregon as the thirty-third state of the Union. Upon this act, Curry's position was abolished.

== Later life and family ==
Curry married Chloe Donnelly Boone in 1848, the daughter of ferry operator Alphonso Boone. Alphonso operated Boones Ferry and was the grandson of Daniel Boone. Curry and Chloe had five children. After leaving office, Curry attempted an 1860 run for the United States Senate, losing by one vote in the State Legislature.

He served as editor of the Portland Advertiser from 1861 to 1862, followed by editing Portland's Evening Journal in 1876. He also returned to making jewelry, and settled in Boone's Landing (now Wilsonville). George Law Curry died on July 28, 1878, at the age of 58 and was buried at Lone Fir Cemetery in Portland. Curry County in Southern Oregon was created in 1855 while he was in office and was named in his honor.

Preceded by Joseph Lane; Acting Territorial Governor	Acting Governor of Oregon Territory; 1853	Succeeded by John W. Davis; Territorial Governor
Preceded by John W. Davis; Territorial Governor	Governor of Oregon Territory; 1854–1859	Succeeded by John Whiteaker state Governor
