= Wilsonville Public Library =

Public library in Wilsonville, Oregon

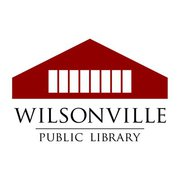
- 45.3025°N 122.76128°W
- Location: Wilsonville, Oregon
- Established: 1982

Collection
- Size: 155,000

Access and use
- Circulation: 515,000
- Population served: 22,000
- Members: 17,000

Other information
- Budget: $1.3 million
- Director: Shasta Sasser
- Website: wilsonvillelibrary.org

The Wilsonville Public Library (WPL) is the single-location public library of the city of Wilsonville, Oregon. Established in 1982, the library moved to its present location near Wilsonville Memorial Park in 1988. The WPL is a part of the Library Information Network of Clackamas County and serves a population of about 21,900. The library has approximately 155,000 items in its collection with a total circulation of approximately 515,000 items.

== History ==
Wilsonville was incorporated in 1969, and dedicated a library in February 1982. Prior to 1982, the county provided library services via a bookmobile. Phila Simmons served as the first librarian of Wilsonville's public library. At that time, the library was located on the grounds of the old Wilsonville Grade School on Boones Ferry Road owned by what was then the West Linn School District .

Wilsonville residents approved a measure in June 1987 that provided $2,225,000 for the city to build a library building and buy 41.5 acres (16.8 ha) to add to Wilsonville Memorial Park. In December of that year, the city started construction on a new library building to be built over 2 acres (0.81 ha) in the northwest corner of the park. William L. Lonigan General Contractors Inc. built the new library, designed by Nagao & Oroyan Associates, for a contract price of approximately $760,000. Part of the funding came from a $96,000 federal grant, and the new building was expected to handle the city's growth for 15 years. The library was also designed to be expanded.

The new library's design was 7,000 square feet (650 m^{2}) and included a conference room, children's area, and a large meeting room. While the library was under construction, the city commissioned a sculpture of author Walt Morey, to be paid for by the Friends of the Wilsonville Library. The 3-foot (0.91 m) bronze figure cost $7,500 and honored the Wilsonville-area resident who wrote novels such as Gentle Ben. The children's room was also named after the author and includes a bronze plaque. Wilsonville's new library building opened on August 23, 1988, at a cost of about $900,000. The statue was dedicated on December 18, 1988.

In 1990, Steve Turner was hired as the library's new director, replacing Phila Simmons. Local employer Fujimi America Inc. donated approximately 1,500 Japanese books to the library in May 1991. The library started opening on Sundays in 1994, but only during the school year, after Clackamas County passed a library operating levy.

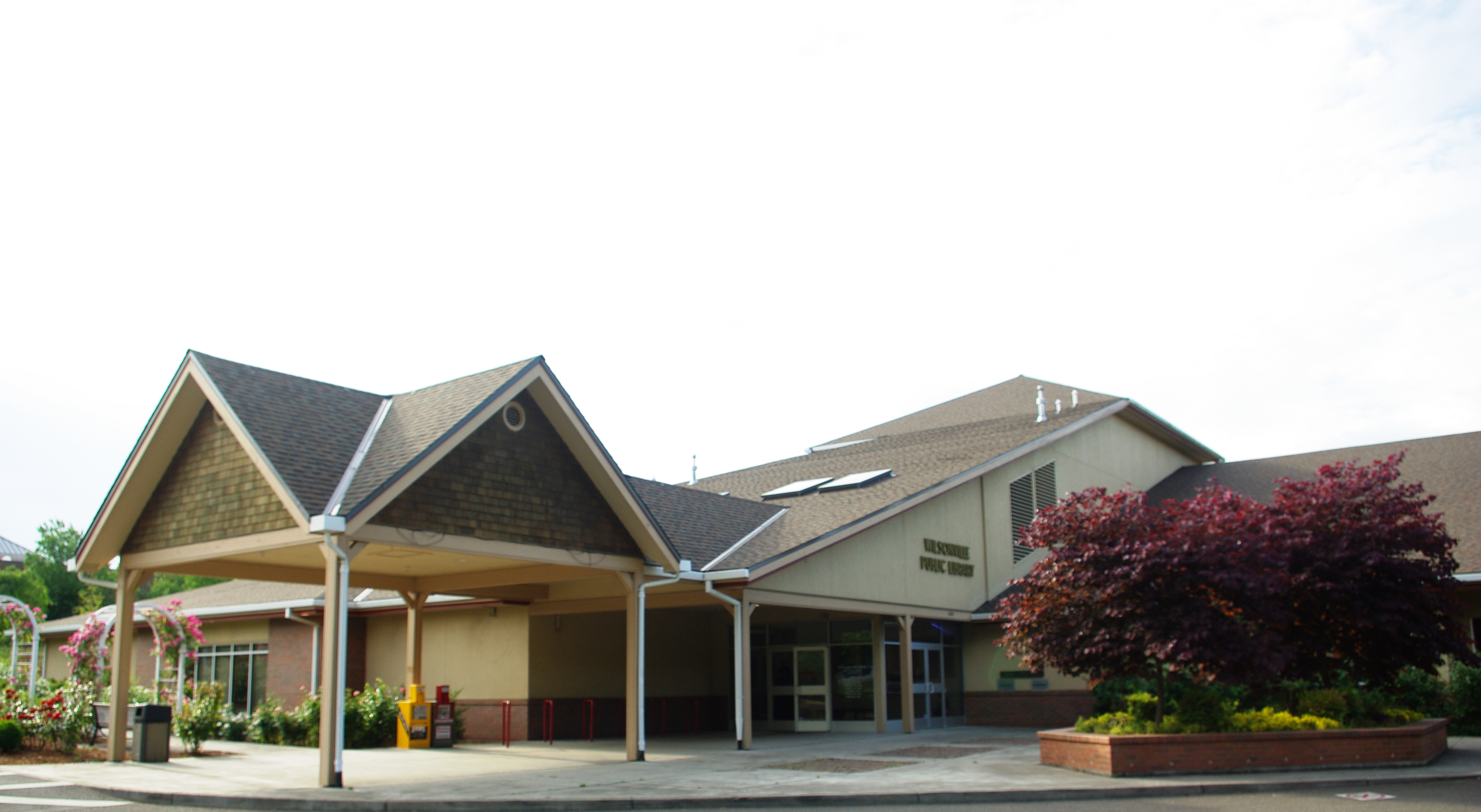
Exterior of the library

Wilsonville sent a bond measure to their voters in September 1995 for $3.9 million to be used to expand the library building, which at the time held 35,000 books. Voters rejected the measure, along with a measure to improve Memorial Park. In 1998, the library started offering passes to cultural institutions in the Portland metropolitan area. In November 2000, the city called on its voters again with a $4 million measure designed to expand the library fourfold, and this time around the measure passed. In August 2001, construction began on the expansion, designed by Rich Turi, which was scheduled for completion in March 2002. Both InFocus and OrePac Building Products donated equipment for use in the expanded facility.

Starting in 2002 the library offered story time in Spanish for children and brought in Claudia Renata Osorio in 2005 in an attempt to increase the number of people attending the sessions. The Wilsonville Public Library Foundation paid for a 35-foot (11 m) ceramic mural in the children's area of the library, which was added in 2004. On December 21, 2003, Patrick Duke replaced Steve Turner as the library's third director.

The Library Foundation attempted a fundraiser in 2005 where participants paid for a tour of homes that used a line of paint from Devine Color. The city's attempt to raise property taxes in November 2006 was defeated by voters, which led to cuts in the library's operating hours. The library received a $10,000 grant in 2008 to expand its outreach program at the Coffee Creek Correctional Facility, a women's prison in Wilsonville. The grant allowed for additional training and books for the program, entitled Book Bridges, designed to build and strengthen the connection between infants and their mothers who are serving time in prison. Also in 2008, the library's Storytime Collection was chosen by the Oregon State Library as one of the outstanding projects of the year.

== Facilities and services ==
The 28,677-square-foot (2,664.2 m^{2}) building houses a variety of collections, as well as 19 computers. One of the larger collections is the children's collection, which has its own room that opens onto an exterior patio. Two other rooms also open to the patio. Other features of the building include tile in the highly traveled portions, blue-heather carpet elsewhere, and wood accents on the walls and ceilings. The main entrance leads to the grand foyer that has a high ceiling and skylights, and is home to the library's reference desk.

Another collection at the library is the Heritage Collection, which focuses on the history and genealogy of Oregon and southwestern Washington state. The collection includes U.S. Census records, biographies, vital records, local histories, and online databases, among other items. The collection also includes exhibits sponsored by the Wilsonville-Boones Ferry Historical Society, including models of sternwheelers and a photographic mural of the city from about 1910.

=== Circulation ===
As of 2011 the library had an annual budget of $1.3 million, which included $166,000 spent on the collection to serve a population of about 22,000. At that time the collection had 155,000 items, of which 102,000 were print items, nearly 11,000 were video items, almost 11,000 were audio items, plus 166 periodical subscriptions. The library had approximately 17,000 registered patrons and an annual circulation of 514,706 in 2011, which included about 178,000 items loaned out to other libraries. As of 2011, WPL had an attendance of 24,406 at its 353 children's programs over the course of the fiscal year.
