= West Linn Public Library =

Oregon Information Centre

- 45.367559°N 122.614052°W
- Location: West Linn, Oregon
- Established: 1939

Collection
- Size: 101,795

Access and use
- Circulation: 409,176
- Population served: 30,213
- Members: 15,160

Other information
- Budget: $2.7 million
- Director: Doug Erickson
- Website: www.westlinnlibrary.org

The West Linn Public Library serves the community of West Linn, Oregon. The library is part of the Library Information Network of Clackamas County (LINCC), a consortium of 13 public libraries in Clackamas County.

== History ==
The library opened on March 1, 1939, with a collection of 300 books. It was located on the second floor of the city hall building (which has since become the police station). Lucille Warren and Neva Teague were hired through the National Youth Administration to run the library.

In 1965 city officials made plans for a new 7,000-square-foot $120,000 library building on city-owned property at West A Street and Willamette Falls Drive. Phillip R. Balsiger of Wilsonville was retained as architect. To supplement a $40,000 federal grant issued through the state library board, an $85,000 general obligation bond issue was put on the March 30 ballot. It included $5,000 for the purchase of books and periodicals for the new library. It was voted down by a vote of 152-108 out of approximately 2,500 eligible voters. The City Council put it back on the ballot for the May 28 election that same year, but it was voted down 434–247.

In 1977 the library's collection consisted of 12,800 books and magazines and the second floor of City Hall was too small to accommodate the collection. 25 volunteers packed up 14,000 books on October 28, 1978, and the library moved into the community room of the Bolton Fire Station.

By 1987 the library had outgrown the 1,500-square-foot space at the fire station. Since the library had moved to the fire station the collection had more than tripled and there were five times as many card holders. Boxes of books were stored in the attic. Many library programs had to be held in the engine bay with the fire trucks moved outside.

On March 31, 1987, voters approved a $1.2 million bond proposal to finance construction of a dedicated library building. The library also received a $95,543 federal Library Services Construction Act grant. A list of 22 possible sites was narrowed down to three until the West Linn City Council approved a resolution authorizing the purchase of a 1.5-acre piece of land on Burns Street in April 1988. The new 10,000 square foot library, which was designed by SRG Partnership, opened on Burns Street in December 1989.

In 1999 a $3.9 million bond measure to remodel and expand the library did not pass on the November 2 ballot because voter turnout was less than 50%. The following year on the May 16 ballot the bond measure passed. In June 2001 the library moved into temporary quarters at Bolton Primary School and construction began on the library expansion, which was again designed by SRG Partnership. In June 2002 the newly expanded 28,000 square foot building re-opened to the public.

== Facilities and services ==
The library features two public meeting rooms, an art gallery, public computer lab, and wi-fi throughout the building. The library collection includes print and online resources, including over 100,000 materials in a wide variety of formats.

The library offers educational, recreational, and cultural programs including storytimes for kids, monthly programs for teens, summer reading programs for all ages, book clubs, and classes. In the 2019-2020 fiscal year the library offered 530 events, classes, and programs.

The library building was closed to the public March 2020 through March 2021 due to the COVID-19 pandemic.

=== Circulation ===
The West Linn Public Library has 15,160 registered borrowers. In the 2019-2020 fiscal year patrons checked out 409,176 items, and reference librarians answered more than 5,376 reference and research questions.
