= Alphonso Boone =

American pioneer (1796–1850)

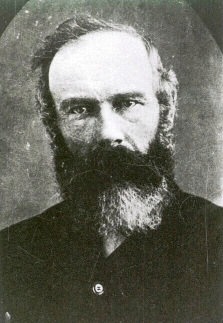
- Born: November 7, 1796; Mason County, Kentucky, U.S.
- Died: February 27, 1850 (aged 53); Butte County, California, U.S.
- Known for: Boone's Ferry
- Spouse: Nancy Linville
- Relatives: Daniel Boone

Alphonso Boone (November 7, 1796 – February 27, 1850) was an American pioneer in what became the state of Oregon. A native of Kentucky, he was the grandson of Daniel Boone, and lived much of his life in Missouri. After immigrating to the Oregon Country, he established Boones Ferry across the Willamette River south of Portland near the present city of Wilsonville.

== Early life ==
Alphonso Boone was born on November 7, 1796, in Mason County, Kentucky, to Jesse Bryan Boone and Chloe Van Bibber. The grandson of famed frontiersman Daniel Boone, he moved to Missouri where he lived in the mid-1820s in Montgomery County. Boone later moved to Jefferson City in Cole County, where he ran a trading post in the 1830s to early 1840s. There he supplied emigrants preparing to cross the Great Plains on the Oregon Trail. He married Nancy Linville, a second cousin, on February 21, 1822, and they had 10 children before her death in early 1839. Boone then moved to Independence in 1841 where he continued outfitting wagon trains.

== Oregon ==
In 1846, Boone packed up his family and started west along the Oregon Trail himself, eventually taking the Southern Route to the Willamette Valley. He started the journey with his brother-in-law Lilburn Boggs, former Missouri governor, but parted ways when Boggs headed for California. After reaching the valley, Boone took up a land claim along the Willamette River on the south bank between Oregon City and Champoeg. In 1847, along with his son Jesse, he established Boones Ferry across the river. The community of Boones Landing began around the north ferry landing, which later became the city of Wilsonville. The road leading to the ferry landing from the north was cleared by the family and became known as Boones Ferry Road, which still exists today. The route and ferry became an important transit point between Salem and Portland.

Alphonso and some of his boys left in 1849 for the California Gold Rush. Alphonso Boone died in California on February 27, 1850, along the Feather River near Oroville in Butte County. His daughter Chloe married neighbor and Oregon Territorial Governor George Law Curry in March 1848. His son Jesse continued to operate the ferry until he was murdered in 1872. The ferry continued in operation until 1954.

== See also ==
- Boone Bridge
