= Boone Bridge (Oregon) =

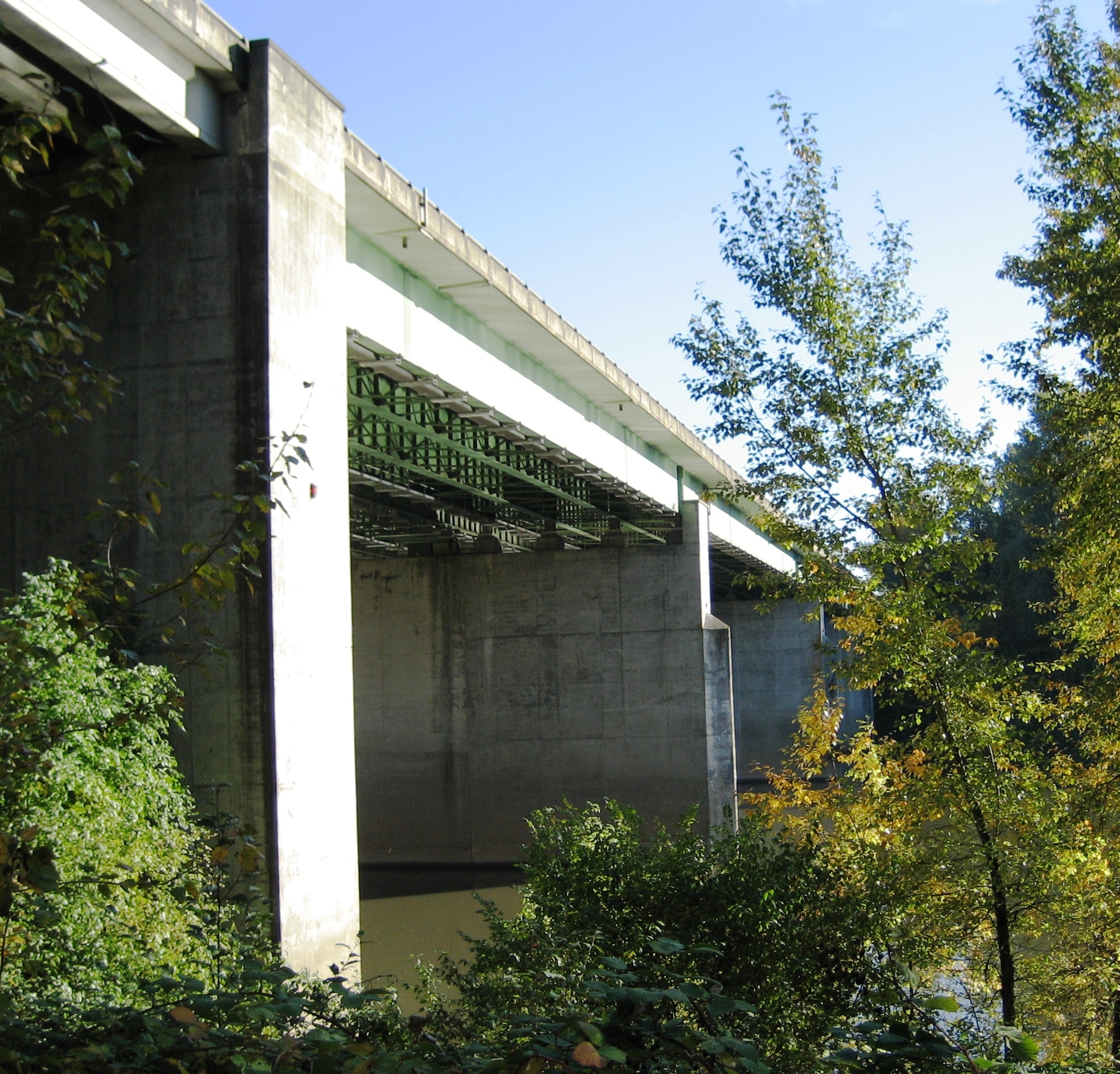
- West side of the bridge from the north bank
- Coordinates: 45.291766°N 122.76932°W
- Carries: I-5
- Crosses: Willamette River
- Locale: Wilsonville, Oregon
- Maintained by: Oregon Department of Transportation

Characteristics
- Design: steel girder floorbeam system
- Total length: 1,111 feet (339 m)
- Width: 116 feet (35 m)
- Clearance below: 75 feet (23 m)

History
- Opened: 1954

Location
- Interactive map of Boone Bridge

Boone Bridge is a steel girder highway bridge over the Willamette River at Wilsonville, Oregon, in the United States. Built in 1954, it crosses the river to the Charbonneau section of Wilsonville, carrying Interstate 5 into the open Willamette Valley from the Portland metropolitan area. Maintained by the Oregon Department of Transportation, the 1,111-foot-long (339 m) bridge has three travel lanes in each direction. To the west is the site of the former Boone's Ferry, which the bridge replaced.

== History ==
Alphonso Boone (grandson of Daniel Boone) and his son Jesse Boone started the Boone's Ferry over the Newberg Pool stretch of the Willamette River in 1847. They also cleared timber and constructed a road south towards Salem and north towards Portland, creating the first overland connection from Salem to the northern section of the Willamette Valley. A railroad bridge was constructed just upriver in 1907 and was used for the Oregon Electric Railway.

In 1953, Oregon began construction of a highway bridge just east of the ferry landings to carry what became Interstate 5. The four-lane, north-south aligned bridge was finished in 1954 and opened to traffic in July, with the ferry ending service at that time. The state named the bridge Boone Bridge in honor of the Boone family. At the time there was a bronze marker in one of the bridge's piers to commemorate the name, but it was removed when the bridge was later widened.

The state widened Boone Bridge from its original four lanes of traffic to a total of six lanes in 1970, with three lanes in each direction. On April 1, 1995, the bridge was re-dedicated as the Boone Bridge and a sign added to the bridge along with a plaque at the nearby rest area to honor the earlier ferry. From 1998 to 1999 the bridge was retrofitted with steel cables and a new roadway in order to prepare the bridge for earthquakes at a cost of $4 million. In May 1999, a ten car accident on the bridge backed up traffic for nine hours. The fatal crash led to a temporary reduction in the speed limit. By 2008, the bridge carried in excess of 131,300 cars per day.

== Details ==
Constructed of steel girders on the underside, the bridge is 1,111 feet (339 m) long. Boone Bridge measures 116 feet (35 m) in width and rises 75 feet (23 m) above the river. The Canby Ferry, which also crosses the Willamette, is a few miles to the east. There is a Portland & Western Railroad rail bridge just upriver, to the west of Boone Bridge.

The bridge is considered a choke point in the regional transportation system with Oregon Route 217 and Interstate 205 funneling traffic onto Interstate 5 to cross the river at the bridge. Oregon transportation officials have proposed several options including a new span, as well as new highway sections to connect Oregon Route 18 directly to Interstate 5 south of the bridge along with extending Interstate 205 south of Oregon City to connect with I-5 at Aurora or Woodburn. Replacing the existing bridge is estimated to cost $48,424,000.

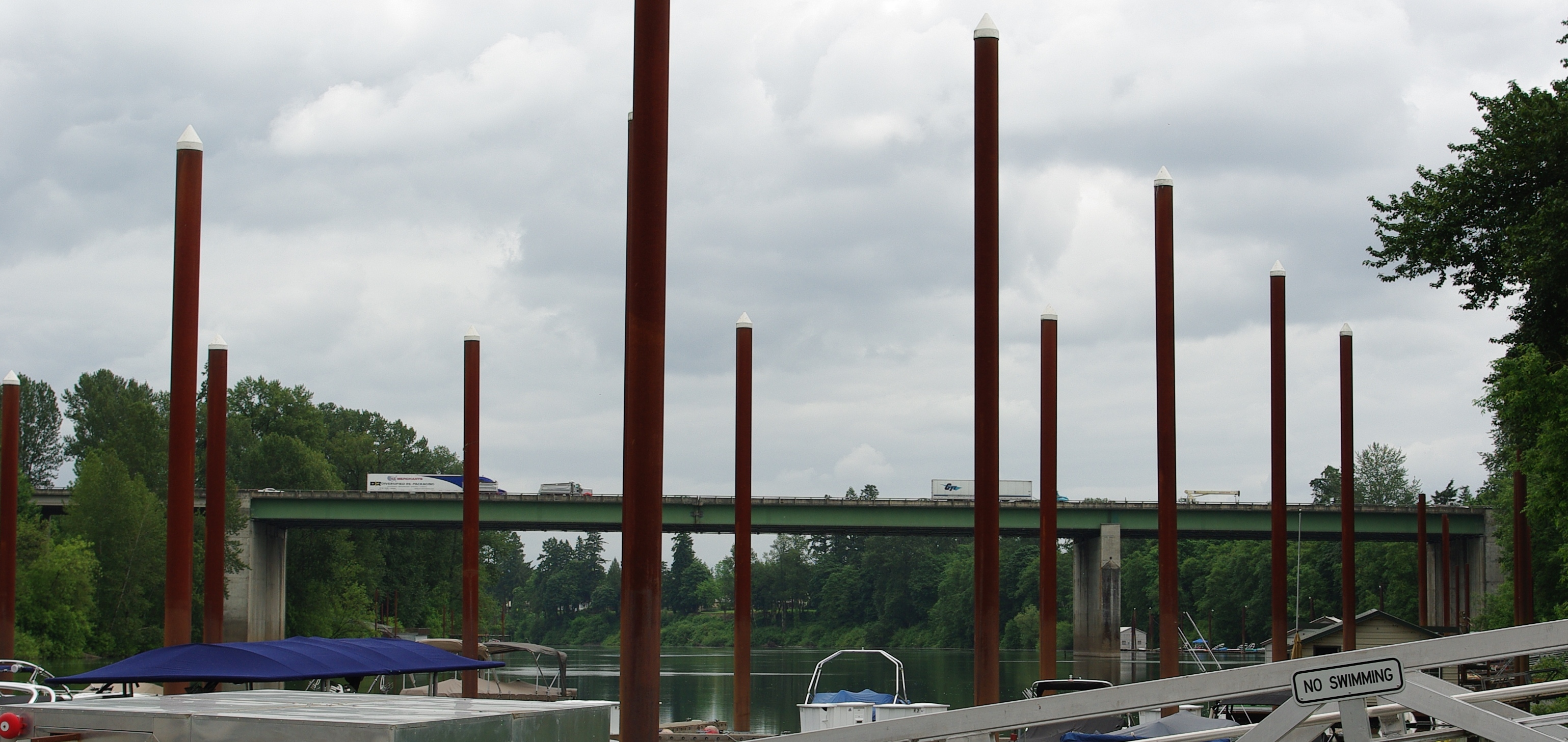
View from west on south bank of river

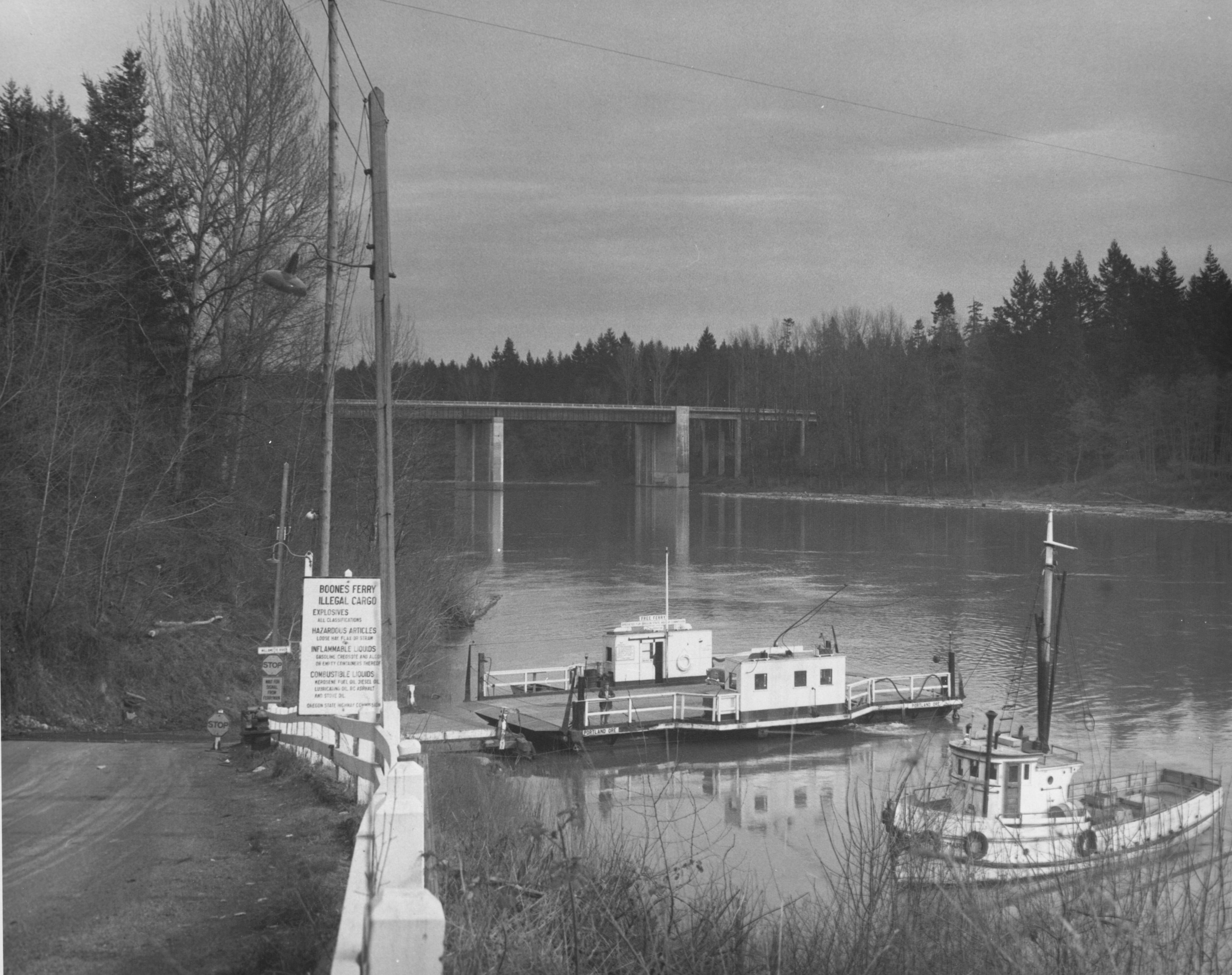
View in the mid-1950s from the soon-to-be-closed landing of the Boone's Ferry

This is the second crossing of the Willamette by Interstate 5, the first being downstream in Portland on the Marquam Bridge.

== See also ==
- List of crossings of the Willamette River
