= Wilsonville High School =

Public high school in Wilsonville, Oregon

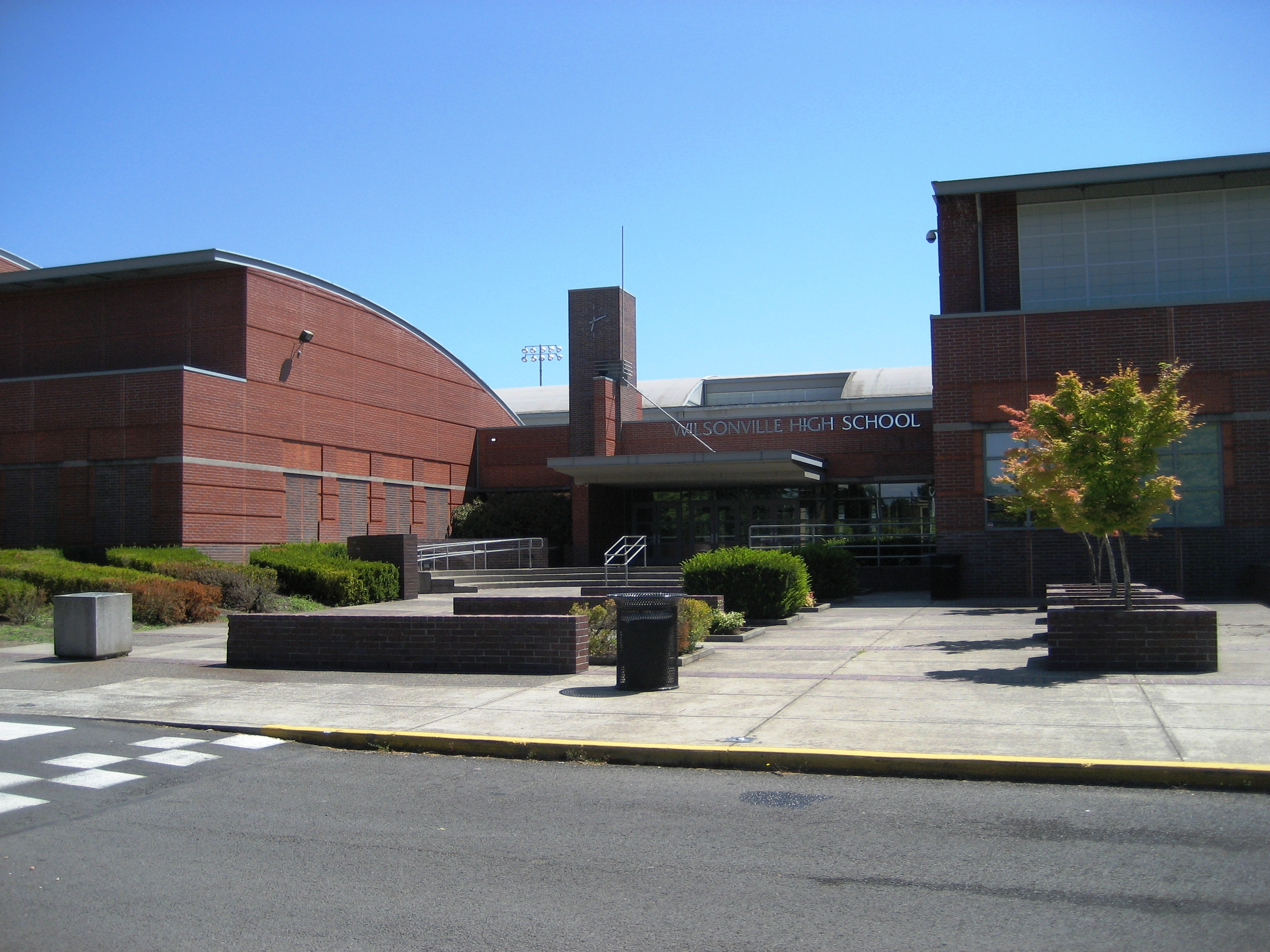

Location
- 6800 SW Wilsonville Rd; Wilsonville, (Clackamas County), Oregon 97070; United States; 45.30773°N 122.746897°W

Information
- Type: Public
- Opened: 1995
- School district: West Linn-Wilsonville School District
- Principal: Jocelyn McIntire
- Teaching staff: 66.09 (FTE)
- Grades: 9-12
- Enrollment: 1,269 (2024-2025)
- Student to teacher ratio: 19.11
- Campus: Suburban
- Colors: Blue and Silver
- Athletics conference: OSAA Northwest Oregon Conference 5A
- Mascot: Wildcat
- Team name: The Wildcats
- Rival: Canby High School
- Newspaper: The Paw Print
- Feeder schools: Meridian Creek Middle School; Inza Wood Middle School
- Website: wilsonvillehs.wlwv.k12.or.us

Wilsonville High School (WVHS) is a four-year suburban, public high school in Wilsonville, Oregon, United States and is part of the West Linn-Wilsonville School District.

== History ==
Wilsonville High School is the first and only high school located in Wilsonville. Prior to its opening in 1995, students residing in the area were required to commute—often by bus—to West Linn in order to attend West Linn High School, or alternatively enroll in high schools in neighboring communities.

At the time of its inauguration, the school was informally referred to as "high tech high", a nickname that reflected its emphasis on technological integration. Contemporary reports highlighted the availability of networked computers in classrooms and the provision of internet access to all students—features that were comparatively uncommon in secondary education at the time.

Until 2023, the school lacked a dedicated and adequately equipped performing arts facility; its existing auditorium was considered insufficient in both size and technical capacity. Following the approval of a district bond measure in 2019, a substantial expansion project—approximately 30,000 square feet—was undertaken. This development included the construction of a new 600-seat auditorium and a black box theater.

Subsequently, the former auditorium space was repurposed to support career and technical education programs. The renovated area now houses facilities such as a wood shop, a robotics laboratory, and additional general-purpose classrooms.

== Academics ==
In 2016, Wilsonville High School received a silver ranking from U.S. News & World Report, and was ranked 7th in the state. Standardized test scores show Wilsonville above the state average in reading, writing, math and science.

In 2024, 95% of the school's seniors received a high school diploma. Of 316 students, 300 graduated, 15 dropped out, and one returned for another year of school.
