= Mel Krause =

Biographical details
- Born: February 4, 1928; Portland, Oregon, U.S.
- Died: June 13, 2008 (aged 80); Wilsonville, Oregon, U.S.

Playing career
- 1948–1951: Oregon
- Position: Shortstop

Coaching career (HC unless noted)
- 1970–1981: Oregon

Head coaching record
- Overall: 218–220–1

Mel Krause (February 4, 1928 – June 13, 2008) was an American college baseball coach and player at the University of Oregon. He also played professional baseball in the Northwest League. Krause also played college basketball for Oregon and coached two different high school basketball teams to Oregon state basketball championships. Prior to its planned reinstatement in 2009, Krause was the last Ducks baseball coach when the university canceled the sport in 1981.

== Early life and playing career ==
Krause grew up in Portland, Oregon. He attended Commerce High School (now Cleveland High School) where he played football, basketball, and baseball and was named to All-City teams in all three sports.

After graduating from high school, Krause attended the University of Oregon, where he played baseball and basketball. He pursued a professional baseball career, playing in the minor-league Northwest League for the Salem Senators from 1954 to 1956 and the Eugene Emeralds from 1957 to 1961.

== Coaching career ==
Following his graduation from Oregon, Krause began coaching high school sports in 1952 at Milwaukie High School in Milwaukie, Oregon. He coached two high school basketball teams to the Oregon state basketball championship: Franklin High School in 1956 and North Eugene High School in 1963. He also coached Sheldon High School's baseball team to a State runner-up finish in 1966.

In 1968 Krause moved to the college coaching ranks when he became the first head coach of the Lane Community College Men's Basketball team. In two seasons at Lane, Mel compiled a 31–13 record (14–6 in 1968–69 and 17–7 in 1969–70). In addition to being the head coach of Men's Basketball, Mel helped the school start a varsity baseball program in 1969. While he was working as an assistant baseball coach to Irv Roth, the inaugural 1969–70 baseball team advanced to the NJCAA Region 18 tournament.

In 1970 Krause was named head baseball coach at Oregon, replacing his former coach, Don Kirsch. In 11 seasons, Krause's teams won two Pacific-8 Conference Northern Division championships (1972 and 1974). In 1981, due to budgetary concerns, the university dropped its baseball program along with several other sports. Krause returned to high school coaching, ending his coaching career at Newberg High School in 1992. Following his coaching career, he worked as a baseball scout for the San Francisco Giants, Philadelphia Phillies and Los Angeles Dodgers.

== Illness and death ==
In November 2007, Krause was diagnosed with acute myeloid leukemia and given two to six months to live. Shortly before his diagnosis, the University of Oregon announced that they would be reinstating baseball for the 2009 season, and subsequently built a new baseball stadium, PK Park, with the main entrance named for Krause.

Krause died of the disease at his Wilsonville, Oregon home on June 13, 2008. He is survived by his wife, Jan, and four children.

== Legacy ==
Krause is a member of the Portland Interscholastic League Sports Hall of Fame, the Oregon Sports Hall of Fame, The Northwest Athletic Conference Hall of Fame and the University of Oregon Athletic Hall of Fame.
