= Riverside High School (Stafford, Oregon) =

Public high school in Tualatin, Oregon, U.S.

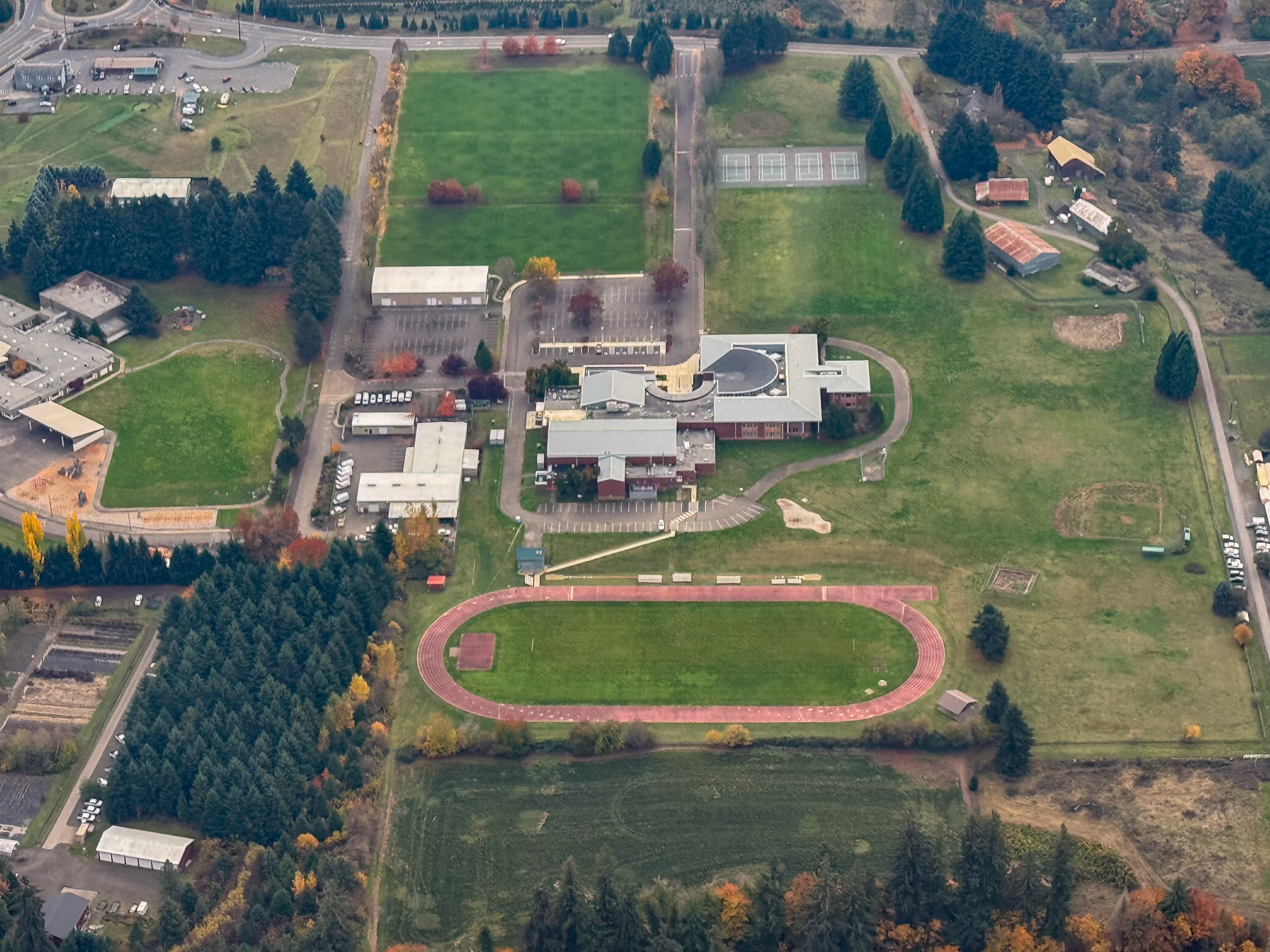
- Overhead view of the school, looking south

Location
- 2900 SW Borland Rd; Tualatin, Clackamas County, Oregon, 97062; United States; 45.3782°N 122.7063°W

Information
- Type: Public
- Established: c. September 2023
- School district: West Linn-Wilsonville School District
- Principal: Nic Chapin
- Assistant Principal: Carey Wilhelm
- Grades: 9–12
- Enrollment: 170
- Colors: Purple and Grey
- Athletics conference: 3A-1 Lewis & Clark League
- Mascot: Raptors
- Rival: Horizon Christian School (Tualatin, Oregon)
- Website: riversidehs.wlwv.k12.or.us

Riverside High School (colloquially RHS or just Riverside) is a public four-year high school in Stafford, Oregon, United States. It is a part of the West Linn-Wilsonville School District and a choice option for any 9th–12th grader in the district to attend instead of their neighborhood high school.

Enrollment in Riverside High School in the 2025-2026 school year was 196 students and is growing at a steady rate.

Riverside is located in the unincorporated community of Stafford near the Tualatin River and Stafford Primary School, also a part of the school district.

== Academics ==
The school contains many International Baccalaureate classes and requires all students to take IB Language and Literature in 11th grade. RHS also offers the IB Diploma Programme. Along with this there are many career and technical education programs in three categories: Business and Marketing, Construction and Architecture, and Health Occupations.

== Athletics ==
Riverside has had athletic teams since it opened in 2023. However, the school only started to compete at the varsity level in most sports in 2025.
