= Charbonneau, Oregon =

Charbonneau
- Neighborhood
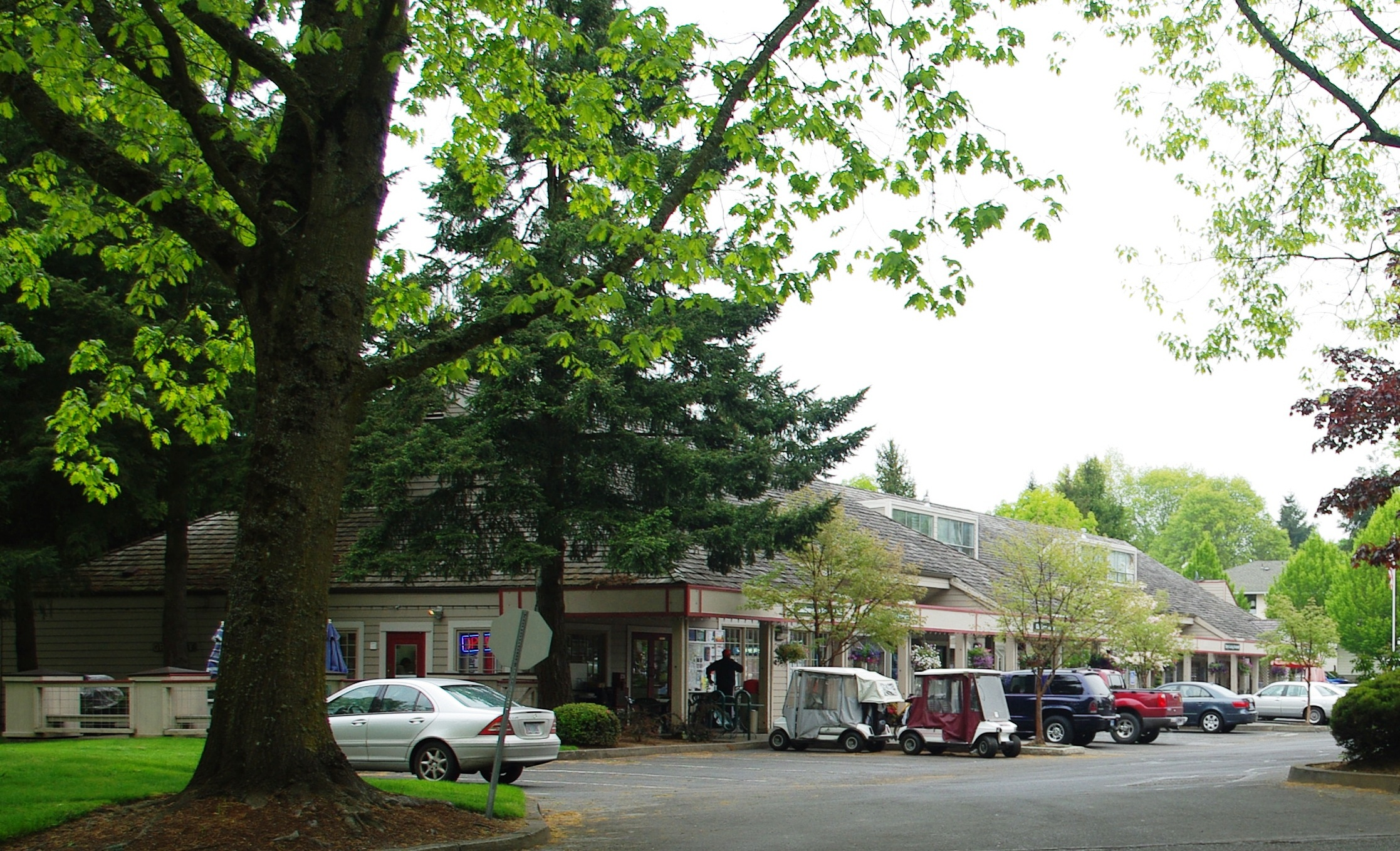
- Commercial district in Charbonneau

- Location within Oregon
- Coordinates: 45°17′14″N 122°45′29″W
- Country: United States
- State: Oregon
- Region: Clackamas County
- Time zone: Pacific
- Postal code: 97070

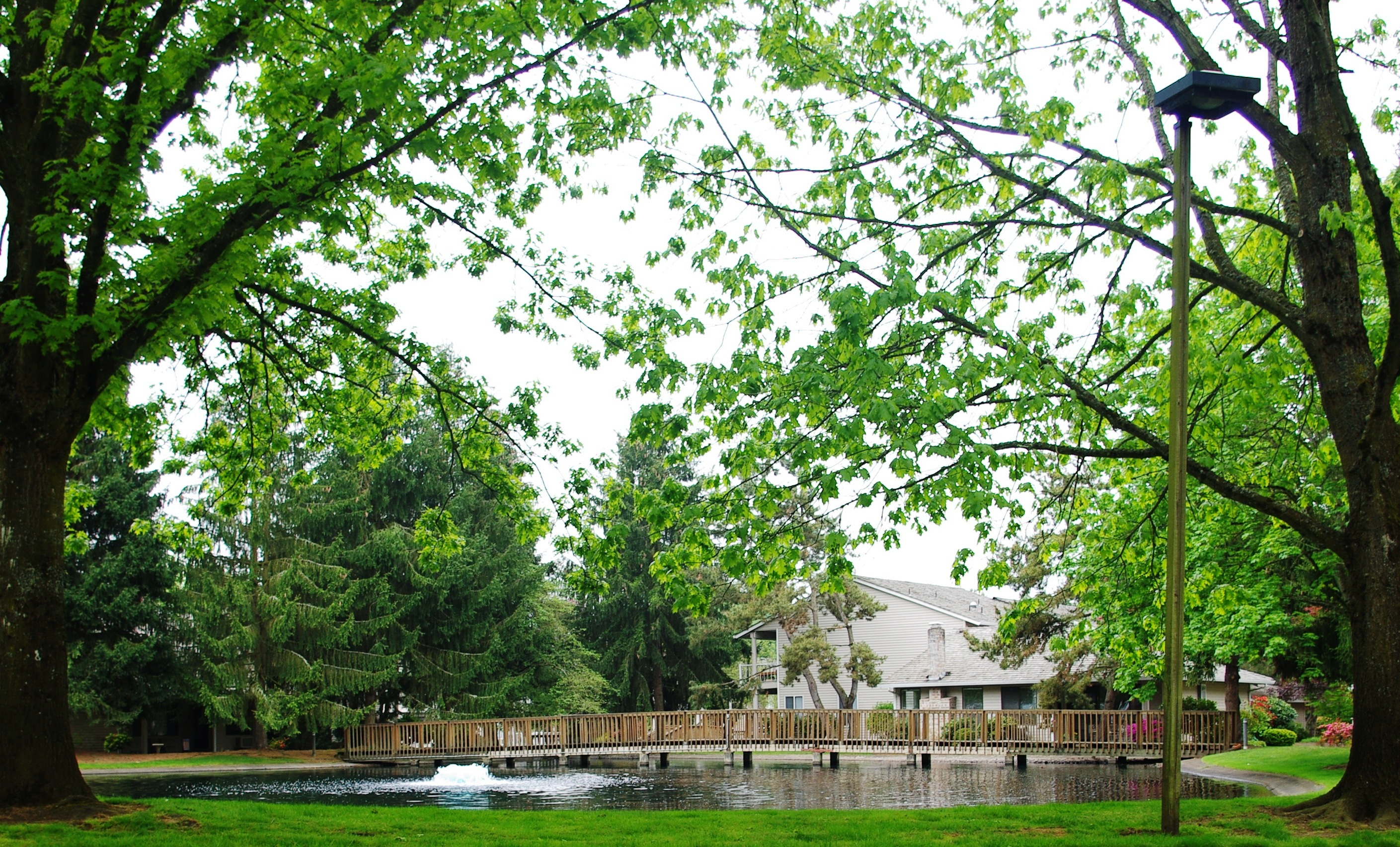
Pond and footbridge

Charbonneau (also known as the Charbonneau District) is a private planned community within the city limits of Wilsonville in Clackamas County, Oregon, United States. It is on the opposite side the Willamette River from the main area of the city. The development was named for Jean Baptiste Charbonneau, the son of Sacagawea.

Charbonneau began in 1972 as a nine-hole golf course and 228 town homes; it now has a population of about 3,500 living in 1,158 multi-family units and 510 houses with an integrated 27-hole golf course. There is also a small commercial district with about 10 shops including a grocery store and restaurant. As one of the oldest communities of its type in Oregon, its construction helped lead to the adoption of land-use planning and an urban growth boundary to attempt to prevent urban sprawl.

Charbonneau's 200 primary and secondary students are served by the Canby School District.
