= Boones Ferry =

American cable ferry in Oregon

Coordinates: 45.29312°N 122.775038°W

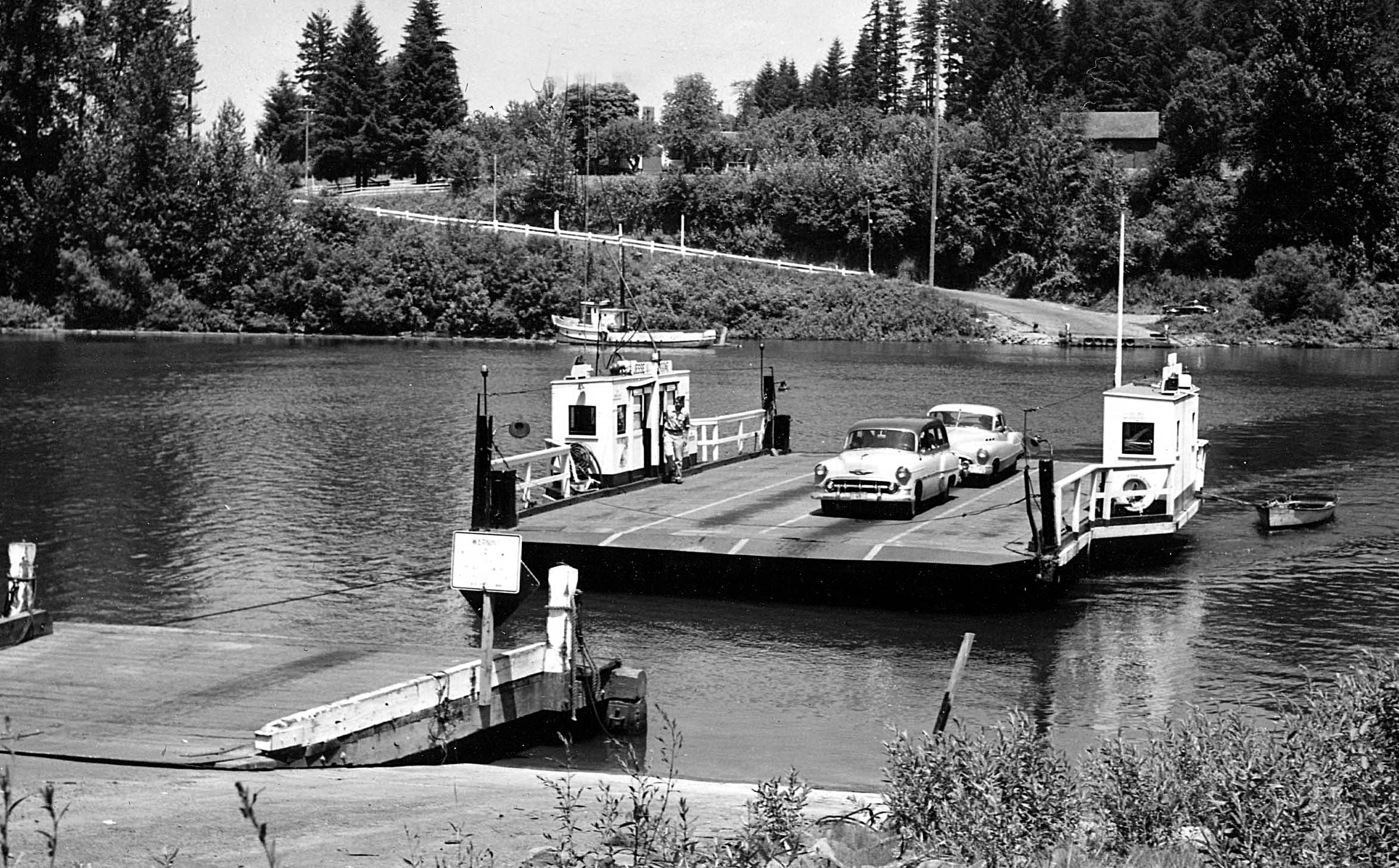
- Boones Ferry in 1954, two days before decommissioning
- Locale: Wilsonville, Oregon
- Waterway: Willamette River
- Began operation: 1847
- Ended operation: 1954
- Predecessor: none
- Successor: Boone Bridge

Boones Ferry (also Boone's Ferry) was a cable ferry which crossed the Willamette River at present-day Wilsonville, Oregon, United States, from 1847 to 1954. It was part of a major land-based thoroughfare in pioneer times linking fledgling Portland with the pre-territorial government at Champoeg, and later Salem. It was eventually made obsolete by the Boone Bridge on Interstate 5.

== History ==
The ferry was built by the family of Alphonso Boone (grandson of Daniel Boone) who, in 1846, claimed 1,000 acres (4.0 km^{2}) on and around present day Charbonneau which was on the main road between Oregon City and present day Butteville. The family cleared a path and laid a split log roadway north to Portland and south toward Salem. The ferry was propelled by oarsmen from the nearby Tuality Indian tribe. Alphonso was adamant about operating the ferry 24 hours a day.

When word of the California gold rush reached the area in 1848, Alphonso and his sons headed south. Alphonso died either February 1, 1850, or February 27, 1850, in the gold fields of a miner's disease, but his sons returned with their fortunes. Initially Alphonso, Jr. operated the ferry, but soon sold it to his brother Jesse, who operated it until his death in 1872 at the hand of a neighbor over a river access dispute. Afterward, the ferry was owned and operated by several people for a few years, before it passed to Clackamas County. By the early 1900s, the State of Oregon controlled it.

Shortly after the establishment of Boones Ferry, the community of Boones Landing was established and quickly grew. It was the precursor of Wilsonville.

The completion of the Baldock Freeway Bridge (now Boone Bridge) in 1954 resulted in decommissioning of the ferry, which made up to 300 trips per day, carrying up to 12 autos at a time.

Many sections of the road are still in use and named Boones Ferry Road, which closely parallels contemporary Interstate 5. Today, at the end of one of the road fragments on the north shore is Boones Ferry Park, in Wilsonville, located where one terminal was; the south shore has a marina with a boat ramp in approximately the historical location of the other terminal. The ferry crossing site is about 2,000 feet (610 m) west of I-5 and is visible from the southbound lanes of the Boone Bridge.

== See also ==
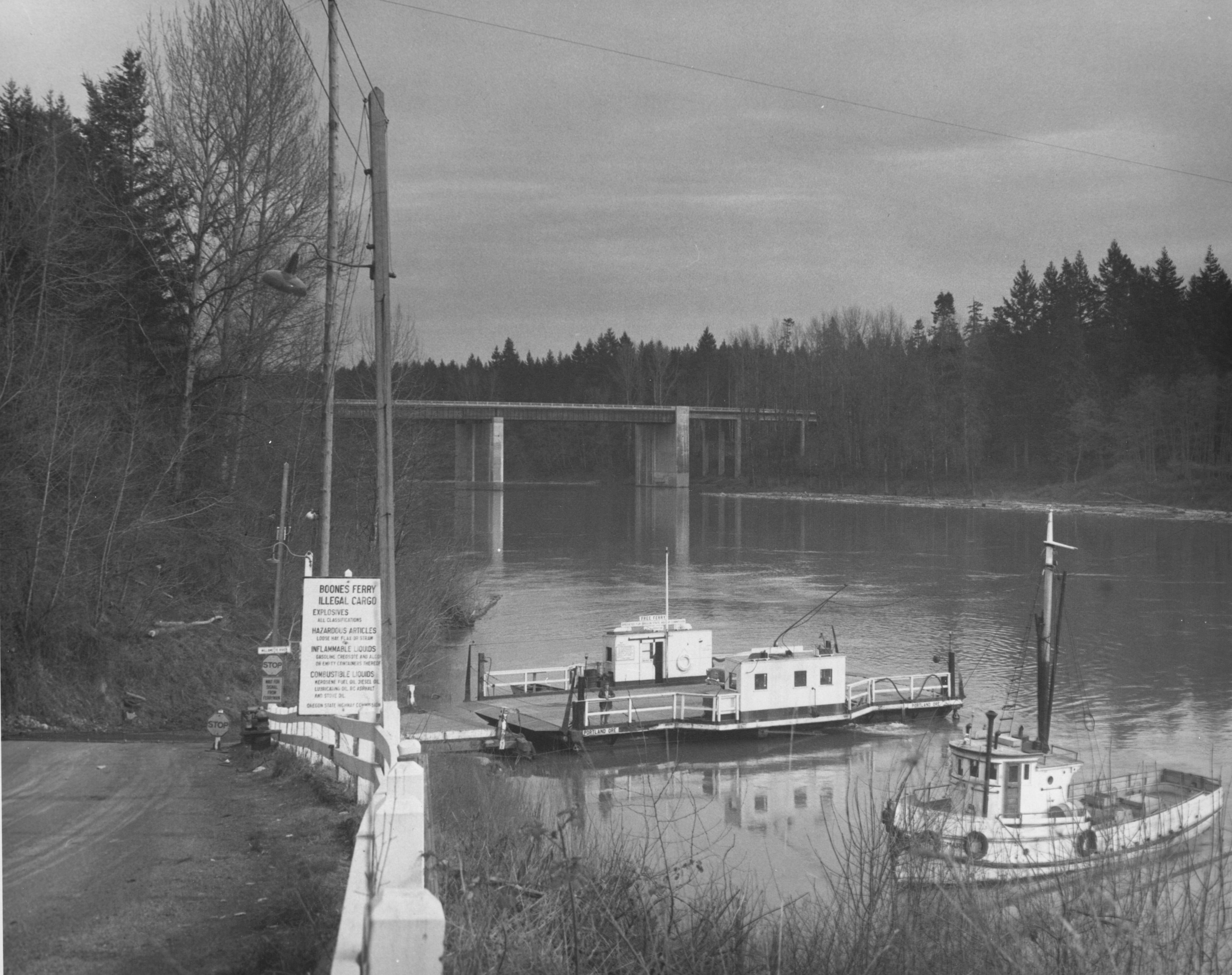
View in the mid-1950s of Boone's Ferry landing

- Champoeg Meetings
- Scholls, Oregon

=== Existing ferries across the Willamette ===
- Canby Ferry
- Buena Vista Ferry
- Wheatland Ferry

=== Historic ferries across the Willamette ===
- Stark Street Ferry in Portland
- Taylors Ferry in Portland
