= West Linn-Wilsonville School District =

School district in Oregon, United States

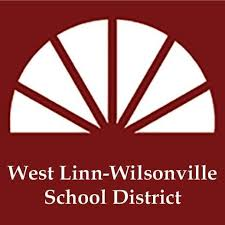

Address
- 22210 SW Stafford Road Stafford, Oregon, 97062; United States

District information
- Type: Public
- Grades: K-12
- Established: 1933
- Superintendent: Kathy Ludwig
- Schools: 16

Students and staff
- Students: 8,500 (2025-2026)
- Faculty: 544

Other information
- Website: www.wlwv.k12.or.us

West Linn-Wilsonville School District (WLWVSD 3J) is a school district in the Portland metropolitan area on the western edge of Clackamas County. The district spans roughly 42 miles (68 km), entirely covering the cities of West Linn and Wilsonville, a small portion of Tualatin, and the community of Stafford, along the Willamette River.

As of fall 2026, the district has roughly 8,500 students across 16 schools educating pre-kindergarten through twelfth grade. This includes eight primary schools (K-5), four middle schools (6-8), and three high schools (9-12). Two of the high schools are neighborhood schools (West Linn High School and Wilsonville High School), the third, Riverside High School, is open for any student in the district upon transfer request, and is an IB program school. The district also sponsors one charter school (G.4-8), Three Rivers Charter School.

== History ==
The district formed in 1933 as a consolidation of three school districts called West Linn Union School District. This included Stafford School, Bolton School, and Willamette School, which still exist today (though in different buildings), and West Linn Union High School, which was renamed to West Linn High School in 1938. Wilsonville was also consolidated into the district, which at the time only had one K-8 school, Wilsonville Primary School. At the time, the city was unincorporated with only a few hundred residents. High schoolers had to take a bus to West Linn.

When the city was incorporated in the 1968, Wilsonville began seeing significant growth. Wilsonville Primary School began to see overcrowding, and so Inza R. Wood Middle School opened in the 1980's. High school students still required to take a bus to West Linn, and residents were begging for the district to open a dedicated high school in the city. Wilsonville High School finally opened in 1995. Since then, two new primary schools and a middle school have opened, and Wilsonville Primary School closed upon the opening of Boones Ferry Primary School.

== Demographics ==
In the 2025-2026 school year, out of 8,557 students, 32% are of a minority of some type, 12% experience poverty, 53% are male and 47% are female.

White students are the majority, making up 68% of the district, 16% are Hispanic, 10% are multiracial, 4% are Asian, 1% are Black/African American, less than 1% are Pacific Islander/Native Hawaiian, and less than 1% are American Indian/Alaska Native.

== Boundary ==
The district is mostly in Clackamas County. There, it includes almost all of West Linn, a majority of Wilsonville, and a portion of Tualatin. It also includes most of the Stafford census-designated place.

A portion extends into Washington County, where it includes a portion of that county's part of Wilsonville.

== Schools ==
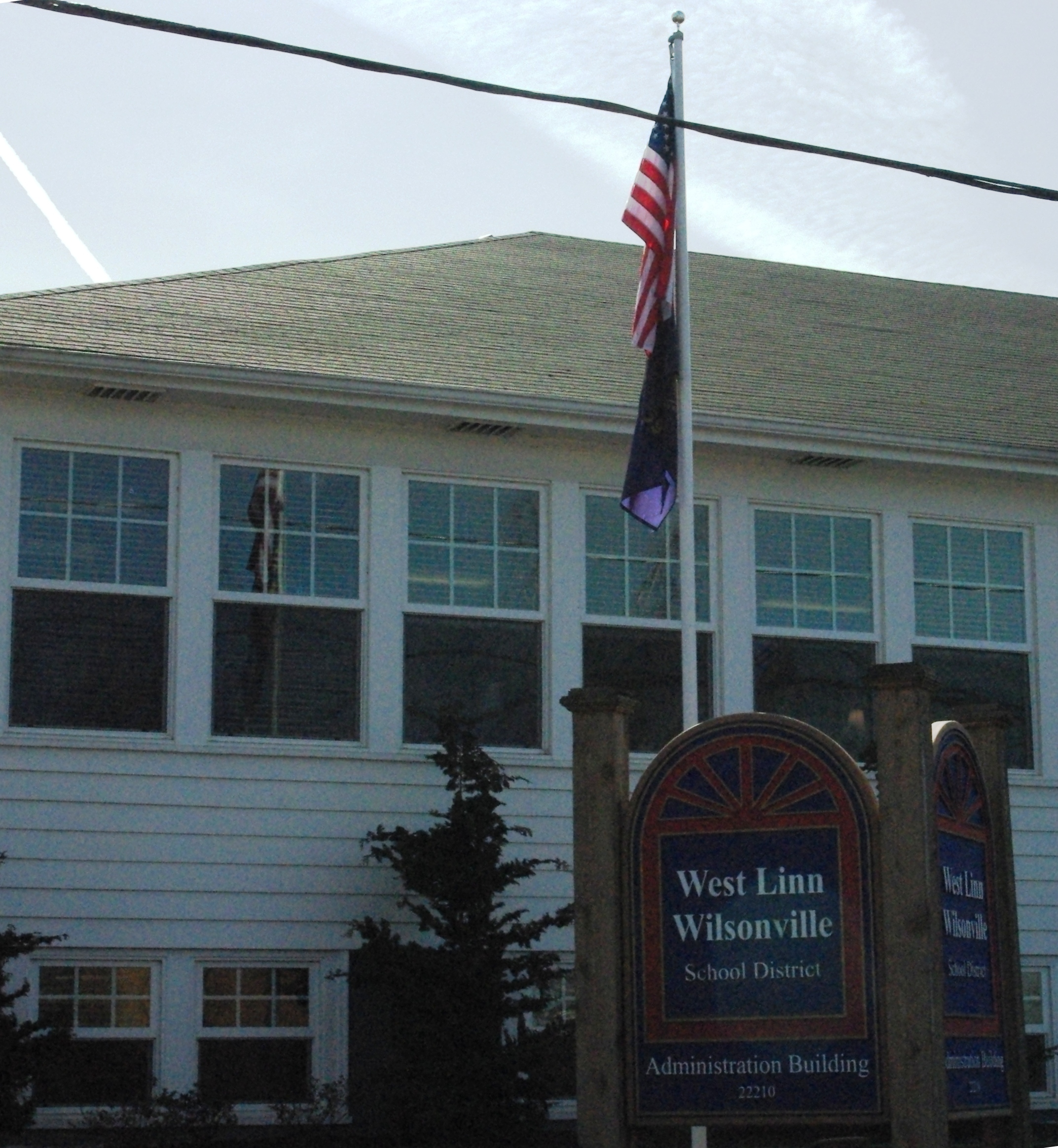
District headquarters at former Stafford Primary

=== Primary Schools (K-5) ===
| Name | Opened | Enrollment | Mascot | Location | Feeder to |
|---|---|---|---|---|---|
| Boeckman Creek | 1990 | 488 | Bobcat | Wilsonville | Meridian Creek |
| Boones Ferry | 2001 | 427 | Dragonfly | Wilsonville | Inza Wood |
| Cedaroak Park | 1958 | 348 | Squirrel | West Linn | Rosemont Ridge |
| Frog Pond* | 2026 | N/A | Hoppers | Wilsonville | Meridian Creek |
| Lowrie | 2012 | 482 | Wolf | Wilsonville | Inza Wood |
| Sunset | 1941 | 375 | Eagle | West Linn | Rosemont Ridge |
| Trillium Creek | 2012 | 480 | Owl | West Linn | Rosemont Ridge |
| Willamette | 1896 | 384 | Dinosaur | West Linn | Athey Creek |

*Opening in 2026

=== Middle Schools (6-8) ===
| Name | Opened | Enrollment | Mascot | Location | Feeder to |
|---|---|---|---|---|---|
| Athey Creek | 1991 | 470 | Cougar | West Linn | West Linn |
| Inza R. Wood | 1965 | 441 | Wolverine | Wilsonville | Wilsonville |
| Meridian Creek | 2017 | 368 | Mustang | Wilsonville | Wilsonville |
| Rosemont Ridge | 1994 | 699 | Coyote | West Linn | West Linn |

=== High Schools (9-12) ===
| Name | Opened | Enrollment | Mascot | Location | Feeder schools |
|---|---|---|---|---|---|
| Riverside | 2023 | 196 | Raptor | Stafford | N/A |
| West Linn | 1919 | 1,724 | Lion | West Linn | Athey Creek and Rosemont Ridge |
| Wilsonville | 1995 | 1,171 | Wildcat | Wilsonville | Inza Wood and Meridian Creek |

== School Board ==
There are five school board members, each serving four-year terms.

| Zone | Name | Term ends |
|---|---|---|
| 1 | Mike Selvaggio | 2029 |
| 2 | Maegan Vidal (vice chair) | 2027 |
| 3 | Kirsten Wyatt | 2029 |
| 4 | Dan Schumaker | 2027 |
| 5 | Kelly Sloop (chair) | 2029 |
