= Canby High School =

Public high school in Canby, Oregon, US

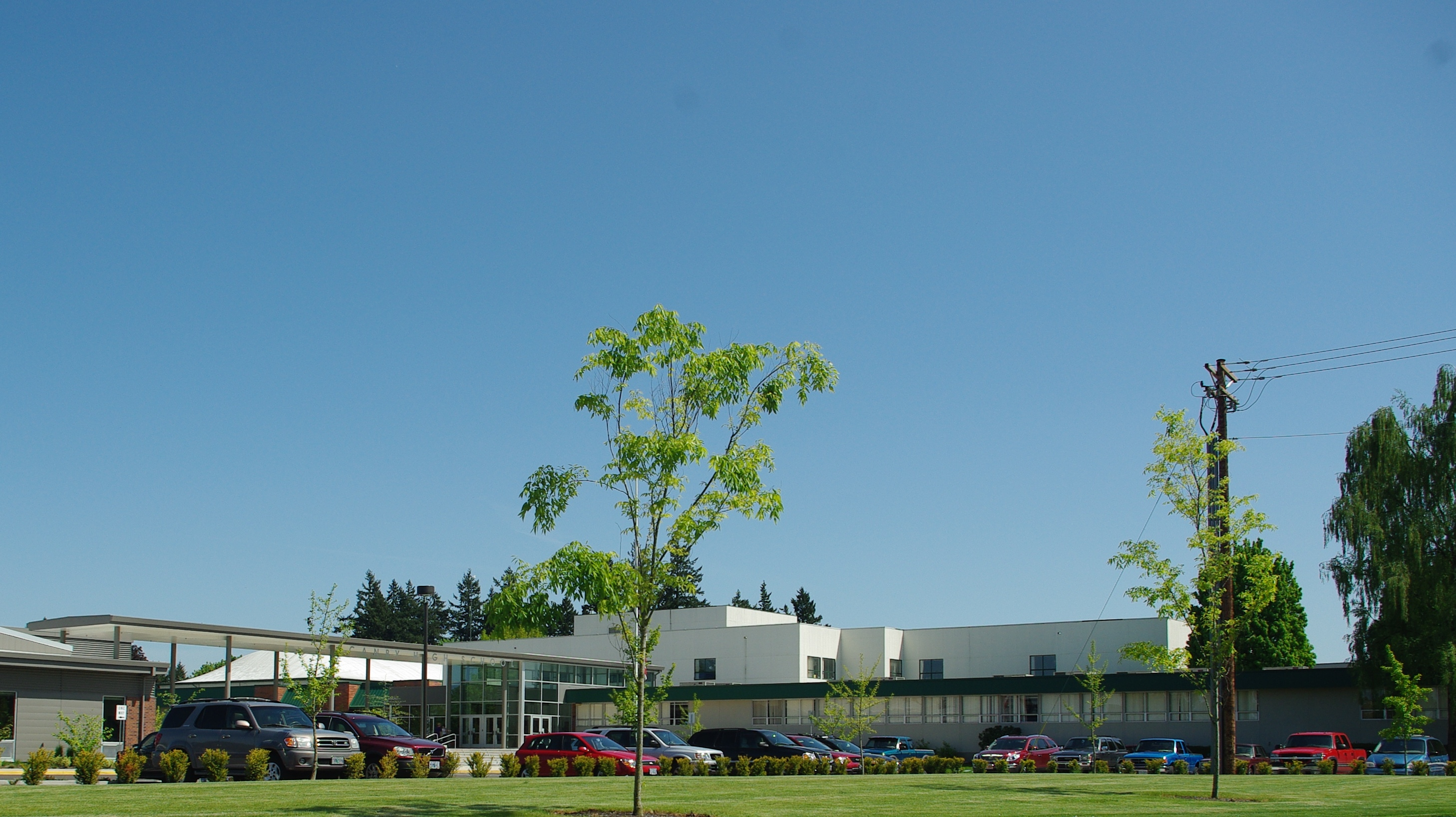

Location
- 721 SW 4th Ave. Canby, (Clackamas County), Oregon 97013; United States; 45.256681°N 122.699068°W

Information
- School district: Canby School District
- Principal: Cari Sloan
- Teaching staff: 66.52 (FTE)
- Grades: 9-12
- Enrollment: 1,352 (2021-2022)
- Student to teacher ratio: 20.32
- Colors: Navy and Vegas gold
- Athletics conference: OSAA 5A-1 Northwest Oregon Conference
- Mascot: Cougar
- Team name: Cougars
- Rival: Wilsonville High School
- Feeder schools: Baker Prairie Middle School, Ninety-One K-8 School
- Website: www.canbyhs.canby.k12.or.us

Canby High School is a public high school located in Canby, Oregon, United States. It is the only high school in the Canby School District.

== Academics ==
In 2017, 88% of the school's seniors received a high school diploma. Of 365 students, 338 graduated, 37 dropped out.

In 2022, 82% of the school's seniors received a high school diploma. Out of 332 students, 293 graduated, and 39 dropped out or were in high school the following year.

== Athletics ==
Prior to the 2022–2023 school year, Canby High School athletic teams competed in the OSAA 6A-5 Three Rivers League. Canby High School currently competes in the OSAA 5A-1 Northwest Oregon Conference and will remain in the league until the 2025–2026 school year.

State Championships:

- Boys Soccer: 1990
- Choir: 2023, 2024, 2025
- Dance/Drill: 2015, 2016, 2017, 2018, 2019, 2023 (5A), 2023 (Show)
- Softball: 1994, 2001
- Wrestling: 1955, 1956, 1962, 1963

== Notable alumni ==
- Joni Harms (1977), singer
- Jay Baller (1979), MLB player
- Tarah Wheeler (1997), cybersecurity executive
- Jana Schmieding (2000), actor, comedian, writer
- Derek Devine (2003), professional football player
- Clint Chapman (2007), basketball player
- Jacqueline Wiles (2010), Alpine skier
- Amanda Staehely, member of the Oregon House of Representatives
