= Library Information Network of Clackamas County =

Libraries in Clackamas County (Library District of Clackamas County)
- LINCC logo since 2025
- Location: Clackamas County, Oregon, United States
- Type: Public library district
- Established: 1997 (as consortium); 2008 (as district)
- Reference to legal mandate: Measure 3-310 (2008 district)

Other information
- Website: https://lincc.ent.sirsi.net/client/en_US/lincc/

Libraries in Clackamas County (LINCC) is a consortium of the public libraries of Clackamas County, Oregon, United States. It was established in 1977 when the first county-wide funding levy was approved by county voters. LINCC is a resource and revenue sharing network with a single library computer system.

The consortium remains distinct from the Library District of Clackamas County created by a ballot measure voted on during the 2008 general election.

== Consortium ==
LINCC includes:

- two locations operated by the county: Oak Grove (Oak Lodge) and Gladstone,
- two branches operated by the city of Sandy: Sandy, Hoodland (in Welches)
- the city libraries operated by Canby, Estacada, Happy Valley, Lake Oswego, Milwaukie (the Ledding Library), Molalla, Oregon City, West Linn, and Wilsonville.

The Happy Valley Library was originally opened as the Sunnyside branch of the Clackamas County Library in 2012 to replace the Clackamas Corner branch near the Clackamas Town Center. The county transferred the library to the City of Happy Valley effective July 1, 2015. The City of Gladstone transferred their local library to Clackamas County effective December 1, 2019.

The member libraries share an integrated library system which allows cooperative borrowing. Shared services, including cataloging, computer support, courier, and interlibrary loan, are coordinated by the Network Office, a department of the county government. As of 2025, the system offers more than 750,000 print books, 170,000 physical audio and video items, and 278,000 digital books and audiobooks. It serves over 150,000 members, who check out more than 6 million physical and digital items each year.

== Library District ==
In November 2008, Measure 3-310 was passed by Clackamas County voters, leading to the creation of a Library District that established permanent property tax-based funding for libraries in the county.

The cities of Damascus, Tualatin, and Johnson City opted out of the district's creation. In May 2010, a close vote by the small subset of Tualatin residents who are also Clackamas County residents meant that they would join the district. Following a petition signed by 300 Damascus residents, Damascus voters approved a measure to join the Clackamas County library district in November 2010.
