= Canby School District =

School district in Oregon, US

Location
- Clackamas County Greater Canby, Oregon United States

District information
- Type: Public
- Grades: K-12
- Superintendent: Jennifer Patterson
- Budget: $49.96 million (2014-15)

Students and staff
- Students: 4,220 (2022)

Other information
- High Schools: 1
- Middle Schools: 1
- Elementary Schools: 5 (1 K- 8 School)
- Website: www.canby.k12.or.us/

Canby School District is an 85-square-mile (220 km^{2}) public school district based in Canby, Oregon, United States, and serving students in Canby and the surrounding rural area of Clackamas County, including the community of Carus, parts of the city of Wilsonville, and as far south as the Ninety-One School near Hubbard. There are approximately 4200 students enrolled in the district's eight schools, which include five elementary schools, one middle school, one K-8 school, and one high school. The superintendent is Jennifer Patterson.

== Demographics ==
According to the National Center for Education Statistics, the school district's general population was 82% Caucasian, 14% Hispanic or Latino of any race, 2% Asian, and 2% two or more races. The median household income was $92,312 in 2022, with 10.8% of families making an income below the poverty level. Just 4.9% of children 5 years or older spoke English less than very well with 20.9% speaking English very well or 74.2% speaking English only.

== Schools ==
Name of School	Grades	Enrollment (2022)	Principal
Baker Prairie Middle School	7-8	611	Sam Thompson
Canby High School	9-12	1352	Cari Sloan
Carus Elementary School	K-6	449	Nicole Goff
Cecile Trost Elementary School	K-6	446	Angie Navarro
Howard Eccles Elementary School	K-6	494	Kelly Rogers
Ninety-One School	K-8	474	Andrew Pauls
Philander Lee Elementary School	K-6	443	Cherie Switzer
William Knight Elementary School	K-6	364	Christine Taylor

Canby's elementary schools are Carus, Eccles, Knight, Lee, and Trost; Baker Prairie serves students in grades 7-8, and Canby High serves students in grades 9-12. Its sole K-8 school, Ninety-One School, was formed from a merger of five rural schools in 1947. After heated debate over the name for the new school, in March 1950, it was named the "Ninety-One Joint School" after what was then School District 91. A month later, the word "Joint" was dropped from the name.
