= Arlington Heights, Portland, Oregon =

Arlington Heights
- Neighborhood
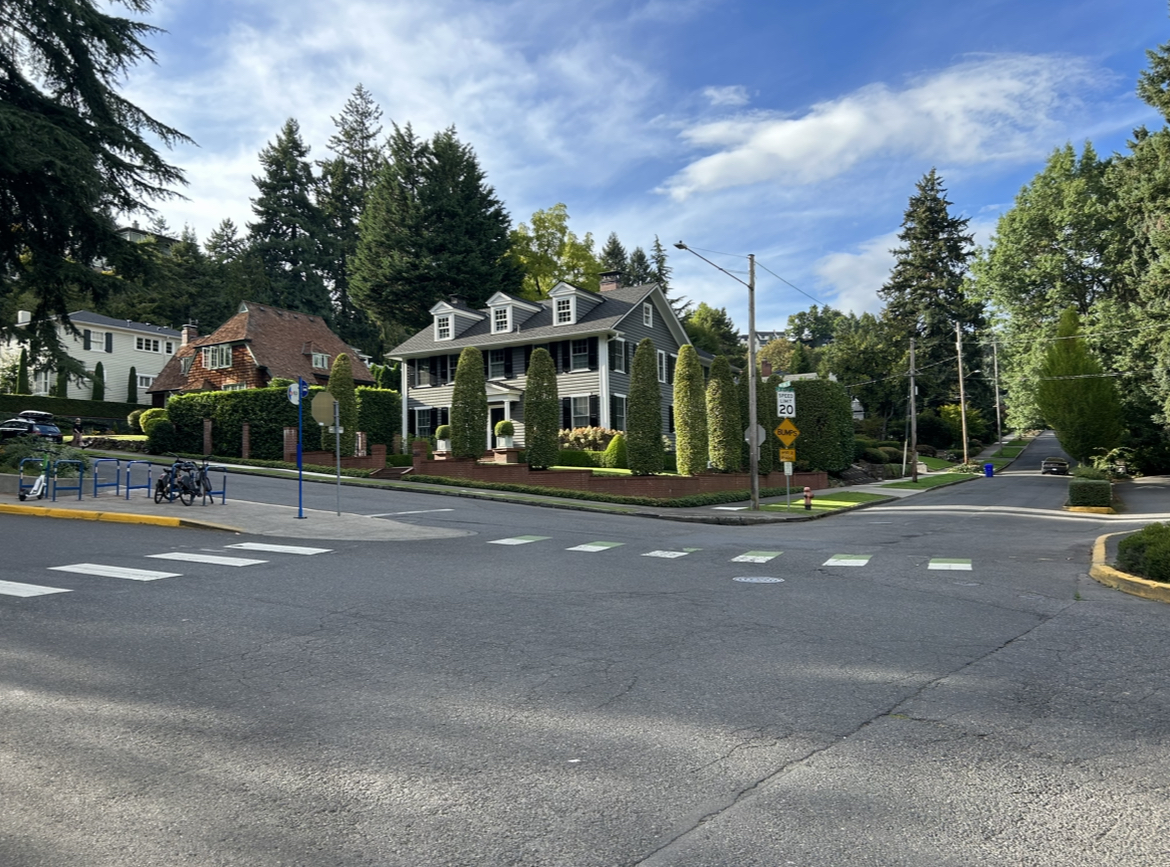
- Interactive map of Arlington Heights
- Coordinates: 45°31′16″N 122°42′38″W
- Country: United States
- State: Oregon
- City: Portland

Government
  - Association: Arlington Heights Neighborhood Association
  - Coalition: District Four Coalition

Area
  - Total: 0.92 sq mi (2.4 km^{2})

Population (2020)
  - Total: 813
  - Density: 884/sq mi (341/km^{2})

Housing
  - No. of households: 293
  - Occupancy rate: 94.1% occupied
  - Owner-occupied: 263 households (95%)
  - Renting: 15 households (5%)
  - Avg. household size: 2.8 persons

Arlington Heights is a neighborhood in Portland, Oregon known for its grand houses. It is home to Washington Park, the Portland Japanese Garden, the International Rose Test Garden, and the Oregon Zoo. The neighborhood is also home to the Washington Park station.

== Demographics ==
In 2020, 813 people lived in Arlington Heights, up 15% from 710 in 2010. 83% of these residents identified as white, 8.8% as Asian, 2.3% as American Indian or Alaska Native, 1.8% as Black or African American, 0.1% as Native Hawaiian or Pacific Islander, and 4.3% as some other race. 5.9% identified as Hispanic or Latino (any race). The median household income was listed at $173,000 and 61% of the neighborhood was covered by tree canopy.

== Parks ==
- Hoyt Arboretum
- Japanese Garden
- Vietnam Veterans of Oregon Memorial
- Washington Park
- International Rose Test Garden

== Gallery ==
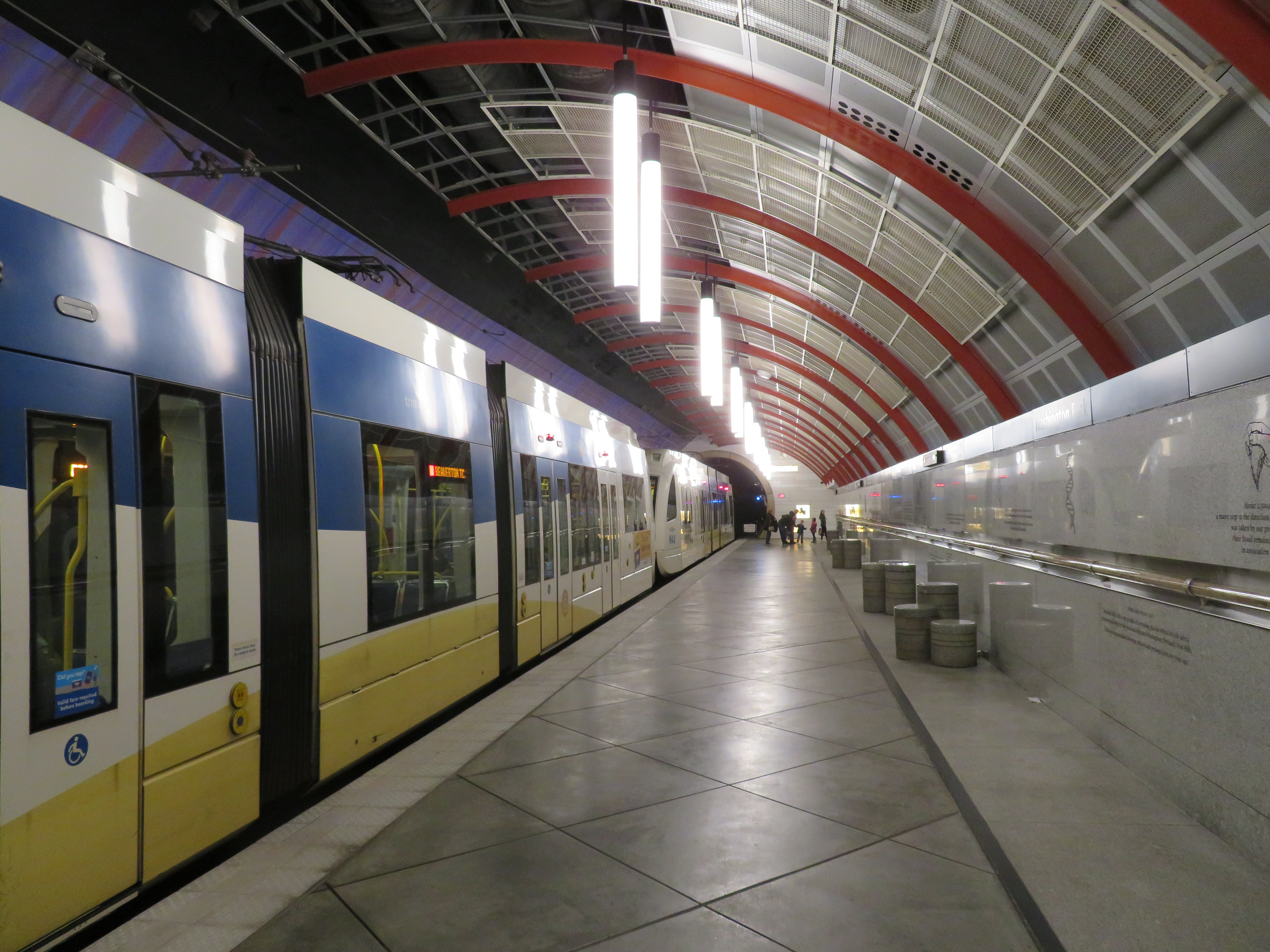
Washington Park station, the deepest train station in the western hemisphere and seventh deepest on the world

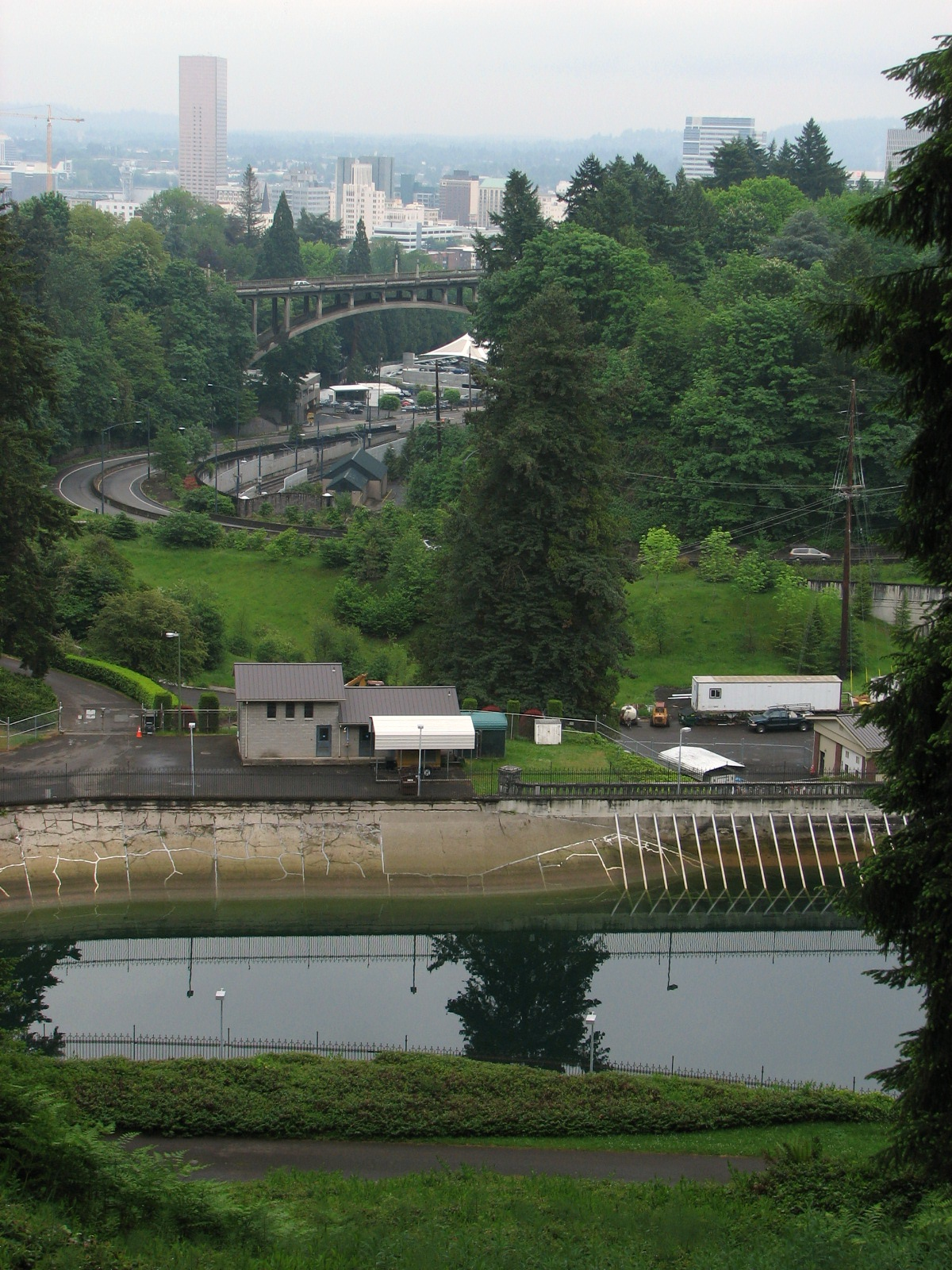
Historic Reservoir #4 in Washington Park

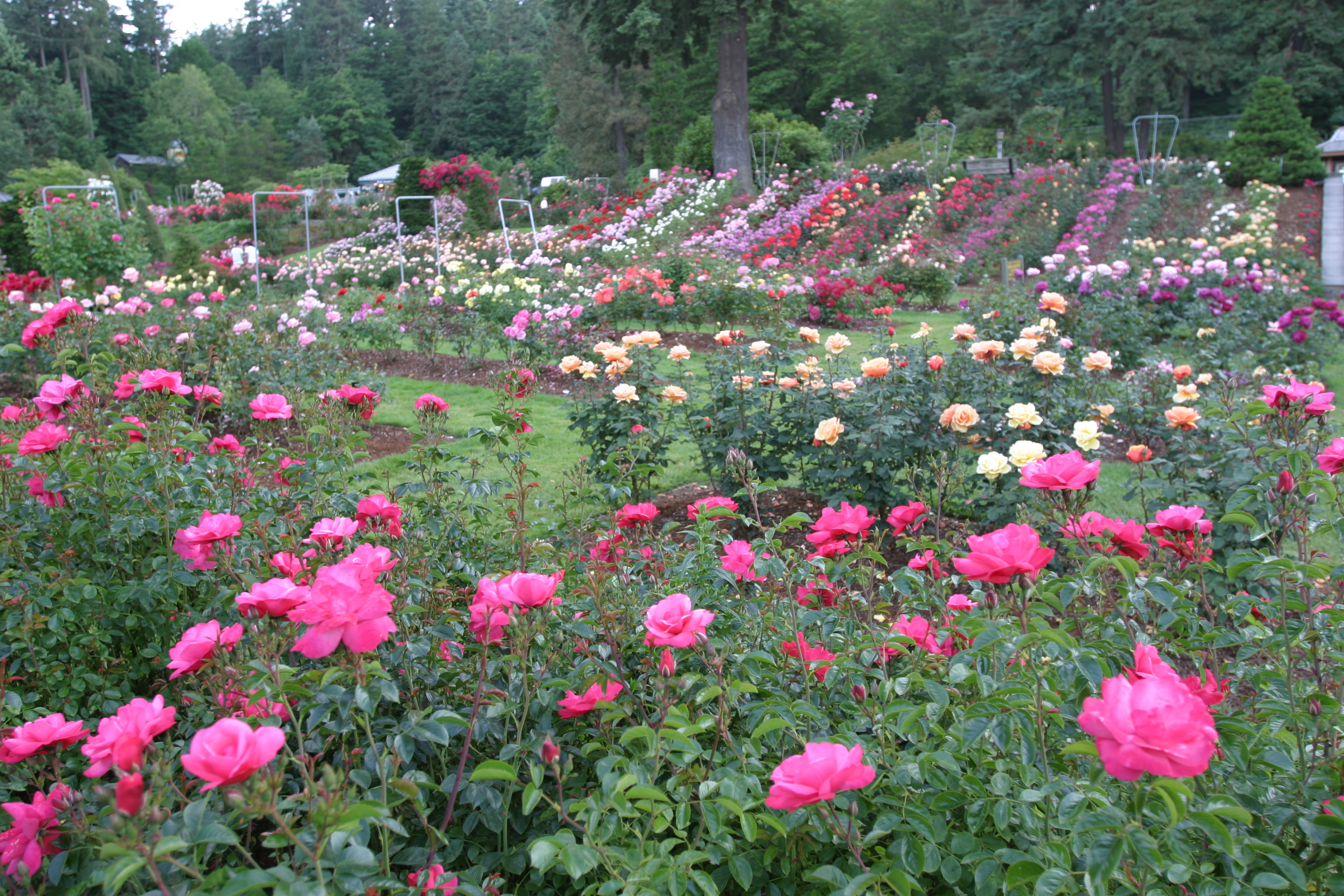
The International Rose Test Garden

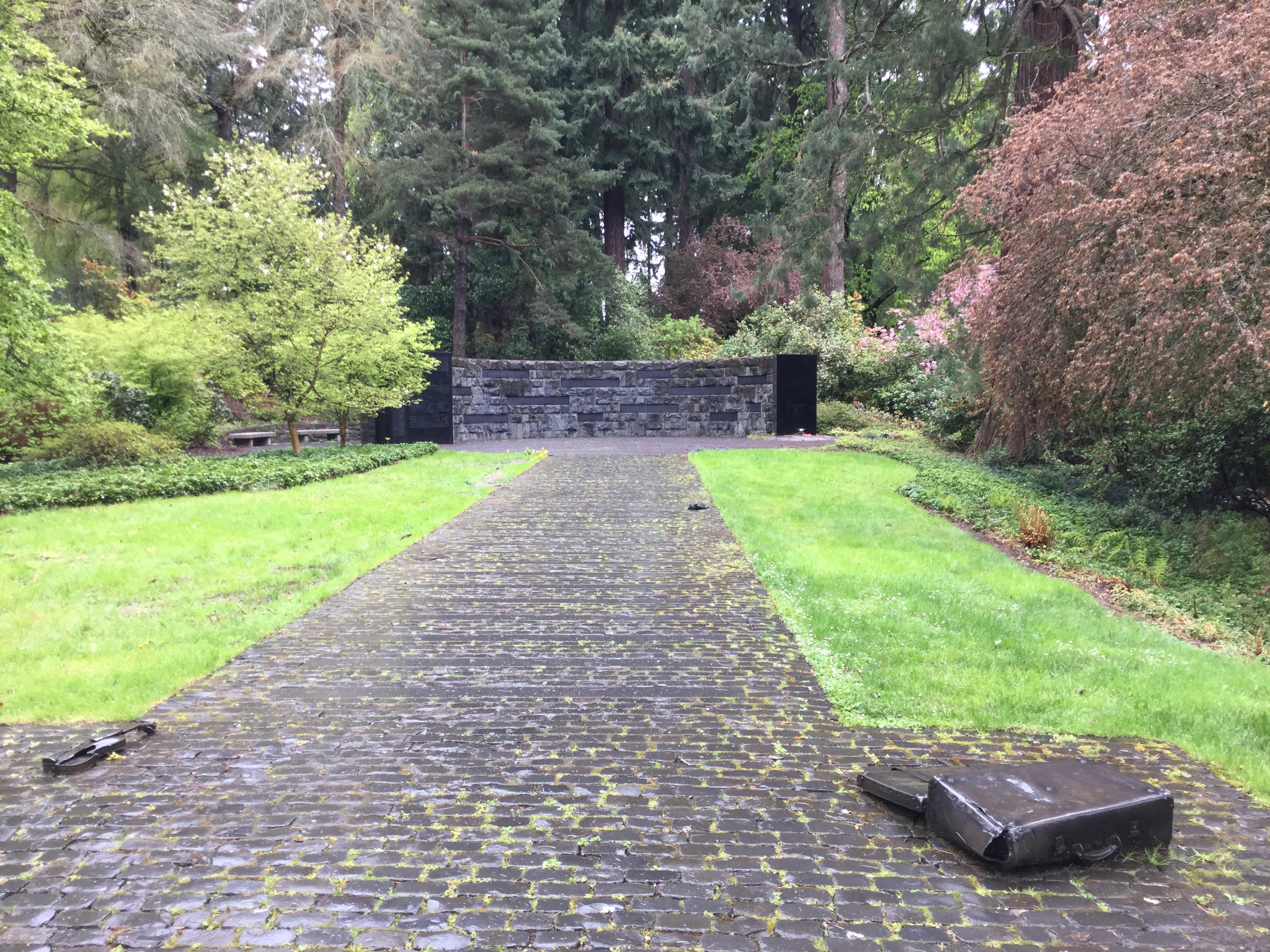
The Oregon Holocaust Memorial
