= Oregon Korean War Memorial =

War memorial in Wilsonville, Oregon, United States

- Oregon
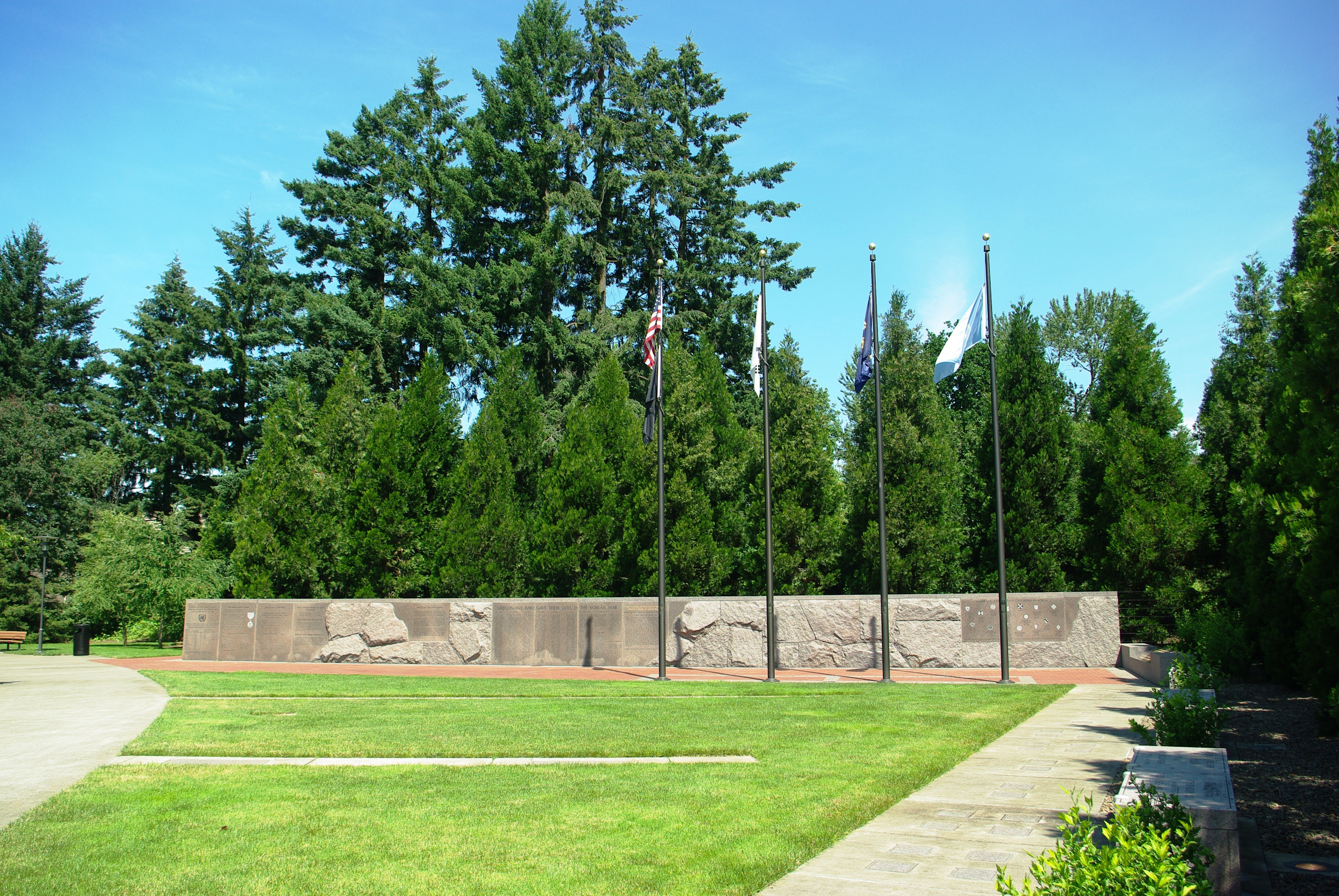
- Flags and main monument
- For Korean War
- Established: 2000
- Location: 45.3066°N 122.7631°W near Wilsonville, Oregon, USA

The Oregon Korean War Memorial is a war memorial located in Wilsonville, Oregon, United States. Completed in 2000, it honors the Oregon soldiers and the Korean people from the Korean War. The memorial is located within a 5.5-acre (22,000 m^{2}) city park and features a 109-foot (33 m)-long granite wall that includes the names of those Oregonians who died or were listed as missing from the war.

== History ==
Fundraising for the memorial in Oregon began in 1996, forty-three years after the Armistice Agreement that ended the Korean War. Designs for the memorial were approved on October 14, 1996, by the city of Wilsonville as part of its Town Center Park. A groundbreaking ceremony was held on May 8, 1998, for the project that included a visitors' center for the city at the park and memorial. The visitors' center was paid for partly by Clackamas County. Plans called for a tree-lined plaza that honored the 287 soldiers from Oregon that died in the war that lasted from 1950 to 1953, as well as honor the almost one million Koreans who died. Much of the memorial was paid for by fundraising and private donations, with the Oregon Korean War Veterans Association raising $50,000 by the time construction began. The original design was a smaller version of Seoul's East Gate.

Hyundai Semiconductor America donated US$100,000 to the project in January 2000, while other funds for the $450,000 memorial were raised from local companies and residents, including nearly $70,000 from Korean-Americans. A total of $110,000 was raised by donations of individuals, while South Korea donated $50,000. On September 30, 2000, the Oregon Korean War Memorial was officially dedicated in a ceremony attended by a Korean dignitary and Oregon politicians such as state supreme court justice George Van Hoomissen and state senator John Lim. Sixty thousand Oregonians fought in the Korean War, with 287 killed.

In 2002, vandalism at the memorial led to the installation of security cameras. In June 2006, a fifteen-foot extension was added to the granite wall to thank the Korean community for their support in building the monument. Former South Korean President Kim Dae-jung visited the memorial in April 2008.

== Details ==
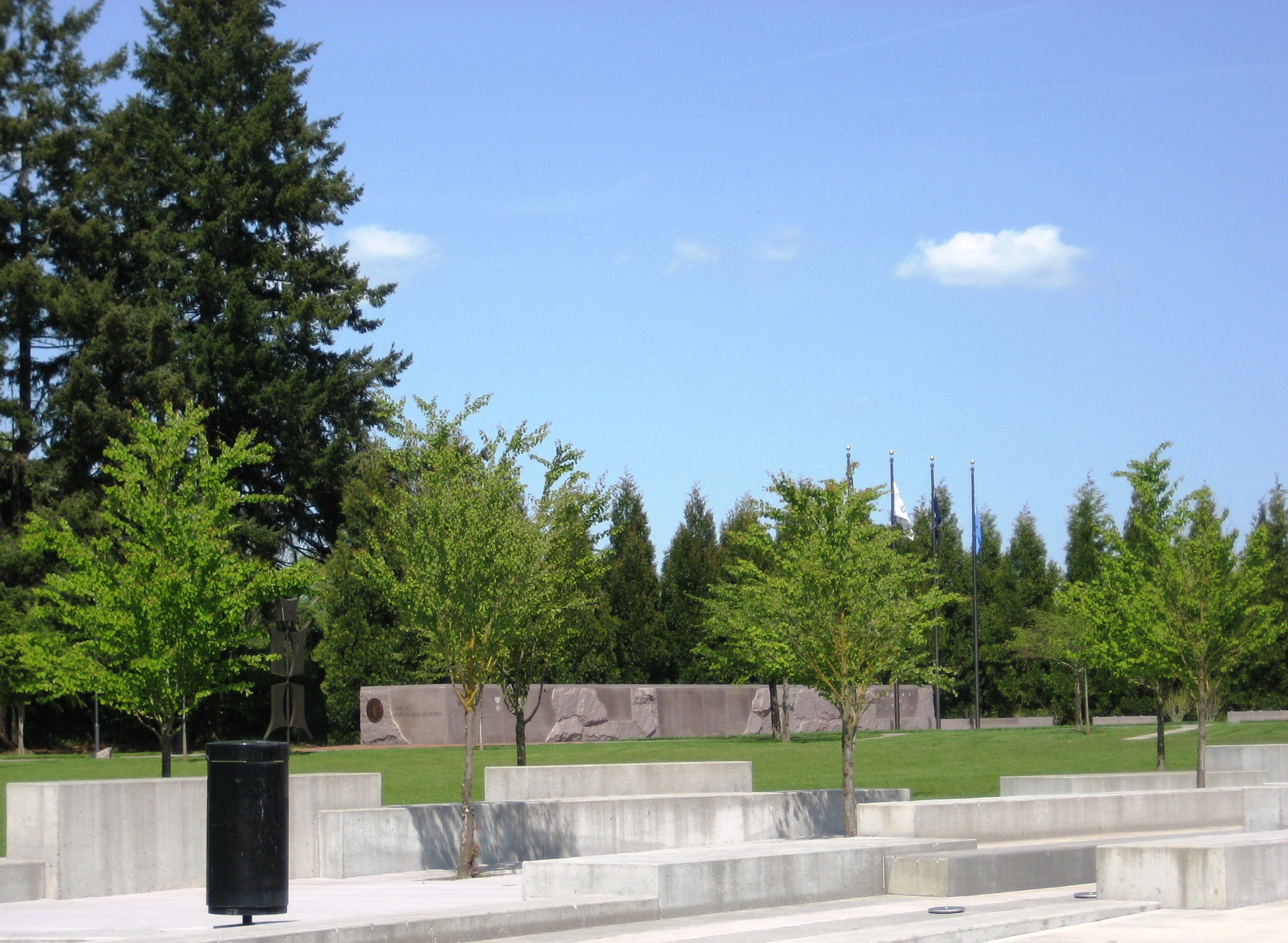
Memorial in the background with Town Center Park in the foreground

The memorial includes a 500-foot (150 m)-long path built of concrete that curves the length of the memorial at the 5.5-acre (22,000 m^{2}) park. This path is lined by two rows of cherry trees, and passes a red granite wall. The focus of the memorial, the wall includes the names of the 298 Oregonians killed or listed as missing in action from the war. Made of Carnelian granite, the wall was originally 94 feet (29 m) long, with 15 feet (4.6 m) added in 2006. In front of the wall is a 12-foot (3.7 m)-wide brick terrace that spans the entire length of the wall. Bricks in this plaza area are imbedded with the names of those who donated to the memorial.

Other features include the flags of the U.S., South Korea, Oregon, the United Nations, and POW/MIA; a water fountain, and bronze plaques engraved with key dates and events of the war. The flags are flown on 30-foot (9.1 m) tall flagpoles. In addition to the memorial, the park includes a 5,000-square-foot (460 m^{2}) visitors' center built at a cost of $1.5 million.

In 2017, a statue of General Douglas MacArthur, commander-in-chief of the United Nations Command from July 1950 to April 1951, was unveiled.

== See also ==
- Rose Quarter Veterans Memorial
- Oregon Holocaust Memorial
- Oregon Vietnam Veterans Memorial
- Wilsonville Memorial Park
