= Town Center Park =

Park in Wilsonville, Oregon, United States

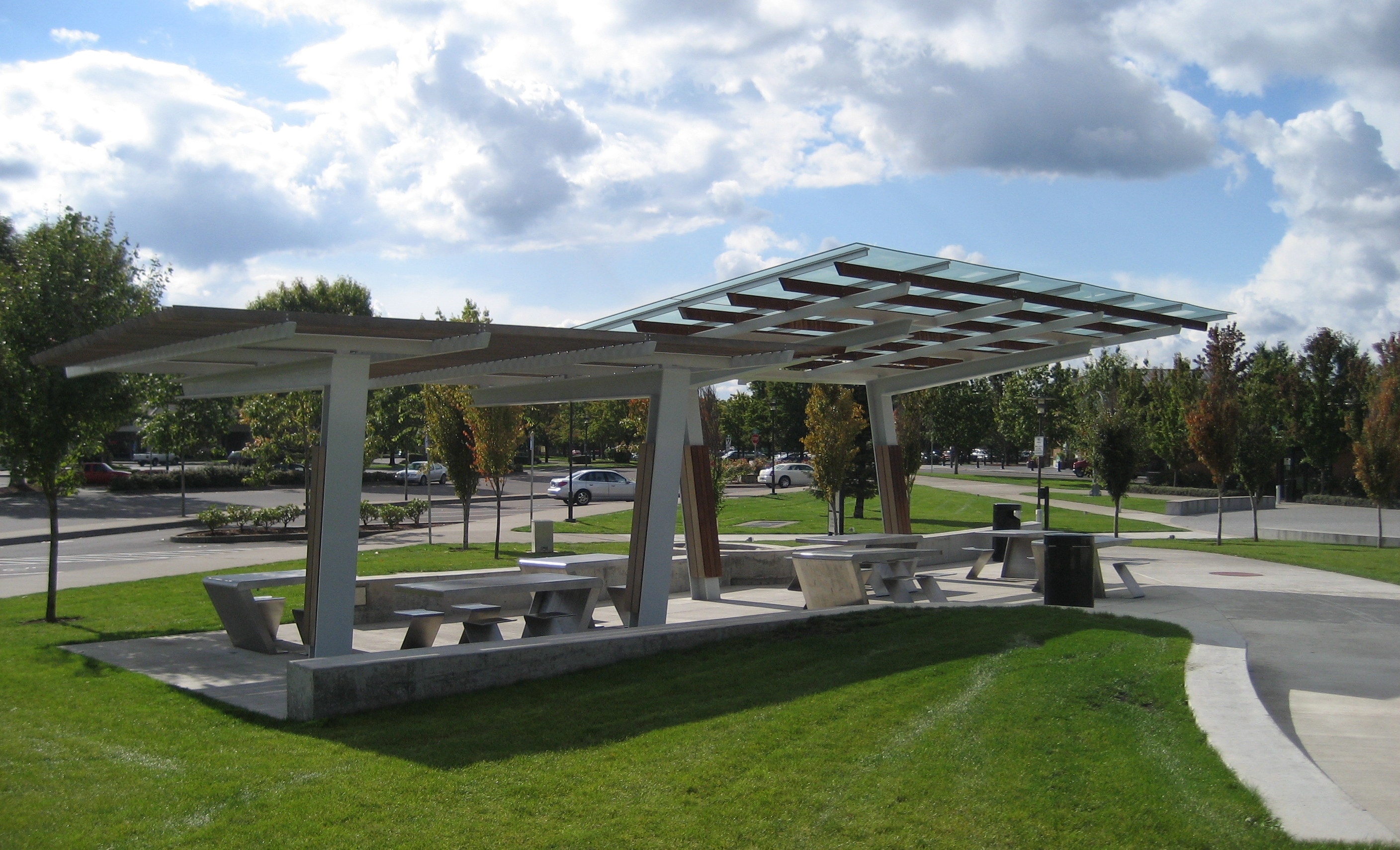
- Covered picnic area at the park
- Interactive map of Town Center Park
- Type: Public, city
- Location: Wilsonville, Oregon; United States
- Coordinates: 45°18′22″N 122°45′47″W
- Area: 5 acres (20,000 m^{2})
- Operator: Wilsonville Parks & Recreation
- Status: open
- Website: Website

Town Center Park is a small municipal park in Wilsonville, Oregon, United States. Located in the middle of Wilsonville's town center, the 5-acre (2.0 ha) park cost $4.5 million to complete. The park includes the Oregon Korean War Memorial, a visitor center, paths, a play area, picnic tables, and an amphitheater among other features. Completed in 2005, Town Center Park is also home to Wilsonville's first interactive water feature.

== History ==
Capital Realty donated the land for a park in the center of the Wilsonville town center development in 1994 on condition that it be used as a park. In September 1996, the city started to get more input from city residents on the plans for what was then to be a $2 million park. Early plans for the park included a war memorial for the Korean War, a clock tower, a pond, a fountain, landscaping, picnic areas, a basketball court, a play area for children, gardens, paths, an amphitheater, lawns, and a pavilion area to be partially covered and used to host events such as street fairs. Parking was also to be built, which included spaces for recreational vehicles.

By October 1996, the estimated cost to build the park had increased to $3.3 million. All funding for the park had been secured at that time, and was to come from Wilsonville and the county's lodging taxes and from a $1 million grant by the county's tourism council to be used to build a visitor center. Wilsonville's parks board approved of the plans that included the war memorial, the visitor center, gardens, paths, fountains, the amphitheater, and lawns at that time. The visitor center would also provide restrooms for the park, offer meeting space for the community, and be the home of the city's chamber of commerce.

In November 1996, Oregon voters passed Ballot Measure 47, which lowered property tax rates and imposed restrictions on raising those rates. Due to the passage of the measure, the city delayed the project because of concerns about the impact of the measure on funding for building and maintaining the park. The estimated cost to build Town Center Park at that time was $3.3 million. Plans for building the park later moved forward, and construction of the regional visitor center began in June 1998. The building opened at Town Center Park in April 1999 at a cost of $1.5 million.

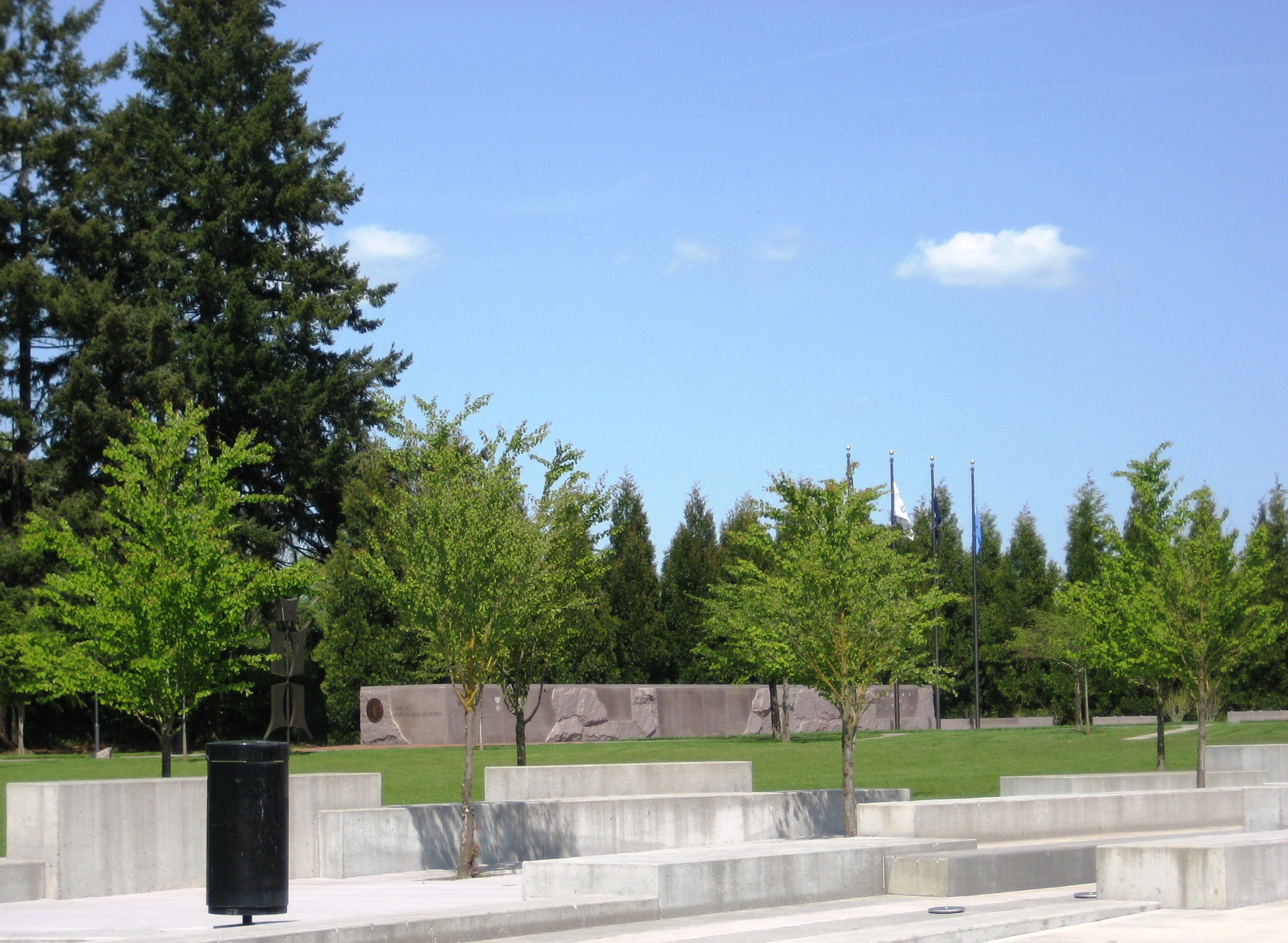
Water feature in foreground, Korean War Memorial in background

Construction on the war memorial started with a groundbreaking ceremony on May 4, 2000. In September 2000, the memorial was opened in the park to pay tribute to those soldiers from Oregon who died in the Korean War. During the summer months in 2000 and 2001 the park hosted a small farmer's market run by the chamber of commerce. Also in 2000, the park began hosting the annual Wilsonville Celebration Days.

The park was completed in the Spring of 2005 when the final phase of construction finished after adding several features, including an interactive water play area, the first in the city. The water feature had been delayed due to a water shortage in the city before the completion of a new water treatment plant. This last phase cost around $1.2 million and was paid for through funds generated by an urban renewal district and built by Hoffman Construction. Total costs for building the park came to $4.5 million. The fountain had to be closed due to water quality issues in June 2007, but re-opened a few days later. In October 2008, free Wi-Fi service was added to the park by the chamber of commerce.

== Amenities ==
Located within the 5-acre (2.0 ha) park are several structures and a variety of features. These include the Korean War Memorial and a visitor information center. The 5,000-square-foot (460 m^{2}) visitor center at the park was paid for by Clackamas County's Tourism Development Council and is operated by the Wilsonville Chamber of Commerce. A brick, wood, and glass structure, it is located at the southwest corner of the park and was constructed by First Cascade Corporation. The building also includes the park's public restrooms.

The park was designed by Murase Associates, headed by landscape architect Robert Murase. Features at the park include a water feature for people to play in, an amphitheater with stage, a picnic shelter, picnic tables, children's play equipment, paths, and a half-sized basketball court. The water feature is a zero-depth interactive element that has water cascade down a series of concrete channels to a small pond that contains bubblers. There is also the Rotary Rose Garden operated by the local Rotary Club and trees dedicated to the city's sister city relationship.

== Events ==
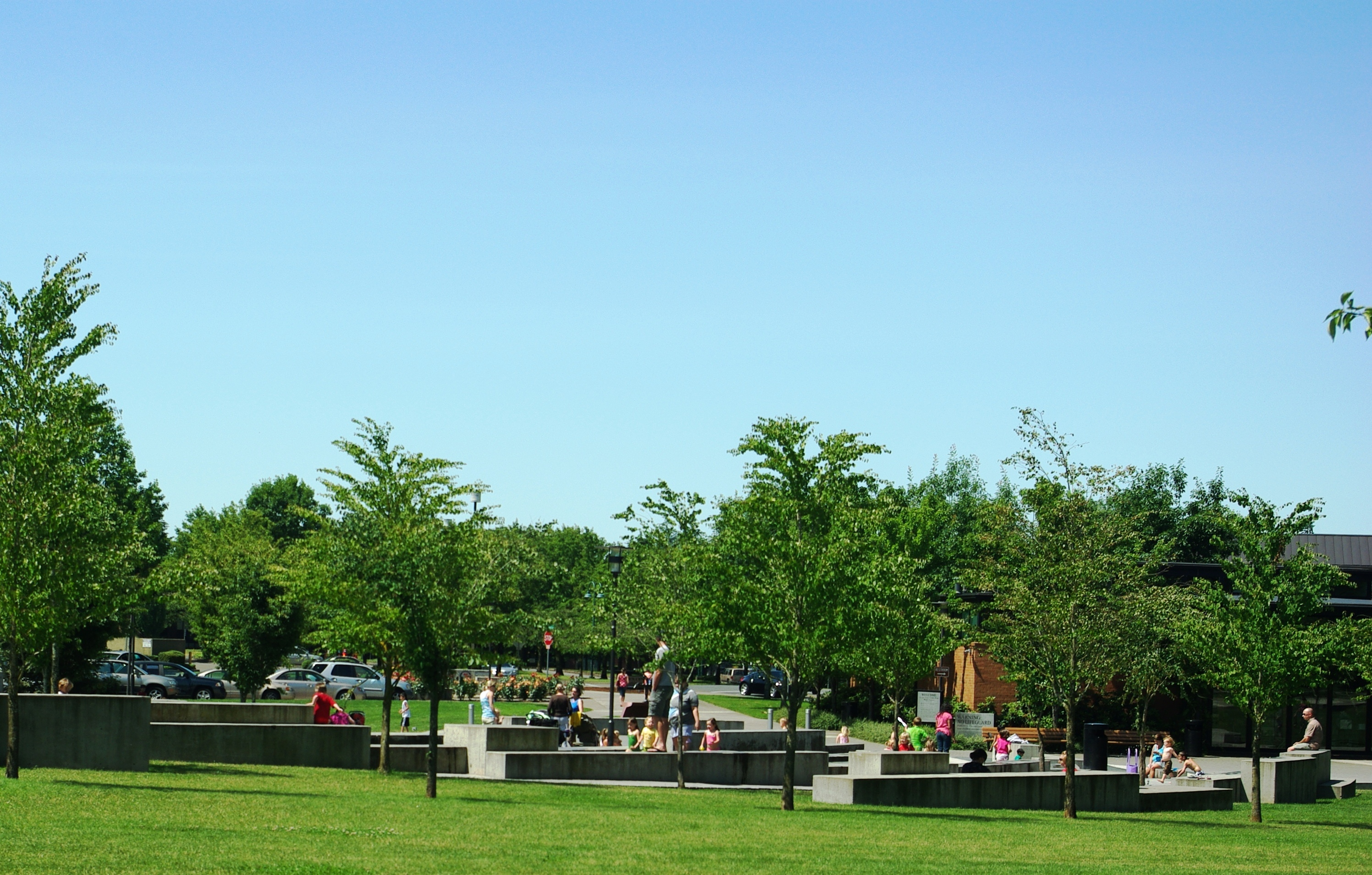
Water feature in the park

Town Center Park is used to stage many community events in Wilsonville. In May or June, Town Center Park is the site of the Wilsonville Festival of the Arts featuring local and regional artists in a variety of disciplines from pottery to photography. The festival began in 2000. During parts of July and into August the park is host to the Wilsonville Rotary Summer Concerts on Thursday nights, a free concert series. In August, the park plays host to the annual Fun in the Park Festival that includes concerts, children's exhibits, crafts, and food and wares vendors. The one-day event is part of Wilsonville Celebration Days and replaced Boone's Ferry Days in the year 2000, and draws in excess of 6,000 people to the park.

== See also ==
- Graham Oaks Nature Park
- Wilsonville Memorial Park
