= Garden of Remembrance =

Garden of Remembrance may be:

- Garden of Remembrance (Dublin), Ireland
- Garden of Remembrance (Belfast), Northern Ireland
- Garden of Remembrance, Lockerbie, Scotland, see: Pan Am Flight 103#Memorials and tributes
- Garden of Remembrance (Seattle)
- Garden of Remembrance (album), by Oneiroid Psychosis

== See also ==
- War memorial
