= Yashiro Japanese Garden =

Garden in Olympia, Washington

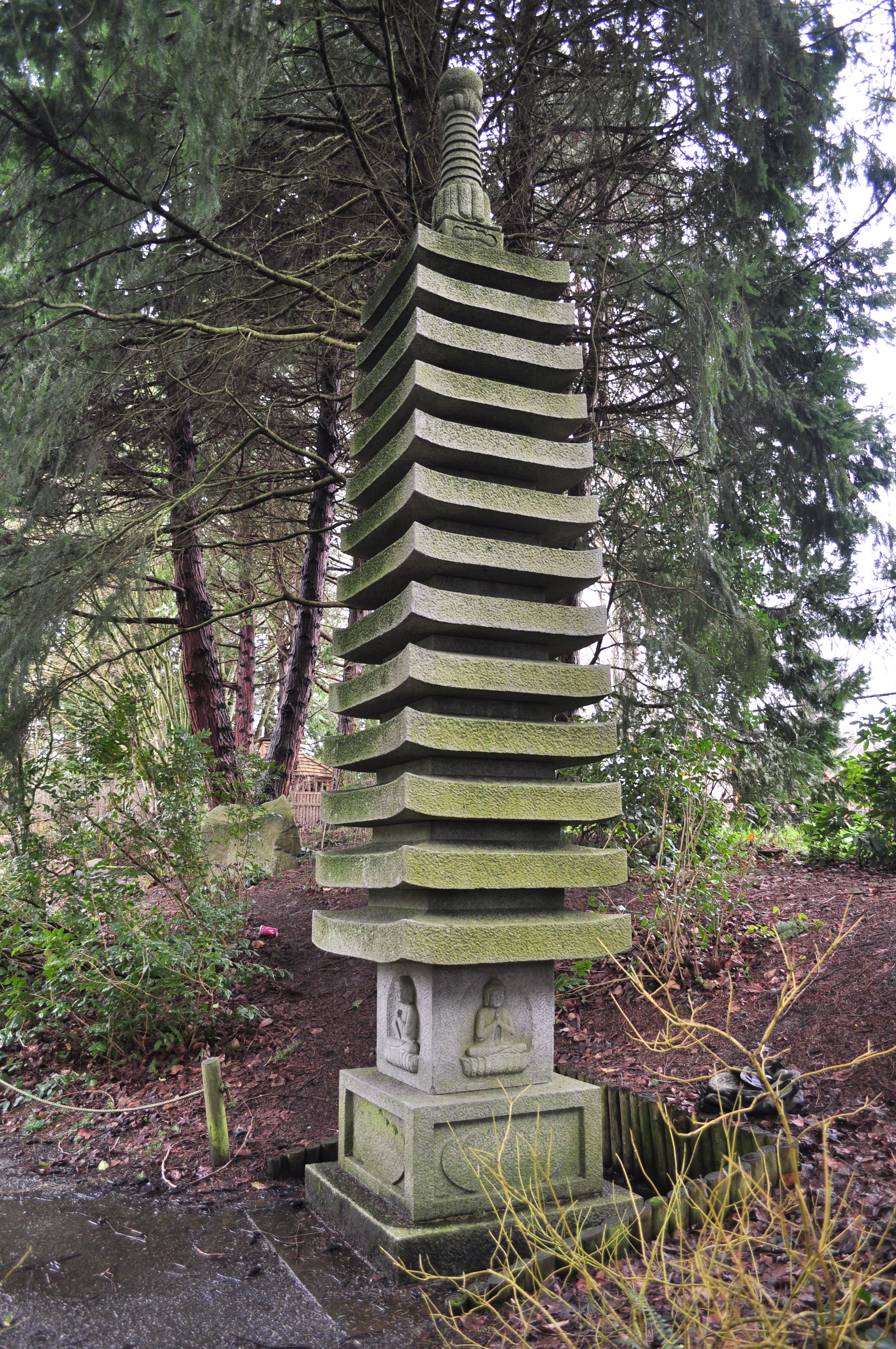
- Granite pagoda at Yashiro Japanese Garden
- Interactive map of Park location
- Type: Japanese garden
- Location: 1010 Plum Street SE; Olympia, Washington
- Coordinates: 47°02′25″N 122°53′29″W
- Area: 0.74 acres (3,000 m^{2})
- Opened: May 6, 1990
- Etymology: Sister city relationship, Yashiro, Japan
- Operator: City of Olympia
- Water: Koi pond
- Plants: Sculpted garden
- Collections: Public art
- Website: City of Olympia - Yashiro Japanese Garden

Yashiro Japanese Garden is a Japanese garden located in Olympia, Washington. Designed by Robert Murase and dedicated on May 6, 1990, the garden was created to symbolize the relationship between Olympia and its sister city of Yashiro, Japan.

After the grounds, which are part of a justice center campus, were sold in 2025, the garden is planned to be demolished in 2026. Certain features are to be potentially moved to a new site for the park.

== History ==
The park was created by the Olympia-Yashiro Sister City Association and opened on May 6, 1990 during a dedication ceremony. The garden was a combined seven-year planning and labor effort. Meant to honor the connection between sister cities, Olympia and Yashiro, the park was designed by Robert Murase. The garden was specifically designed to symbolize the importance of various interconnected motifs, such as human compassion and friendship, land stewardship, nature, and spirituality.

The garden is situated on the 10.47-acre (4.24 ha) campus of the Lee Creighton Justice Center, which was built in 1966, and is home to the Olympia Municipal Court; the property is also home to a tiny house village, a waste drop-off site, and a building to store evidence for the Olympia Police Department.

=== Closure and relocation ===
The gardens were part of a land sale to the Squaxin Indian Tribe in 2025. The park is planned to be razed for future development, necessitating a relocation.

The closure of Yashiro Japanese Garden is expected to be on June 1, 2026. Certain features of the park, in advance of its relocation, are to be saved and preserved, such as stone artworks and some plantings. As of April 2026, the future site of the garden, proposed to be smaller in scale, is unknown. The city of Olympia authorized $350,000, set aside from the sale of the center and site, to fund efforts to relocate the park. The parks department will have until the end of the year to remove "all elements" from the grounds.

== Features ==
The Japanese-styled garden features public art, an 18 foot (5.5 m)-tall granite pagoda, a sculpted garden and landscape with koi pond, and symbolic features between the sister cities. The town of Yashiro, now known as Katō, Hyōgo, donated several items, including stone lanterns and cedar entrance gates constructed in Japanese carpentry fashion without the use of nails.

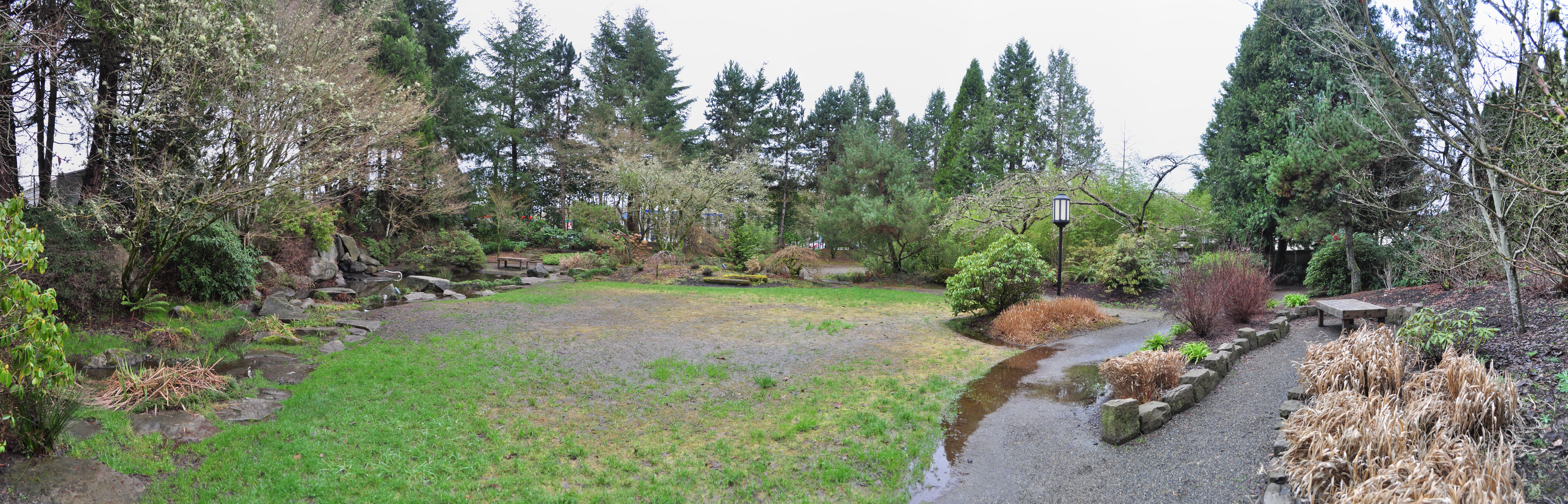
Panoramic of Yashiro Japanese Garden

== See also ==
- History of Olympia, Washington
- Parks and recreation in Olympia, Washington
