= Wilsonville Memorial Park =

Park in Wilsonville, Oregon, U.S.

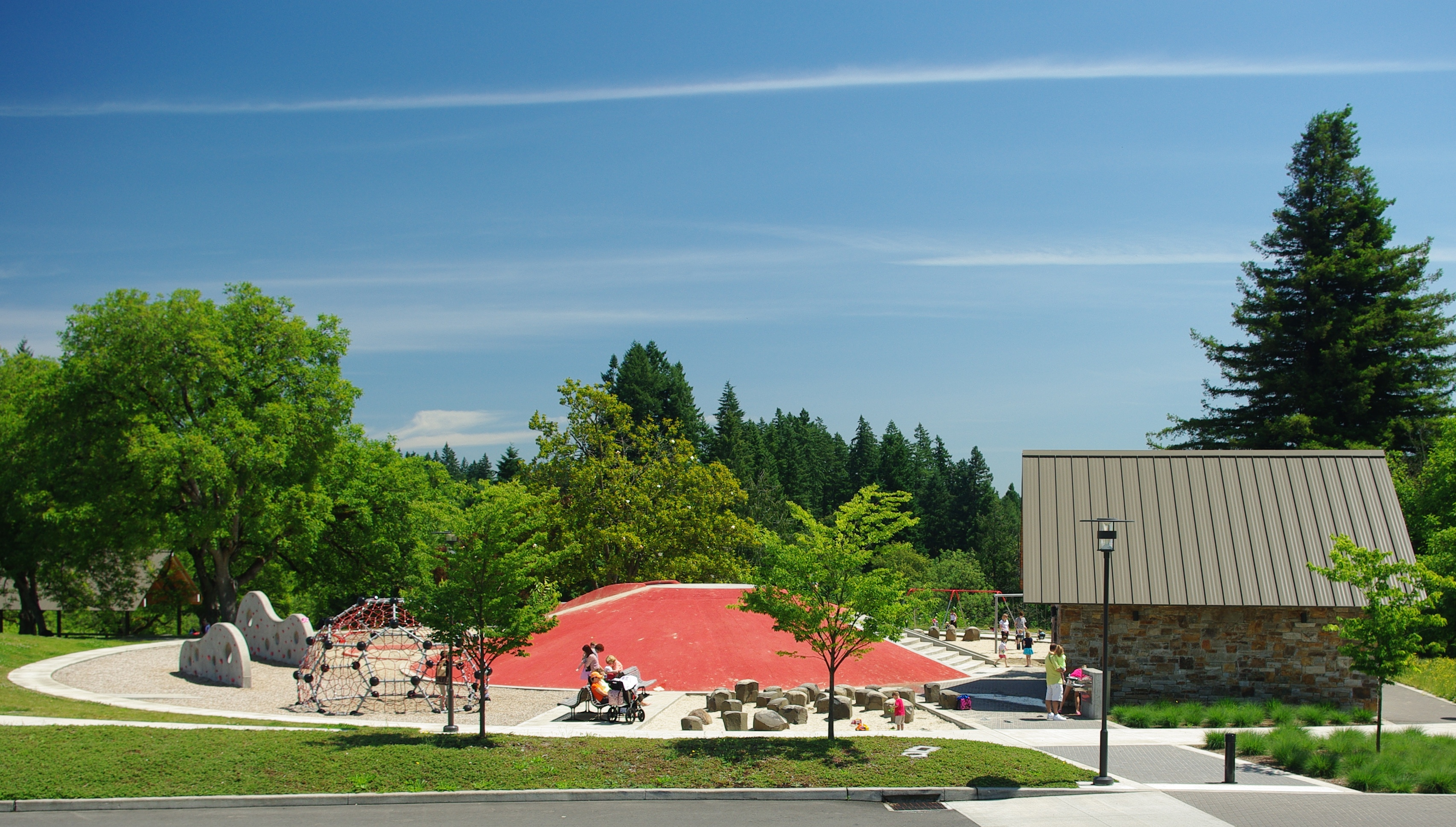
- Play area at Murase Plaza in Memorial Park
- Interactive map of Wilsonville Memorial Park
- Type: Public, city
- Location: Wilsonville, Oregon; United States
- Coordinates: 45°17′52″N 122°45′31″W
- Area: 126 acres (510,000 m^{2})
- Created: 1969
- Operator: Wilsonville Parks & Recreation
- Status: open
- Website: Memorial Park

Wilsonville Memorial Park is a large municipal park in Wilsonville, Oregon, United States. Opened in 1969, the 126-acre (51 ha) park is the largest and oldest in the city. Located off Wilsonville Road east of Interstate 5, the park includes a plaza with water features, athletic fields and courts, trails, a skatepark, picnic areas, a dog park, and playground equipment. Part of the park fronts the Willamette River and includes a public boat dock.

== History ==
Wilsonville residents voted to incorporate as a city in 1968, with the city forming the next year. That year the city purchased about 61 acres (25 ha) along the Willamette River on the east side of Interstate 5 to be used as a park, named Wilsonville Memorial Park. In June 1987, residents approved a bond measure to build a library and add 41.5 acres (16.8 ha) to Memorial Park. This land was located along the Willamette River west of the original part of the park and was purchased from Nike, Inc. for $1.1 million. The next year the city built new restrooms at the park near the river.

In January 1989, Wilsonville renamed the park as Phillip R. Balsiger Memorial Park in honor of the city's first mayor and promoter of incorporating the community. Balsiger, who died the year before, served four terms as mayor and worked to create and design the park. Some residents objected to the name change and lack of public participation in the decision. This led to a petition drive to restore the park's original name, which the city council voted in favor of restoring the original name in November 1989.

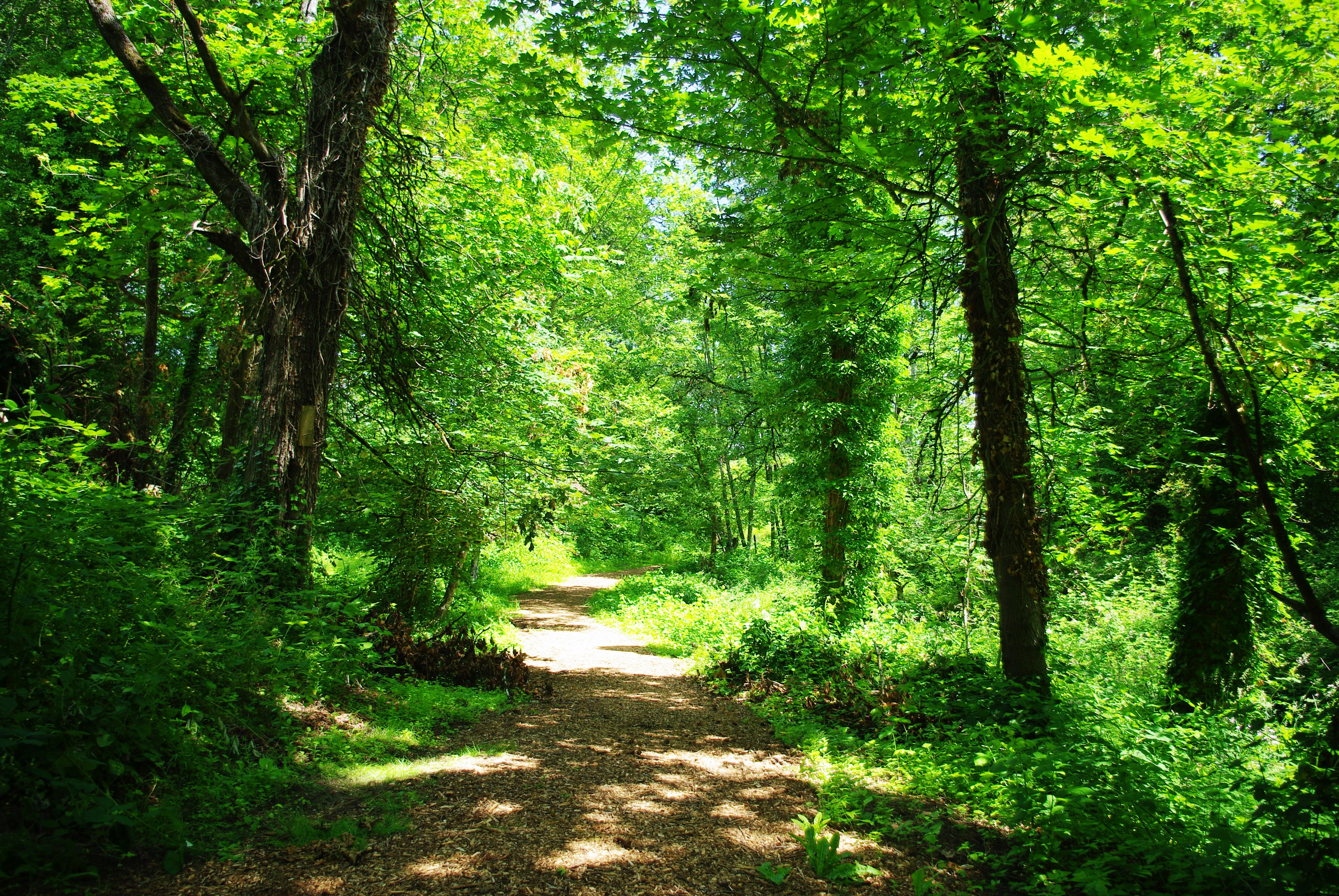
Trail and natural area at the park

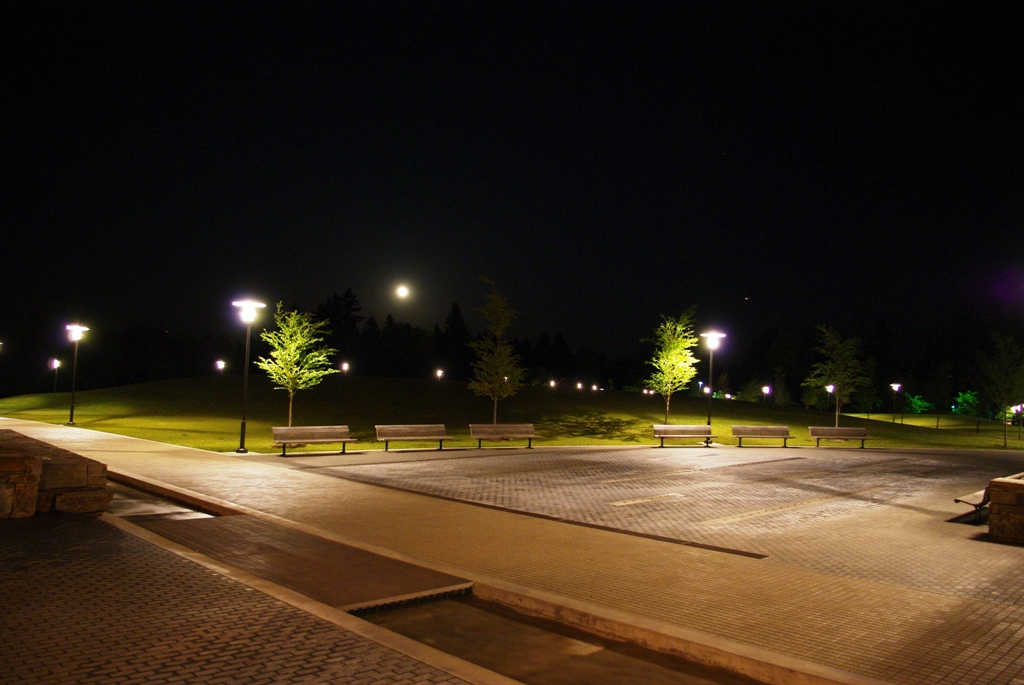
Murase Plaza at night

Wilsonville hired design firm Walker and Macy to create a master plan for the park in September 1990. At that time 40 of the 102 acres (0.41 km^{2}) in the park were undeveloped, with the developed portion containing four baseball/softball fields along with children's play equipment. In January 1991, the city approved plans to develop the park's western section. The first phase of this development was to include new roads, new parking lots, a playground, a lighted tennis court, and a softball field at a cost of almost $825,000. Wilsonville's city council approved $500,000 for the project in May 1991, but issues with drainage in the park created problems with the plans. In July 1992, plans were finalized and construction began on some of the original improvements. Costing about $423,000, the improvements included expanding the drainage system, a new ball field, and preparations for adding a playground and snack bar.

Wilsonville purchased the Boozier property at the north end of the park in 1993, land totaling 22 acres (8.9 ha). City voters rejected a $940,000 bond measure in 1995 that would have added more athletic fields to the park along with an amphitheater. In 1996, a Boy Scout Eagle Project re-opened the community garden at Memorial Park after the original garden program ended in the 1980s due to lack of interest. Later in 1996, a full-size and half-size basketball courts were added to the park after donations by Nike and Hollywood Entertainment, who both had large operations in the city at that time. In April 1998, the city approved adding a skatepark at Memorial Park north of the tennis courts. The skatepark opened in 2000, paid for in part by private donations.

In 2000, the city started Wilsonville Celebration Days to replace the Boones Ferry Days, with the new event centered on activities at Memorial Park, as the old event had as well. Beginning in 2001, the city has entertained proposals for building an aquatic center in Memorial Park. A new city hall was proposed for the city to be located next to the northern end of the park near Wilsonville Road in 2002. However, citizen opposition led to the scrapping of that plan and recall attempts against the mayor and two city councilors. A new city hall opened in September 2006 a few blocks north of Memorial Park.

During the summer of 2006, Murase Plaza was opened at the northwest corner of the park. Originally named City Center Park, the area added a water feature and amphitheater to Memorial Park. In June 2006, the water features at Murase Plaza were temporarily closed due to unhealthy water. The city purchased 11 acres (45,000 m^{2}) of land across Wilsonville Road in November 2007 for $4.2 million in order to build an affordable senior housing complex. Most of this land is wetlands and has slopes that cannot be used for the complex, which will be added to Memorial Park. In September 2008, the Stein Homestead Barn re-opened after nearly $430,000 in restorations and improvements.

== Amenities ==
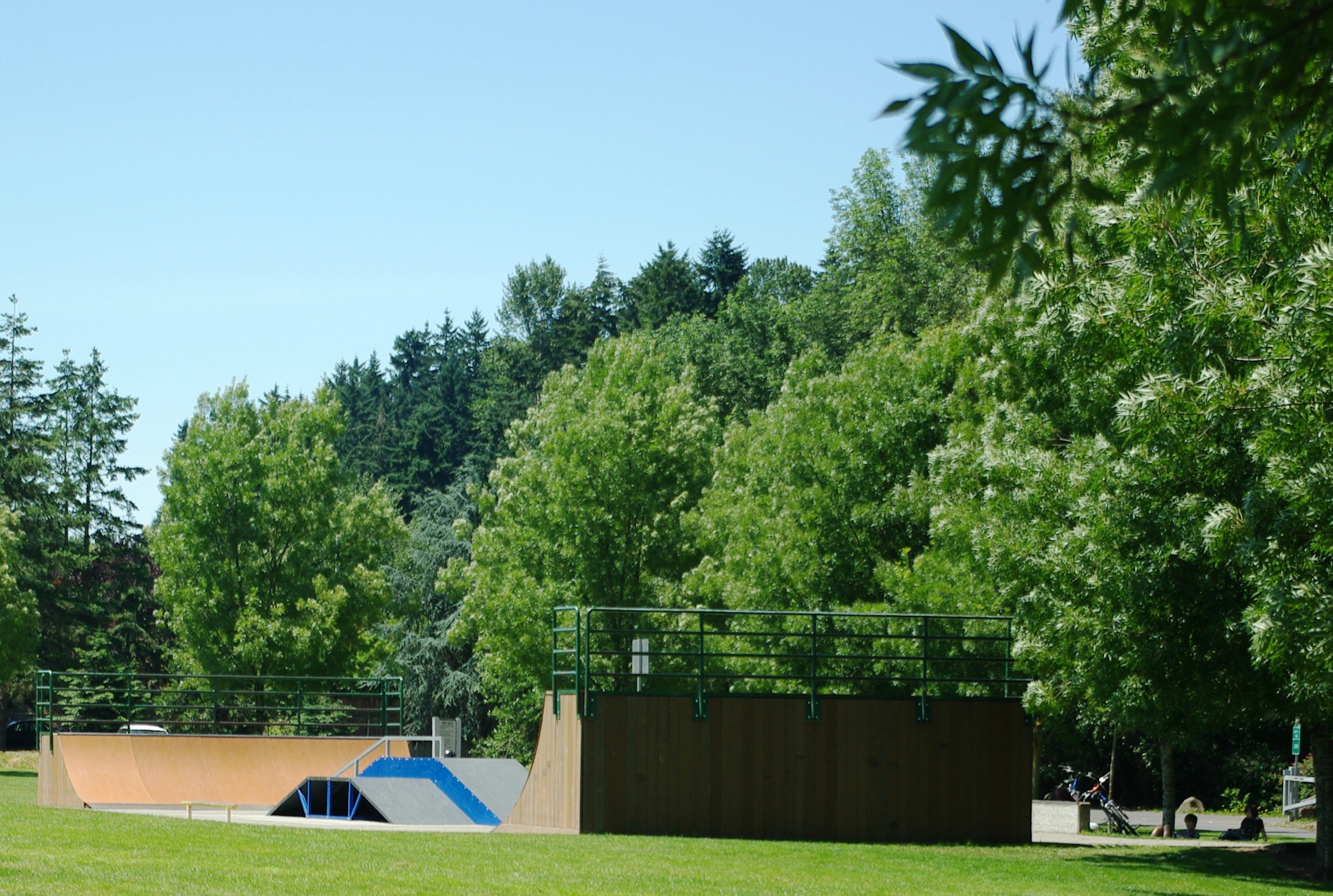
Skatepark in Memorial Park

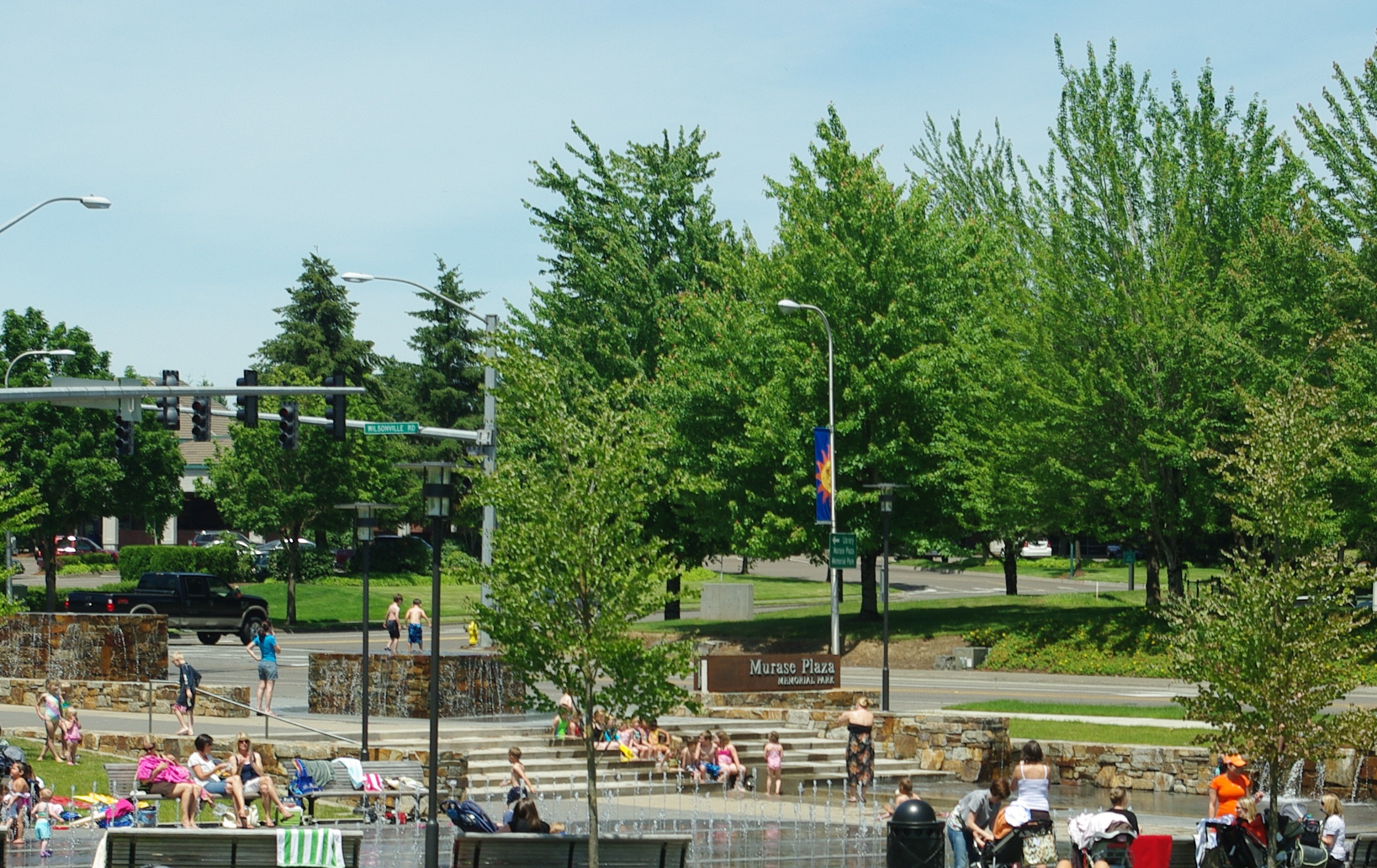
Interactive water feature in Murase Plaza

Memorial Park at 126 acres (51 ha) is Wilsonville's largest park, and is also the oldest park. Located between the Willamette River (including 0.5 miles (0.80 km) of river frontage) and Wilsonville Road, Boeckman Creek flows through the park on its way to emptying into the Willamette. The park includes a trail system, athletic facilities, forested areas, picnic areas, parking, restrooms, and a skatepark among other features. Murase Plaza is in the northwest corner and includes an amphitheater and water features. The plaza was named after Robert Murase who designed the plaza and died before it opened.

Athletic facilities at the park include several fields and courts. Courts include one full-sized basketball court, a half-sized basketball court, two tennis courts, and a beach volleyball court. The fields include one baseball field, four softball fields, and three soccer fields that overlay the softball diamonds' outfields. Memorial Park also includes the only skatepark in the city.

Other developed amenities in the park include picnic shelters, a dog park, restrooms, parking lots, picnic tables, a community center, a boat dock, and children's play equipment. Memorial Park has two main picnic shelters, the River Shelter with a capacity of 200 people and the smaller Forest Shelter that seats 150. A third shelter is located at the athletic fields. The dog park area is the only off-leash area in the city. Stein Homestead Barn serves as a community space used for a variety of events. The wooden barn was built in 1901 by Gustave Stein and renovated in 2008, with improvements that included adding a sink and restoring the original shake roof.

Natural areas include forested portions, wetlands, and a community garden. A portion of the park on the northern edge is forested and nicknamed as Owl Woods due to the presence of a great horned owl. Other birds that inhabit the park include wrens, pileated woodpeckers, grosbeaks, red-tailed hawks, and bald eagles on occasion. The park includes the Ernest Kolbe Giant Sequoia, selected as one of the city's heritage trees.

== Events ==
During the summers the park is home to the city's Art in the Park program for children. The crafts program is held once a week and started in 2004. In July and August each year, the park is the host of Movies in the Park. The program shows free movies on select Fridays during those months. An annual Easter Egg hunt is held at the park as well. Wilsonville Celebration Days used to be held at the park, but is now staged at Town Center Park.

== See also ==
- Graham Oaks Nature Park
