= Rose Quarter Veterans Memorial =

Veterans memorial in Portland, Oregon

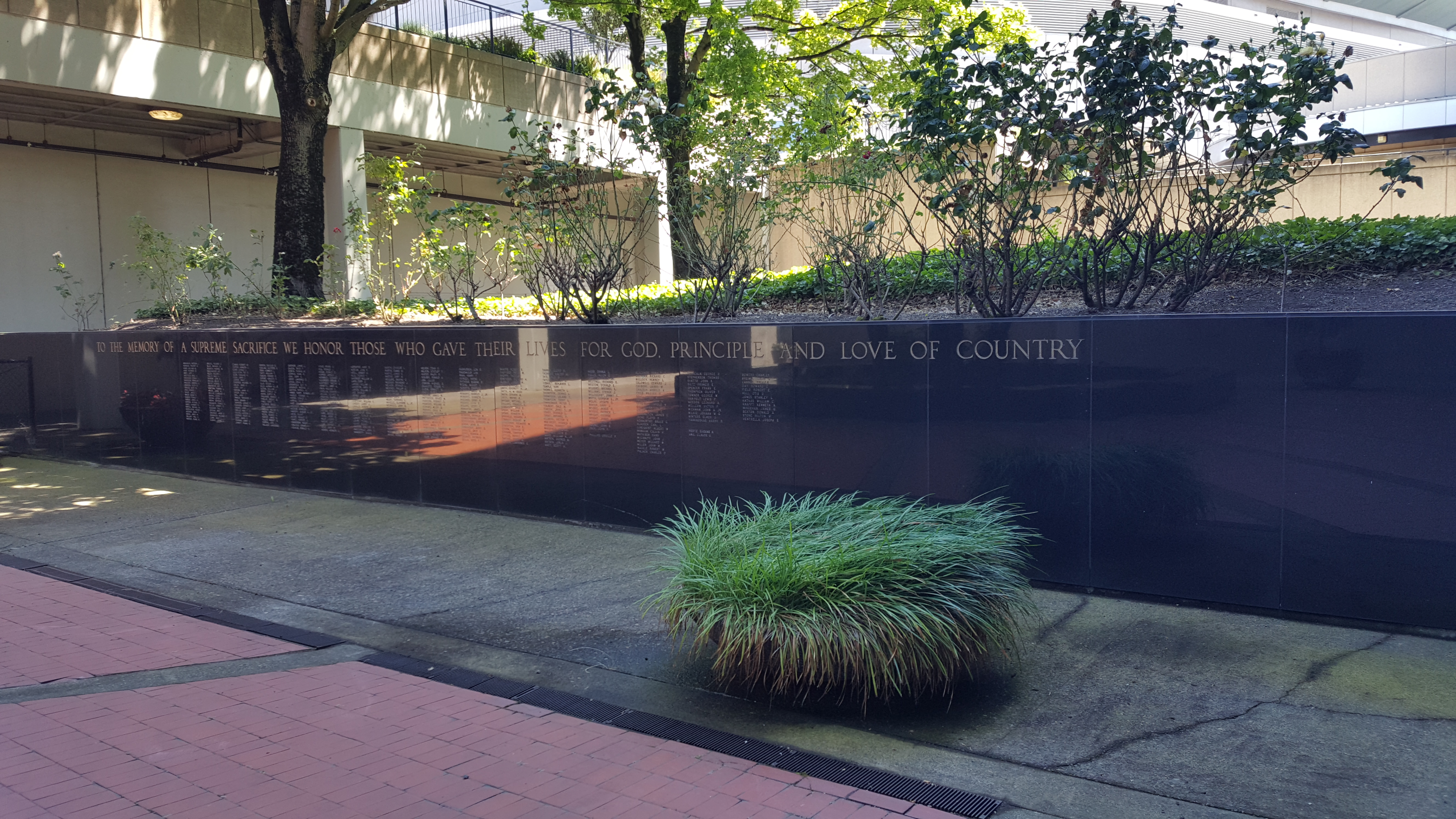
- A section of the original memorial
- Interactive map of Rose Quarter Veterans Memorial
- Location: Rose Quarter campus, Portland, Oregon
- Coordinates: 45°31′58″N 122°40′08″W
- Material: Granite
- Dedicated date: September 30, 1962

The Rose Quarter Veterans Memorial, formerly the Rose Quarter War Memorials and originally the Memorial Honor Roll, was a memorial on the Rose Quarter campus in Portland, Oregon honoring soldiers, sailors, and airmen who gave their lives while fighting for the United States Armed Forces. It was removed in 2022 and is currently planned to be moved and rebuilt.

== History ==
=== South Park Blocks memorial ===
After World War II, the city erected a billboard in the South Park Blocks which listed the names of local casualties. The billboard remained in the park for over a decade, until the Memorial Coliseum was constructed.

=== Original memorials (1962-2022) ===
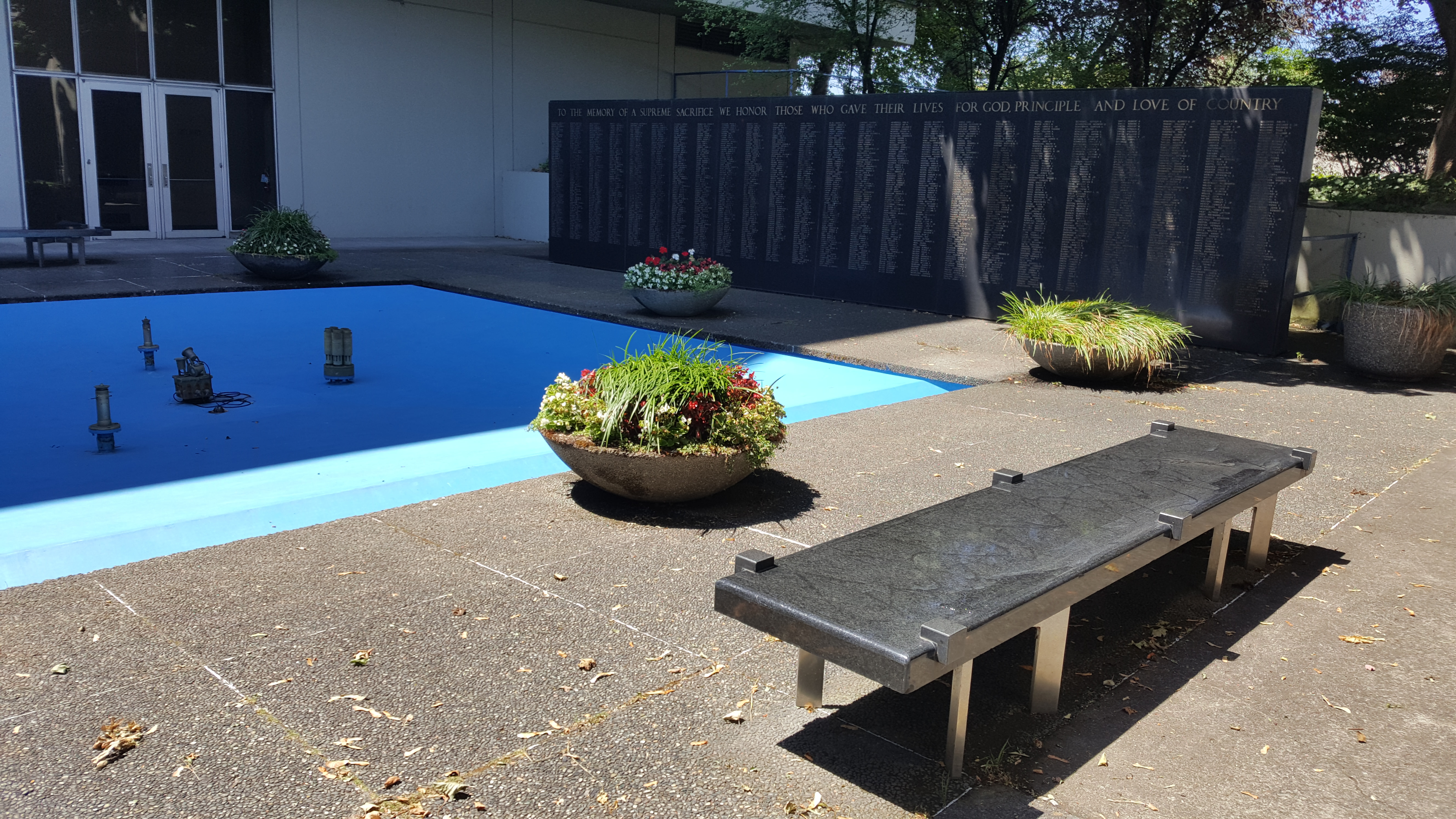
A section of the original memorial

The original memorial consisted of a 1962 memorial wall listing servicemembers from Portland, defined as living within a 15-mile radius of the city center, who had died in war. It contained 1,667 names. The top of the wall was engraved with a memorial quote: "To the memory of a supreme sacrifice we honor those who gave their lives for God, principle and love of country." A 10-square foot pool was constructed next to the wall. The memorial was dedicated by mayor Terry Schrunk on September 30, 1962. The family of Medal of Honor recipient David R. Kingsley, who is listed on the wall, were present at the dedication. On October 23, 1977, a second wall was added, primarily to add names of deceased from the Korean War and Vietnam War.

In 2021, the walls were removed and placed into storage after falling into disrepair.

=== New memorial (under construction) ===
In spring of 2025, the city initiated an advisory group, titled the Veterans Memorial Coliseum Renovation Memorials Project Advisory Group, to recommend plans for the future of the memorial. They met six times over the next four months and on June 20, 2025 released a report entitled Recommendations for the Veterans Memorials and Honor Rolls at the Veterans Memorial Coliseum. In it, they recommended the walls be relocated to the main entry plaza of the Coliseum and included design recommendations.

On April 8, 2026, the city opened the project up for proposals. In August 2026, NNA Landscape Artists created a final proposed design and narrative. A contract is currently being negotiated and is expected in fall 2026.

== See also ==
- Oregon Korean War Memorial
- Oregon Vietnam Veterans Memorial
