= Robert Murase =

Japanese-American landscape architect (1938–2005)

Robert Kazuo Murase
- Born: September 9, 1938; San Francisco, California
- Died: July 19, 2005 (aged 66); Portland, Oregon
- Occupation: landscape architect
- Years active: 1965–2005

Robert Kazuo Murase (Japanese: 村瀬 一雄, September 9, 1938 – July 19, 2005) was an American landscape architect. He worked throughout the Pacific Northwest in the field of landscape design.

== Biography ==
Murase was born in San Francisco as a third generation Japanese-American to Tokiichi (George) and Yoneko Murase in 1938. At the age of three, following the signing of Executive Order 9066, Murase and his family were detained along with several thousand San Francisco Bay Area Japanese-Americans at the Tanforan horse-racing track in San Bruno, California before the family were split, with George, Yoneko, and Robert sent to internment at Topaz while his widowed grandmother (Kuni) and aunts Mieko and Grace were sent to Tule Lake. At the time, his three uncles were serving in the military. They returned to San Francisco at the end of World War II.

Murase graduated from the University of California, Berkeley in 1963 with a master's degree in landscape architecture. He interned with Lawrence Halprin and was hired by Royston, Hanamoto, Alley, and Abey (RHAA) in 1965. To gain experience in the landscape architecture field, Murase moved to Japan in 1967, where he maintained a practice for almost 10 years, conducting garden research at Kyoto University.

He then returned the United States and moved to Portland, Oregon, where he taught at the University of Oregon's Department of Landscape Architecture for three years before joining EDAW (now AECOM) in 1980. In 1982, he formed Murase Associates in Portland, and opened a Seattle office in 1989. His firm went on to win about 50 design awards. He was named a fellow member of the American Society of Landscape Architects in 1994 and was an honorary member of American Institute of Architects, Seattle chapter.

Murase died in July 2005 due to complications of a heart attack. He was survived by his mother, wife, and three children; one of his sons, Scott, is a principal in the Murase Associates landscape architecture firm.

== Career ==
Robert was known as a true artist who had soul, where his works were poetical and often spiritual due to the emotional thought process he had with designing sites. "I always considered him a poet of stone and water," stated by John Nesholm of LMN Architects.

Murase is well known for skillful and sublime compositions of stone, evident of an empathetic relation to the medium. However, he was arguably more adept at infusing sites with a sense of the spiritual (e.g. mystery, stillness, serenity, power, primordiality, reverence) despite whatever commotion surrounded it. This may be attributed to over a decade of self-directed exploration of Japanese artistic traditions, most notably garden design.

Murase influenced others by lecturing at universities, museums, and other institutions.

=== Influences ===
Murase found roots in his own ancestry where he incorporated the elements that are often found in Japanese gardens and mimicked nature. His signature material was stone, strongly influenced from stone sculptor Isamu Noguchi. In addition, he was greatly influenced by the artistic traditions of the Muromachi Period of 16th century Japan, when Zen flourished (subsequently influencing, transforming or leading to the creation of numerous art forms).

"What attracts me to Japanese gardens lies in the essence of quietness which they express; their meditative emptiness, the illusion of nature, the effects of shadow and filtered light, and their stark simplicity. These gardens provide a sense of "wabi," the absence of any ostentatious element, and a sense of humility and melancholy. There is a dark, mysterious quality about them, an undiscoverable unknown which goes beyond our individual small self, which could be described as "yugen" in Japanese. These are some of the qualities I strive to express in the design process", Murase elaborates on Japanese garden design and its influence on his process.

=== Notable projects ===
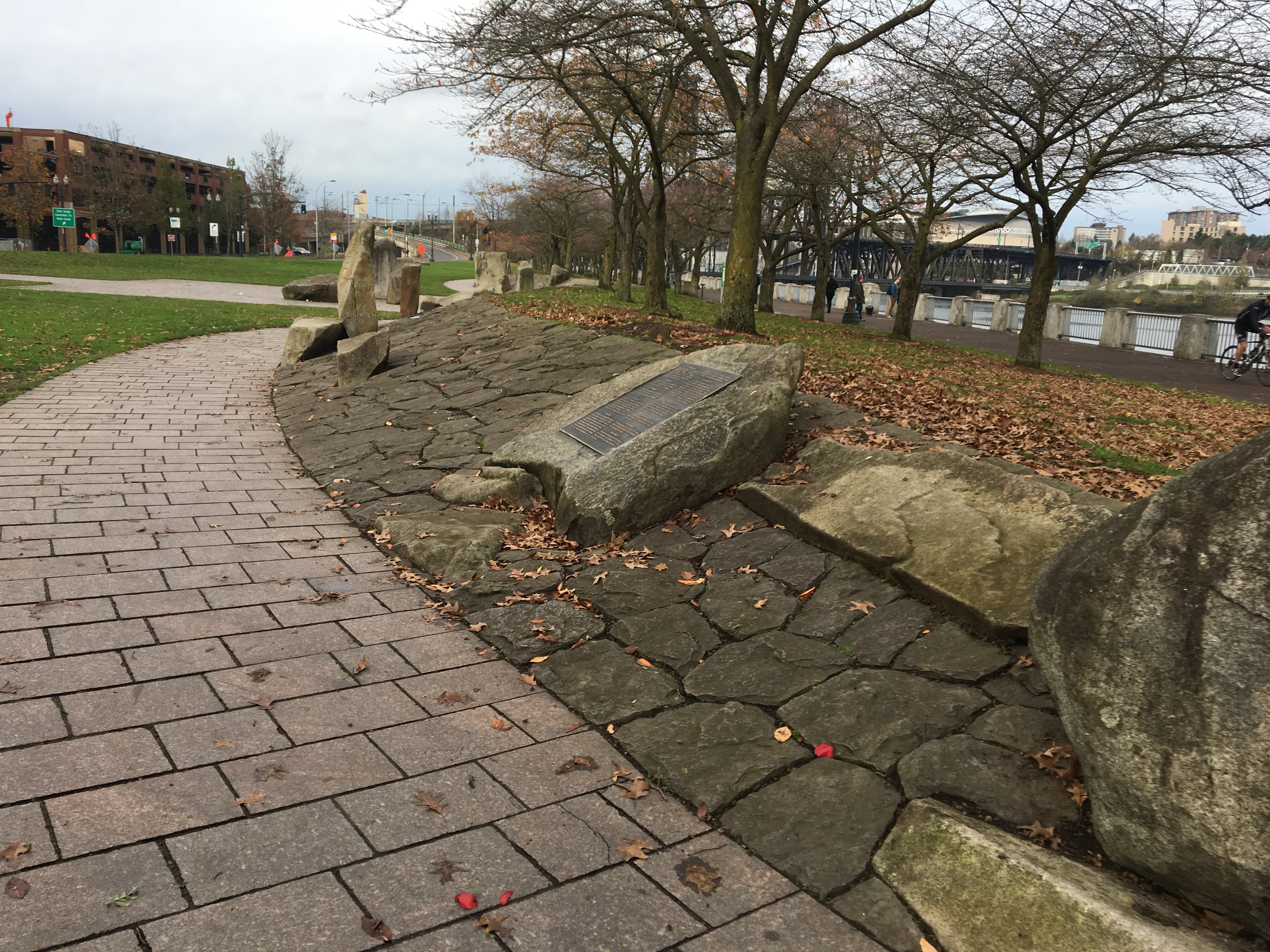
Japanese American Historical Plaza (2016)

Murase took pride in many of his projects; but, according to colleagues, he was proudest of the Japanese American Historical Plaza along Portland's waterfront. The plaza was strongly influenced by the internment of 110,000 Japanese-Americans during World War II. He authored Touching the Stones, tracing 100 years of Japanese American history to celebrate the dedication of the Japanese American Historical Plaza.

Other projects include:

- Astoria Waterfront Redevelopment, Astoria, Oregon.
- Esther Short Park in Vancouver.
- Garden of Remembrance downtown Seattle.
- Goose Hollow/SW Jefferson St MAX light rail station, Portland, Oregon.
- Grand Canyon transit center.
- Japanese American Historical Plaza, Portland, Oregon.
- Japanese American Museum in Los Angeles.
- Murase Plaza at Wilsonville Memorial Park, Wilsonville, Oregon.
- OMSI's bioswales, Portland, Oregon.
- Oregon Convention Center's forecourt, Portland, Oregon.
- Pier 69 headquarters of the Port of Seattle.
- St. Croix National Scenic Riverway in Wisconsin.
- Sumitomo Museum in Kyoto, Japan.
- Sunset Transit Center landscape, near Portland, Oregon.
- Town Center Park, Wilsonville, Oregon.
- Willamette River Water Treatment Plant Park, Wilsonville, Oregon.
- Yashiro Japanese Garden, Olympia, Washington.
