= Oregon Holocaust Memorial =

Holocaust memorial in Portland, Oregon

Coordinates: 45°31′20″N 122°42′13″W

- Oregon
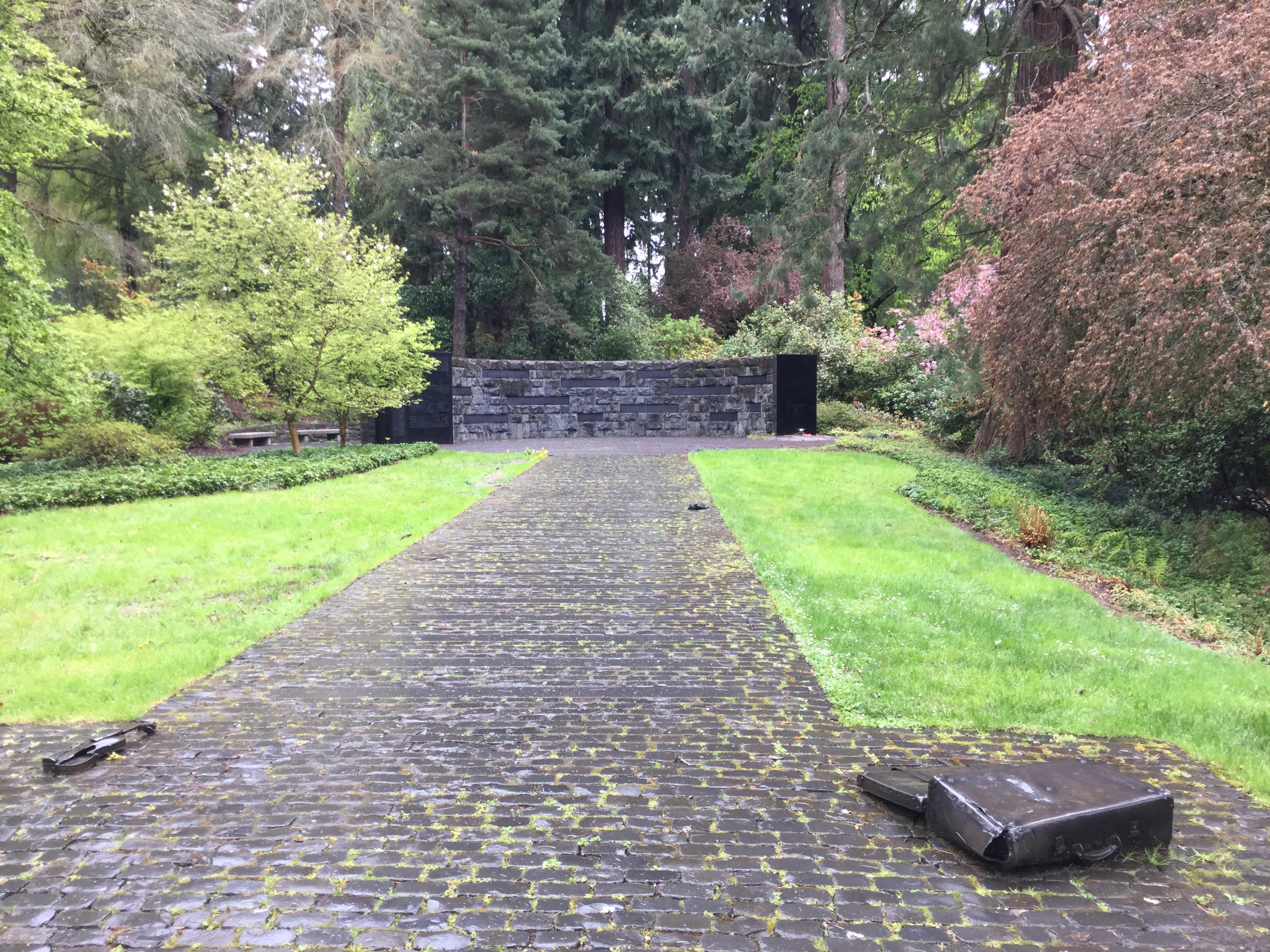
- The monument in 2022. Bronze items like the suitcase and violin shown in the bottom left and right are strewn around the area symbolizing life interrupted.
- For victims of the Holocaust
- Unveiled: August 29, 2004
- Location: near Portland, Oregon

The Oregon Holocaust Memorial is an outdoor memorial dedicated to victims of the Holocaust. Located in Portland, Oregon's Washington Park, the memorial was dedicated on August 29, 2004. It is owned by the American Jewish Committee and the idea for a memorial was proposed in 1994 by Alice Kern and a local group of Holocaust survivors that met through the Oregon Holocaust Resource Center. According to Fodor's, the memorial is open daily from dawn to dusk and admission is free of charge.

== Design ==
The memorial features a stone bench with wrought iron gating around a cobblestone circle. Scattered bronzes of common objects such as shoes, glasses, and a suitcase represent items left behind by those persecuted during the Holocaust. A cobblestone walkway, with granite bars simulating railroad tracks, leads to a wall containing a history of the Holocaust as well as quotes from survivors. The memorial also contains a "soil vault panel", which covers soil and ash from six extermination camps of the Holocaust (Auschwitz-Birkenau, Bełżec, Chelmno, Majdanek, Treblinka, and Sobibor) brought back by local residents. Engraved on the back of the wall are the names of people who died in the camps, as well as the names of their surviving relatives in Oregon and Southwest Washington. Author and designer John Laursen created the lettering for the memorial. Other design team members included artists Tad Savinar and Paul Sutinen, landscape architects John Warner, Marianne Zarkin and Marlene Salon, and historian Marshall Lee.

== Construction ==
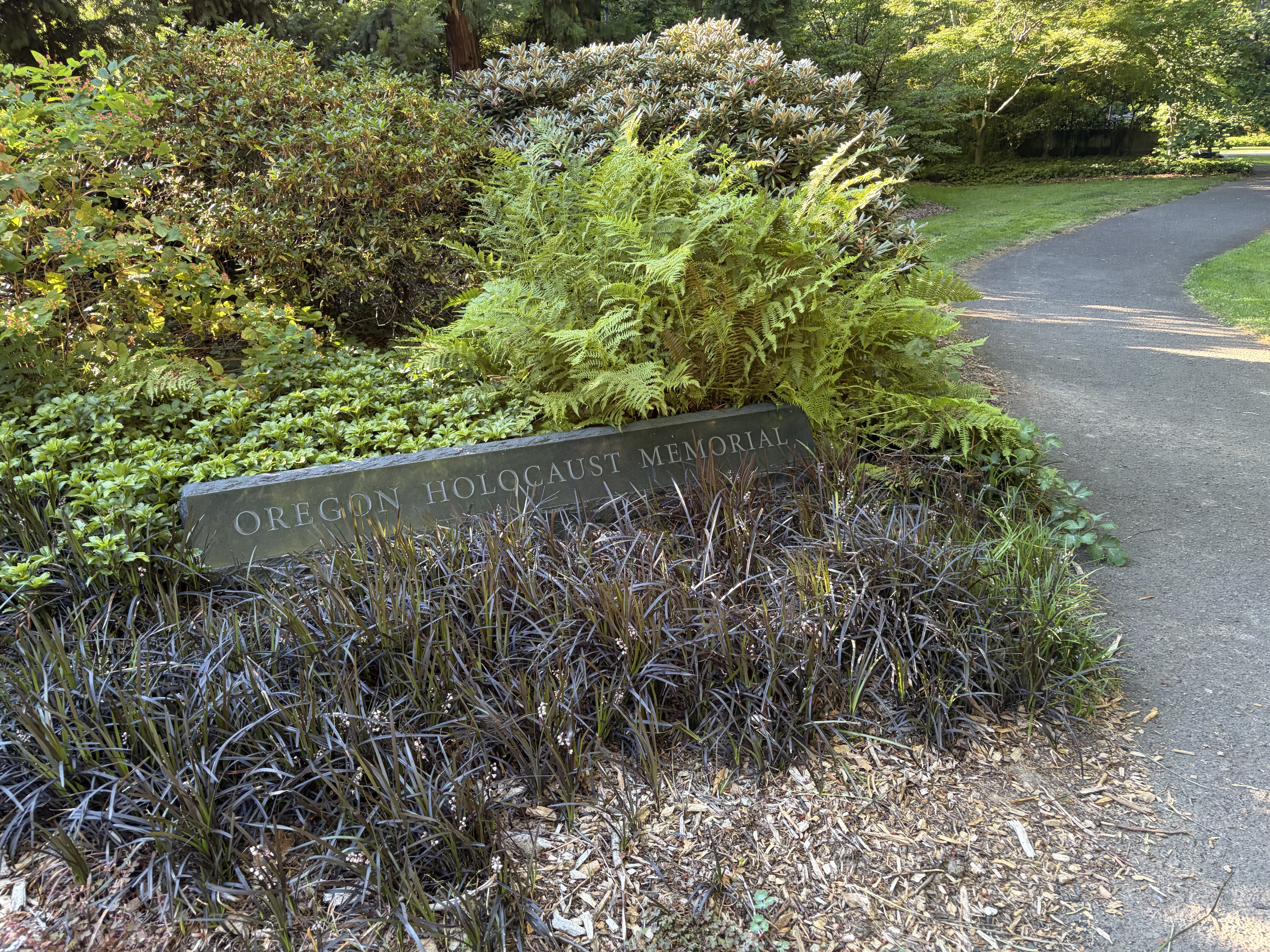
One of the two entrance signs

The total estimated cost of construction was $800,000, funded by grants and private donations. The primary contractor for the project was Oregon's Walsh Construction Company. Minnesota-based Coldspring Granite Company provided granite for the memorial.

== History ==
The memorial was vandalized in 2021.

The project was delayed for several years due to land use appeals by the Arlington Heights neighborhood. Citing parking, traffic, and neighborhood character concerns, the appeal eventually landed at the Oregon Supreme Court.

== See also ==
- 2004 in art
- List of Holocaust memorials and museums
- Oregon Korean War Memorial
