= Oregon Vietnam Veterans Memorial =

Vietnam War memorial in Portland, Oregon

- Oregon
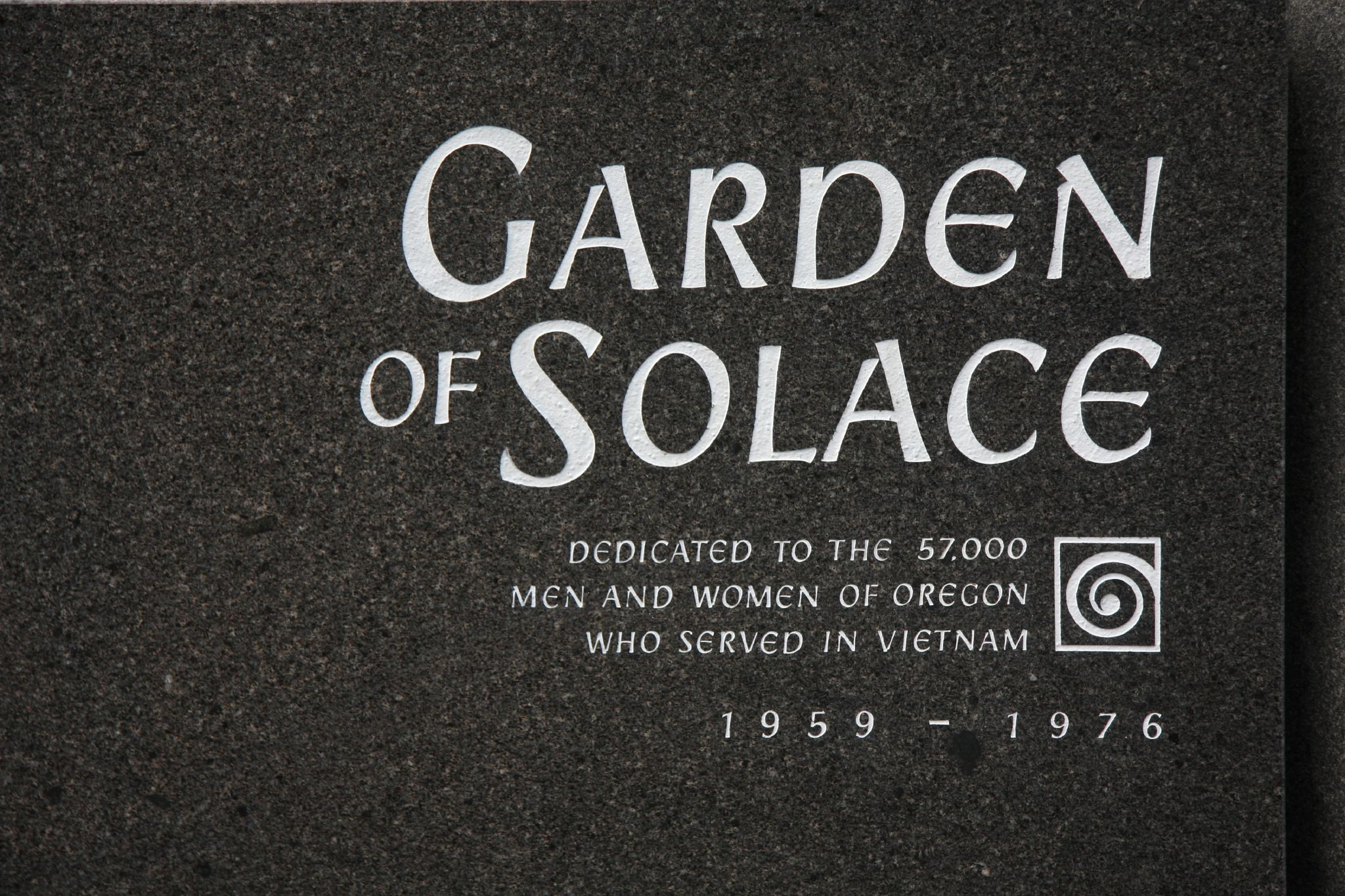
- Vietnam Memorial Sign
- For Vietnam War
- Established: 1987
- Location: 45.5120°N 122.71857°W near Portland, Oregon, USA

The Oregon Vietnam Veterans Memorial is an 8-acre (0.03 km^{2}) outdoor war memorial dedicated to Oregonians who served in the Vietnam War. It is located in Portland, Oregon's Washington Park at 45.5120°N 122.71857°W. The memorial was dedicated in 1987, inspired in 1982 by visits to the national Vietnam Veterans Memorial by five veterans and the parents of a Marine killed in Vietnam. Landscape architecture firm Walker Macy of Portland designed the memorial, while construction labor and materials were almost entirely volunteer donations.The font used in the memorial was created for the exclusive use of the Memorial. It was designed by Janis Price, and is called Hoyt, in recognition of the Arboretum.

The memorial is located in the Hoyt Arboretum, adjacent to the World Forestry Center and the Oregon Zoo. The nearby trail system connects to Forest Park and is close to the International Rose Test Garden and the Portland Japanese Garden. It is accessible by U.S. Route 26 and by Portland's MAX light rail system, which has a station in Washington Park.

== Gallery ==
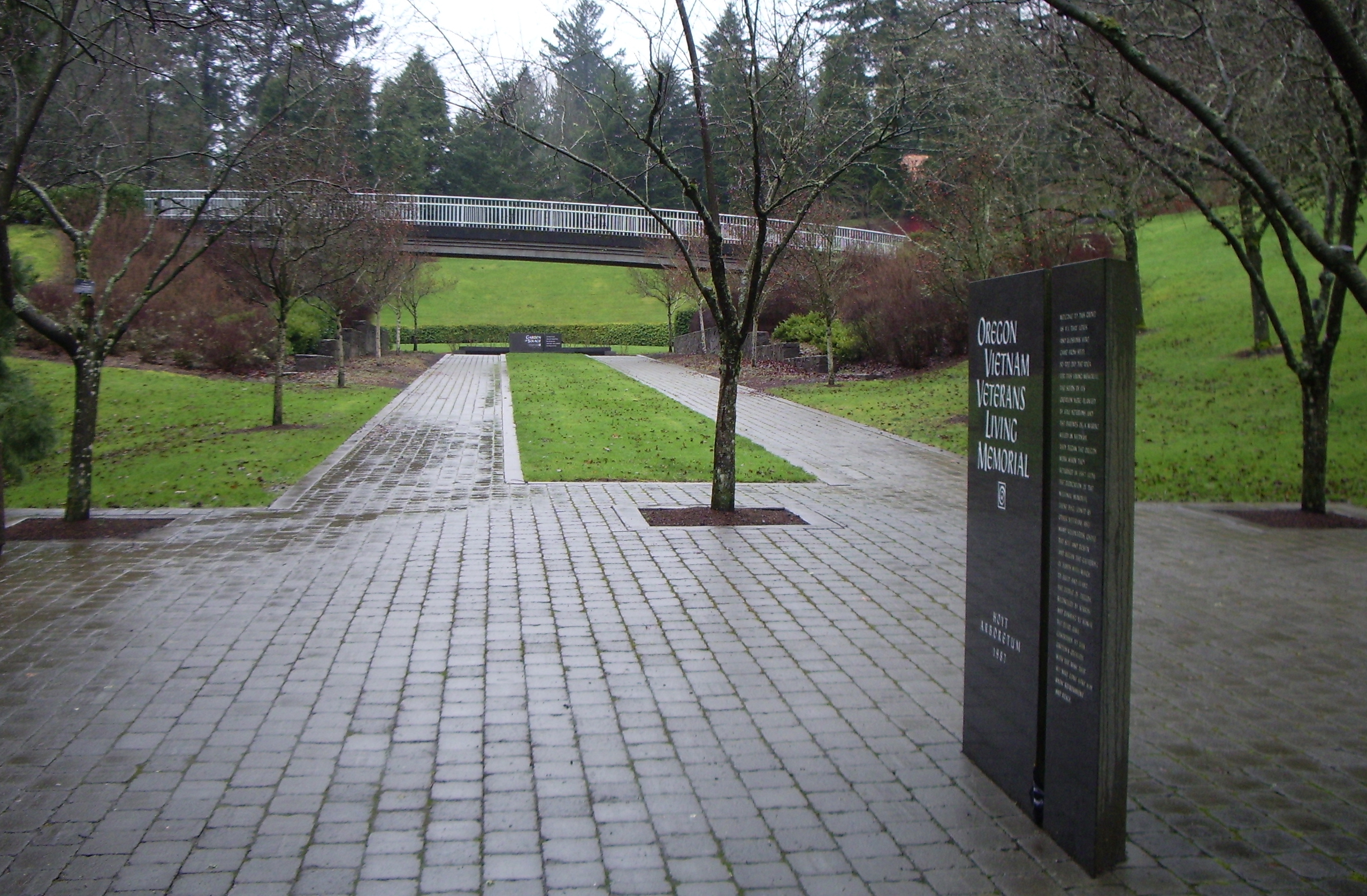
Entrance

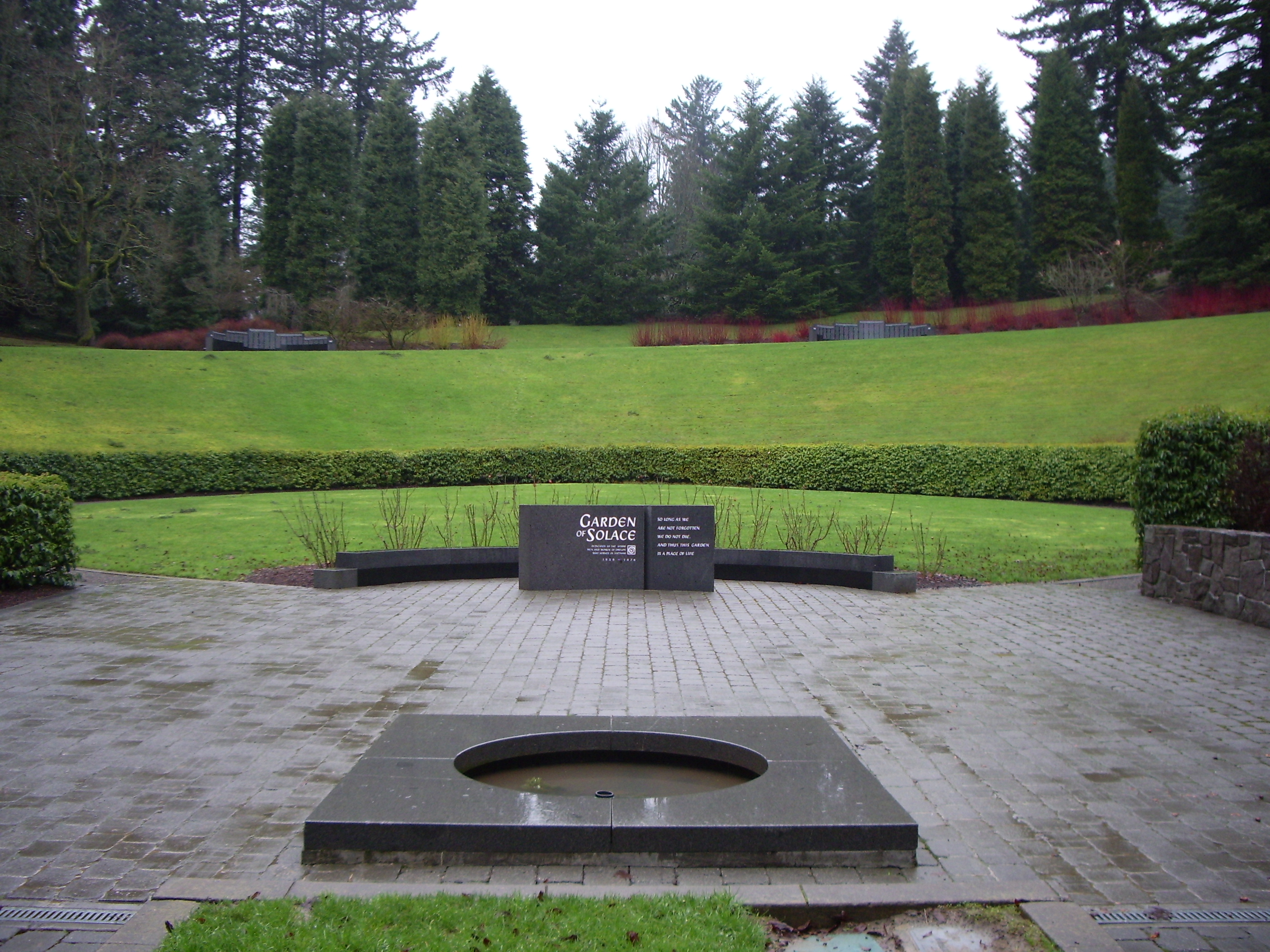
Garden of Solace

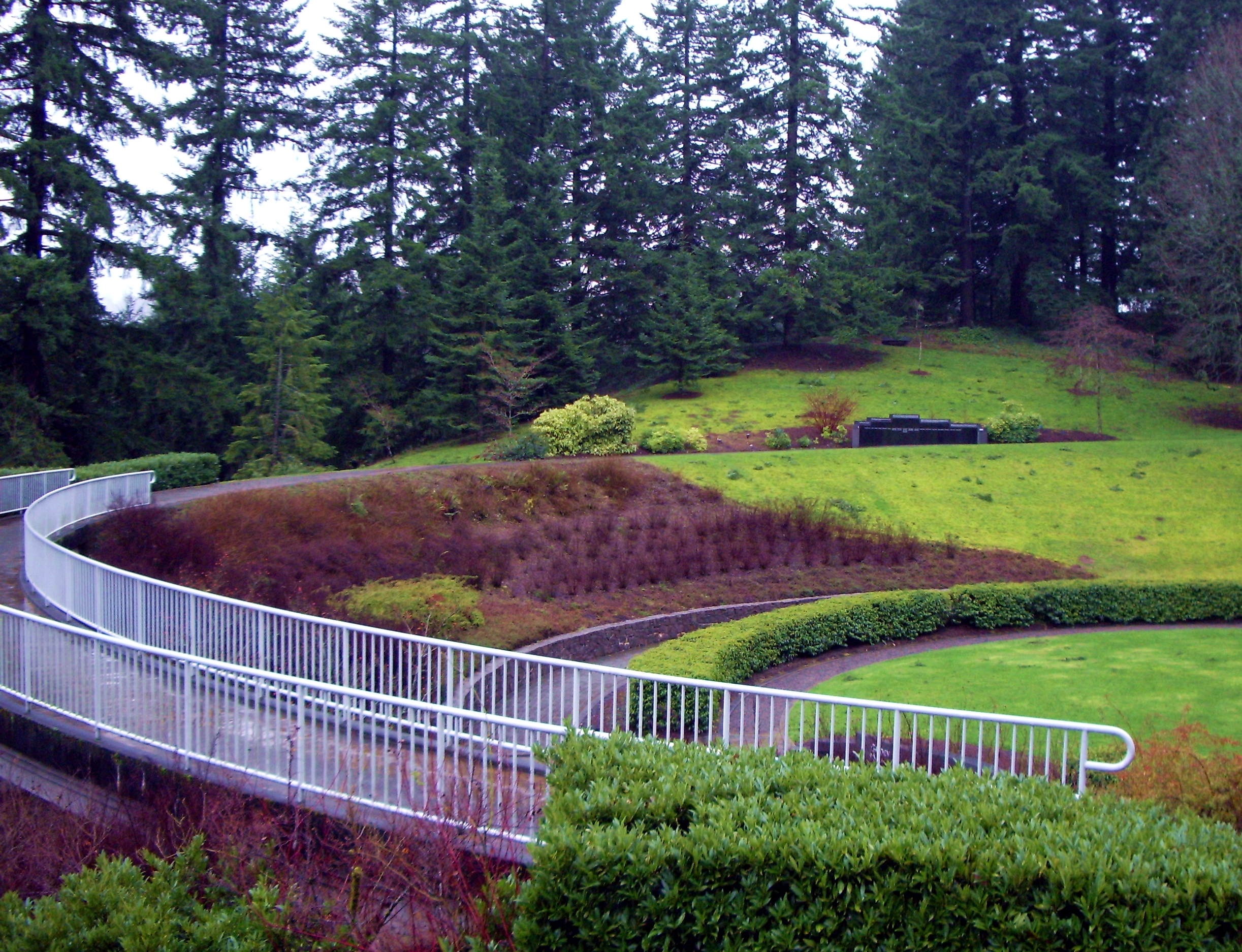
Amphitheater and first memorial

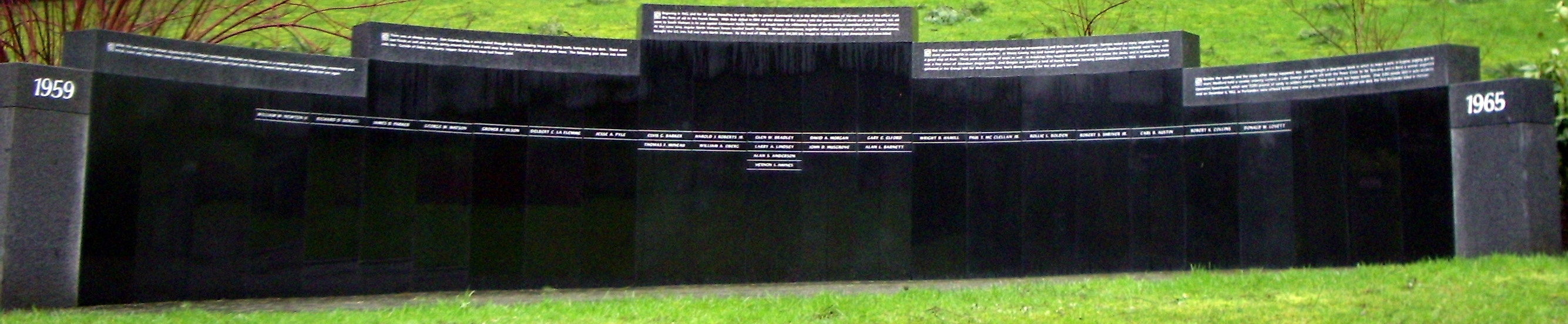
1959 through 1964

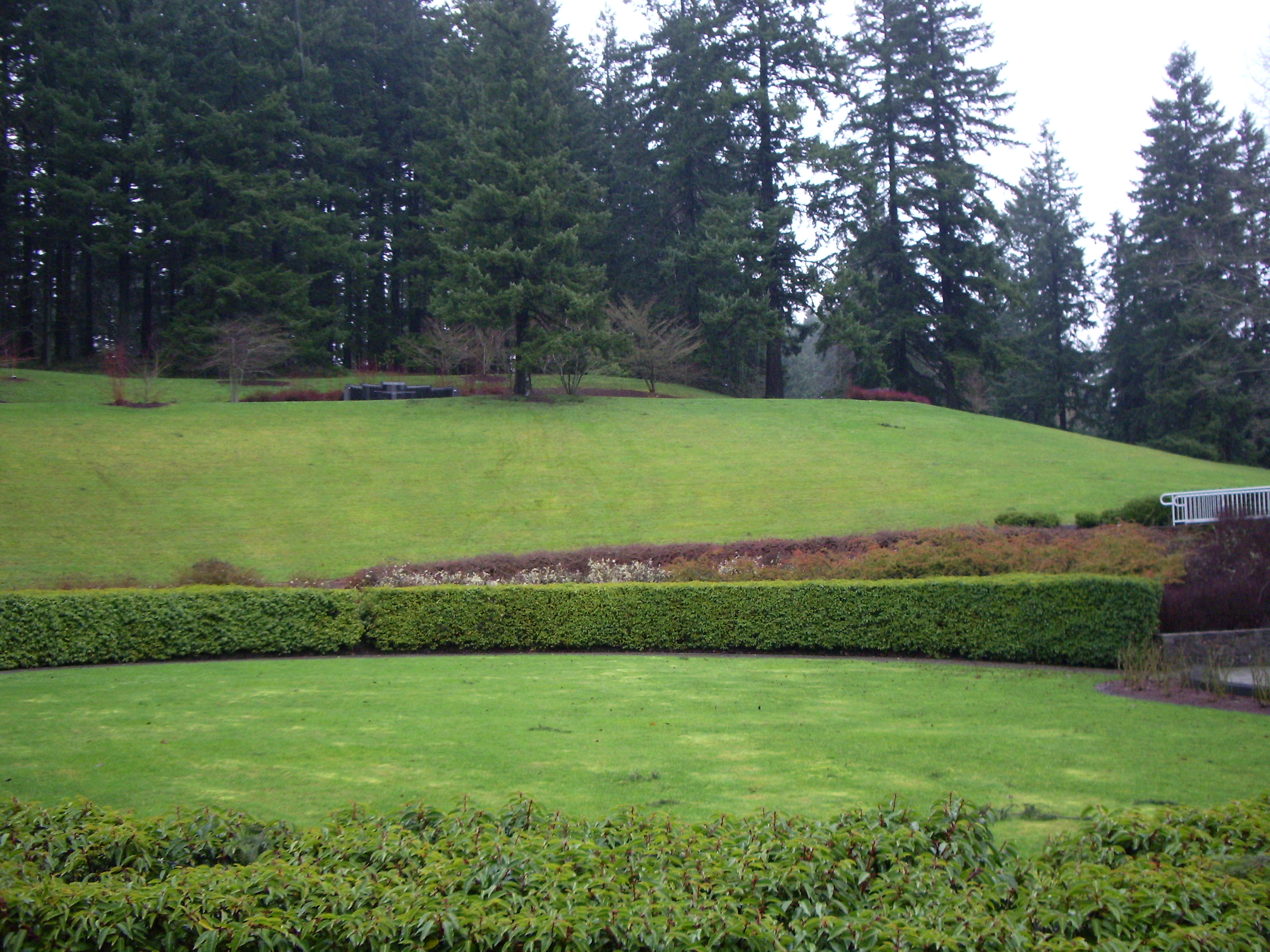
Amphitheater and last memorial

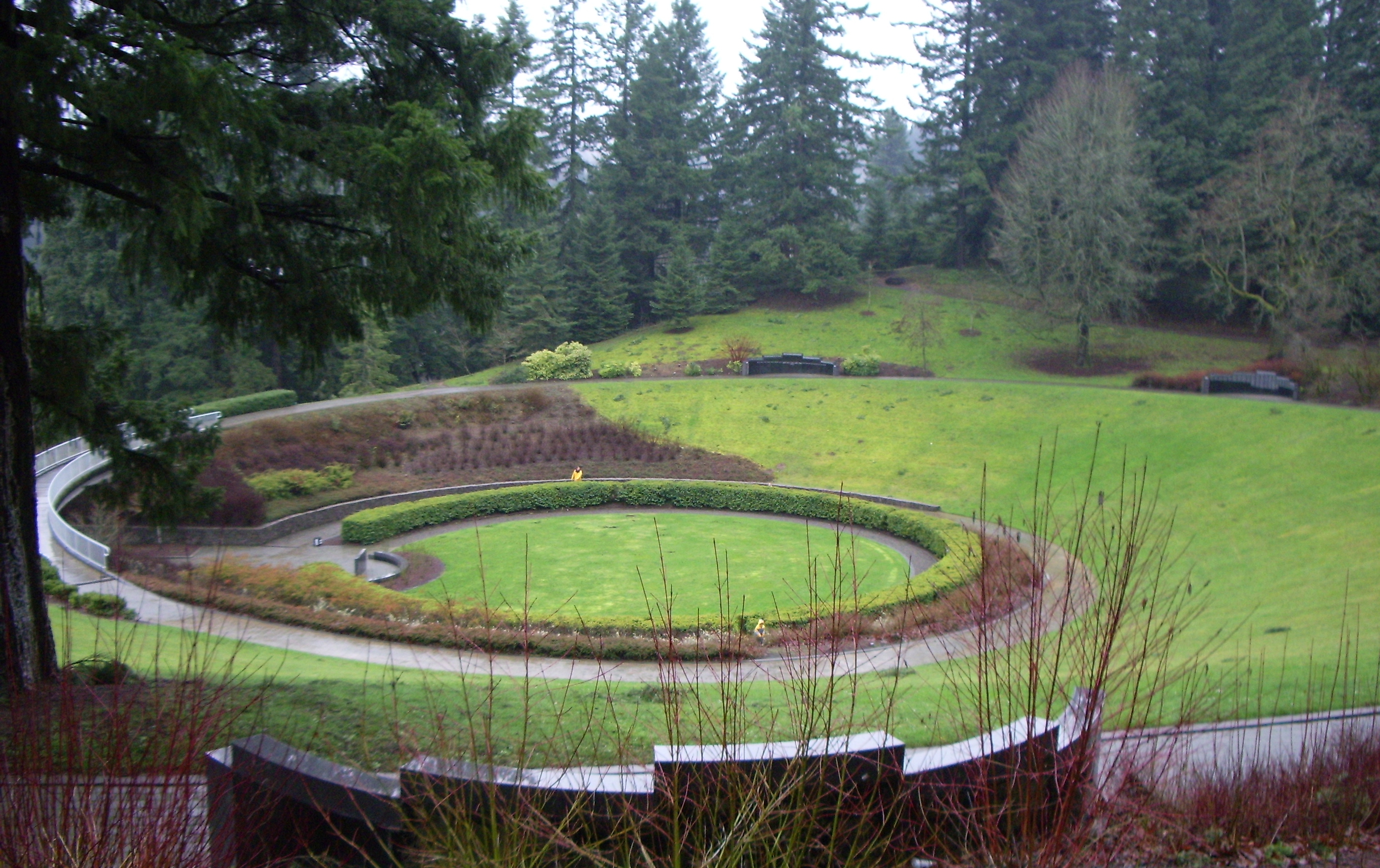
Overlook

== See also ==
- Rose Quarter Veterans Memorial
- Oregon Korean War Memorial
