= List of reservoirs in Portland, Oregon =

The city of Portland, Oregon, is known for having a large number of man-made reservoirs.

Portland's reservoirs provide storage for drinking water from the Bull Run River. Portland is currently in the process of covering some of these reservoirs for continued use due to health concerns, but plans to keep most of them uncovered for their historic and cultural significance to Portlanders. These reservoirs are common for photography and art and are generally located in areas with panoramic views due to the need for them to be elevated.

== List ==
=== Aboveground ===
Name	Image	Built	Location	Notes
Balch Creek Reservoir		1864	Forest Park	No longer used.
Lincoln Street Reservoir		Late 1860s	South Portland	No longer existent. Gatehouse is the only surviving structure and most of the land was replaced by modern development.
Reservoir #1		1894	Mt. Tabor Park	
Reservoir #2		1894	Near Mt. Tabor Park	No longer existent. Gatehouse is the only surviving structure and most of the land was replaced by a retirement home.
Reservoir #3		1894	Washington Park	Is currently in the process of being replaced by an underground reservoir and surface reflecting pool.
Reservoir #4		1894	Washington Park	Is currently in the process of being replaced by an underground reservoir and surface reflecting pool.
Reservoir #5		1911	Mt. Tabor Park	
Reservoir #6		1911	Mt. Tabor Park	

=== Underground ===
Name	Image	Built	Location	Notes
Reservoir #7		1912	Mt. Tabor Park	Portland's first underground reservoir.
Powell Butte Reservoir #1		1981	Powell Butte Nature Park	
Powell Butte Reservoir #2		2014	Powell Butte Nature Park	
Kelly Butte Reservoir		2015	Kelly Butte Natural Area	
Washington Park Reservoir		Est. 2025	Washington Park	Currently under construction. Will feature false aboveground reservoirs on the surface.
