= Garden of Remembrance (Seattle) =

Memorial in Seattle, Washington, USA

- The Boeing Company
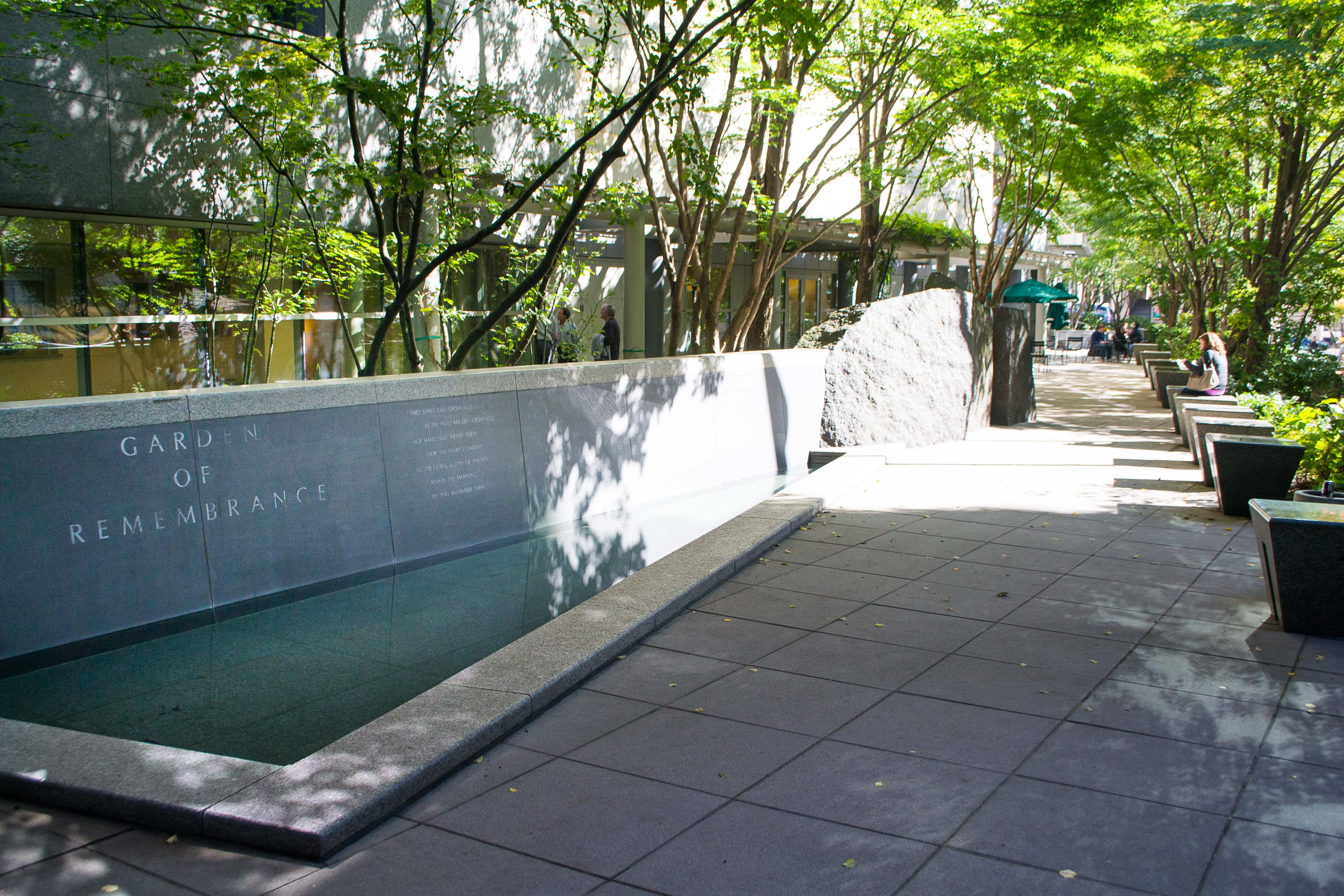
- The Garden of Remembrance in Seattle near Second and Union Streets
- For More than 8,000 Washington State war dead since World War II
- Unveiled: July 4, 1998
- Location: 47.608087°N 122.337571°W; Seattle, Washington
- Designed by: Robert Murase
- Ode of Remembrance

The Garden of Remembrance is a memorial in honor of over 8,000 Washington state residents who have died in wars since World War II. The memorial includes a passage from Laurence Binyon's poem, "For the Fallen". Designed by Robert Murase, the Garden is located on the Second Street side of Benaroya Hall.
