= Graham Oaks Nature Park =

Nature park in Oregon, United States

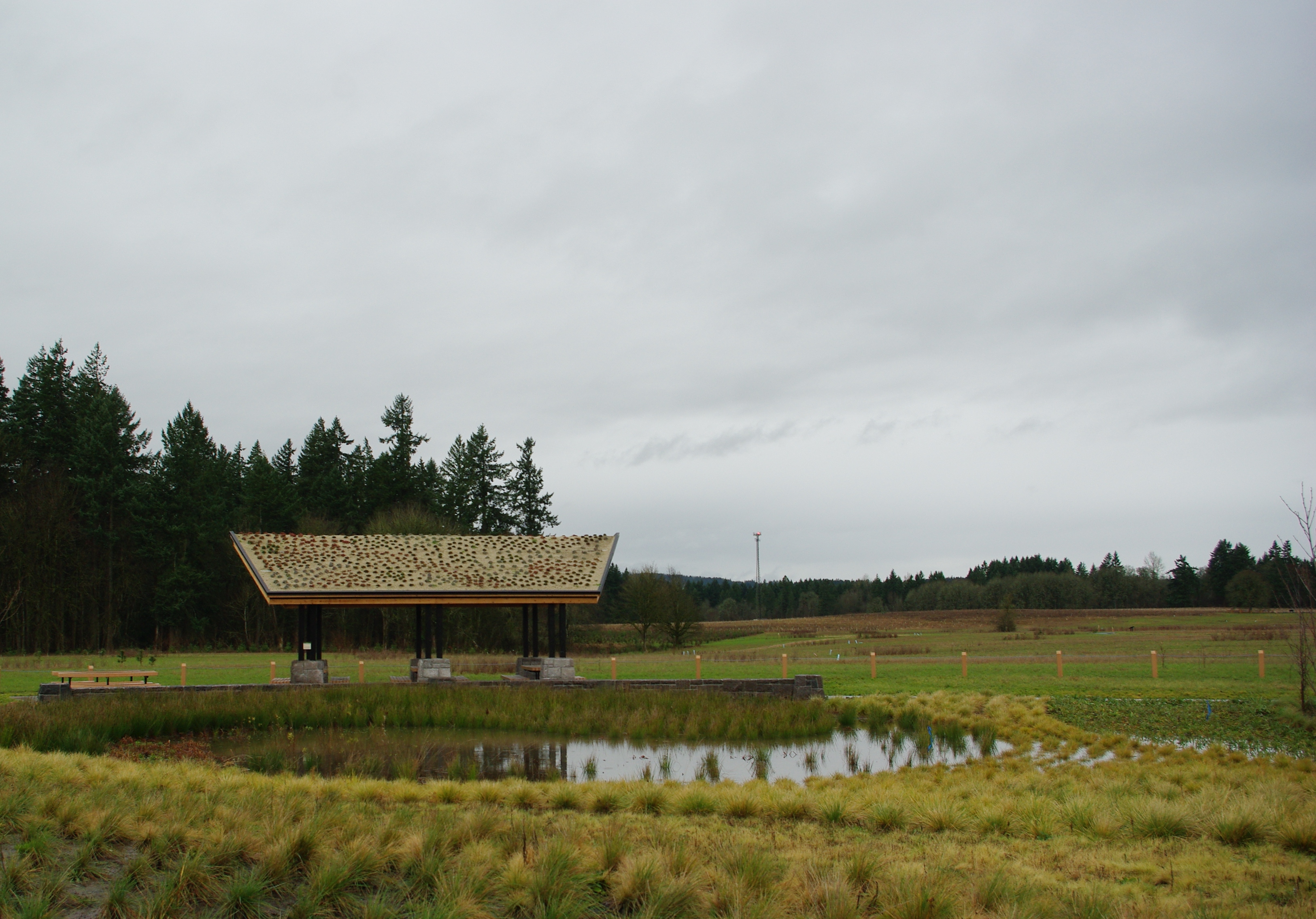
- Picnic shelter and pond at the park
- Interactive map of Graham Oaks Nature Park
- Type: Public
- Location: Wilsonville, Oregon; United States
- Coordinates: 45.3003°N 122.802°W
- Area: 250 acres (1,000,000 m^{2})
- Created: 2010
- Status: Open
- Website: Graham Oaks Nature Park

Graham Oaks Nature Park is a 250 acres (100 ha) nature park in Wilsonville in the U.S. state of Oregon. Opened in 2010, the park is owned and operated by Metro, the regional government in the Oregon portion of the Portland metropolitan area.

== History ==
Prior to designating the land as a nature park, Metro originally planned to build a landfill on the property in the 1980s. Metro then purchased the property in 2001 for $1.6 million from the state. At one time, the state also owned the adjacent land to the north where the Dammasch State Hospital stood, and the land to the west where the Callahan Center was located before becoming the Living Enrichment Center. After buying the land, Metro started planting 150,000 native shrubs and trees on the former farm. Metro also spread an estimated 100 million wildflower and grass seeds and built trails and other amenities prior to the park opening.

A preview tour of the park was held in October 2008 at Graham Oaks. In August 2009, the Oregon State Parks & Recreation Commission provided Metro with a $500,000 grant for construction of the park. The next month, JP Contractors won the bid to build the $1.4 million park. Other funding for construction included $300,000 from Wilsonville and about $600,000 from Metro. In November 2009, construction started on park amenities, which were designed by landscape architecture firm GreenWorks.

Graham Oaks officially opened to the public in September 2010. In January 2011, Wilsonville's South Metro Area Regional Transit added a stop at the park.

== Details ==
The Villebois development lies to the north, and to the east are Inza R. Wood Middle School and Boones Ferry Primary School. Wilsonville Road borders the park to the south, and Grahams Ferry Road on the west. The school district’s Center for Research in Environmental Sciences & Technologies (CREST) located next to the primary school also uses the park as an outdoor classroom. Graham Oaks has six different types of habitat over the 250-acre (100 ha) park. These habitats include oak savanna, wetlands, oak woodland, and a conifer forest, among others.

=== Amenities ===
Amenities at the park include five plazas along the 3 miles (4.8 km) of trails. Trails include a portion of the Tonquin Trail, a paved regional trail planned to connect to Tualatin and Sherwood to the north. Other trails include Coyote Way, Legacy Creek, Arrowhead, Greenway, and Oak Woodland Walk, which connect to the adjacent parks and the neighborhoods of Villebois and the Park at Merryfield.

Other features include a parking lot, restroom, picnic shelter, stone acorn sculpted by Mauricio Saldana. The picnic shelter features a green roof that includes plants, while the restroom includes solar panels on the roof. Additional environmentally friendly items at the park include bioswales, pervious pavement, and LED lighting. There are also overlooks and signs, with the signs provided by the Confederated Tribes of the Grand Ronde. That tribe includes the Kalapuyan tribes who once inhabited the area.
