= Brown's Ferry =

Brown's Ferry may refer to:

Places in the United States

(by state)

- Browns Ferry Nuclear Power Plant, on the Tennessee River in Alabama
- Brown's Ferry Park (Tualatin, Oregon), a park in Tualatin, Washington County, Oregon
- Brown's Ferry, South Carolina, a community in Georgetown County, South Carolina, site of a ferry crossing over the Black River
- Brown's Ferry Park (South Carolina), a park on Old Brown's Ferry Road, by the Black River in Georgetown County, South Carolina
- Brown's Ferry, Tennessee, a ferry crossing point over the Tennessee River near Chattanooga, Tennessee
- Brown's Ferry, Texas, a settlement and ferry crossing point
- Brown's Ferry (Drakes Corner, Virginia), a house on the National Register of Historic Places in Southampton County, Virginia

Events

- Battle of Brown's Ferry, an American Civil War battle also known as Brown's Ferry or Battle of Wauhatchie at the Tennessee ferry crossing point

== See also ==
- Brown's Ferry Park (disambiguation)
