= Brown's Ferry Park =

Brown's Ferry Park may refer to:

- Brown's Ferry Park (Tualatin, Oregon)
- Brown's Ferry Park (South Carolina), a park on Old Brown's Ferry Road in Georgetown County, South Carolina

== See also ==
- Brown's Ferry (disambiguation)
