= Horizon Christian School =

Horizon Christian School may refer to:

- Horizon Christian School (Hood River, Oregon)
- Horizon Christian School (Tualatin, Oregon)
