= West Coast Giant Pumpkin Regatta =

Annual event in Tualatin, Oregon, U.S.

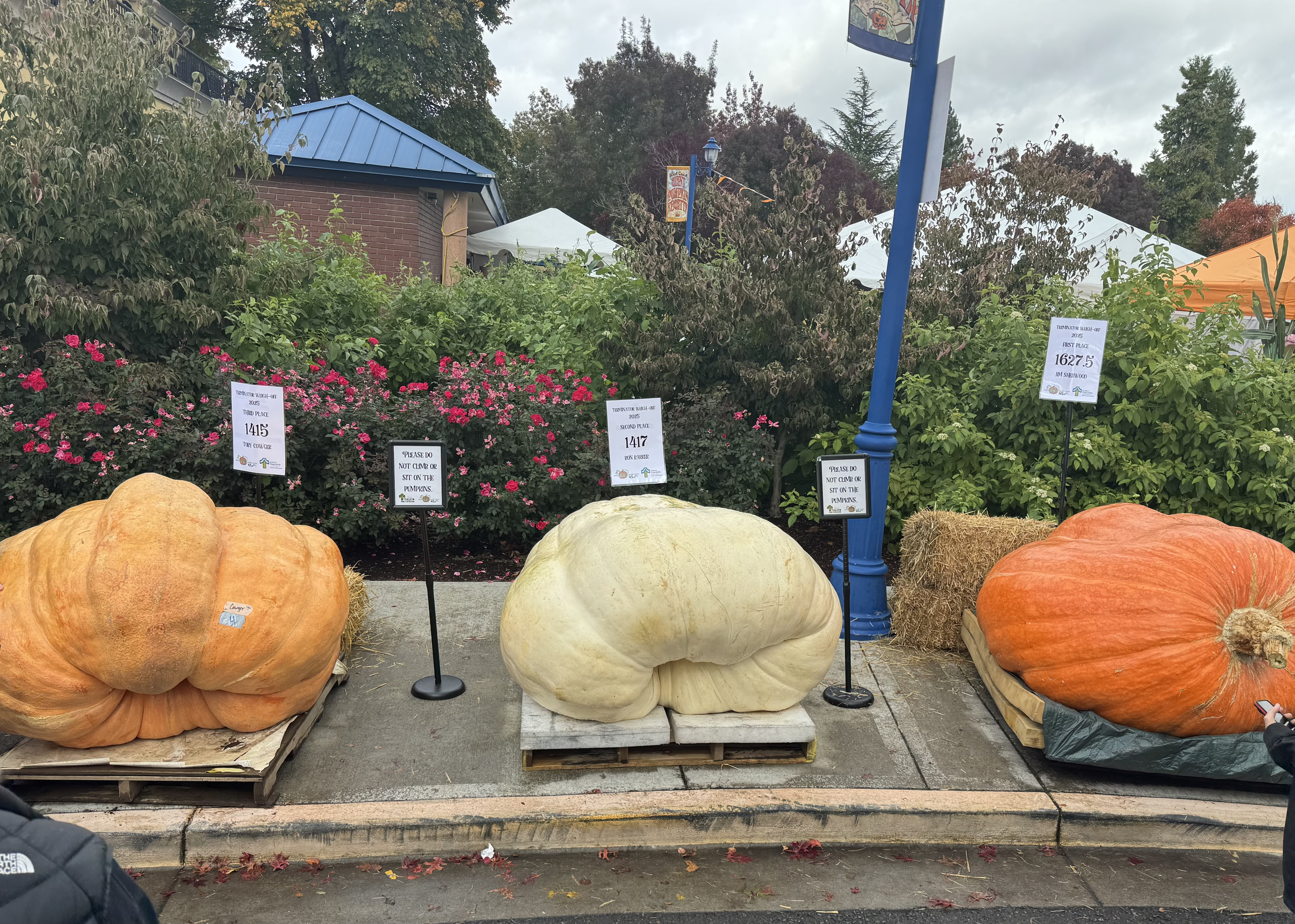
West Coast Giant Pumpkin Regatta, 2025

The West Coast Giant Pumpkin Regatta is an annual pumpkin regatta held annually in Tualatin, Oregon since 2004. The race is held on the Lake of the Commons, a man-made lake in Tualatin.

== History ==
The regatta was co-founded in 2004 by Jim Sherwood and Ron Wilson. Sherwood is a founder of the Pacific Giant Vegetable Growers which supplies the tournament with its pumpkins. Sherwood, who had been looking for secondary uses for pumpkins after entering them in weighing competitions, was inspired by the Windsor Pumpkin Regatta, which had been founded in 1999.

The inaugural tournament was held in Tualatin after Wilson, was denied permission to host the competition in a lake in Rainier, Oregon. The inaugural tournament featured a few competitors and a few dozen onlookers. By 2007, the tournament had grown and featured 2,000 spectators. Approximately 20,000 people from around the United States and Canada view the event today.

== Tournament structure ==
The tournament consists of multiple heats: one for pumpkin growers, one for the tournament's sponsors, one for local officials, and two for the members of the general public who enter via a lottery. Before the competition starts, pumpkins are lowered into the lake by forklifts before they are carved into boats. The race runs for approximately a quarter mile. Competitors are required to be over the age of 18 and wear family-friendly costumes.

Along with the regatta, the event features other pumpkin-themed competitions.

== See also ==
- Windsor Pumpkin Regatta
