= Wyatt Houston =

American football player (born 1994)

Profile
- Position: Tight end

Personal information
- Born: June 21, 1994 (age 32); Tualatin, Oregon, U.S.
- Listed height: 6 ft 5 in (1.96 m)
- Listed weight: 245 lb (111 kg)

Career information
- High school: Horizon Christian School
- College: Utah State
- NFL draft: 2017: undrafted

Career history
- Kansas City Chiefs (2017)*; Carolina Panthers (2017)*
- * Offseason or practice squad member only

Wyatt Houston (born June 21, 1994) is an American professional football tight end who is currently a free agent. He played college football for the Utah State Aggies. He signed with the Kansas City Chiefs as an undrafted free agent in 2017.

== College career ==
Houston played college football at Utah State where he was ranked second all-time in receptions by recording 86 of the receptions for 933 career yards receiving and 9 total touchdown receptions.

== Professional career ==
=== Kansas City Chiefs ===
Houston signed with the Kansas City Chiefs as an undrafted free agent on May 6, 2017, but was waived three days later.

=== Carolina Panthers ===
On May 31, 2017, Houston signed with the Carolina Panthers. He was waived on July 29, 2017.
