= Ride Connection =

Paratransit service in the Portland, Oregon metropolitan area, U.S.

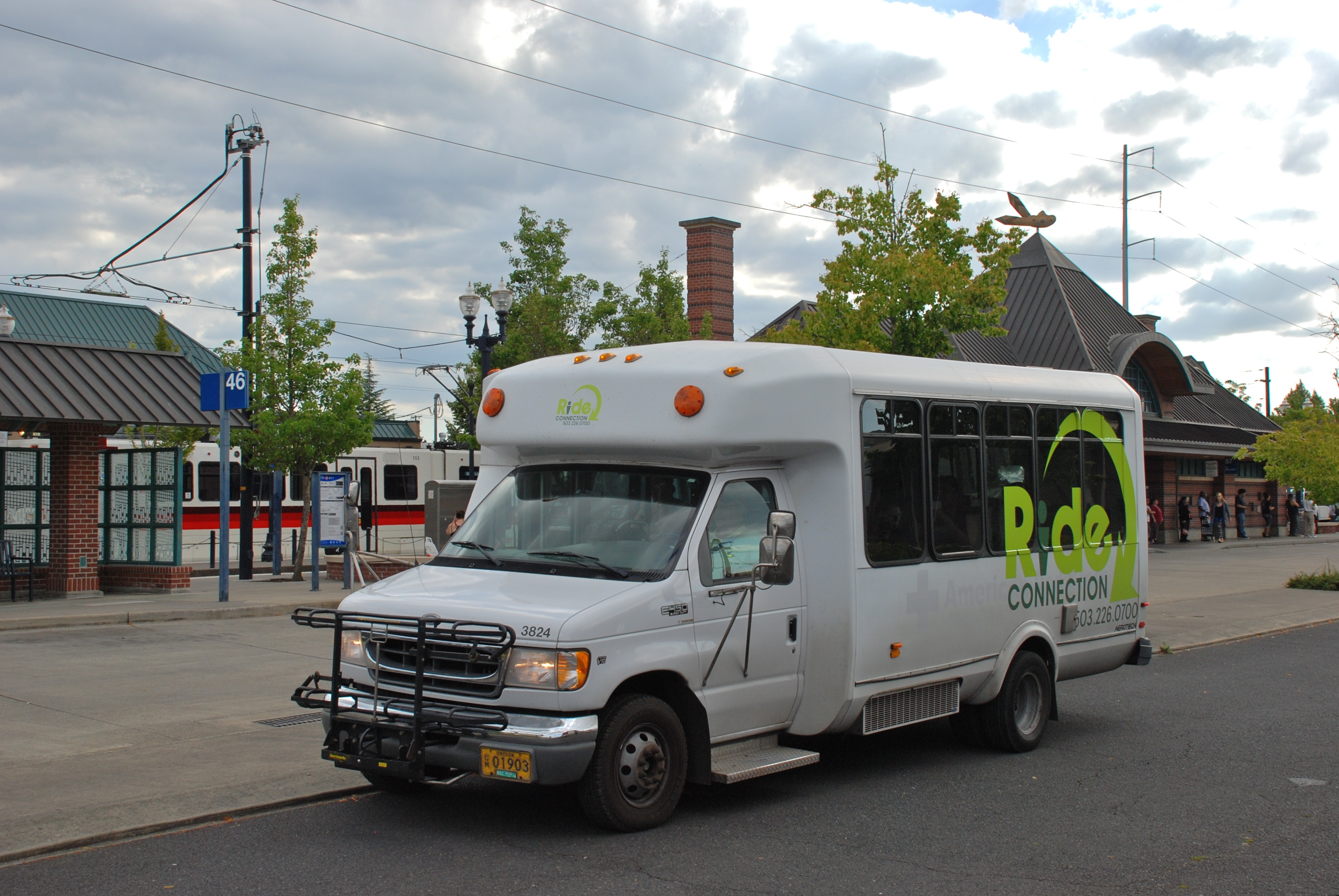
- A Ride Connection minibus at Hillsboro Central Transit Center in 2014

Overview
- Locale: Portland metropolitan area, Oregon, U.S.
- Transit type: Public transport bus service, paratransit
- Website: rideconnection.org

Operation
- Began operation: May 26, 1988

Ride Connection is a private, nonprofit organization that provides fixed bus route and paratransit services in the Portland metropolitan area in the U.S. state of Oregon. It was founded as Volunteer Transport, Inc. on May 26, 1988.

== History ==
On May 26, 1988, Volunteer Transport, Inc. (VTI) was established to provide accessible transportation for older adults and people with disabilities in the Portland metropolitan area. In 1990, it began partnering with TriMet to offer ADA-compliant paratransit services, enhancing accessibility for those unable to use fixed-route transit.

== Paratransit services ==
Ride Connection provides paratransit services to anyone over the age of 60 or with a disability, and people with low income. It complements TriMet's LIFT.

== Fixed-route networks ==
Ride Connection refers to its fixed bus route services as "Community Connectors". As of 2024, it operates eight Community Connectors in communities mostly within Washington County. Riders may schedule an off-route pick up (within 1/2 mile of the route) by calling in. Ride Connection also partners with the Tillamook County Transportation District by subsidizing a Wave bus route between Banks, North Plains, and Portland. All services are fare free.

=== GroveLink ===
GroveLink serves Forest Grove with two routes: West Loop and East Loop. A third, less-frequent route called the Employment Loop operates in the early mornings and early afternoons. GroveLink originated from a study that realized a need for a more local service than TriMet bus route 57–TV Highway/Forest Grove, which had operated as the only public transit service within Forest Grove with a single route along Pacific Avenue (Oregon Route 8) eastward to Hillsboro and Beaverton. GroveLink began operating on August 19, 2013.

=== North Hillsboro Link ===
The North Hillsboro Link began operating on November 16, 2015.

=== Tualatin Shuttle ===
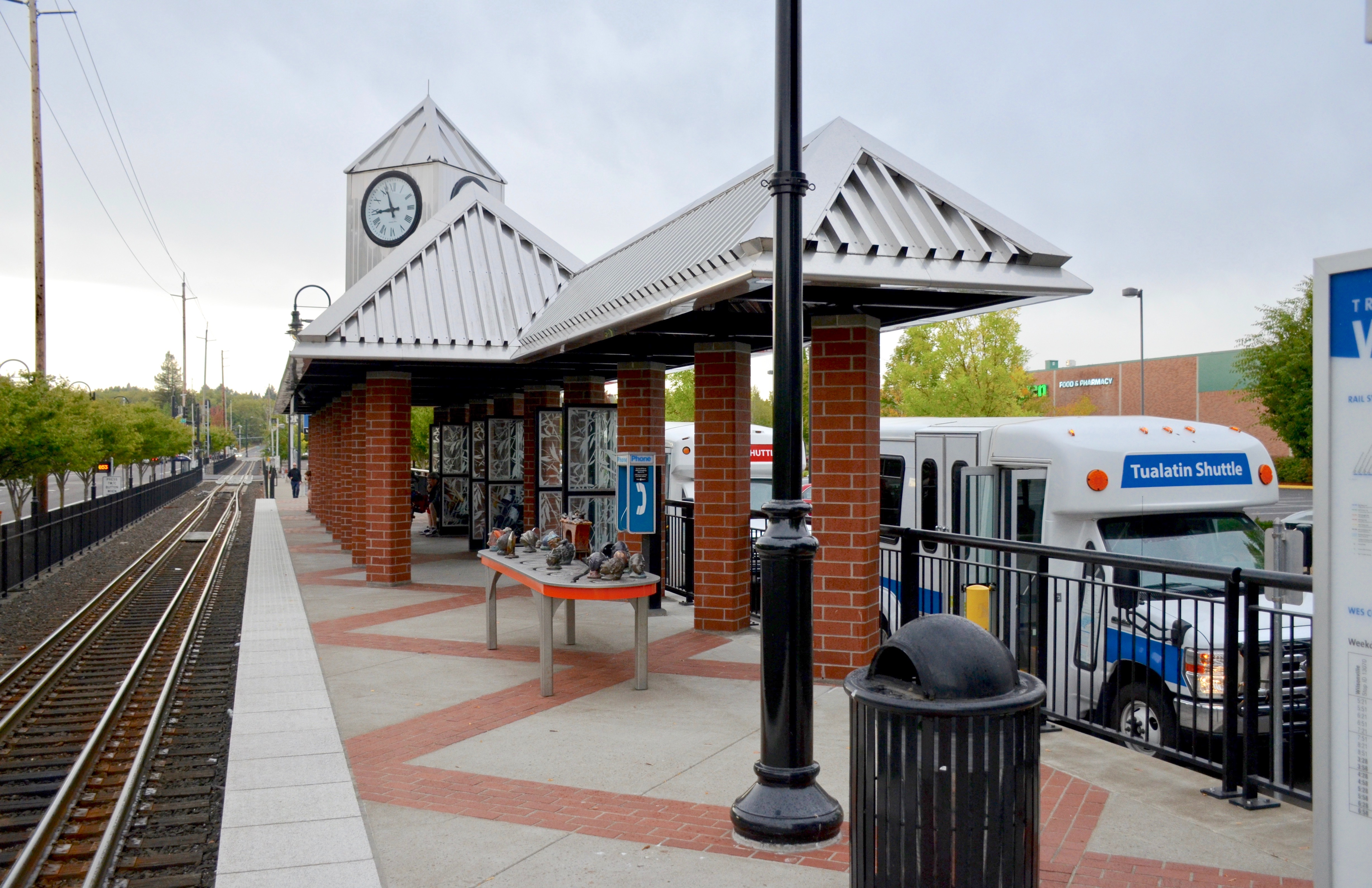
Tualatin Shuttle buses waiting at the Tualatin WES station

The Tualatin Shuttle serves Tualatin with three, color-designated routes, all of which connect at the Tualatin WES station, served by TriMet's WES Commuter Rail. The Tualatin Shuttle began as the "Tualatin Employment Shuttle", established by the Tualatin Chamber of Commerce in 1997. Ride Connection took over its operations on October 1, 2014. The Blue Line operates a loop route west of the WES station within neighborhoods surrounding Herman Road. The Red Line operates another loop route south and east of the WES station with stops at the Tualatin Library and Legacy Meridian Park Medical Center. In September 2021, Ride Connection introduced a third route that runs from Bridgeport Village, the WES station, Legacy Meridian Park Medical Center, and Borland Free Clinic. Service operates from Monday to Friday in coordination with WES train arrivals.

=== Bethany Link ===
Bethany Link began operating on October 14, 2024, connecting TriMet's Sunset Transit Center (and MAX Light Rail station) with the Bethany area and Portland Community College's Rock Creek campus via Cedar Mill. It operates Mondays to Fridays.
