= Pumpkin regatta =

Type of boat race

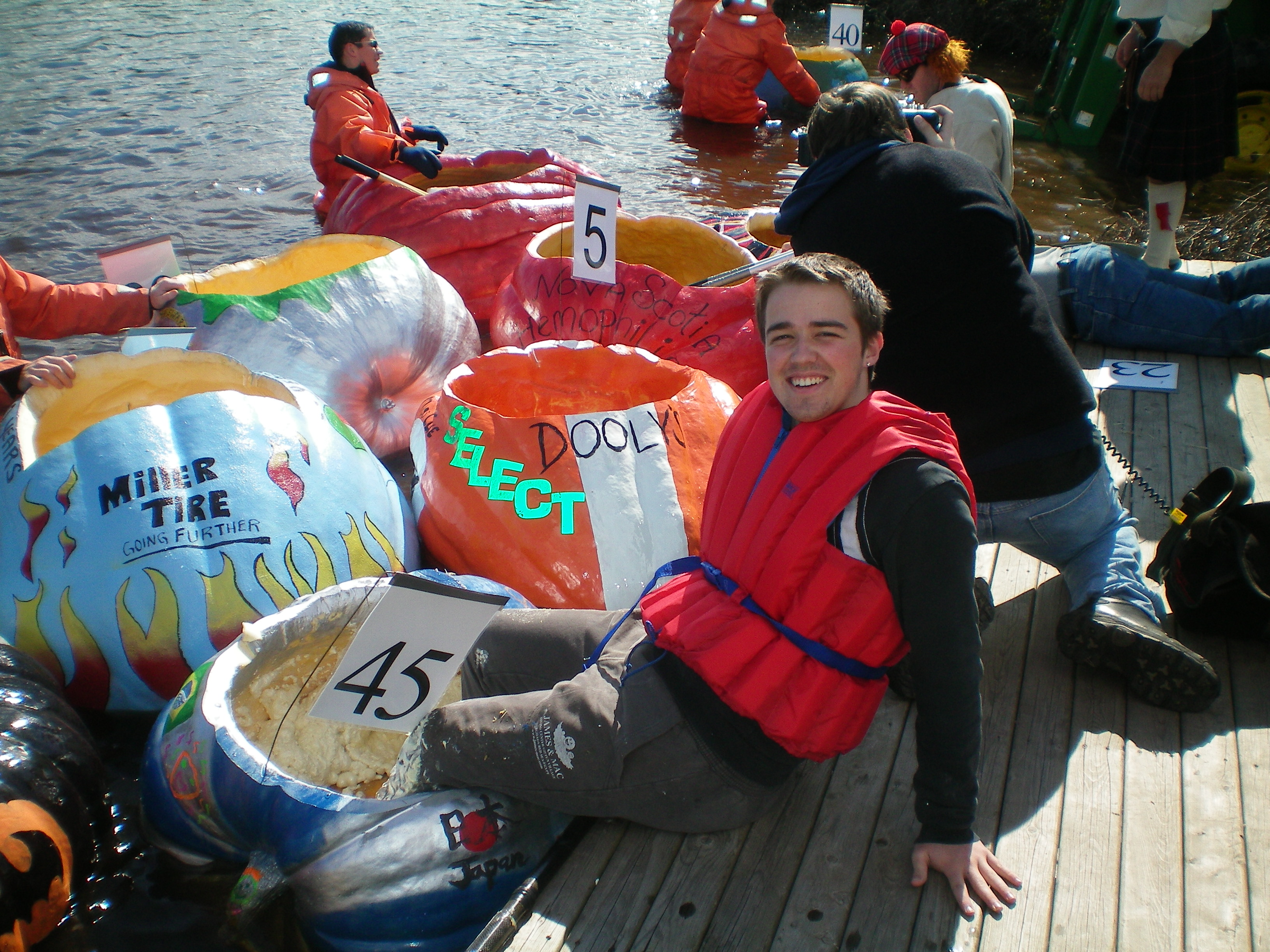
A competitor rests in a pumpkin during the 2008 Windsor Pumpkin Regatta

A pumpkin regatta is a water-based racing competition where competitors row in giant pumpkins, often over 1,000 pounds. The events often coincide with fall festivals and Halloween celebrations.

== History ==
The first pumpkin regatta was organized by Danny Dill and held in Windsor, Nova Scotia, in 1999. The launch of the Windsor Pumpkin Regatta then inspired the creation of pumpkin boat races across the United States. By 2001, a pumpkin regatta was hosted in Goffstown, New Hampshire. In 2004, Ron Wilson and Jim Sherwood launched the West Coast Giant Pumpkin Regatta, which has been held in Tualatin, Oregon annually. In 2005, pumpkin regattas were held in Maine, on the Damariscotta River, and on Lake Mendota, Wisconsin. The Wisconsin regatta is organized by horticulture faculty at the University of Wisconsin-Madison. The regattas now regularly feature thousands of spectators and are attended by people from across the United States and Canada. Pumpkin regattas have also been held in Burlington, Vermont; Taunton, Massachusetts; and in the United Kingdom and Germany.

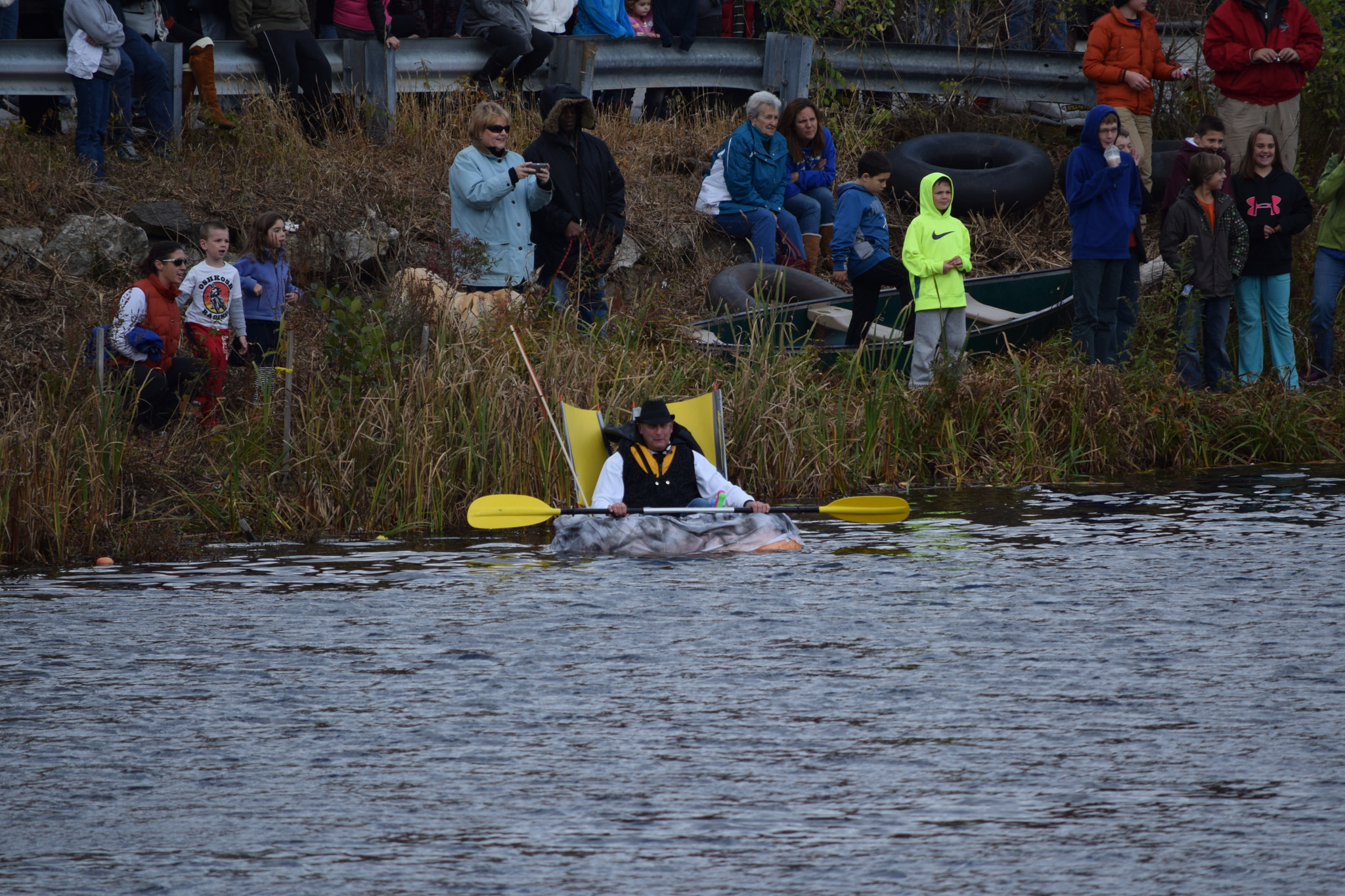
A racer at a pumpkin regatta in Goffstown, New Hampshire in 2014

== See also ==
- Windsor Pumpkin Regatta
- West Coast Giant Pumpkin Regatta
