= Tualatin station =

Train station in Tualatin, Oregon, US

Tualatin
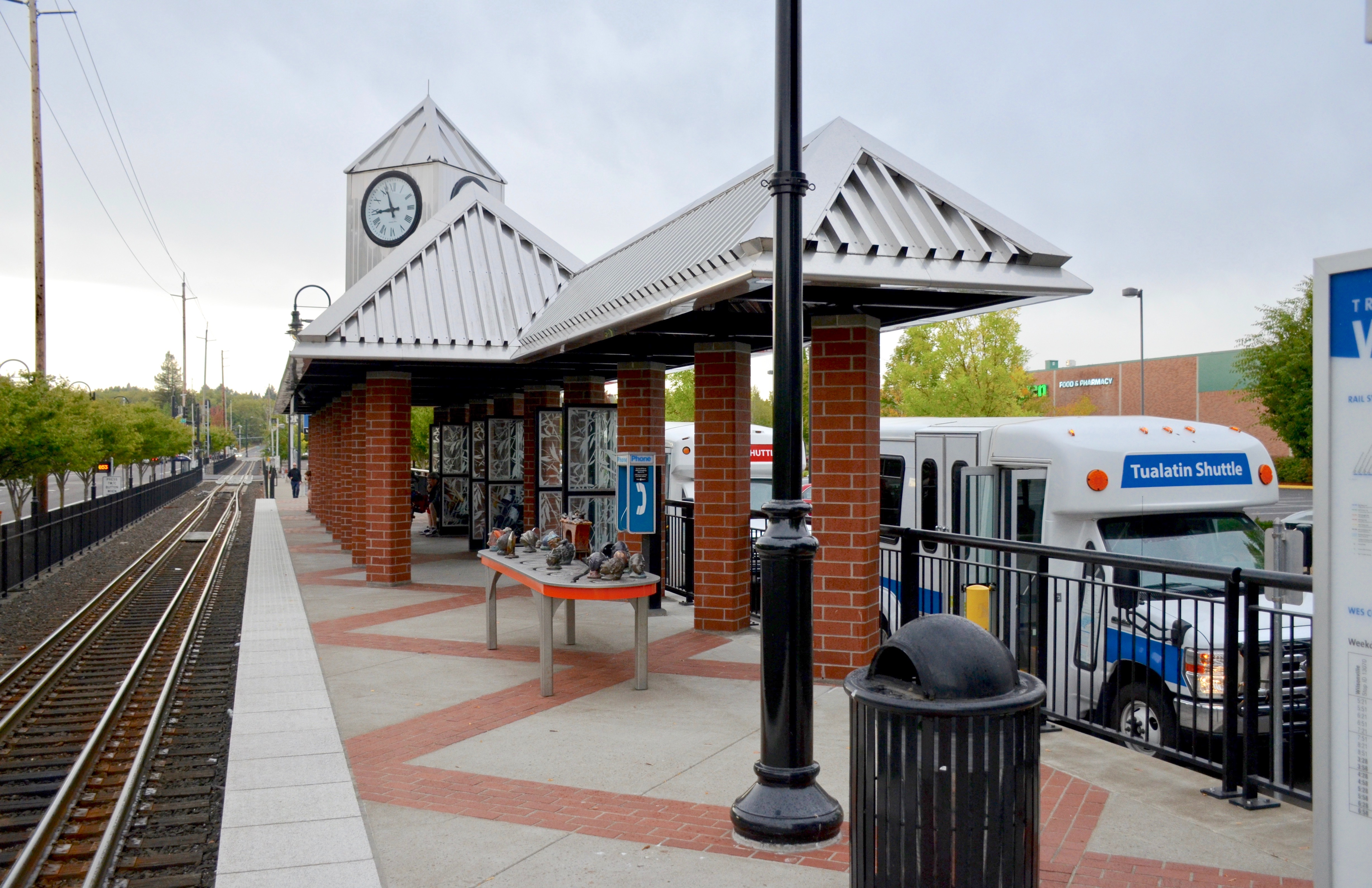
- Tualatin station in 2015

General information
- Location: 18955 SW Boones Ferry Road; Tualatin, Oregon, U.S.
- Coordinates: 45°23′00″N 122°45′52″W
- Owner: TriMet
- Line: Portland and Western Railroad
- Platforms: 1 side platform
- Tracks: 1
- Connections: TriMet bus, Tualatin Shuttle

Construction
- Structure type: At-grade
- Parking: 129 spaces
- Cycle facilities: Lockers and racks
- Accessible: yes

History
- Opened: February 2, 2009

Services
Preceding station	TriMet	Following station
Wilsonville Transit Center Terminus	WES Commuter Rail	Tigard Transit Center toward Beaverton Transit Center
Location

Tualatin station is a commuter rail station in Tualatin, Oregon, United States. Situated next to Hedges Green Shopping Center on Southwest Boones Ferry Road, it is the fourth southbound station on TriMet's WES Commuter Rail, which operates between Beaverton and Wilsonville in eastern Washington County. The station includes a 129-space park and ride and connections with the Tualatin Shuttle and TriMet bus routes 76–Hall/Greenburg and 97–Tualatin-Sherwood/Kruse Way. WES connects with MAX Light Rail, which servers the greater Portland metropolitan area, at Beaverton Transit Center.

Tualatin station was approved in 2004 as part of the Washington County Commuter Rail Project, but construction was delayed because of a dispute with its location and the amount of available parking. A compromise was eventually reached, and the station was completed in time for the start of WES service in 2009.

== History ==
In 1908, the Oregon Electric Railway (OE) established an interurban line between Portland and Salem, which at its peak extended as far south as Eugene. OE built a depot in Tualatin that is believed to have stood on the site of the present-day WES station. When automobiles began to dominate in the 1920s, ridership on the interurban failed to grow as projected, and OE ended passenger rail service in May 1933. Diesel freight trains continued to utilize the route into the 1990s.

Washington County officials started planning for a commuter rail line between Beaverton and Wilsonville in 1996. In 2001, local governments approved the Washington County Commuter Rail Project, which included plans for a station in Tualatin along Boones Ferry Road, in consideration of the city's transportation plan. The Federal Transit Administration authorized funding for the project in 2004, and construction began in October 2006.

After construction of the line had started, nearby grocery retailer Haggen Food & Pharmacy tried to have the station in Tualatin moved; Haggen argued that the station did not have enough parking and that it would worsen traffic around the area. Haggen's protest led to a delay in the station's construction, which had been scheduled to begin in July 2007. The city and Portland's regional transit agency, TriMet, countered that the location was selected in 2001 and was re-affirmed in 2005 with no objections from Haggen; TriMet further threatened to forgo building the station. In August, Haggen and TriMet compromised; the station's location remained as planned but with additional parking.

The station's construction commenced on January 9, 2008, with a groundbreaking ceremony attended by local dignitaries. The public artwork was installed that September. Tualatin station was completed in time for the opening of the line, by then named "Westside Express Service" (WES), on February 2, 2009.

== Station details ==
Tualatin station is situated on the east end of Hedges Green Shopping Center near the intersection of Southwest Boones Ferry Road and Seneca Street in downtown Tualatin. It is one of five WES stops along the 14.7-mile (23.7 km) rail segment owned by Portland and Western Railroad. The station has 129 park-and-ride spaces, 24 covered bike racks, and six bike lockers. The side platform measures 146 feet (45 m) in length and 15 feet (4.6 m) in width, covers about 2,000 square feet (190 m^{2}), and sits four feet (1.2 m) above the ground. It features card-only ticket vending machines and a digital information display that shows WES and bus arrival information. The platform shelter exhibits enhancements to TriMet's standard design practices; it includes a clock tower and red brick columns intended to blend in with the neighborhood's existing architectural styles. The Tualatin Development Commission contributed $491,000 for the enhancements.

Tualatin station's public art consists of an interactive sculpture created by Frank Boyden and Brad Rude entitled The Interactivator. It features bronze heads and a vehicle designed to represent the train and the variety of people who ride the line. The vehicle moves along a track and has an animal figure displayed in a scene atop the piece. The shelter's glass windbreak is etched with a willow pattern.

=== Services ===
Tualatin is the fourth of five stations southbound on WES, between Tigard Transit Center and the line's southern terminus, Wilsonville station. WES provides a connection to the Blue and Red lines of MAX Light Rail at its northern terminus, Beaverton Transit Center. Service operates only on weekdays during the morning and evening commutes and trains arrive at the station every thirty minutes per direction. A bus stop near Tualatin station connects to TriMet bus routes 76–Hall/Greenburg and 97–Tualatin–Sherwood Rd. Additionally, a fixed-route bus service operated by Ride Connection called the Tualatin Shuttle connects riders between Tualatin station and local employers. As of 2019, the Tualatin Shuttle operates two routes within Tualatin; it coordinates with WES train arrivals and is free to use.

Images of Tualatin station
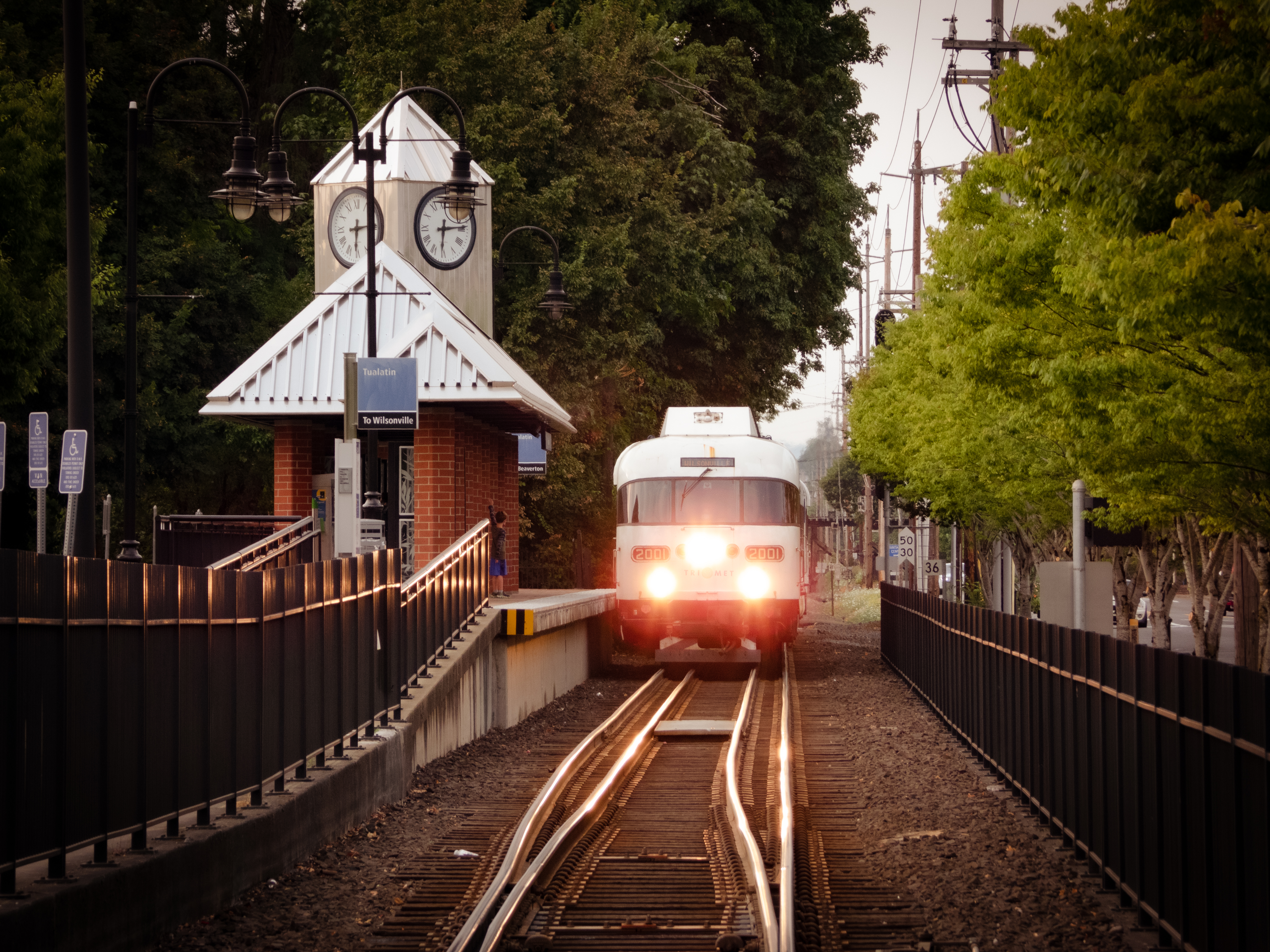
A southbound WES train pulling into the station

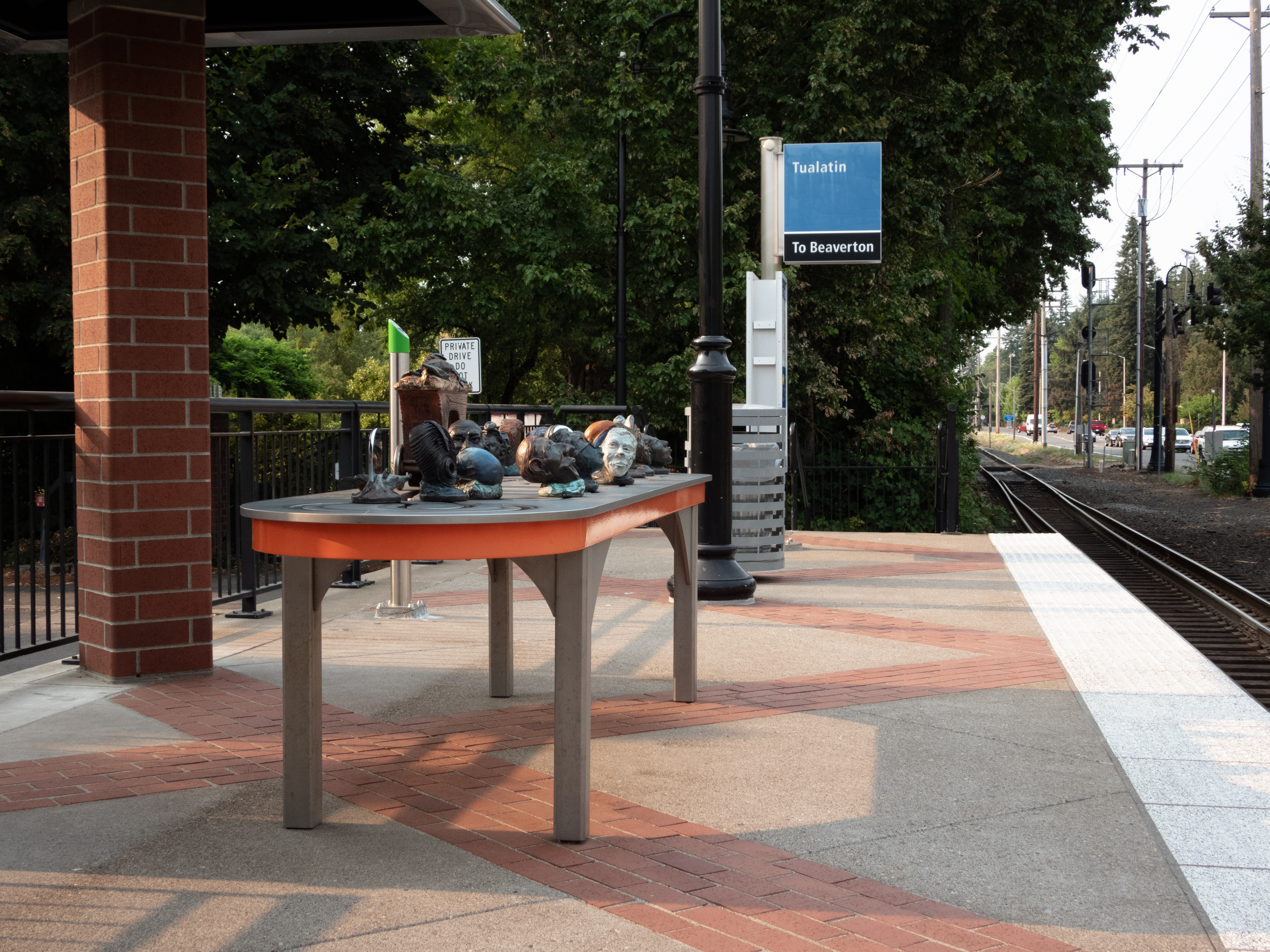
The Tualatin Interactivator
