= Bridgeport Village =

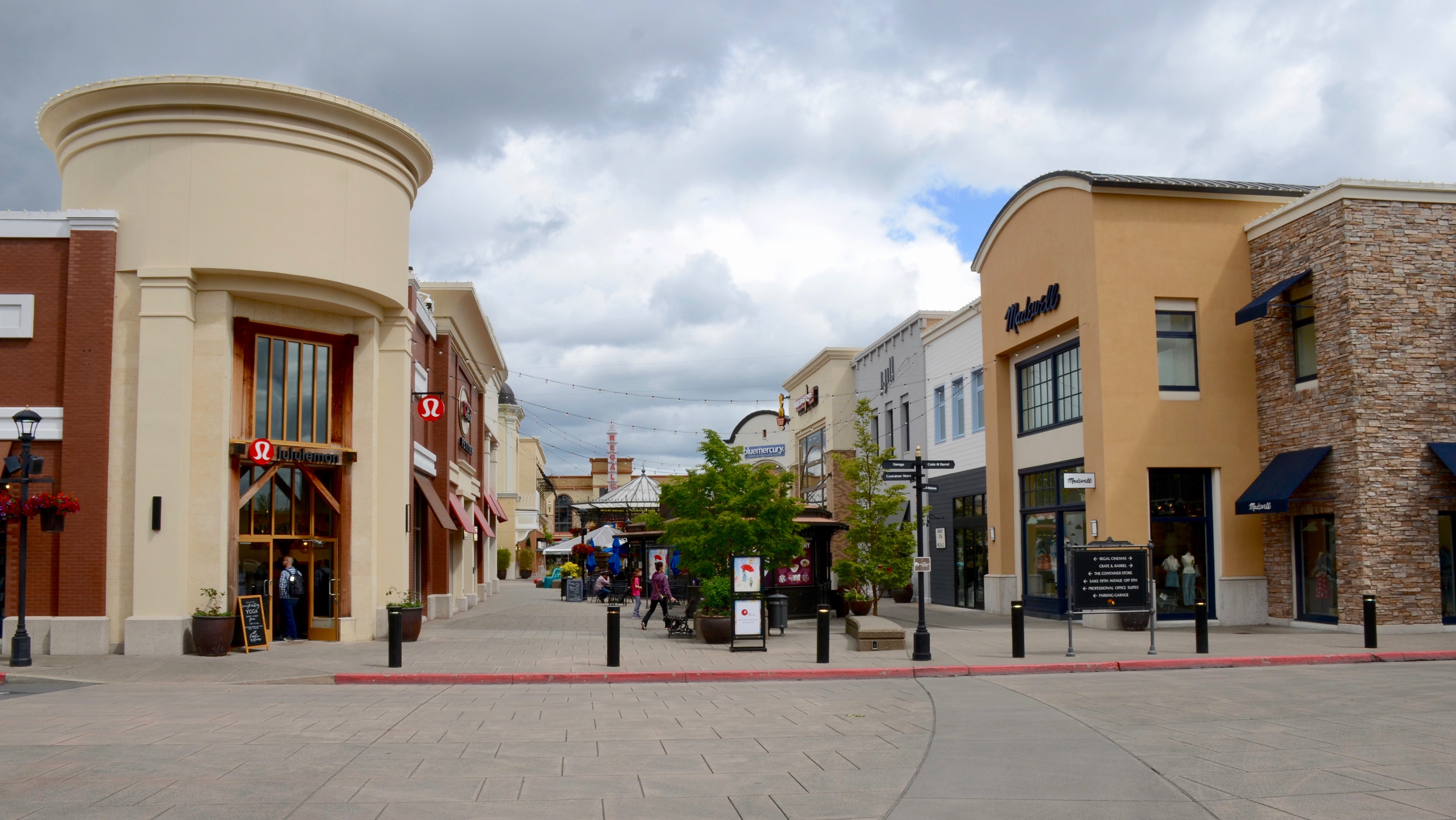
- Central walkway in 2019
- Location: Tigard and Tualatin, Oregon, United States
- Coordinates: 45.3960°N 122.7520°W
- Opened: May 19, 2005
- Owner: CenterCal Properties, LLC
- Num. of stores: 75
- Floor area: 465,000 square feet (43,200 m^{2}) (GLA)
- Website: bridgeport-village.com

Bridgeport Village is a shopping mall located in Tualatin and Tigard, Oregon, United States, operated by CenterCal Properties. It opened on May 19, 2005, and is located in one of the Portland metropolitan area's most affluent areas. Bridgeport Village is a lifestyle center with a variety of services, including valet service, restaurant reservations, a courtesy shuttle to vehicles, and umbrellas available to borrow for free. Upon opening, the center features a water and fire fountain, and an Italian gazebo and kiosks by Neri. The center went through a refresh project in 2022 which saw the removal of the fountain, Italian gazebo, and kiosks which were replaced by a "village green," covered canopies, and a wood kids play area.

== History ==
The site of the mall was originally a county-owned rock quarry. Washington County stopped removing gravel from the site in the 1980s and began filling the property in order to prepare the land for development. Plans for shopping center in the Bridgeport area where Lake Oswego, Tualatin, Durham, and Tigard meet began in 1999. In 2001, Washington County sold the former Durham gravel pit to Opus Northwest and Center Oak Properties for $18.75 million. The 30-acre (120,000 m^{2}) site was just west of Interstate 5 in both Tualatin and Tigard, and adjacent to Durham.

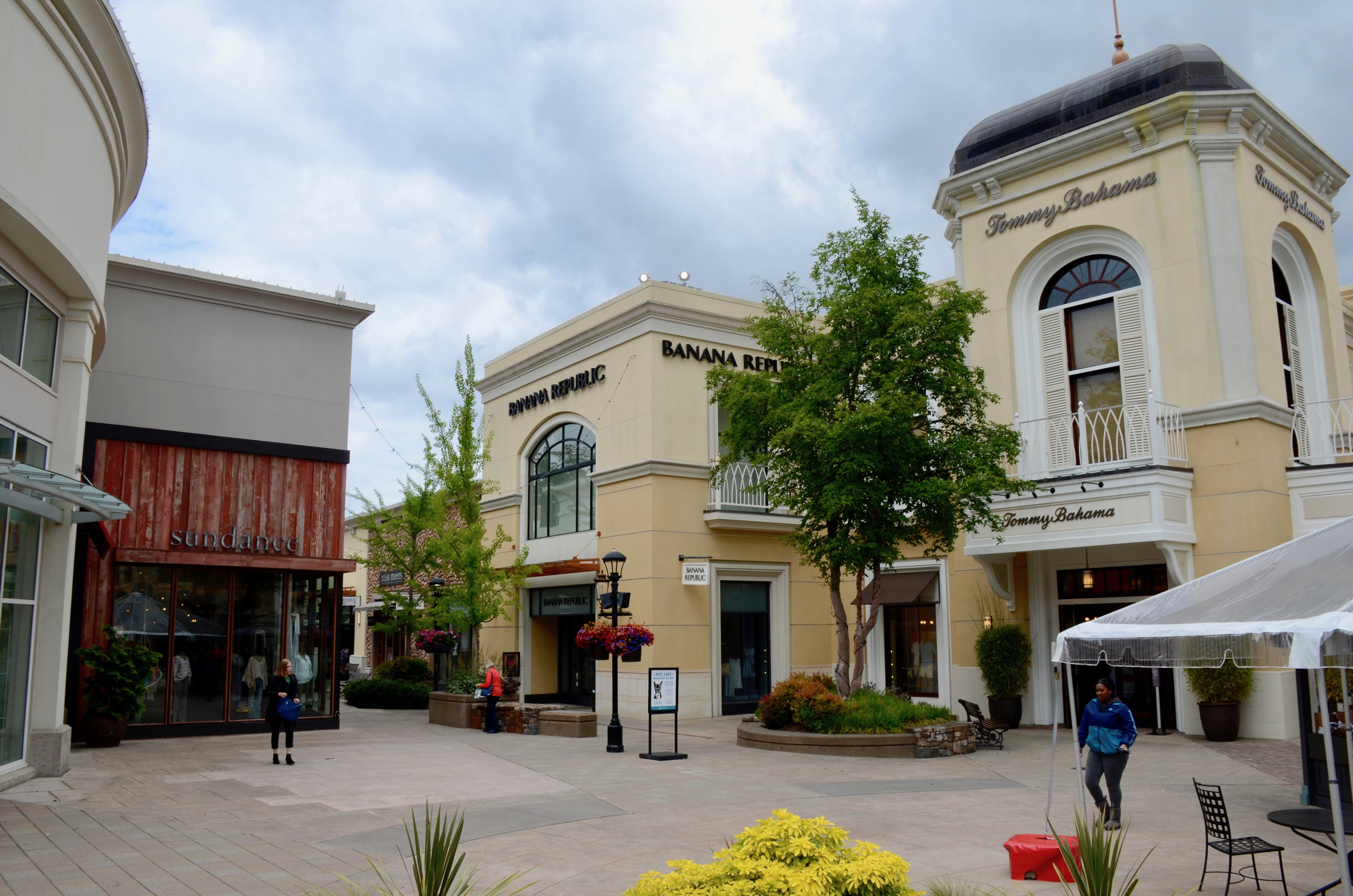
Small plaza where two pedestrian walkways intersect within the mall

Original plans called for a $163 million (USD) mixed use development with approximately 320,000 square feet (30,000 m^{2}) of retail space and 500,000 square feet (46,000 m^{2}) of office space. These plans also included residential space and a movie theater. Perkowitz + Ruth Architects helped design the village, which was designed without the traditional anchor department store. In 2003, Lake Oswego threatened to derail the project over concerns of congestion affecting the neighboring city. The city and Washington County settled the matter in August 2003, with Lake Oswego receiving $300,000 to use for traffic improvement projects.

Before the center opened, the development was sold for around $170 million to BV CenterCal LLC. Opus Northwest was the general contractor of the $80 million project. Overall costs for the entire development totaled $250 million. In November 2004, the first store at the open-air lifestyle center, Crate & Barrel, opened. On May 19, 2005, the rest of the mall opened, with additional stores at the site opened in November 2005. Planned residential units were never built, nor was a planned underground parking structure.

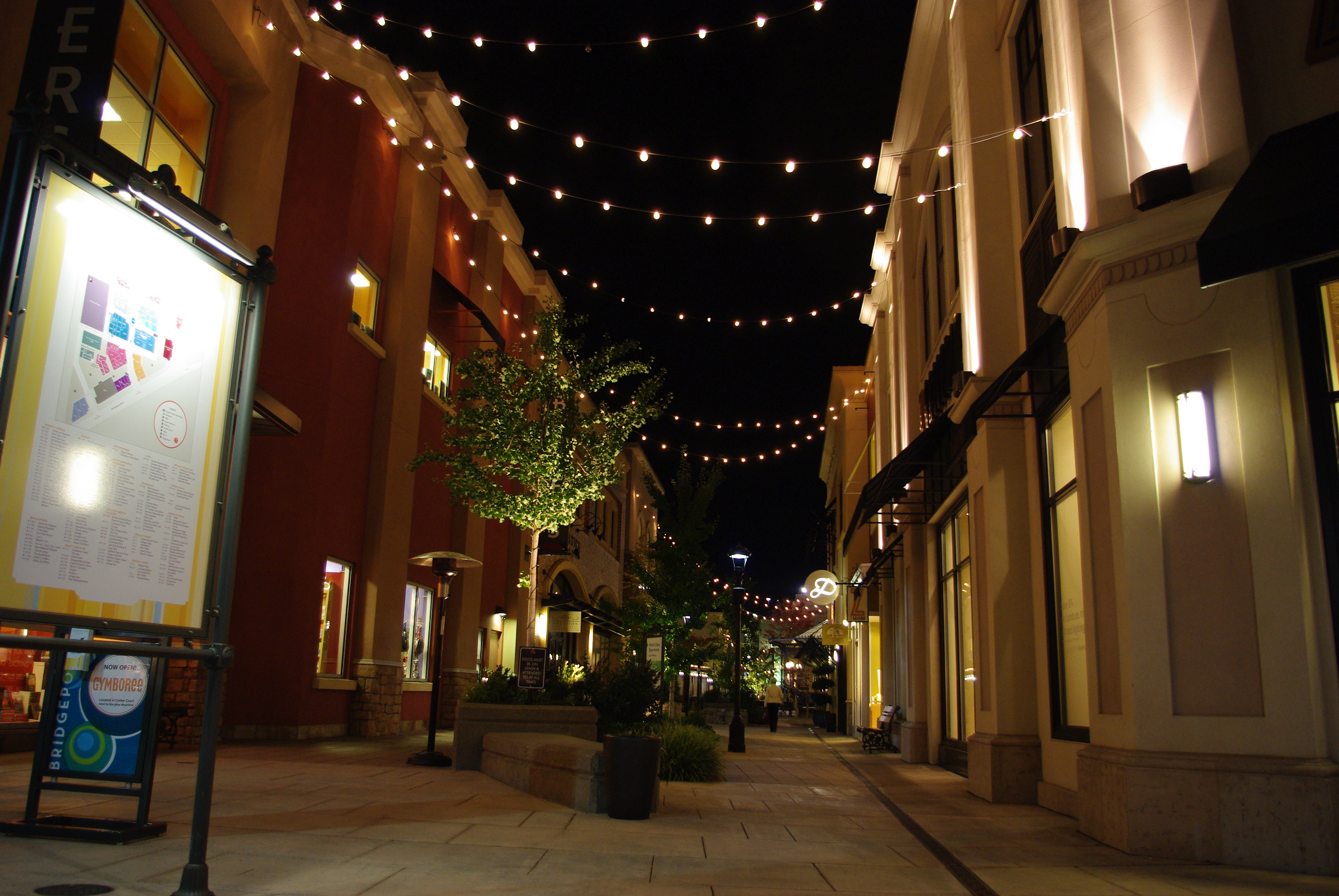
Line of shops at night

In 2006, the architect won an International Council of Shopping Centers Design and Development Award. By 2007, the center had revenue of more than $600 per square-foot, which placed Bridgeport Village in the top five-percent of malls in the United States. At that time it was also bringing in nearly 4 million shoppers each year, leading to discussions of whether to designate the area as a town center under the regional government's land use plan. In April 2008, the county settled legal claims against a contractor who filled the old rock quarry and prepared the site for the mall regarding methane gas leaking at the site for $1 million.

== Amenities ==
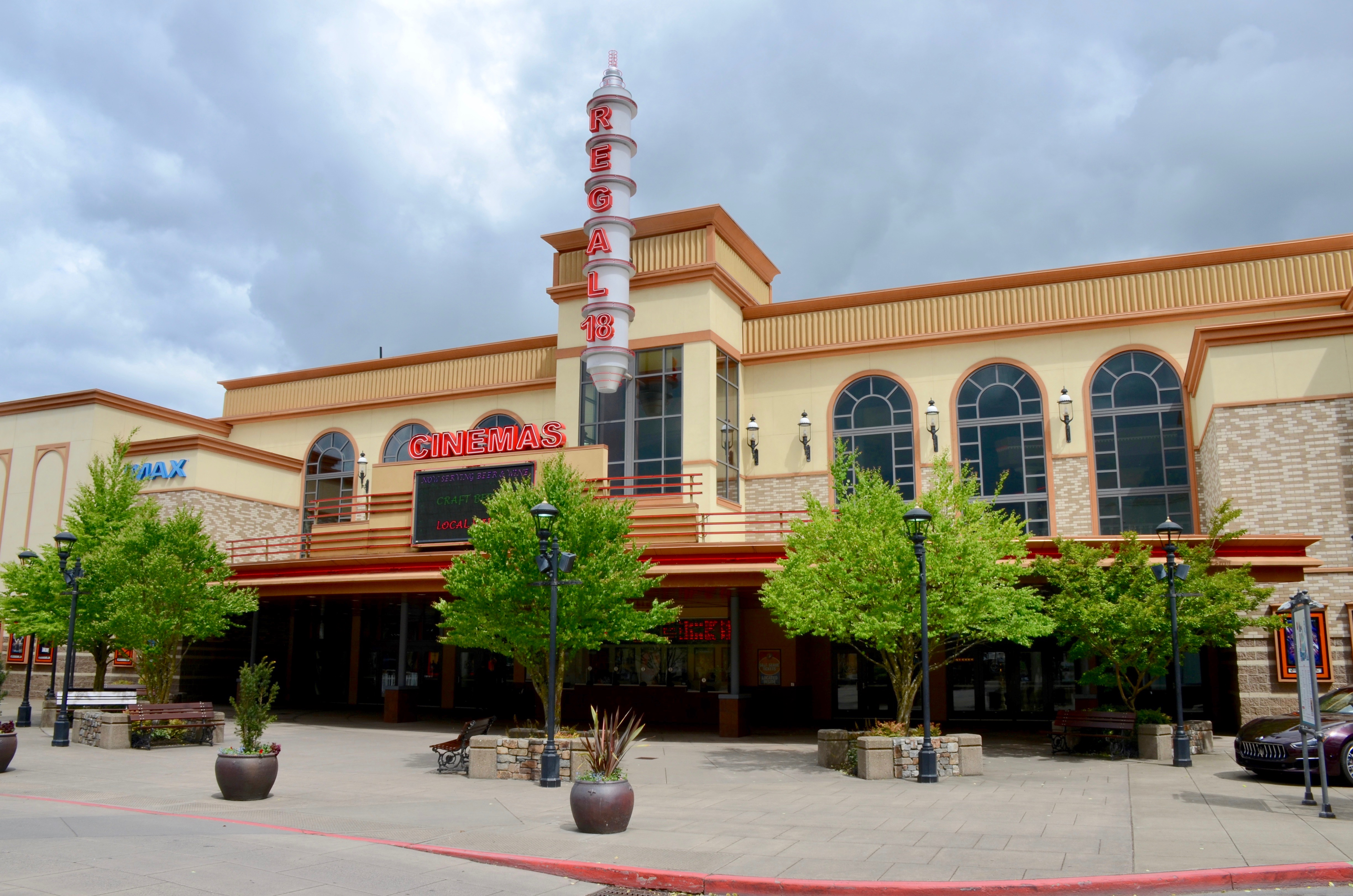
The Regal Cinemas movie theater

Bridgeport Village is an open-air lifestyle center focused around outdoor pedestrian areas, which are paved with bricks and concrete. Bridgeport Village has about 75 shops and restaurants, which include The Container Store, Crate & Barrel, California Pizza Kitchen, and P.F. Chang's China Bistro, among others. Other retail and restaurant developments surround Bridgeport Village, but are not part of the lifestyle center.

The complex includes 465,000 square feet (43,200 m^{2}) of leasable space, including an 18-screen theater owned by Regal Cinemas. The theater includes a 3D IMAX screen. Bridgeport includes 45,000 square feet (4,200 m^{2}) of office space on the second floor of the complex, and a four-story above-ground parking structure. Much of the office space is leased by professionals such as dentists. Other features include classic looking street lamps, music played throughout the complex, a gazebo, a fountain, and a children's play structure area.

== Future plans ==
Listed in the TriMet 2018 RTP is a plan to expand MAX service to the Southwest Corridor, which would extend MAX service from Portland State University to Bridgeport Village. TriMet expects this (and other projects) to be funded by 2027 with an opening soon after.

== See also ==
- List of shopping malls in Oregon
