= Tualatin, Oregon =

- City
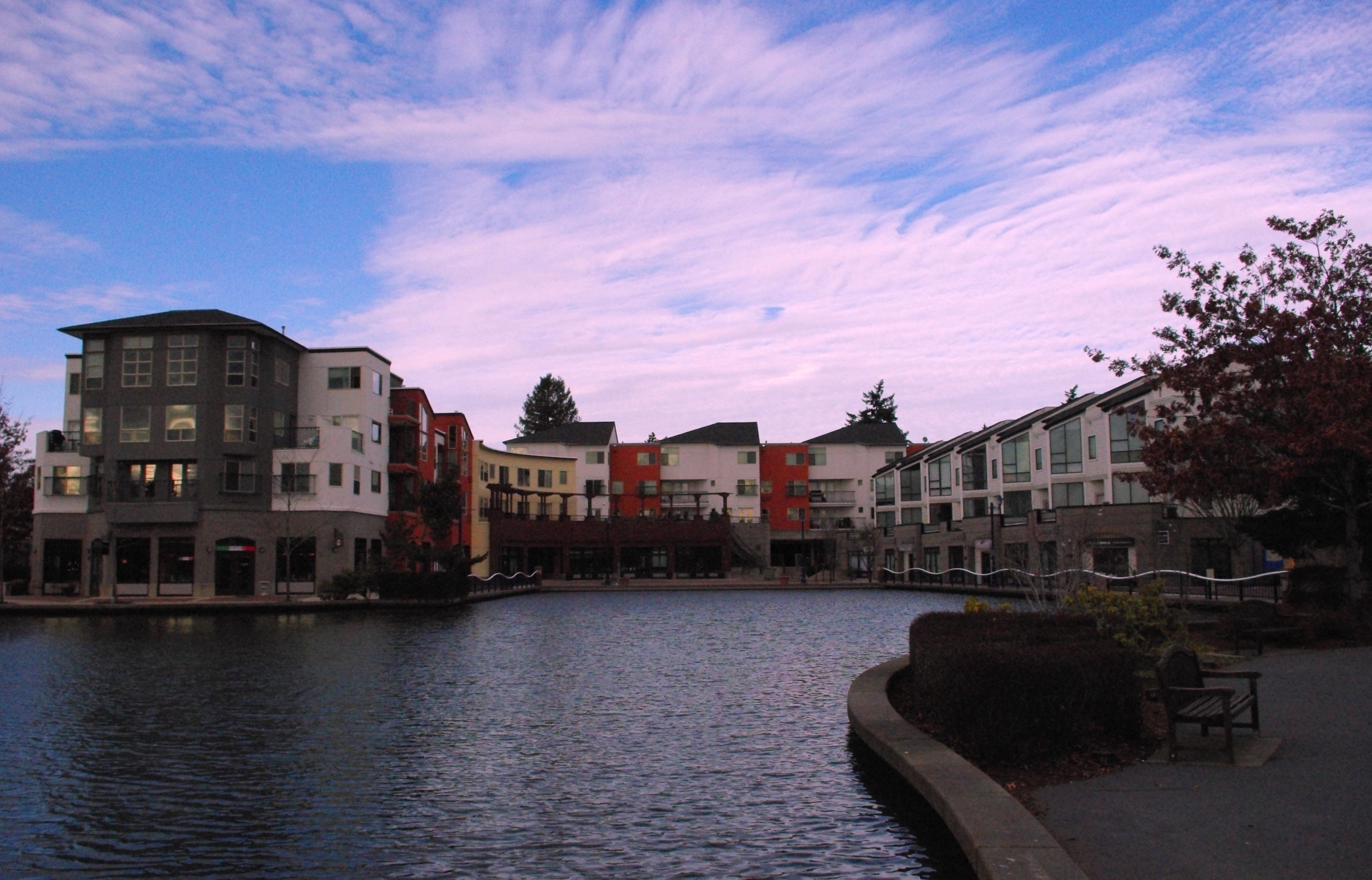
- Tualatin Commons

- Seal
- Anthem: "Tualatin Overture" by Arthur Breur
- Location in Oregon
- Coordinates: 45°22′53″N 122°45′52″W
- Country: United States
- State: Oregon
- Counties: Washington, Clackamas
- Incorporated: 1913

Government
  - Mayor: Frank Bubenik

Area
  - Total: 8.40 sq mi (21.75 km^{2})
  - Land: 8.40 sq mi (21.75 km^{2})
  - Water: 0 sq mi (0.00 km^{2})
- Elevation: 177 ft (54 m)

Population (2020)
  - Total: 27,942
  - Estimate (2022): 27,797
  - Density: 3,327.3/sq mi (1,284.69/km^{2})
- Time zone: UTC–8 (Pacific (PST))
  - Summer (DST): UTC–7 (PDT)
- ZIP code: 97062
- Area codes: 503/971
- FIPS code: 41-74950
- Website: www.tualatinoregon.gov

Tualatin (/tuˈɔːlətɪn/ too-AW-lə-tin) is a city located primarily in Washington County in the U.S. state of Oregon. A small portion of the city is also located in neighboring Clackamas County. It is a southwestern suburb in the Portland Metropolitan Area that is located south of Tigard. The population was 27,942 at the 2020 census.

== History ==
The name of the city is taken from the Tualatin River, which flows along most of the city's northern boundary. It comes from a Tualatin-Yamhill word that probably means "lazy" or "sluggish," but may also mean "treeless plain," for the plain near the river, or "forked," for its many tributaries. According to Oregon Geographic Names, a post office with the spelling "Tualitin" was established November 5, 1869, and the spelling changed to "Tualatin" in 1915.

In the 1850s, the settlement was first called Galbreath after its founder Samuel Galbreath. In 1853, Galbreath built the first bridge over the Tualatin river, and the town became known as Bridgeport. In the 1880s, John Sweek platted a town around the new railroad depot, and named the town Tualatin. It was incorporated as the City of Tualatin in 1913.

In 1962, a fossilized mastodon (Mammut americanum) was excavated in what later became a Fred Meyer parking lot. It is on display in the lobby of Tualatin Public Library. In 1972 fossils were uncovered near Fanno Creek that were determined to be a partial skeleton of a Harlan's ground sloth (Paramylodon harlani).

== Demographics ==
Historical population
Census	Pop.	Note	%±
1920	234		—
1930	198		−15.4%
1940	180		−9.1%
1950	248		37.8%
1960	359		44.8%
1970	750		108.9%
1980	7,348		879.7%
1990	15,013		104.3%
2000	22,791		51.8%
2010	26,054		14.3%
2020	27,942		7.2%
2022 (est.)	27,797		−0.5%
U.S. Decennial Census; 2020 Census

=== 2020 census ===
As of the 2020 census, Tualatin had a population of 27,942, and the median age was 37.5 years. 23.1% of residents were under the age of 18, and 13.9% of residents were 65 years of age or older. For every 100 females there were 95.3 males, and for every 100 females age 18 and over there were 93.3 males age 18 and over.

As of the 2020 census, there were 10,835 households in Tualatin, of which 33.5% had children under the age of 18 living in them. Of all households, 50.4% were married-couple households, 17.1% were households with a male householder and no spouse or partner present, and 25.1% were households with a female householder and no spouse or partner present. About 24.4% of all households were made up of individuals, and 8.8% had someone living alone who was 65 years of age or older. There were 11,171 housing units, of which 3.0% were vacant. Among occupied housing units, 54.5% were owner-occupied and 45.5% were renter-occupied. The homeowner vacancy rate was 0.5% and the rental vacancy rate was 3.9%.

As of the 2020 census, 100.0% of residents lived in urban areas, while 0% lived in rural areas.

Racial composition as of the 2020 census
Race	Number	Percent
White	19,895	71.2%
Black or African American	354	1.3%
American Indian and Alaska Native	243	0.9%
Asian	1,191	4.3%
Native Hawaiian and Other Pacific Islander	325	1.2%
Some other race	2,399	8.6%
Two or more races	3,535	12.7%
Hispanic or Latino (of any race)	5,179	18.5%

=== 2010 census ===
As of the 2010 census, there were 26,054 people, 10,000 households, and 6,762 families living in the city. The population density was 3,169.6 inhabitants per square mile (1,223.8/km^{2}). There were 10,528 housing units at an average density of 1,280.8 per square mile (494.5/km^{2}). The racial makeup of the city was 80.4% White, 1.2% African American, 0.7% Native American, 3.5% Asian, 1.0% Pacific Islander, 8.9% from other races, and 4.2% from two or more races. Hispanic or Latino people of any race were 17.3% of the population.

There were 10,000 households, of which 37.5% had children under the age of 18 living with them, 51.6% were married couples living together, 11.4% had a female householder with no husband present, 4.6% had a male householder with no wife present, and 32.4% were non-families. 24.6% of all households were made up of individuals, and 5.3% had someone living alone who was 65 years of age or older. The average household size was 2.60 and the average family size was 3.12.

The median age in the city was 34.6 years. 26.9% of residents were under the age of 18; 8.5% were between the ages of 18 and 24; 31% were from 25 to 44; 26.8% were from 45 to 64; and 7% were 65 years of age or older. The gender makeup of the city was 49.1% male and 50.9% female.

=== 2000 census ===
As of the 2000 census, there were 22,791 people, 8,651 households, and 5,804 families living in the city. The population density was 2,928.5 inhabitants per square mile (1,130.7/km^{2}). There were 9,218 housing units at an average density of 1,184.4 per square mile (457.3/km^{2}). The racial makeup of the city was 86.89% White, 0.79% African American, 0.69% Native American, 3.62% Asian, 0.37% Pacific Islander, 4.84% from other races, and 2.81% from two or more races. Hispanic or Latino people of any race were 11.85% of the population.

There were 8,651 households, out of which 39.1% had children under the age of 18 living with them, 54.1% were married couples living together, 9.3% had a female householder with no husband present, and 32.9% were non-families. 24.5% of all households were made up of individuals, and 4.6% had someone living alone who was 65 years of age or older. The average household size was 2.62 and the average family size was 3.17.

In the city, the population was spread out, with 28.2% under the age of 18, 9.4% from 18 to 24, 35.6% from 25 to 44, 21.0% from 45 to 64, and 5.8% who were 65 years of age or older. The median age was 32 years. For every 100 females, there were 99.2 males. For every 100 females age 18 and over, there were 96.8 males.

The median income for a household in the city was $55,762, and the median income for a family was $68,165. Males had a median income of $47,004 versus $32,210 for females. The per capita income for the city was $26,694. About 3.0% of families and 5.5% of the population were below the poverty line, including 4.9% of those under age 18 and 3.8% of those age 65 or over.

== Geography ==
According to the United States Census Bureau, the city has a total area of 8.23 square miles (21.32 km^{2}), of which 8.22 square miles (21.29 km^{2}) is land and 0.01 square miles (0.03 km^{2}) is water.

== Economy ==
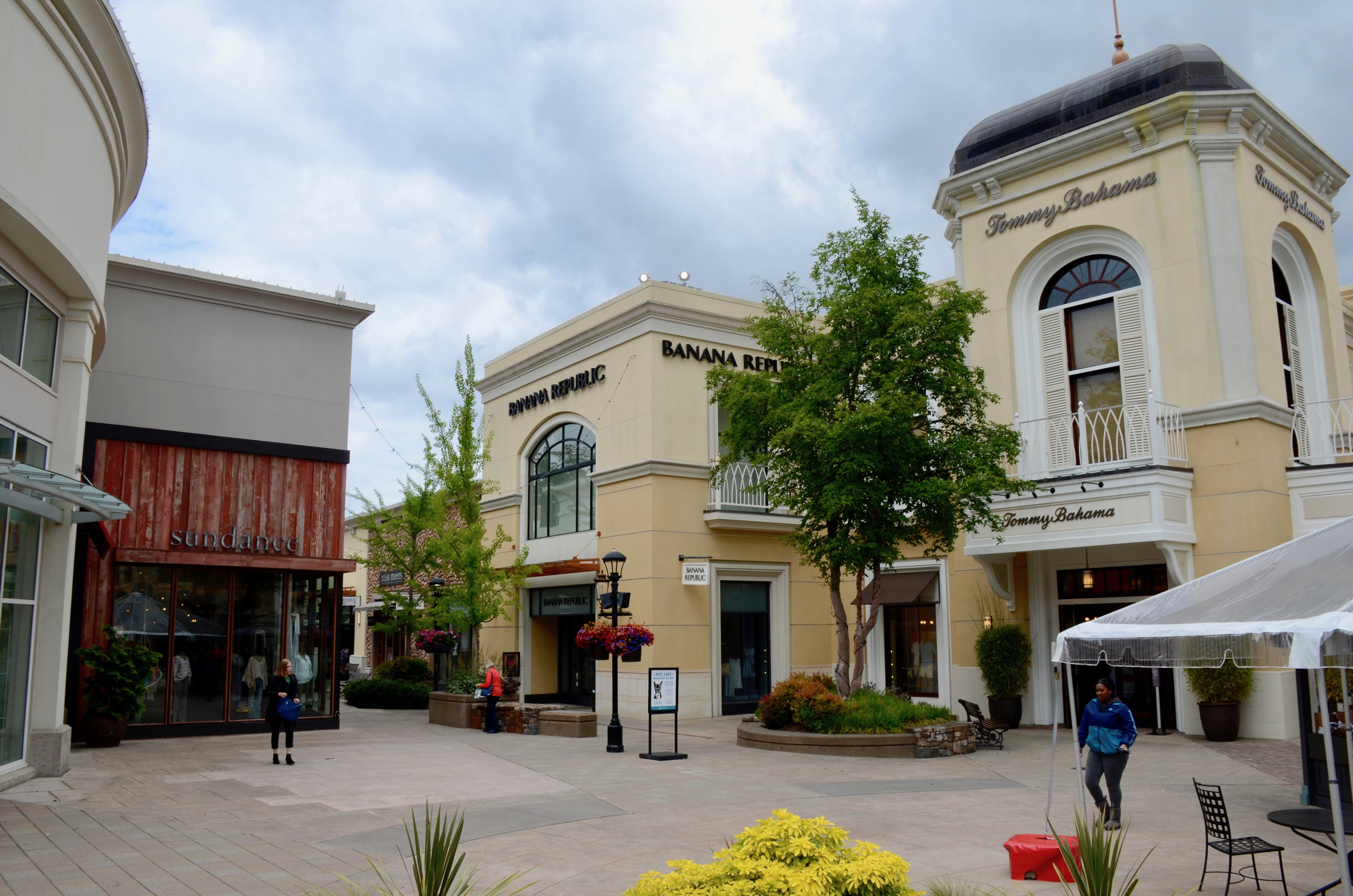
Bridgeport Village

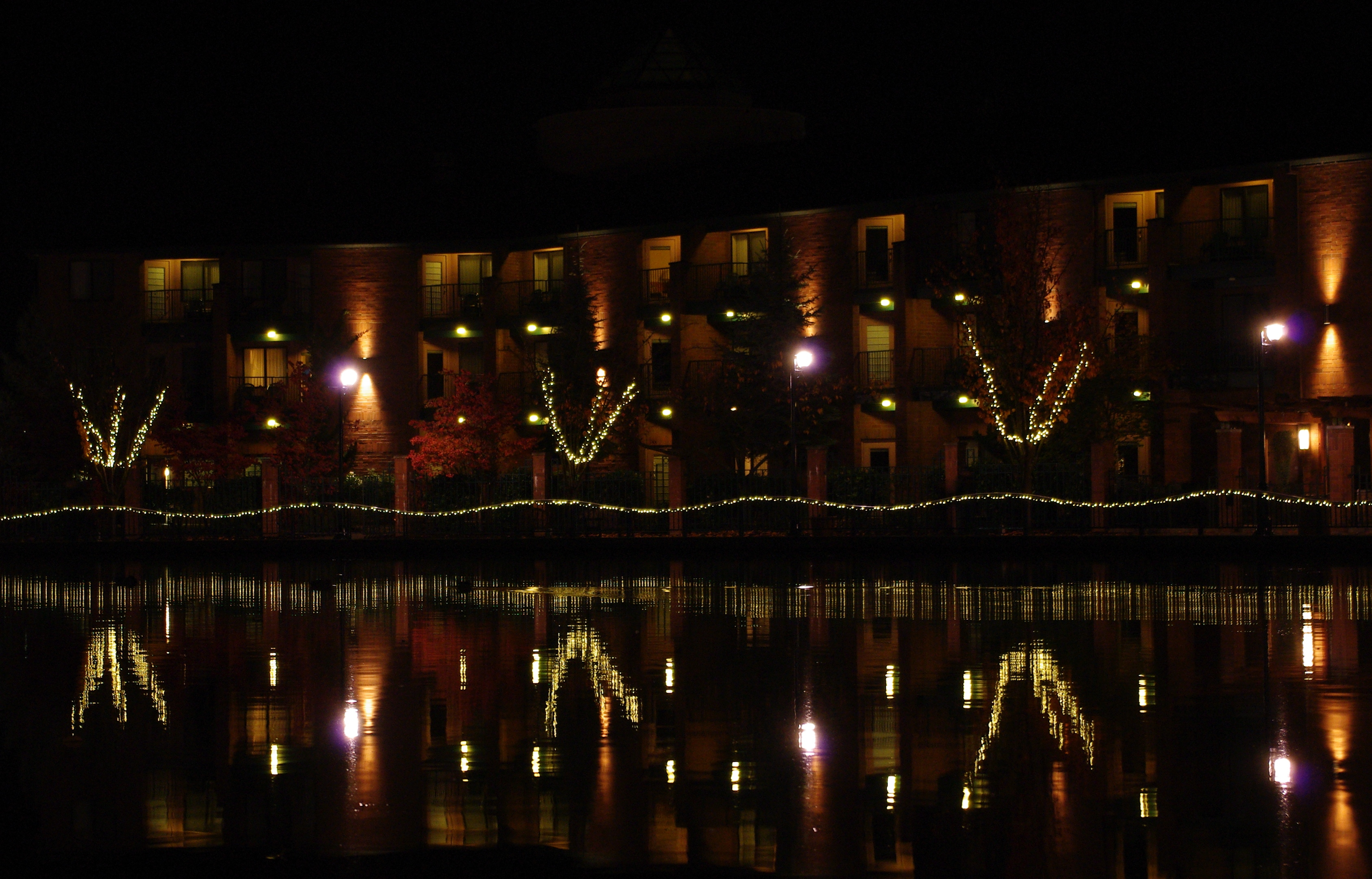
Tualatin Commons at night

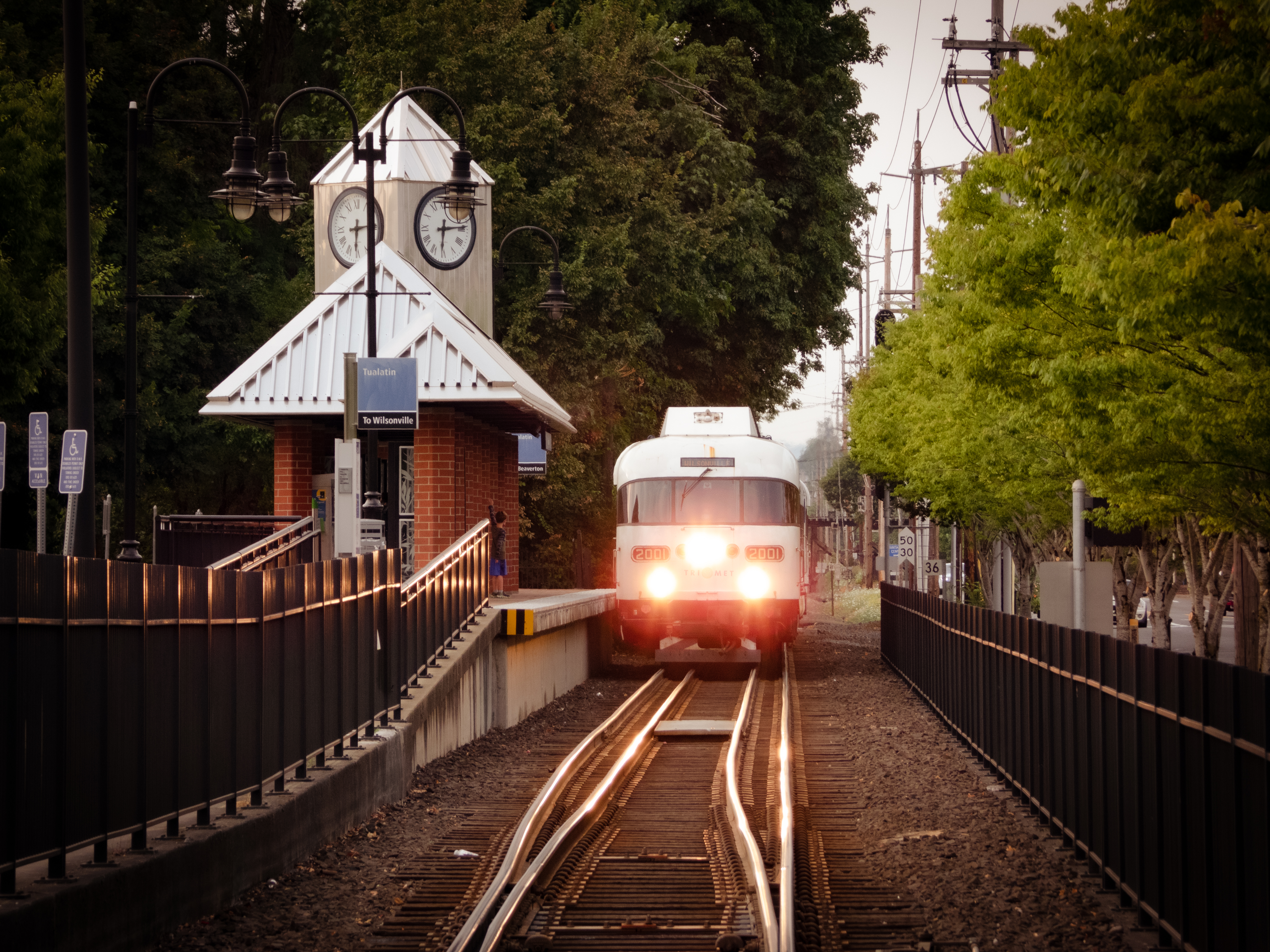
Southbound WES Train pulling into Tualatin Station

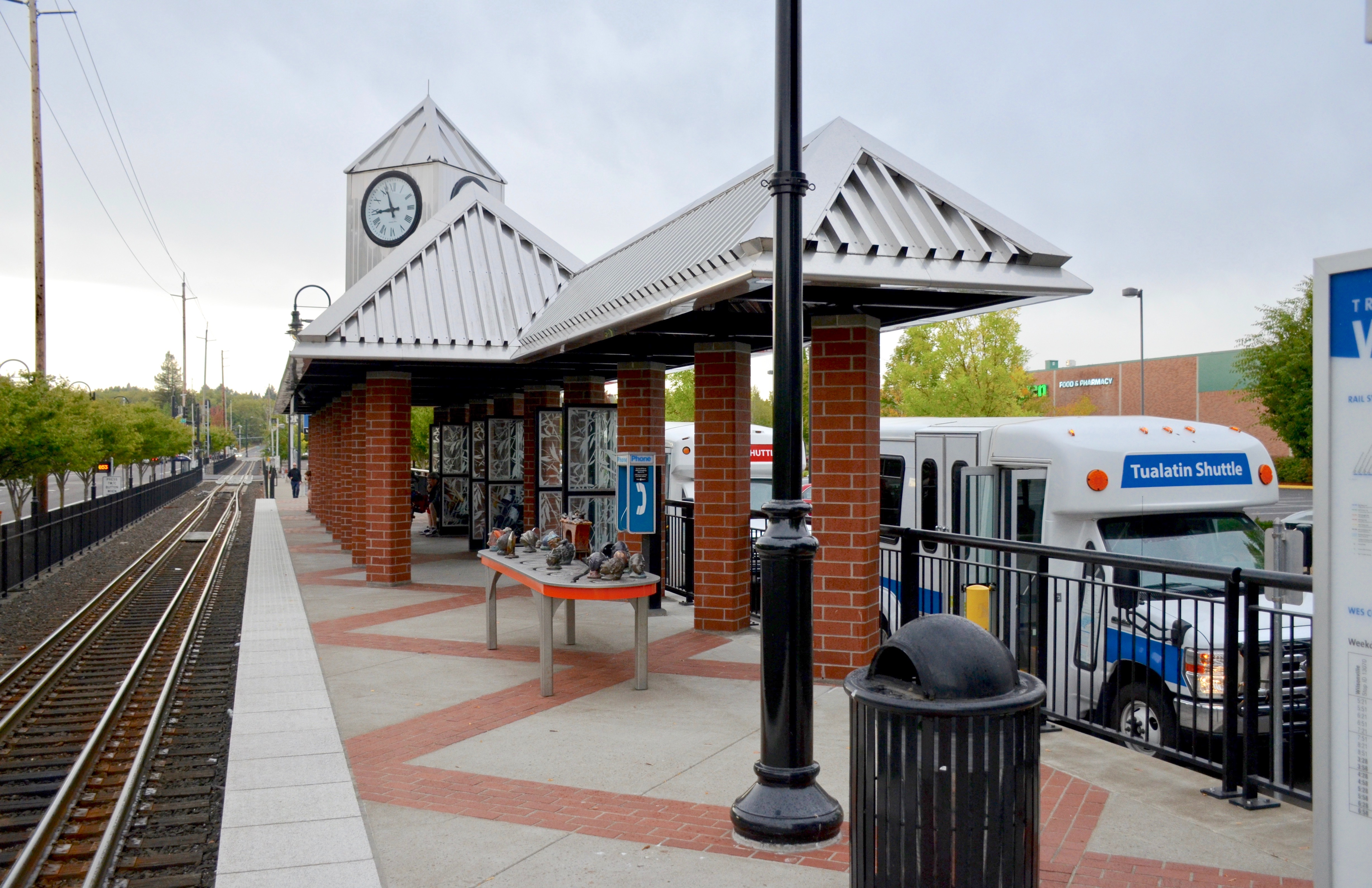
Tualatin Station WES stop

Tualatin is home to a majority of Bridgeport Village ("Bridgeport"), an upscale shopping area that opened in early 2005. (The northern part of Bridgeport Village is in Tigard.) Built at the site of a former quarry, Bridgeport was designed to be reminiscent of an open-air European-style shopping experience. It features an 18-screen movie theater, several national and regional chain restaurants, and many chain retail stores.

Tualatin is also home to Nyberg Woods, a neighborhood and lifestyle center located at the conjunction of Interstate 5 and Nyberg road. Tualatin also harbors Nyberg Rivers, which opened in the fall of 2014 and is the third major retail project to be developed by CenterCal Properties in Tualatin. Following the construction of Bridgeport Village and Nyberg Woods, Nyberg Rivers contains approximately 300,000 square feet of retail, restaurant, fitness, and entertainment space.

There are many factories on the south side of town, including a large Lam Research plant that makes electrochemical deposition tools for manufacturing semiconductors.

Knife manufacturers CRKT and KAI USA, which owns Kershaw and Zero Tolerance Knives, as well as Shun Cutlery are located in Tualatin. Al Mar Knives is headquartered in Tualatin, although manufacturing is done in Japan.

Oregon Scientific, a manufacturer of consumer electronics products, is headquartered in Tualatin.

From the 1960s through the 1980s, Tualatin was the home of Sunn Musical Equipment Company, a manufacturer of musical and sound reinforcement equipment.

Tualatin has been used as a filming location for Hollywood movies, including Thumbsucker, which was filmed at Tualatin High School.

Since 2004, Tualatin has been home to the West Coast Giant Pumpkin Regatta, one of the largest and oldest pumpkin regattas in the country.

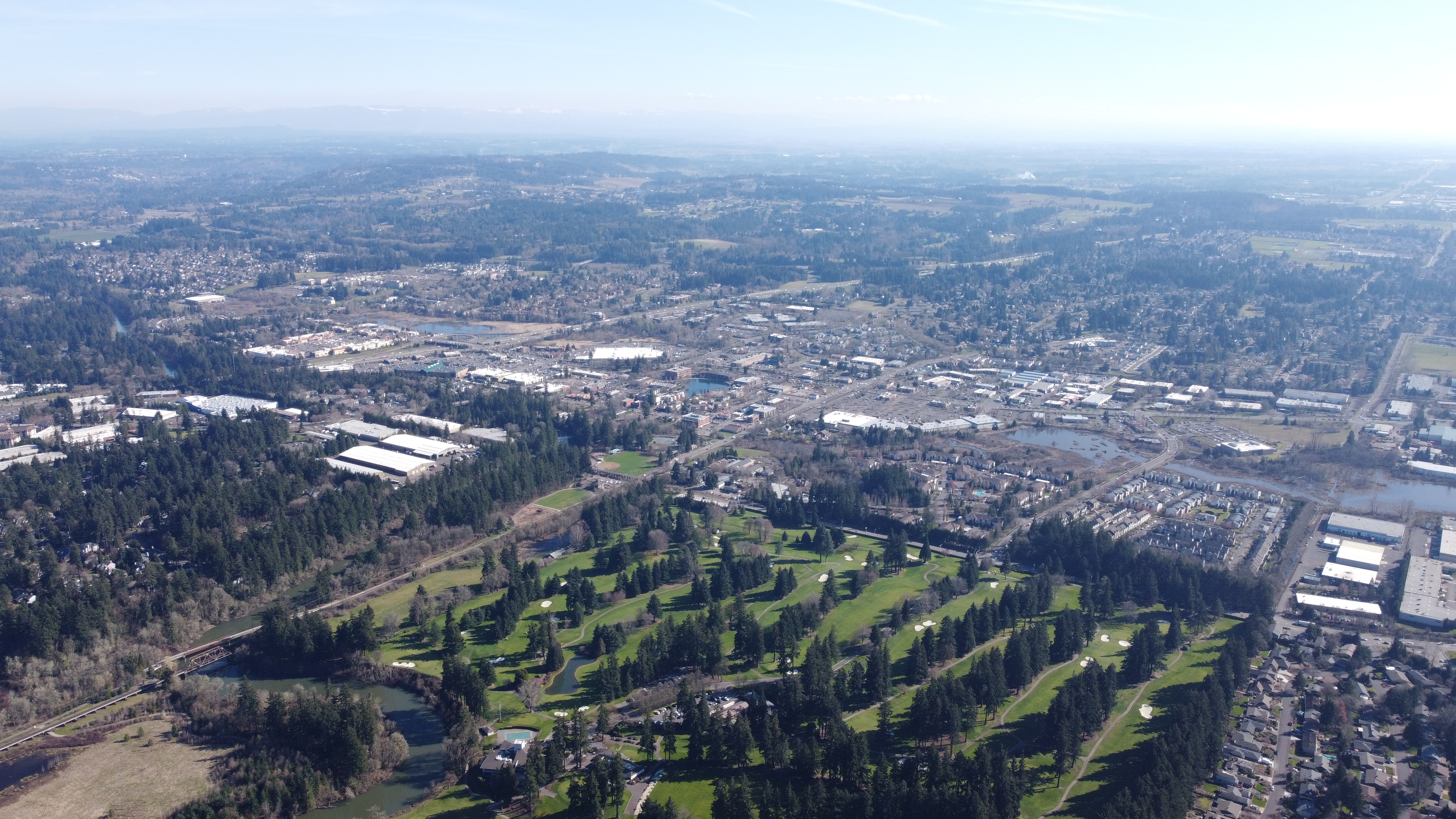
Tualatin from Above

== Infrastructure and services ==
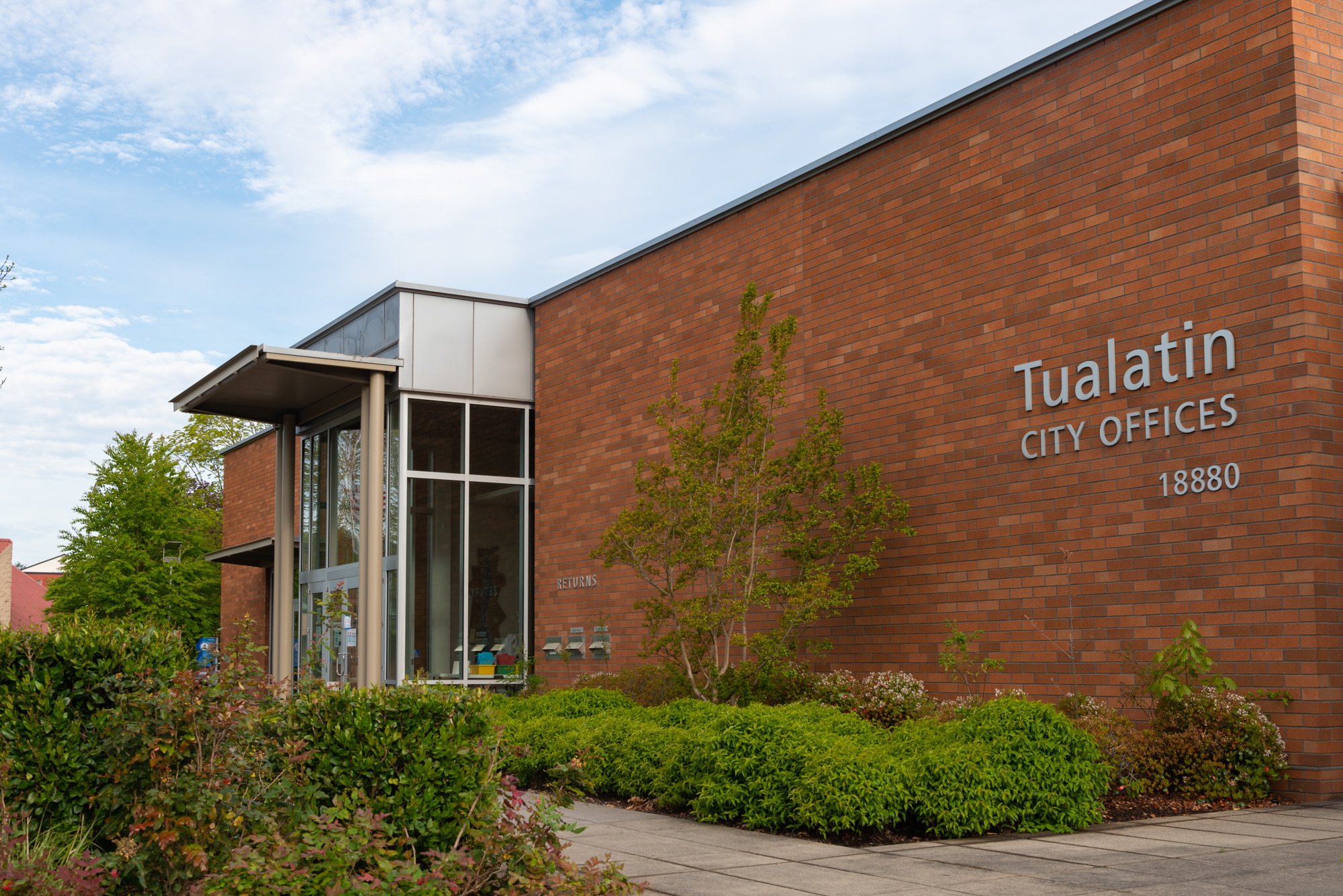
Tualatin City Hall

Tualatin is within the Tri-County Metropolitan Transportation District of Oregon (TriMet), the Portland metropolitan area's primary transit agency. TriMet service includes WES Commuter Rail, at Tualatin Station, and bus lines 36, 37, 38, 76, 96, and 97. Wilsonville-based South Metro Area Regional Transit's route 2X has a stop in Tualatin, at TriMet's Tualatin Park & Ride lot. Despite being served by TriMet, Ride Connection also operates several fixed-route services within Tualatin.

Fire protection and emergency medical services are provided through Tualatin Valley Fire and Rescue. Legacy Meridian Park Hospital is located in Tualatin.

== Education ==
The city of Tualatin falls incompletely under the jurisdiction of the Tigard-Tualatin School District. This district contains 10 elementary schools, three middle schools, and two high schools. Of these, five are actually located within Tualatin city limits: Bridgeport Elementary School, Byrom Elementary School, Tualatin Elementary School, Hazelbrook Middle School, and Tualatin High School.

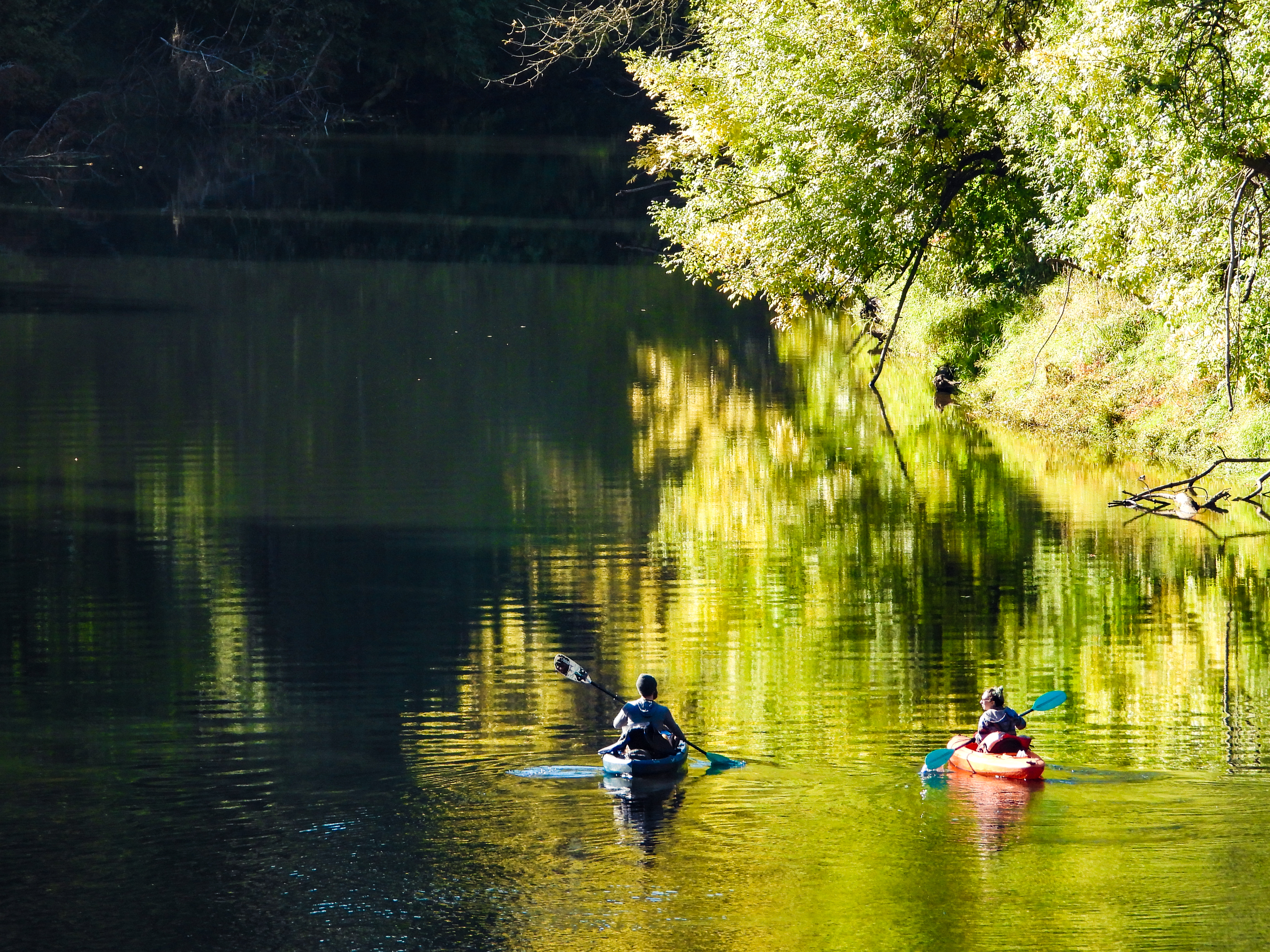
Kayakers on the Tualatin River

=== Public schools ===
==== High schools ====
- Tualatin High School

==== Middle schools ====
- Hazelbrook Middle School

==== Elementary schools ====
- Bridgeport Elementary
- Byrom Elementary
- Tualatin Elementary

A small section of the city is part of the West Linn-Wilsonville School District. Students in this area attend Willamete Primary School (previously Stafford Primary School before its closure in 2026), Athey Creek Middle School, and West Linn High School. Before the rezoning caused by Stafford Primary's closure, students in this area were given a choice between Athey Creek Middle School and Meridian Creek Middle School, and later went to West Linn High School or Wilsonville High School, respectively.

Alberta Rider Elementary School on nearby Bull Mountain feeds into Twality Middle School. Students from Twality then split into either Tualatin or Tigard High School depending on zoning. Deer Creek Elementary School, which is also located on Bull Mountain, splits students between Hazelbrook or Twality Middle School. The students of Twality also split between the two high schools in this scenario.

=== Private schools ===
The Portland Japanese School, a weekend Japanese educational program for Japanese citizens and Japanese Americans, holds its classes at Hazelbrook Middle School at Tualatin. The school began holding its classes there after the school opened in 1992. The school office is in Beaverton.

Additional schools include Arbor School of Arts and Sciences, an independent K–8 school; and Horizon Christian High School.

== Attractions ==
- Browns Ferry Park
- Bridgeport Village

== Media ==
- The Times, a weekly newspaper owned and operated by Portland-based Pamplin Media Group
- Tualatin Life, a monthly newspaper focused exclusively on local news, history and human interest stories

== Notable people ==
- Mike Barrett (born 1968) – sportscaster
- Jordan Chiles (born 2001) – artistic gymnast and Olympian
- Richard Devlin (born 1952) – politician
- Ian Fuller (born 1979) – professional soccer player and assistant manager
- Bret Harrison (born 1982) – actor and musician
- Taylor Hart (born 1991) – National Football League (NFL) player
- Wyatt Houston (born 1994) – NFL player
- Roger Levasa (born 1959) – United States Football League player
- Payton Pritchard (born 1998) – National Basketball Association (NBA) player
- Luke Staley (born 1980) – NFL player
- Katy Steding (born 1967) – Women's National Basketball Association (WNBA) player and women's college basketball coach
- Jarad van Schaik (born 1988) – professional soccer player
- Courtney Verloo (born 1991) – professional soccer player
