= Windsor Pumpkin Regatta =

Annual water race

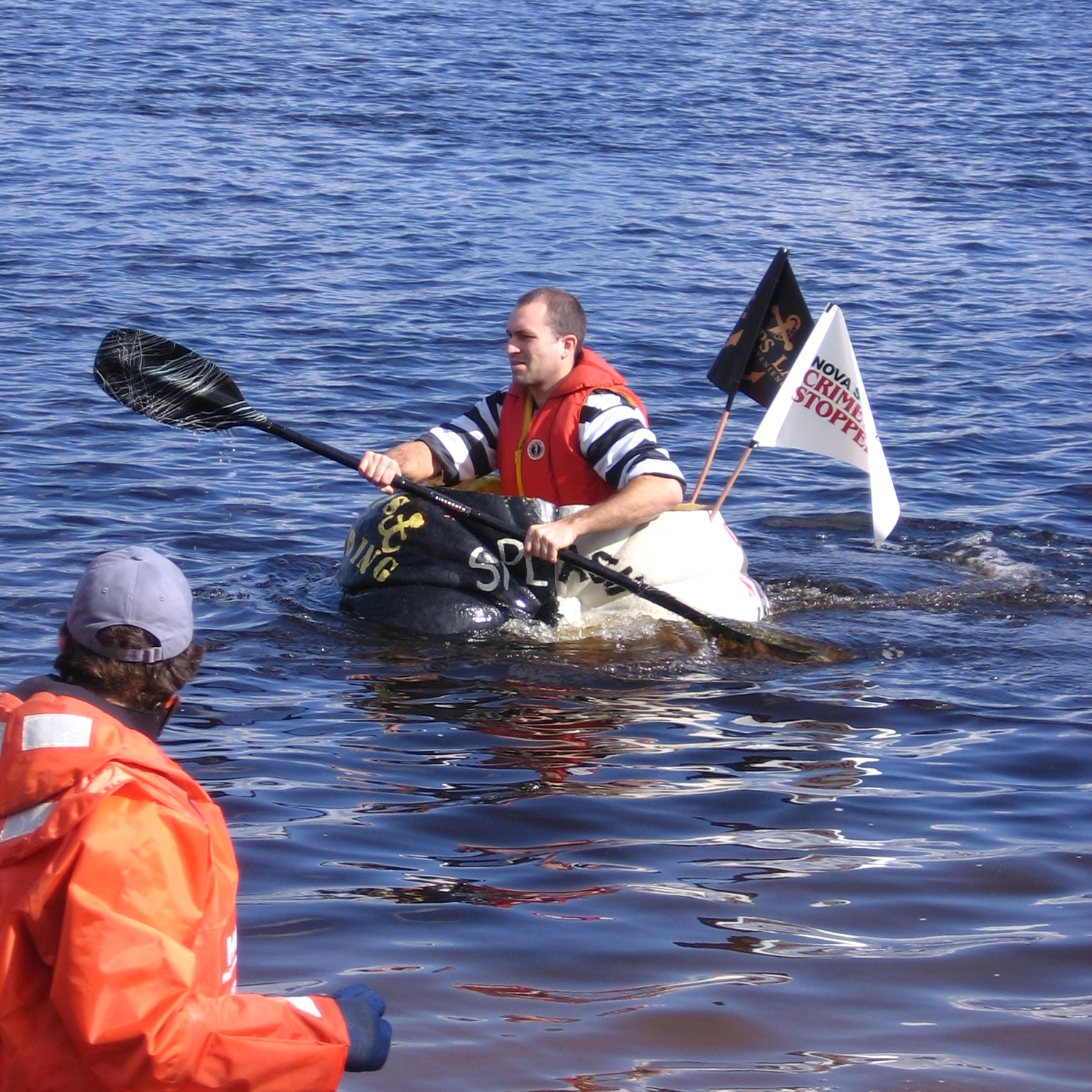
Windsor Pumpkin Regatta

The Windsor Pumpkin Regatta was an annual pumpkin regatta held in October on Lake Pesaquid in Windsor, Nova Scotia. The course is a half mile (800 m) from start to finish. The race features brightly coloured giant pumpkins as the sole means of flotation.

The race was founded in 1999 by Danny Dill, son of Howard Dill, breeder of the Atlantic Giant pumpkin.

Leo Swinimer of New Ross, Nova Scotia has dominated the competition, winning six out of the first ten races, including one at the age of 73. Despite his dominance, the race's popularity continues to grow, with 10,000 spectators and 60 entries in the 2008 race.

There are three classes: motor, experimental and paddling. Not all classes attract competitors each year. The paddling class is the best known and most popular in terms of entries.

The race gained a degree of notability in 2005 when Martha Stewart announced her intention to participate in a race. While her pastel-coloured pumpkin did appear in the race, Ms Stewart could not participate as permission to enter Canada was delayed after her release from incarceration in the ImClone affair; when permission was finally granted, weather prevented her from reaching Nova Scotia on time. Various other celebrity participants have raced, notably local member of parliament Scott Brison, who has appeared in several of the races.

The last event was held in 2019. The 2020 and 2021 regattas were cancelled due to gathering restrictions during the COVID pandemic. In 2022 the government ordered tidal gates under the Highway 101 causeway to be operated in a manner to better accommodate fish passage. This lowered the water level in the lake and the event was cancelled indefinitely.

Windsor was not the first to feature a giant pumpkin as a water-borne craft. That distinction falls to Wayne Hackney of Winchester, New Hampshire who paddled in a pumpkin he grew in 1996. However, the regatta has inspired several other pumpkin regattas, including one at the University of Wisconsin–Madison (held since 2005) and on Lake Champlain (Colchester, Vermont).

== Winners and times – human powered competition ==
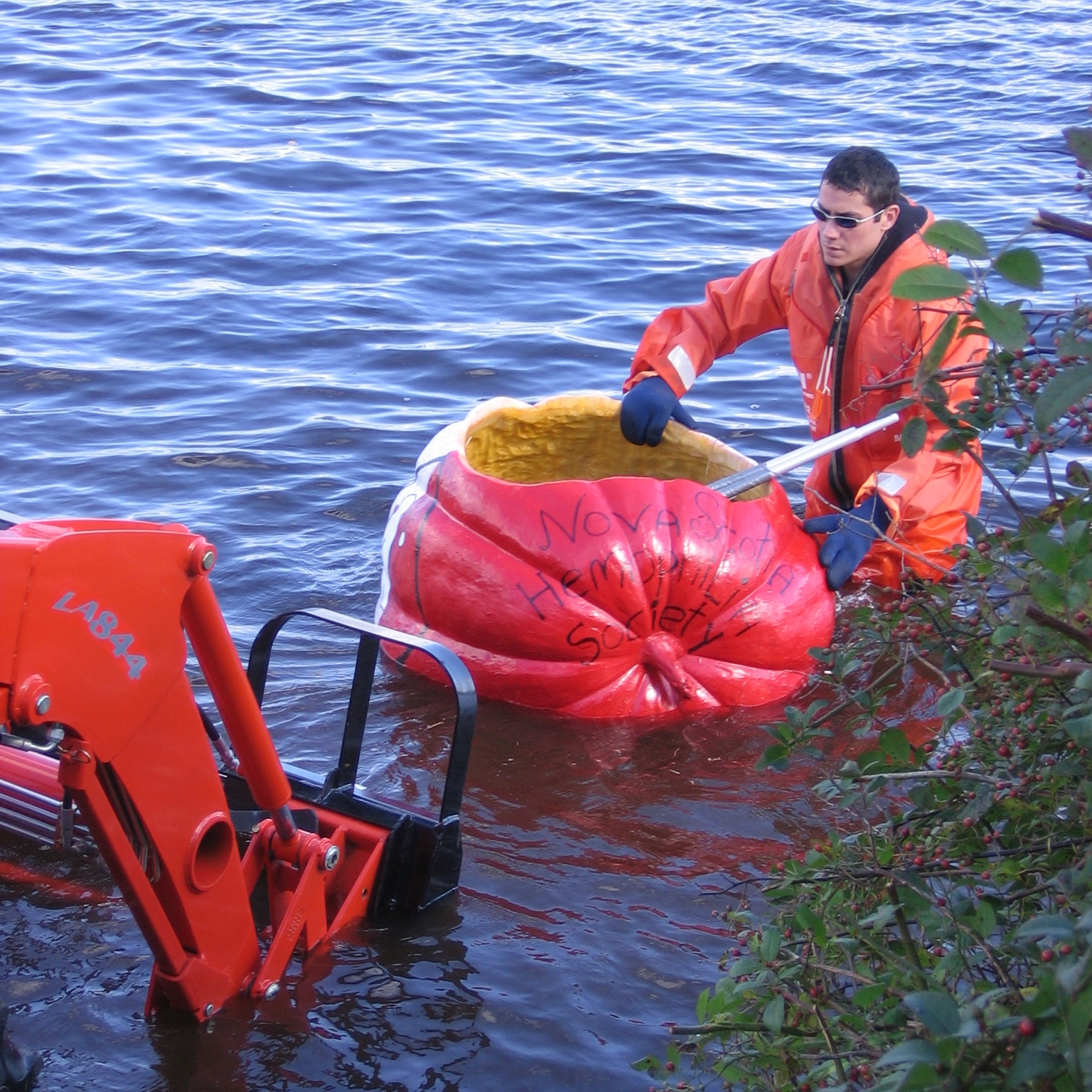
A pumpkin in Lake Pisaquid in 2008

This table is incomplete. You can help by expanding it

Year	Entries	Winner	Winning Time
1999	5	Leo Swinimer	20:00
2000	n/a	Leo Swinimer	19.45
2001	n/a	Leo Swinimer	n/a
2002	n/a	Leo Swinimer	n/a
2003	n/a	Leo Swinimer	n/a
2004	n/a	Leo Swinimer	n/a
2005	n/a	Leo Swinimer	n/a
2006	n/a	Leo Swinimer	n/a
2007	49	Leo Swinimer	10:27
2008	60	Anthony Cook	n/a
2009	54	Will Neily	n/a
2010	n/a	Anthony Cook	n/a
2011	n/a	Joe Seagram	n/a
2013	n/a	Frank Maurice Becker Mueller Junior	5:53
