= Horizon Christian School (Hood River, Oregon) =

Private school in Hood River, Oregon, U.S.

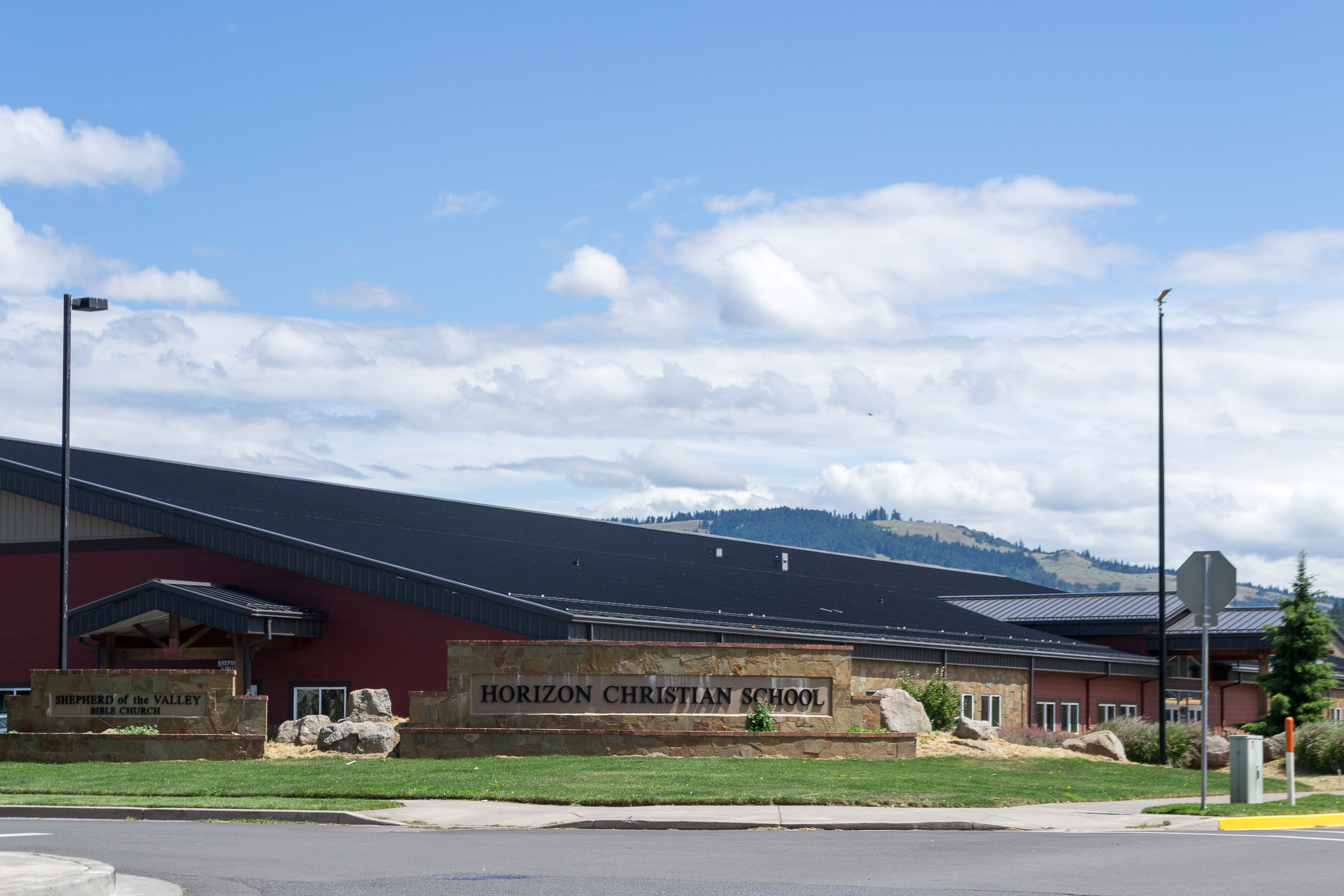

Location
- 700 Pacific Avenue; Hood River, Hood River County, Oregon 97031; United States; 45.6970°N 121.5176°W

Information
- Former names: Shepherd of the Valley Christian School, Summit Christian School
- Type: Private, tuition based
- Motto: Teaching Truth - Changing Lives
- Religious affiliation: Christian
- Denomination: Evangelical
- Opened: 1976
- Superintendent: Carol Yates
- CEEB code: 380477
- NCES School ID: A9300798
- Principal: Nancy Rinella (Elementary)
- Principal: Jennifer Tomka (Secondary)
- Staff: 20
- Faculty: 9
- Teaching staff: 20
- Grades: Pre K-12
- Age: 4 to 19
- Enrollment: 255 (2022)
- Student to teacher ratio: 10:1
- Hours in school day: 7
- Colors: Light red, black, white
- Song: How Great Is Our God - Chris Tomlin
- Athletics conference: OSAA Big Sky League 1A-6
- Mascot: Hawk
- Team name: Hawks
- Rival: Sherman County, Dufur
- Accreditation: ACSI, NAAS
- Affiliation: Evangelical
- Website: www.horizonchristianschool.org

Horizon Christian School is a private Christian school located in Hood River, Oregon, United States.

The school was founded in 1976 and has been accredited by the Association of Christian Schools International since 1978, and by the Northwest Association of Accredited Schools since 1999. In 2018 it was named by Niche as one of the top twenty private schools in Oregon.

In 2020, Horizon Christian School, along with Life Christian School and McMinnville Christian Academy, sued Oregon Governor Kate Brown over COVID restrictions, claiming that "Brown violated the First Amendment by saying public universities can remain open for in-person classes if they comply with safety measures, while houses of worship and faith-based gatherings are still limited." U.S. District Court Judge Michael W. Mosman denied a preliminary injunction demanded by the schools.

The Horizon Hawks compete in the Oregon School Activities Association Big Sky League (1A-6). They are not to be confused with Horizon Christian School in Tualatin, Oregon, whose teams are also known as the Hawks but compete in the West Valley League (3A-2).
