= Horizon Christian School (Tualatin, Oregon) =

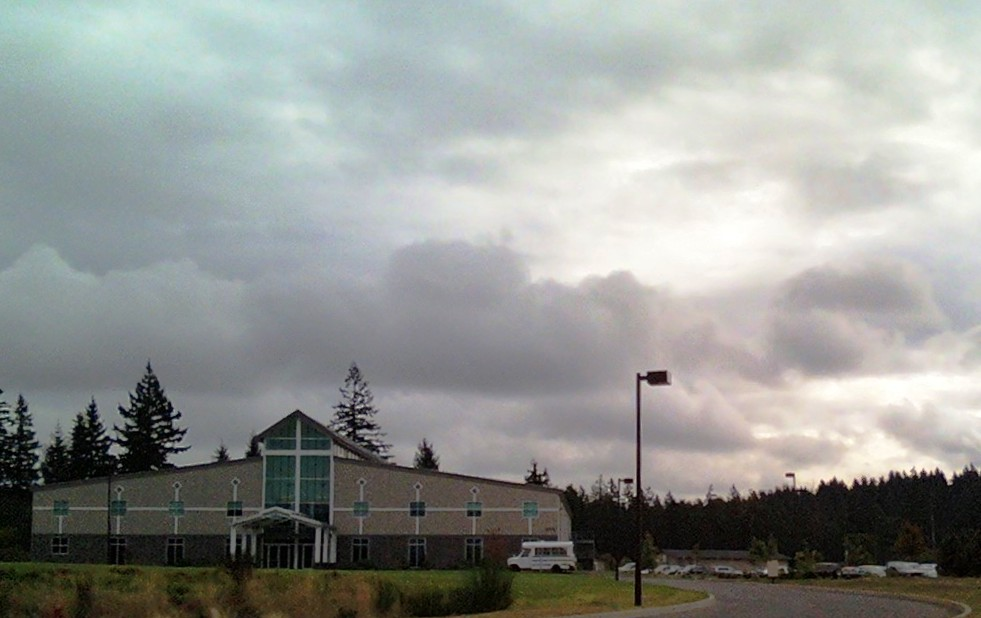

Location
- 23370 SW Boones Ferry Road and 7400 SW Sagert Street; Tualatin, Washington County, Oregon 97062; United States; 45.350754°N 122.770661°W

Information
- Type: private
- Opened: 1981
- Principal: Scott Olson and Judi Smith
- Grades: PreK-12
- Enrollment: 400
- Colors: Purple, black, and gold
- Athletics conference: OSAA West Valley League 3A-2
- Mascot: Hawks
- Rival: Riverside High School (Tualatin, Oregon)
- Accreditation: ACSI
- Affiliation: Christian
- Website: www.horizonchristian.school

Horizon Christian School is a private Christian high school in Tualatin, Oregon, United States.

The school was a member of the Association of Christian Schools International from 1980 to 2011. It is accredited with Cognia.

The Horizon Hawks compete in the Oregon School Activities Association West Valley League (3A-2). They are not to be confused with Horizon Christian School in Hood River, Oregon, whose teams are also known as the Hawks but compete in the Big Sky League (1A-6).
