= Brown's Ferry Park (South Carolina) =

- Interactive map of Brown's Ferry Park
- Type: Natural park
- Location: 11547 Browns Ferry Road, Georgetown, SC 29440, US
- Coordinates: 33°32′47″N 79°24′19″W

Brown's Ferry Park in South Carolina was a park on Old Brown's Ferry Road in Georgetown County, South Carolina. The park, which was located adjacent to the Black River, was closed in 2008.
