= Brown's Ferry Park (Tualatin, Oregon) =

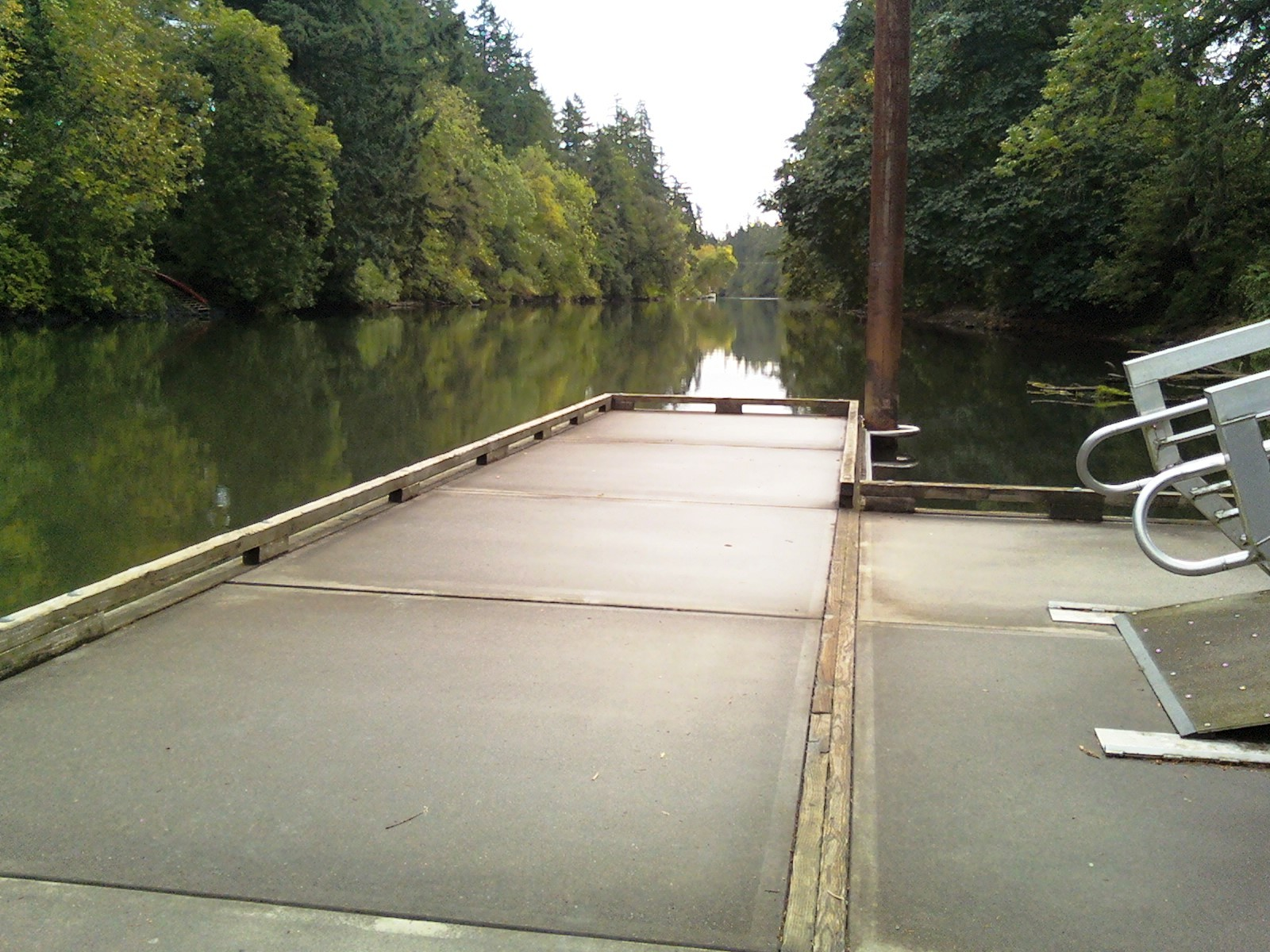
- Dock on the Tualatin River at the park
- Interactive map of Brown's Ferry Park
- Type: Public, city
- Location: Tualatin, Oregon; United States
- Coordinates: 45°23′01″N 122°44′14″W
- Area: 28.33 acres (114,600 m^{2})
- Operator: City of Tualatin
- Status: Open
- Website: Website

Brown's Ferry Park is a 28-acre (11 ha) park in the Clackamas County portion of the city of Tualatin in the U.S. state of Oregon. The park is located along the Tualatin River.

It is named for Zenas J. Brown who operated the first ferry in the Tualatin area, and who claimed land at this location in 1850 through the Donation Land Act.

The park includes walking paths, picnic tables, kayak and canoe rentals and a canoe ramp and dock, a wildlife viewing blind, a river overlook platform, and an old barn with interpretative signage.
