= List of University of Chicago Press journals =

The Journals Division of the University of Chicago Press, in partnership with 27 learned and professional societies and associations, foundations, museums, and other not-for-profit organizations, currently publishes and distributes 81 peer-reviewed academic journal titles. These influential scholarly publications present original research in the social sciences, the humanities, education, and the biological, medical, and physical sciences. The following list includes the journals currently published by the University of Chicago Press.

== Art and art history ==
- Afterall: A Journal of Art, Context, and Enquiry
- American Art
- Archives of American Art Journal
- Art Documentation
- Bulletin of the Detroit Institute of Arts (2019)
- Gesta
- Getty Research Journal
- Journal of the Warburg and Courtauld Institutes
- Metropolitan Museum Journal
- Portable Gray (2019)
- Res: Anthropology and Aesthetics
- Source: Notes in the History of Art
- Speculum
- I Tatti Studies in the Italian Renaissance
- West 86th
- Winterthur Portfolio

== Biological, physical, and medical sciences ==
- The American Naturalist
- The Biological Bulletin
- Freshwater Science
- International Journal of Plant Sciences
- The Journal of Geology
- Physiological and Biochemical Zoology
- The Quarterly Review of Biology

== Economics ==
- American Journal of Health Economics
- Economic Development and Cultural Change
- Entrepreneurship and Innovation Policy and the Economy
- Environmental and Energy Policy and the Economy
- Innovation Policy and the Economy
- Journal of the Association of Environmental and Research Economists
- Journal of Human Capital
- Journal of Labor Economics
- The Journal of Law and Economics
- Journal of Political Economy
- Marine Resource Economics
- National Tax Journal
- NBER Macroeconomics Annual
- NBER Seminar on Macroeconomics
- Review of Environmental Economics and Policy
- Supreme Court Economic Review
- Tax Policy and the Economy

== Education ==
- American Journal of Education
- Comparative Education Review
- Elementary School Journal
- Schools: Studies in Education

== History ==
- American Journal of Archaeology
- American Political Thought
- The British Journal for the Philosophy of Science
- Bulletin of the American Society of Overseas Research
- Critical Historical Studies
- Environmental History
- History of Humanities
- History of Religions
- HOPOS: The Journal of the International Society for the History of Philosophy of Science
- Isis
- The Journal of African American History
- Journal of Anthropological Research
- Journal of Cuneiform Studies
- The Journal of Modern History
- Journal of Near Eastern Studies
- Journal of the Warburg and Courtauld Institutes
- KNOW: A Journal on the Formation of Knowledge
- Near Eastern Archaeology
- Osiris
- Res: Anthropology and Aesthetics
- The Social History of Alcohol and Drugs: An Interdisciplinary Journal
- Source: Notes in the History of Art
- The Wordsworth Circle

== Humanities ==
- Classical Philology
- Critical Historical Studies
- Critical Inquiry
- English Literary Renaissance
- Ethics
- HAU: Journal of Ethnographic Theory
- History of Humanities
- History of Religions
- HOPOS: The Journal of the International Society for the History of Philosophy of Science
- International Journal of American Linguistics
- Isis
- The Journal of Religion
- KNOW: A Journal on the Formation of Knowledge
- The Library Quarterly
- Modern Philology
- Osiris
- Papers of the Bibliographical Society of America
- Philosophy of Science
- Renaissance Drama
- Renaissance Quarterly
- Signs and Society
- Signs: Journal of Women in Culture and Society
- Speculum
- Spenser Studies: A Renaissance Poetry Annual (2018)
- The Wordsworth Circle (2019)

== Law and politics ==
- American Political Thought
- Crime and Justice
- Journal of Law and Courts
- The Journal of Law and Economics
- The Journal of Legal Studies
- The Journal of Politics
- Polity
- Social Service Review
- Supreme Court Economic Review
- Supreme Court Review

== Science ==
- The American Naturalist
- The Biological Bulletin
- Freshwater Science
- International Journal of Plant Sciences
- The Journal of Geology
- Physiological and Biochemical Zoology
- The Quarterly Review of Biology

== Social sciences ==
- American Journal of Sociology
- American Political Thought
- Bulletin of the American Schools of Oriental Research (2019)
- The China Journal
- Crime and Justice
- Current Anthropology
- The Journal of Cuneiform Studies (2019)
- HAU: Journal of Ethnographic Theory (2018)
- The Journal of African American History (2018)
- Journal of Anthropological Research
- Journal of the Association for Consumer Research
- The Journal of Modern History
- Near Eastern Archaeology (2019)
- Journal of Near Eastern Studies
- The Journal of Politics
- Polity
- Journal of the Society of Social Work and Research
- The Social History of Alcohol and Drugs (2019)
- Social Service Review

== See also ==
- University of Chicago Press
- Association of University Presses
