= Wimer =

Wimer is a surname. Notable people with the surname include:

- John Wimer (1810–1863), American politician
- Marie Wimer, American tennis player
- Ross Wimer, American architect

== See also ==
- Wimer, Oregon
- Wimer Bridge
- James Wimer Octagonal Barn
- Wimmer
