= List of presidents of the United States =

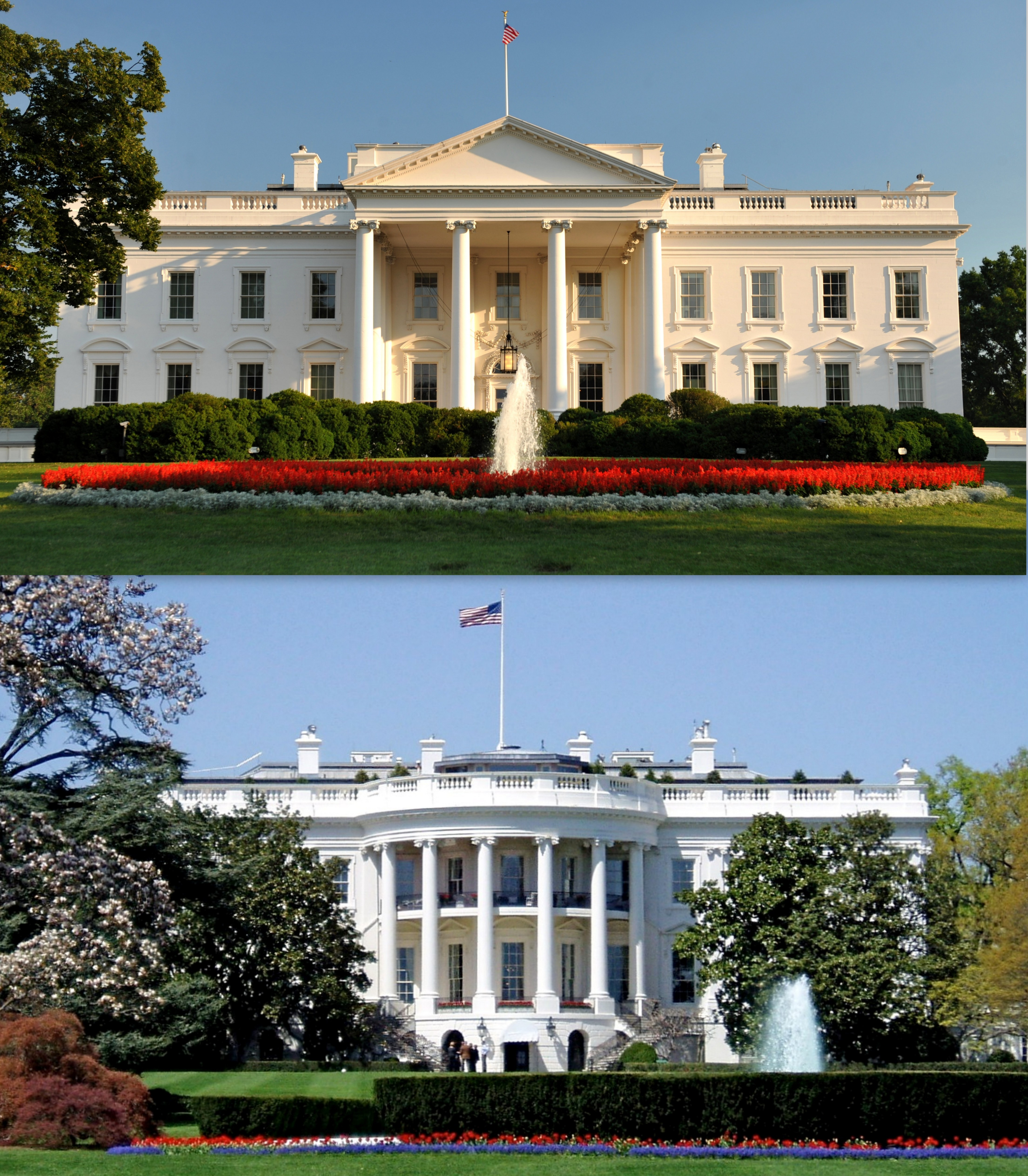
The White House's north and south sides, official residence of the president of the United States

The president of the United States is the head of state and head of government of the United States, indirectly elected to a four-year term via the Electoral College. Under the U.S. Constitution, the officeholder leads the executive branch of the federal government and is the commander-in-chief of the United States Armed Forces.

The first president, George Washington, won a unanimous vote of the Electoral College. The incumbent president is Donald Trump, who assumed office on January 20, 2025. Since the office was established in 1789, 45 men have served in 47 presidencies. The discrepancy is due to the nonconsecutive terms of Grover Cleveland (counted as the 22nd and 24th president) and Donald Trump (counted as the 45th and 47th president).

The presidency of William Henry Harrison, who died 31 days after taking office in 1841, was the shortest in American history. Franklin D. Roosevelt served the longest, over twelve years, before dying early in his fourth term in 1945. He is the only U.S. president to have served more than two terms. Since the ratification of the Twenty-second Amendment to the United States Constitution in 1951, no person may be elected president more than twice, and no one who has served more than two years of a term to which someone else was elected may be elected more than once.

Four presidents died in office of natural causes (William Henry Harrison, Zachary Taylor, Warren G. Harding, and Franklin D. Roosevelt), four were assassinated (Abraham Lincoln, James A. Garfield, William McKinley, and John F. Kennedy), and one resigned (Richard Nixon, facing impeachment and removal from office). John Tyler was the first vice president to assume the presidency during a presidential term, setting the precedent that a vice president who does so becomes the fully functioning president with a new, distinct administration.

Throughout most of its history, American politics has been dominated by political parties. The Constitution is silent on the issue of political parties, and at the time it came into force in 1789, no organized parties existed. Soon after the 1st Congress convened, political factions began rallying around dominant members of Washington's cabinet, such as Alexander Hamilton and Thomas Jefferson. Concerned about the capacity of political parties to destroy the fragile unity holding the nation together, Washington remained unaffiliated with any political faction or party throughout his eight-year presidency. He remains the only U.S. president who never affiliated with a political party.

== Presidents ==
List of all presidents of the United States.
| No. (Note: Presidents are numbered according to uninterrupted periods served by the same person. For example, George Washington served two consecutive terms and is counted as the first president, instead of the first and second, but Grover Cleveland and Donald Trump are counted twice because their two terms were not consecutive. A vice president who temporarily becomes acting president under the Twenty-fifth Amendment to the Constitution is not counted, because the president remains in office during such a period.) | Portrait | Name (birth–death) | Term | Party (Note: Reflects the president's political party at the start of their presidency. Changes during their time in office are noted. Also reflects the vice president's political party unless otherwise noted beside the individual's name.) | Election | Vice President |
|---|---|---|---|---|---|---|
| 1 | Painting of George Washington | George Washington (1732–1799) | April 30, 1789 – March 4, 1797 | Unaffiliated | 1788–89 | John Adams (Note: Political parties had not been anticipated when the Constitution was drafted, nor did they exist at the time of the first presidential election in 1788–89. When they did develop, during Washington's first term, Adams joined the faction that became the Federalist Party. The elections of 1792 were the first ones in the United States that were contested on anything resembling a partisan basis.) |
| 1 | Painting of George Washington | George Washington (1732–1799) | April 30, 1789 – March 4, 1797 | Unaffiliated | 1792 | John Adams |
| 2 | Painting of John Adams | John Adams (1735–1826) | March 4, 1797 – March 4, 1801 | Federalist | 1796 | Thomas Jefferson (Note: The 1796 presidential election was the first contested American presidential election and the only one in which a president and vice president were elected from opposing political parties. Federalist John Adams was elected president, and Jefferson of the Democratic-Republicans was elected vice president.) |
| 3 | Painting of Thomas Jefferson | Thomas Jefferson (1743–1826) | March 4, 1801 – March 4, 1809 | Democratic- Republican | 1800 | Aaron Burr |
| 3 | Painting of Thomas Jefferson | Thomas Jefferson (1743–1826) | March 4, 1801 – March 4, 1809 | Democratic- Republican | 1804 | George Clinton |
| 4 | Painting of James Madison | James Madison (1751–1836) | March 4, 1809 – March 4, 1817 | Democratic- Republican | 1808 | George Clinton (Note: Died in office) |
| 4 | Painting of James Madison | James Madison (1751–1836) | March 4, 1809 – March 4, 1817 | Democratic- Republican | 1808 | Vacant after April 20, 1812 |
| 4 | Painting of James Madison | James Madison (1751–1836) | March 4, 1809 – March 4, 1817 | Democratic- Republican | 1812 | Elbridge Gerry |
| 4 | Painting of James Madison | James Madison (1751–1836) | March 4, 1809 – March 4, 1817 | Democratic- Republican | 1812 | Vacant after November 23, 1814 |
| 5 | Painting of James Monroe | James Monroe (1758–1831) | March 4, 1817 – March 4, 1825 | Democratic- Republican | 1816 | Daniel D. Tompkins |
| 5 | Painting of James Monroe | James Monroe (1758–1831) | March 4, 1817 – March 4, 1825 | Democratic- Republican | 1820 | Daniel D. Tompkins |
| 6 | Painting of John Quincy Adams | John Quincy Adams (1767–1848) | March 4, 1825 – March 4, 1829 | Democratic- Republican (Note: Early during John Quincy Adams' term, the Democratic-Republican Party dissolved; his allies in Congress and at the state level were referred to as "Adams' Men" during the Adams presidency. When Andrew Jackson became president in 1829, this group became the "Anti-Jackson" opposition, and organized themselves as the National Republican Party.) | 1824 | John C. Calhoun (Note: John Calhoun, formerly a Democratic-Republican, founded the Nullifier Party in 1828 to oppose the Tariff of 1828 and advance the cause of states' rights, but was brought on as Andrew Jackson's running mate in the 1828 presidential election in an effort to broaden the democratic coalition led by Jackson.) |
| 6 | Painting of John Quincy Adams | John Quincy Adams (1767–1848) | March 4, 1825 – March 4, 1829 | National Republican | 1824 | John C. Calhoun |
| 7 | Painting of Andrew Jackson | Andrew Jackson (1767–1845) | March 4, 1829 – March 4, 1837 | Democratic | 1828 | John C. Calhoun (Note: Resigned from office) |
| 7 | Painting of Andrew Jackson | Andrew Jackson (1767–1845) | March 4, 1829 – March 4, 1837 | Democratic | 1828 | Vacant after December 28, 1832 |
| 7 | Painting of Andrew Jackson | Andrew Jackson (1767–1845) | March 4, 1829 – March 4, 1837 | Democratic | 1832 | Martin Van Buren |
| 8 | | Martin Van Buren (1782–1862) | March 4, 1837 – March 4, 1841 | Democratic | 1836 | Richard Mentor Johnson |
| 9 | | William Henry Harrison (1773–1841) | March 4, 1841 – April 4, 1841 | Whig | 1840 | John Tyler |
| 10 | | John Tyler (1790–1862) | April 4, 1841 (Note: John Tyler succeeded to the presidency upon the death of William Henry Harrison.) – March 4, 1845 | Whig (Note: John Tyler was elected vice president on the Whig Party ticket in 1840. His policy priorities as president soon proved to be opposed to most of the Whig agenda, and he was expelled from the party five months after assuming office.) | – | Vacant throughout presidency |
| 10 | | John Tyler (1790–1862) | April 4, 1841 – March 4, 1845 | Unaffiliated | – | Vacant throughout presidency |
| 11 | Black-and-white photographic portrait of James K. Polk | James K. Polk (1795–1849) | March 4, 1845 – March 4, 1849 | Democratic | 1844 | George M. Dallas |
| 12 | Black-and-white photographic portrait of Zachary Taylor | Zachary Taylor (1784–1850) | March 4, 1849 – July 9, 1850 | Whig | 1848 | Millard Fillmore |
| 13 | Black-and-white photographic portrait of Millard Fillmore | Millard Fillmore (1800–1874) | July 9, 1850 (Note: Millard Fillmore succeeded to the presidency upon the death of Zachary Taylor.) – March 4, 1853 | Whig | – | Vacant throughout presidency |
| 14 | Black-and-white photographic portrait of Franklin Pierce | Franklin Pierce (1804–1869) | March 4, 1853 – March 4, 1857 | Democratic | 1852 | William R. King |
| 14 | Black-and-white photographic portrait of Franklin Pierce | Franklin Pierce (1804–1869) | March 4, 1853 – March 4, 1857 | Democratic | 1852 | Vacant after April 18, 1853 |
| 15 | Black-and-white photographic portrait of James Buchanan | James Buchanan (1791–1868) | March 4, 1857 – March 4, 1861 | Democratic | 1856 | John C. Breckinridge |
| 16 | Black-and-white photographic portrait of Abraham Lincoln | Abraham Lincoln (1809–1865) | March 4, 1861 – April 15, 1865 | Republican | 1860 | Hannibal Hamlin |
| 16 | Black-and-white photographic portrait of Abraham Lincoln | Abraham Lincoln (1809–1865) | March 4, 1861 – April 15, 1865 | National Union (Note: When he ran for reelection in 1864, Republican Abraham Lincoln formed a bipartisan electoral alliance with War Democrats by selecting Democrat Andrew Johnson as his running mate, and running on the National Union Party ticket.) | 1864 | Andrew Johnson |
| 17 | Black-and-white photographic portrait of Andrew Johnson | Andrew Johnson (1808–1875) | April 15, 1865 (Note: Andrew Johnson succeeded to the presidency upon the death of Abraham Lincoln.) – March 4, 1869 | National Union (Note: While president, Andrew Johnson tried and failed to build a coalition of loyalists under the National Union banner. Near the end of his presidency, Johnson began reassociating with the Democratic Party.) | – | Vacant throughout presidency |
| 17 | Black-and-white photographic portrait of Andrew Johnson | Andrew Johnson (1808–1875) | April 15, 1865 – March 4, 1869 | Democratic | – | Vacant throughout presidency |
| 18 | Black-and-white photographic portrait of Ulysses S. Grant | Ulysses S. Grant (1822–1885) | March 4, 1869 – March 4, 1877 | Republican | 1868 | Schuyler Colfax |
| 18 | Black-and-white photographic portrait of Ulysses S. Grant | Ulysses S. Grant (1822–1885) | March 4, 1869 – March 4, 1877 | Republican | 1872 | Henry Wilson |
| 18 | Black-and-white photographic portrait of Ulysses S. Grant | Ulysses S. Grant (1822–1885) | March 4, 1869 – March 4, 1877 | Republican | 1872 | Vacant after November 22, 1875 |
| 19 | Black-and-white photographic portrait of Rutherford B. Hayes | Rutherford B. Hayes (1822–1893) | March 4, 1877 – March 4, 1881 | Republican | 1876 | William A. Wheeler |
| 20 | Black-and-white photographic portrait of James A. Garfield | James A. Garfield (1831–1881) | March 4, 1881 – September 19, 1881 | Republican | 1880 | Chester A. Arthur |
| 21 | Sepia photographic portrait of Chester A. Arthur | Chester A. Arthur (1829–1886) | September 19, 1881 (Note: Chester A. Arthur succeeded to the presidency upon the death of James A. Garfield.) – March 4, 1885 | Republican | – | Vacant throughout presidency |
| 22 | | Grover Cleveland (1837–1908); 1st term | March 4, 1885 – March 4, 1889 | Democratic | 1884 | Thomas A. Hendricks |
| 22 | | Grover Cleveland (1837–1908); 1st term | March 4, 1885 – March 4, 1889 | Democratic | 1884 | Vacant after November 25, 1885 |
| 23 | Black-and-white photographic portrait of Benjamin Harrison | Benjamin Harrison (1833–1901) | March 4, 1889 – March 4, 1893 | Republican | 1888 | Levi P. Morton |
| 24 | Black-and-white photographic portrait of Grover Cleveland | Grover Cleveland (1837–1908); 2nd term | March 4, 1893 – March 4, 1897 | Democratic | 1892 | Adlai Stevenson I |
| 25 | Black-and-white photographic portrait of William McKinley | William McKinley (1843–1901) | March 4, 1897 – September 14, 1901 | Republican | 1896 | Garret Hobart |
| 25 | Black-and-white photographic portrait of William McKinley | William McKinley (1843–1901) | March 4, 1897 – September 14, 1901 | Republican | 1896 | Vacant after November 21, 1899 |
| 25 | Black-and-white photographic portrait of William McKinley | William McKinley (1843–1901) | March 4, 1897 – September 14, 1901 | Republican | 1900 | Theodore Roosevelt |
| 26 | Photographic portrait of Theodore Roosevelt | Theodore Roosevelt (1858–1919) | September 14, 1901 (Note: Theodore Roosevelt succeeded to the presidency upon the death of William McKinley.) – March 4, 1909 | Republican | – | Vacant through March 4, 1905 |
| 26 | Photographic portrait of Theodore Roosevelt | Theodore Roosevelt (1858–1919) | September 14, 1901 – March 4, 1909 | Republican | 1904 | Charles W. Fairbanks |
| 27 | Black-and-white photographic portrait of William Howard Taft | William Howard Taft (1857–1930) | March 4, 1909 – March 4, 1913 | Republican | 1908 | James S. Sherman |
| 27 | Black-and-white photographic portrait of William Howard Taft | William Howard Taft (1857–1930) | March 4, 1909 – March 4, 1913 | Republican | 1908 | Vacant after October 30, 1912 |
| 28 | | Woodrow Wilson (1856–1924) | March 4, 1913 – March 4, 1921 | Democratic | 1912 | Thomas R. Marshall |
| 28 | | Woodrow Wilson (1856–1924) | March 4, 1913 – March 4, 1921 | Democratic | 1916 | Thomas R. Marshall |
| 29 | Black-and-white photographic portrait of Warren G. Harding | Warren G. Harding (1865–1923) | March 4, 1921 – August 2, 1923 | Republican | 1920 | Calvin Coolidge |
| 30 | Black-and-white photographic portrait of Calvin Coolidge | Calvin Coolidge (1872–1933) | August 2, 1923 (Note: Calvin Coolidge succeeded to the presidency upon the death of Warren G. Harding.) – March 4, 1929 | Republican | – | Vacant through March 4, 1925 |
| 30 | Black-and-white photographic portrait of Calvin Coolidge | Calvin Coolidge (1872–1933) | August 2, 1923 – March 4, 1929 | Republican | 1924 | Charles G. Dawes |
| 31 | Black-and-white photographic portrait of Herbert Hoover | Herbert Hoover (1874–1964) | March 4, 1929 – March 4, 1933 | Republican | 1928 | Charles Curtis |
| 32 | Photographic portrait of Franklin D. Roosevelt | Franklin D. Roosevelt (1882–1945) | March 4, 1933 – April 12, 1945 | Democratic | 1932 | John Nance Garner |
| 32 | Photographic portrait of Franklin D. Roosevelt | Franklin D. Roosevelt (1882–1945) | March 4, 1933 – April 12, 1945 | Democratic | 1936 | John Nance Garner |
| 32 | Photographic portrait of Franklin D. Roosevelt | Franklin D. Roosevelt (1882–1945) | March 4, 1933 – April 12, 1945 | Democratic | 1940 | Henry A. Wallace |
| 32 | Photographic portrait of Franklin D. Roosevelt | Franklin D. Roosevelt (1882–1945) | March 4, 1933 – April 12, 1945 | Democratic | 1944 | Harry S. Truman |
| 33 | Photographic portrait of Harry S. Truman | Harry S. Truman (1884–1972) | April 12, 1945 (Note: Harry S. Truman succeeded to the presidency upon the death of Franklin D. Roosevelt.) – January 20, 1953 | Democratic | – | Vacant through January 20, 1949 |
| 33 | Photographic portrait of Harry S. Truman | Harry S. Truman (1884–1972) | April 12, 1945 – January 20, 1953 | Democratic | 1948 | Alben W. Barkley |
| 34 | Photographic portrait of Dwight D. Eisenhower | Dwight D. Eisenhower (1890–1969) | January 20, 1953 – January 20, 1961 | Republican | 1952 | Richard Nixon |
| 34 | Photographic portrait of Dwight D. Eisenhower | Dwight D. Eisenhower (1890–1969) | January 20, 1953 – January 20, 1961 | Republican | 1956 | Richard Nixon |
| 35 | Photographic portrait of John F. Kennedy | John F. Kennedy (1917–1963) | January 20, 1961 – November 22, 1963 | Democratic | 1960 | Lyndon B. Johnson |
| 36 | Photographic portrait of Lyndon B. Johnson | Lyndon B. Johnson (1908–1973) | November 22, 1963 (Note: Lyndon B. Johnson succeeded to the presidency upon the death of John F. Kennedy.) – January 20, 1969 | Democratic | – | Vacant through January 20, 1965 |
| 36 | Photographic portrait of Lyndon B. Johnson | Lyndon B. Johnson (1908–1973) | November 22, 1963 – January 20, 1969 | Democratic | 1964 | Hubert Humphrey |
| 37 | Photographic portrait of Richard Nixon | Richard Nixon (1913–1994) | January 20, 1969 – August 9, 1974 | Republican | 1968 | Spiro Agnew |
| 37 | Photographic portrait of Richard Nixon | Richard Nixon (1913–1994) | January 20, 1969 – August 9, 1974 | Republican | 1972 | Spiro Agnew |
| 37 | Photographic portrait of Richard Nixon | Richard Nixon (1913–1994) | January 20, 1969 – August 9, 1974 | Republican | 1972 | Vacant: October 10 – December 6, 1973 |
| 37 | Photographic portrait of Richard Nixon | Richard Nixon (1913–1994) | January 20, 1969 – August 9, 1974 | Republican | 1972 | Gerald Ford (Note: Appointed as vice president under terms of the Twenty-fifth Amendment, Section 2) |
| 38 | Photographic portrait of Gerald Ford | Gerald Ford (1913–2006) | August 9, 1974 (Note: Gerald Ford succeeded to the presidency upon the resignation of Richard Nixon. Even though Ford served out the remainder of Nixon's second term, he was never elected to the presidency or vice presidency.) – January 20, 1977 | Republican | – | Vacant through December 19, 1974 |
| 38 | Photographic portrait of Gerald Ford | Gerald Ford (1913–2006) | August 9, 1974 – January 20, 1977 | Republican | – | Nelson Rockefeller |
| 39 | Photographic portrait of Jimmy Carter | Jimmy Carter (1924–2024) | January 20, 1977 – January 20, 1981 | Democratic | 1976 | Walter Mondale |
| 40 | Photographic portrait of Ronald Reagan | Ronald Reagan (1911–2004) | January 20, 1981 – January 20, 1989 | Republican | 1980 | George H. W. Bush |
| 40 | Photographic portrait of Ronald Reagan | Ronald Reagan (1911–2004) | January 20, 1981 – January 20, 1989 | Republican | 1984 | George H. W. Bush |
| 41 | Photographic portrait of George H. W. Bush | George H. W. Bush (1924–2018) | January 20, 1989 – January 20, 1993 | Republican | 1988 | Dan Quayle |
| 42 | Photographic portrait of Bill Clinton | Bill Clinton (b. 1946) | January 20, 1993 – January 20, 2001 | Democratic | 1992 | Al Gore |
| 42 | Photographic portrait of Bill Clinton | Bill Clinton (b. 1946) | January 20, 1993 – January 20, 2001 | Democratic | 1996 | Al Gore |
| 43 | Photographic portrait of George W. Bush | George W. Bush (b. 1946) | January 20, 2001 – January 20, 2009 | Republican | 2000 | Dick Cheney |
| 43 | Photographic portrait of George W. Bush | George W. Bush (b. 1946) | January 20, 2001 – January 20, 2009 | Republican | 2004 | Dick Cheney |
| 44 | Photographic portrait of Barack Obama | Barack Obama (b. 1961) | January 20, 2009 – January 20, 2017 | Democratic | 2008 | Joe Biden |
| 44 | Photographic portrait of Barack Obama | Barack Obama (b. 1961) | January 20, 2009 – January 20, 2017 | Democratic | 2012 | Joe Biden |
| 45 | Photographic portrait of Donald Trump | Donald Trump (b. 1946); 1st term | January 20, 2017 – January 20, 2021 | Republican | 2016 | Mike Pence |
| 46 | Photographic portrait of Joe Biden | Joe Biden (b. 1942) | January 20, 2021 – January 20, 2025 | Democratic | 2020 | Kamala Harris |
| 47 | Photographic portrait of Donald Trump | Donald Trump (b. 1946); 2nd term | January 20, 2025 – Incumbent | Republican | 2024 | JD Vance |

=== Timeline ===
Source: Whitehouse.gov

== See also ==
- Acting President of the United States
- Founding Fathers of the United States
- Historical rankings of presidents of the United States
- List of vice presidents of the United States
- President of the Continental Congress

== Works cited ==
General

- Guide to U.S. Elections. SAGE Publications. 2010. ISBN 978-1-60426-536-1.
- "Chronological List of Presidents, First Ladies, and Vice Presidents of the United States". Library of Congress.
- "Presidents". whitehouse.gov.

Expert studies

- Abbott, Philip (2005). "Accidental Presidents: Death, Assassination, Resignation, and Democratic Succession". Presidential Studies Quarterly. 35 (4). Wiley: 627–645. doi:10.1111/j.1741-5705.2005.00269.x. ISSN 0360-4918. JSTOR 27552721.
- Abbott, Philip (2013). "The First Bad President?: John Tyler". Bad Presidents. The Evolving American Presidency Series. Palgrave Macmillan. pp. 23–42. doi:10.1057/9781137306593_2. ISBN 978-1-349-45513-3.
- Cash, Jordan T. (2018). "The Isolated Presidency: John Tyler and Unilateral Presidential Power". American Political Thought. 7: 26–56. doi:10.1086/695644. ISSN 2161-1580. S2CID 158133180 – via ResearchGate.
- Dinnerstein, Leonard (1962). "The Accession of John Tyler to the Presidency". Virginia Magazine of History and Biography. 70 (4). Virginia Historical Society: 447–458. JSTOR 4246893.
- Epstein, Richard A. (2005). "Executive Power, the Commander in Chief, and the Militia Clause". Hofstra Law Review. 34 (2). ISSN 0091-4029.
- Goldman, Ralph Morris (1951). Party Chairmen and Party Faction, 1789–1900: A Theory of Executive Responsibility and Conflict Resolution. University of Chicago Press. OCLC 1243718246.
- Houpt, David W. (2010). "Securing a Legacy". The Virginia Magazine of History and Biography. Vol. 118, no. 1. Virginia Historical Society. ProQuest 195929787.
- Matuz, Roger (2001). Complete American Presidents Sourcebook. UXL. ISBN 978-0-7876-4842-8. LCCN 00056794. OL 24722725M.
- McHugh, Jane; Mackowiak, Philip A. (2014). "Death in the White House: President William Henry Harrison's Atypical Pneumonia". Clinical Infectious Diseases. 59 (7). Oxford University Press: 990–995. doi:10.1093/cid/ciu470. JSTOR 24032403. PMID 24962997.
- McSeveney, Samuel T. (1986). "Re-electing Lincoln: The Union Party Campaign and the Military Vote in Connecticut". Civil War History. 32 (2). Kent State University Press: 139–158. doi:10.1353/cwh.1986.0032. S2CID 144623179.
- Nardulli, Peter F., ed. (1992). The Constitution and American Political Development: An Institutional Perspective. University of Illinois Press. ISBN 978-0-252-01787-2.
- Neale, Thomas H. (2004). "Presidential and Vice Presidential Succession: Overview and Current Legislation" (PDF). Congressional Research Service.
- Peabody, Bruce G.; Gant, Scott E. (1999). "The Twice and Future President: Constitutional Interstices and the Twenty-Second Amendment". Minnesota Law Review. 83 (565). ISSN 0026-5535.
- Rossiter, Clinton (1962). "Powers of the United States President and Congress". Pakistan Horizon. 15 (2). Pakistan Institute of International Affairs: 85–92. JSTOR 41392704.
- Schaller, Thomas F.; Williams, Thomas W. (2003). "'The Contemporary Presidency': Postpresidential Influence in the Postmodern Era". Presidential Studies Quarterly. 33 (1). Center for Congressional and Presidential Studies: 188–200. JSTOR 27552468.
- Shugart, Matthew S. (2004). "Elections': The American Process of Selecting a President: A Comparative Perspective". Presidential Studies Quarterly. 34 (3). Center for Congressional and Presidential Studies: 632–655. doi:10.1111/j.1741-5705.2004.00216.x. JSTOR 27552617.
- Skau, George H. (1974). "Franklin D. Roosevelt and the Expansion of Presidential Power". Current History. 66 (394). University of California Press: 246–275. doi:10.1525/curh.1974.66.394.246. JSTOR 45313079. S2CID 248394036.

Presidential biographies

- Ambrose, Stephen E. (2000) [1999]. "Eisenhower, Dwight David". American National Biography. Oxford University Press. doi:10.1093/anb/9780198606697.article.0700094. ISBN 978-0-19-860669-7.
- Ambrosius, Lloyd E. (2000) [1999]. "Wilson, Woodrow". American National Biography. Oxford University Press. doi:10.1093/anb/9780198606697.article.0600726. ISBN 978-0-19-860669-7.
- Ammon, Harry (2000) [1999]. "Monroe, James". American National Biography. Oxford University Press. doi:10.1093/anb/9780198606697.article.0300338. ISBN 978-0-19-860669-7.
- Anbinder, Tyler (2000) [1999]. "Fillmore, Millard". American National Biography. Oxford University Press. doi:10.1093/anb/9780198606697.article.0400374. ISBN 978-0-19-860669-7.
- Banning, Lance (2000) [1999]. "Madison, James". American National Biography. Oxford University Press. doi:10.1093/anb/9780198606697.article.0300303. ISBN 978-0-19-860669-7.
- Brinkley, Alan (2000) [1999]. "Roosevelt, Franklin Delano". American National Biography. Oxford University Press. doi:10.1093/anb/9780198606697.article.0600567. ISBN 978-0-19-860669-7.
- Campbell, Ballard C. (2000) [1999]. "Cleveland, Grover". American National Biography. Oxford University Press. doi:10.1093/anb/9780198606697.article.0500144. ISBN 978-0-19-860669-7.
- Cole, Donald B. (2000) [1999]. "Van Buren, Martin". American National Biography. Oxford University Press. doi:10.1093/anb/9780198606697.article.0300507. ISBN 978-0-19-860669-7.
- Gara, Larry (2000) [1999]. "Pierce, Franklin". American National Biography. Oxford University Press. doi:10.1093/anb/9780198606697.article.0400788. ISBN 978-0-19-860669-7.
- Gardner, Lloyd (2000) [1999]. "Johnson, Lyndon Baines". American National Biography. Oxford University Press. doi:10.1093/anb/9780198606697.article.0700147. ISBN 978-0-19-860669-7.
- Gienapp, William E. (2000) [1999]. "Buchanan, James". American National Biography. Oxford University Press. doi:10.1093/anb/9780198606697.article.0400170. ISBN 978-0-19-860669-7.
- Gould, Lewis L. (2000) [1999]. "McKinley, William". American National Biography. Oxford University Press. doi:10.1093/anb/9780198606697.article.0500507. ISBN 978-0-19-860669-7.
- Gould, Lewis L. (2000) [1999]. "Taft, William Howard". American National Biography. Oxford University Press. doi:10.1093/anb/9780198606697.article.0600642. ISBN 978-0-19-860669-7.
- Greenberger, Scott S. (2017). The Unexpected President: The Life and Times of Chester A. Arthur. Da Capo Press. ISBN 978-0-306-82390-9.
- Greene, John Robert (2013). "Ford, Gerald R., Jr". American National Biography. Oxford University Press. doi:10.1093/anb/9780198606697.article.1501345. ISBN 978-0-19-860669-7.
- Gutzman, K. R. Constantine (2000) [1999]. "Harrison, William Henry". American National Biography. Oxford University Press. doi:10.1093/anb/9780198606697.article.0300211. ISBN 978-0-19-860669-7.
- Hamby, Alonzo L. (2000) [1999]. "Truman, Harry S." American National Biography. Oxford University Press. doi:10.1093/anb/9780198606697.article.0700307. ISBN 978-0-19-860669-7.
- Harbaugh, William H. (2000) [1999]. "Roosevelt, Theodore". American National Biography. Oxford University Press. doi:10.1093/anb/9780198606697.article.0600569. ISBN 978-0-19-860669-7.
- Hargreaves, Mary W. M. (2000) [1999]. "Adams, John Quincy". American National Biography. Oxford University Press. doi:10.1093/anb/9780198606697.article.0300002. ISBN 978-0-19-860669-7.
- Hawley, Ellis W. (2000) [1999]. "Harding, Warren Gamaliel". American National Biography. Oxford University Press. doi:10.1093/anb/9780198606697.article.0600253. ISBN 978-0-19-860669-7.
- Hoff, Joan (2000) [1999]. "Hoover, Herbert Clark". American National Biography. Oxford University Press. doi:10.1093/anb/9780198606697.article.0600287. ISBN 978-0-19-860669-7.
- Hoff, Joan (2000) [1999]. "Nixon, Richard Milhous". American National Biography. Oxford University Press. doi:10.1093/anb/9780198606697.article.0700684. ISBN 978-0-19-860669-7.
- Hoogenboom, Ari (2000) [1999]. "Hayes, Rutherford Birchard". American National Biography. Oxford University Press. doi:10.1093/anb/9780198606697.article.0500331. ISBN 978-0-19-860669-7.
- McCoy, Donald R. (2000) [1999]. "Coolidge, Calvin". American National Biography. Oxford University Press. doi:10.1093/anb/9780198606697.article.0600109. ISBN 978-0-19-860669-7.
- McDonald, Forrest (2000) [1999]. "Washington, George". American National Biography. Oxford University Press. doi:10.1093/anb/9780198606697.article.0200332. ISBN 978-0-19-860669-7.
- McPherson, James M. (2000) [1999]. "Grant, Ulysses S." American National Biography. Oxford University Press. doi:10.1093/anb/9780198606697.article.0500291. ISBN 978-0-19-860669-7.
- McPherson, James M. (2000) [1999]. "Lincoln, Abraham". American National Biography. Oxford University Press. doi:10.1093/anb/9780198606697.article.0400631. ISBN 978-0-19-860669-7.
- Parmet, Herbert S. (2000) [1999]. "Kennedy, John Fitzgerald". American National Biography. Oxford University Press. doi:10.1093/anb/9780198606697.article.0700152. ISBN 978-0-19-860669-7.
- Pencak, William (2000) [1999]. "Adams, John". American National Biography. Oxford University Press. doi:10.1093/anb/9780198606697.article.0100007. ISBN 978-0-19-860669-7.
- Peskin, Allan (2000) [1999]. "Garfield, James Abram". American National Biography. Oxford University Press. doi:10.1093/anb/9780198606697.article.0500264. ISBN 978-0-19-860669-7.
- Peterson, Merrill D. (2000). "Jefferson, Thomas". American National Biography. Oxford University Press. doi:10.1093/anb/9780198606697.article.0200196. ISBN 978-0-19-860669-7.
- Rawley, James A. (2000) [1999]. "Polk, James Knox". American National Biography. Oxford University Press. doi:10.1093/anb/9780198606697.article.0400795. ISBN 978-0-19-860669-7.
- Reeves, Thomas C. (2000) [1999]. "Arthur, Chester Alan". American National Biography. Oxford University Press. doi:10.1093/anb/9780198606697.article.0500033. ISBN 978-0-19-860669-7.
- Remini, Robert V. (2000) [1999]. "Jackson, Andrew". American National Biography. Oxford University Press. doi:10.1093/anb/9780198606697.article.0300238. ISBN 978-0-19-860669-7.
- Schaller, Michael (2004). "Reagan, Ronald Wilson". American National Biography. Oxford University Press. doi:10.1093/anb/9780198606697.article.0700791. ISBN 978-0-19-860669-7.
- Shade, William G. (2000) [1999]. "Tyler, John". American National Biography. Oxford University Press. doi:10.1093/anb/9780198606697.article.0401004. ISBN 978-0-19-860669-7.
- Smith, Elbert B. (2000) [1999]. "Taylor, Zachary". American National Biography. Oxford University Press. doi:10.1093/anb/9780198606697.article.0400978. ISBN 978-0-19-860669-7.
- Spetter, Allan Burton (2000) [1999]. "Harrison, Benjamin". American National Biography. Oxford University Press. doi:10.1093/anb/9780198606697.article.0500320. ISBN 978-0-19-860669-7.
- Trefousse, Hans L. (2000) [1999]. "Johnson, Andrew". American National Biography. Oxford University Press. doi:10.1093/anb/9780198606697.article.0400566. ISBN 978-0-19-860669-7.
- "James Carter". whitehouse.gov (NARA Archive).
- "George H. W. Bush". whitehouse.gov (NARA Archive).
- "William J. Clinton". whitehouse.gov (NARA Archive).
- "George W. Bush". whitehouse.gov (NARA Archive).
- "Barack Obama". whitehouse.gov (NARA Archive).
- "Donald Trump". whitehouse.gov (NARA Archive).
- "Joe Biden". whitehouse.gov (NARA Archive).

Online sources

- Jamison, Dennis (December 31, 2014). "George Washington's Views on Political Parties in America". The Washington Times.
- "Creating the United States: Formation of Political Parties". Library of Congress.
- "President's Swearing-in Ceremony". United States Senate.
- Freile, Victoria E. (November 6, 2024). "When does Trump take office? What to know about Inauguration Day 2025". Democrat and Chronicle.
- Hajela, Deepti (November 6, 2024). "Trump isn't first to be second: Grover Cleveland set precedent of non-consecutive presidential terms". Associated Press.
- "Live election updates: Donald Trump wins US presidency". Associated Press. November 15, 2024.
