= Wimmer =

Wimmer is a German surname. Notable people with the surname include:

- Andreas Wimmer, Swiss sociologist, Lieber Professor of Sociology and Political Philosophy at Columbia University
- Bill Wimmer, American railroad executive who worked in operations for the Union Pacific Railroad
- Boniface Wimmer (1809–1887), German monk who founded the first Benedictine monastery in the United States
- Brian Wimmer (born 1959), American actor
- Carina Wimmer (born 1995), German pistol sport shooter
- Carl Wimmer (born 1975), former member of the Utah House of Representatives
- Carolus Wimmer (born 1948), German-Venezuelan communist politician and university professor
- Chris Wimmer (born 1979), American professional stock car racing driver
- Chris Wimmer (baseball) (born 1970), American professional baseball player and scout
- Christian Friedrich Heinrich Wimmer (1803–1868), German botanist and educator from Breslau
- Dick Wimmer (1936–2011), American novelist
- Eckard Wimmer (born 1936), American scientist and a Distinguished Professor of Stony Brook University
- Eduard Josef Wimmer-Wisgrill (1882–1961), Austrian industrial designer, architect and fashion designer
- Franz Wimmer (born 1932), Austrian cyclist
- Friedrich Wimmer (soldier) (1912–1986), highly decorated Oberfeldwebel in the Wehrmacht during World War II
- Gary Wimmer (born 1961), former American football linebacker
- Gerd Wimmer (born 1977), retired Austrian football player
- Gerhard Wimmer (born 1953), Austrian former professional tennis player
- Hans Wimmer (1907–2025), German sculptor
- Hans Wimmer (luger) (born 1947), German luger
- Helmut Wimmer (1925–2006), painter and staff artist for New York's Hayden Planetarium from 1954 to 1987
- Herbert Wimmer (born 1944), former football player
- Joseph Wimmer (born 1934), member of the Wisconsin State Assembly
- Julie Wimmer (born 1975), designer in the field of jewelry and glass
- Kevin Wimmer (born 1992), Austrian footballer
- Kim Wimmer (born 1970), American actress, singer, educator, Miss Alabama 1992
- Kurt Wimmer (born 1964), American screenwriter and film director
- Larry T. Wimmer (born 1935), the Warren and Wilson Dusenberry University Professor at Brigham Young University
- Ludvig Wimmer (1839–1920), Danish linguist and runologist
- Manfred Wimmer (1944–1995), the first Western professional Go player
- Mario Wimmer, cultural historian and theorist of history
- Martin Wimmer (born 1957), former Grand Prix motorcycle road racer from Germany
- Michael Wimmer (born 1980), German football coach and manager
- Natasha Wimmer (born 1973), American translator
- Nicolas Wimmer (born 1995), Austrian professional footballer
- Patrick Wimmer (born 2001), Austrian professional footballer
- Per Wimmer (born 1968), Danish space advocate and a future space traveller
- Petra Wimmer (born 1965), Austrian politician
- Rainer Wimmer (1955–2025), Austrian politician
- Scott Wimmer (born 1976), NASCAR Nationwide Series driver from Wisconsin
- Sebastian Wimmer (born 1994), Austrian footballer
- Thomas Wimmer (musician), Austrian viola-da-gamba player, conductor of Accentus Austria
- Thomas Wimmer (politician) (1887–1964), Bavarian SPD politician
- Willy Wimmer (born 1943), German politician

== See also ==
- Wimmer's shrew (Crocidura wimmeri) is a white-toothed shrew found only in Côte d'Ivoire
- Wimmer Fountain (Czech: Wimmerova kašna), an outdoor fountain and sculpture in Prague, Czech Republic
- Danny Wimmer Presents (DWP), a music festival company headquartered in Los Angeles, California
- Louise Wimmer, 2011 French drama film directed by Cyril Mennegun
