= Susan Monica =

American convicted murderer (born 1948)

- Born: July 8, 1948 (age 78); California, U.S.
- Convictions: Murder; Abuse of corpse; Fraud
- Penalty: 50 years imprisonment

Details
- Victims: 2
- Span of crimes: 2012 – September 2013
- Country: United States
- State: Oregon
- Imprisoned at: Coffee Creek Correctional Facility

Susan Monica (born July 8, 1948) is an American former sailor and convicted murderer. She garnered public attention after being convicted of murdering two men at her residence in rural Wimer, Oregon. Both of the victims had worked as handymen on her farm, and each had gone missing under mysterious circumstances in 2012 and 2013, respectively. In both cases, Monica dismembered the victims before feeding portions of their remains to her farm pigs. Partial remains of the two men were discovered at her residence after authorities interrogated her for identity theft of one of the men.

In April 2015, after a trial that lasted six days, Monica was sentenced to two consecutive 25-year sentences, for a total of 50 years to serve in prison for her crimes.

== Background ==
Monica was born in California in 1948. After serving in the United States Navy during the Vietnam War Monica began an engineering career and, in 1991, purchased a 20-acre farm in rural Wimer, Oregon. She ran the business White Queen Construction.

Monica employed 59-year-old Stephen Delecino as a handyman on the farm. Delecino disappeared some time in 2012 under mysterious circumstances. Robert Haney, a 56-year-old handyman, then disappeared in September 2013.

== Investigation ==
Authorities arrived at Monica's residence on January 10, 2014, after it was discovered she had been using Haney's food stamps card, and confronted her with fraud charges. Upon searching her residence, they discovered evidence of human remains, which prompted a full search of the property.

Portions of remains from a total of two individuals were discovered; the first belonged to 56-year-old Robert Haney, Monica's handyman, who had gone missing in September 2013. The second individual initially was unidentified, but was later determined to be Delecino, a former employee of Monica's who had gone missing in 2012. The state of Monica's property was squalid, with significant piles of garbage, animal bones, and no running water or sewage system.

Investigators spent three weeks searching Monica's 20-acre (8.1 ha) farm near Rogue River, digging over 50 holes in the land searching for additional evidence and other potential victims. No additional remains were uncovered in their search. The pigs Monica kept on the farm were subsequently euthanized, and a former resident claimed he had witnessed Monica feed deceased house pets and livestock to the pigs on different occasions.

Upon interviewing Monica, detectives found she gave varying explanations as to how both men died, claiming both that Delecino had shot himself repeatedly in the head in 2012, and that she had also shot him in self-defense, after which her pigs began to eat portions of his body. Monica claimed to have buried the remnants of his corpse after finding the pigs consuming him.

In regard to Haney, Monica claimed he had disappeared from the farm in the summer of 2013. She stated she later came upon him as her pigs were disemboweling him, and that she shot him to death to ease his suffering. Monica subsequently expressed uncertainty over whether Haney was dead when she shot him. Some of Haney's remains were found in plastic bags in Monica's barn.

During her video-taped interrogation, which was later used in the trial, Monica stated: "I do not value human life very much. The only thing wrong with this planet is there's people on it. If it weren't for us, all the other animals, dodo birds and whatever else, would still be here".

== Trial and conviction ==
Monica pleaded not guilty to two counts of murder, abuse of a corpse, and identity theft. Monica, despite having representation, chose to cross-examine Eric Henderson, the case's lead investigator. During the trial, an Oregon State Police anthropologist testified that Haney's legs had been dismembered with an axe, and that his thigh bones showed signs of "being gnawed on by an animal". The anthropologist stated it was unclear whether Haney had been dead prior to dismemberment of his legs. It was also stated by the anthropologist that Delecino had suffered three to four gunshot wounds to the head. Another witness who had been in jail with Monica testified that she had received a birthday card from her signed "from the sweetest murderer in Jackson County".

On April 21, 2015, Monica was convicted on all counts after six days of testimony and only one hour of jury deliberations. She is currently serving 50 years in prison.
