= Coffee Creek Correctional Facility =

Women's prison in Wilsonville, Oregon, US

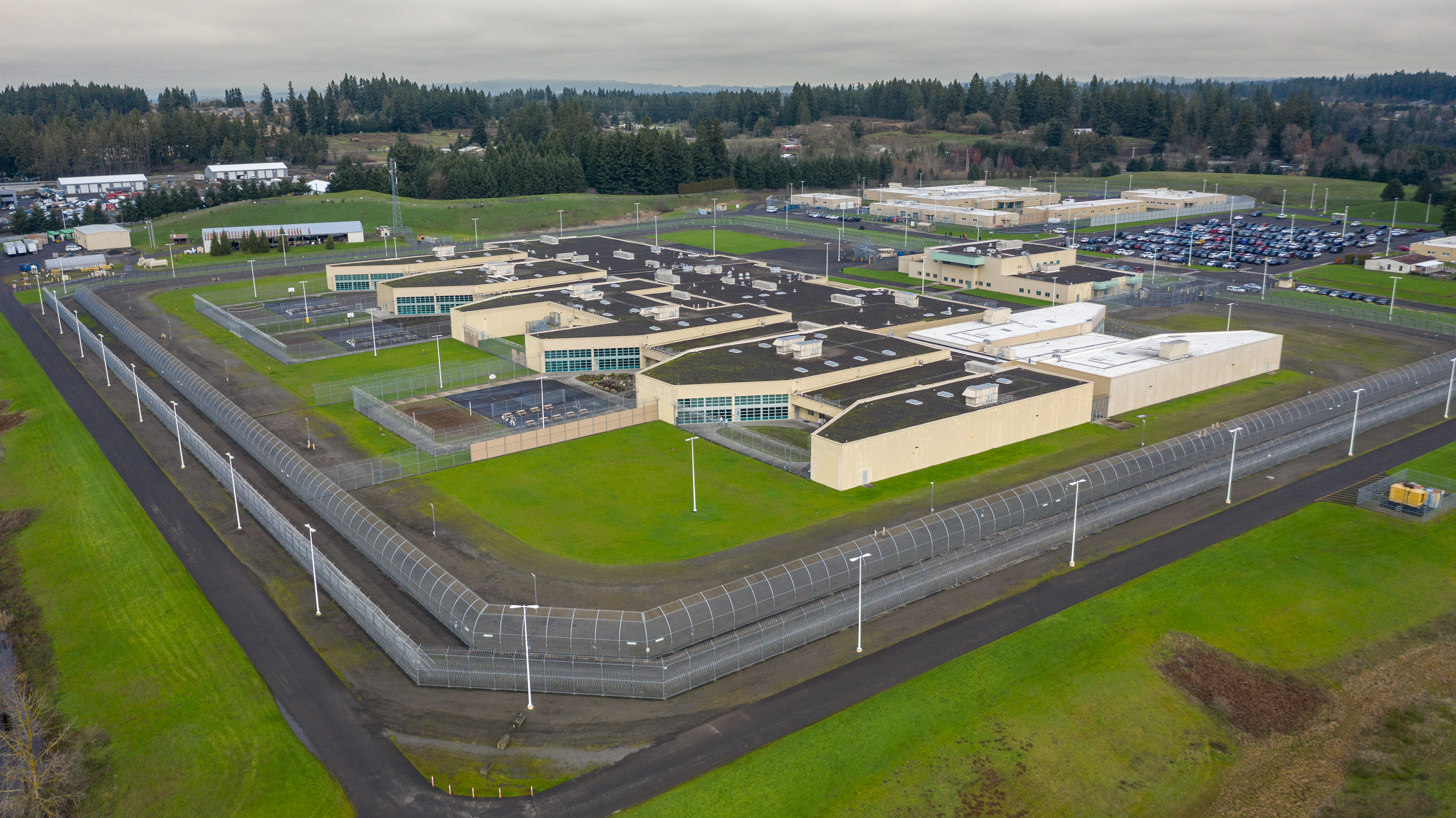
- Interactive map of Coffee Creek Correctional Facility
- Location: Wilsonville, Oregon, United States 45°20′29″N 122°47′23″W
- Status: Operational
- Security class: Minimum and medium security
- Capacity: 1,685
- Opened: 2001
- Managed by: Oregon Department of Corrections
- Warden: Nichole Brown
- Website: https://www.oregon.gov/doc/about/Pages/prison-locations.aspx

Coffee Creek Correctional Facility is a women's prison and prisoner intake center in Wilsonville, Oregon, United States. Operated by the Oregon Department of Corrections, the 1,684-bed facility opened in 2001 at a 108-acre (0.44 km^{2}) campus. The selection of the location for the prison was controversial and included legal challenges. The minimum and medium security facility operates several programs designed to teach skills to inmates. Coffee Creek is the only women's prison in Oregon.

Female state death row inmates in Oregon are designated to be held in this facility.

In May 2025, for offenses committed on duty as Supervisor of the Special Housing Unit, former Coffee Creek corrections officer Levi David Gray plead guilty to two counts of custodial sexual misconduct in the first degree and subsequently received the maximum sentence of 20 months in prison.

== History ==
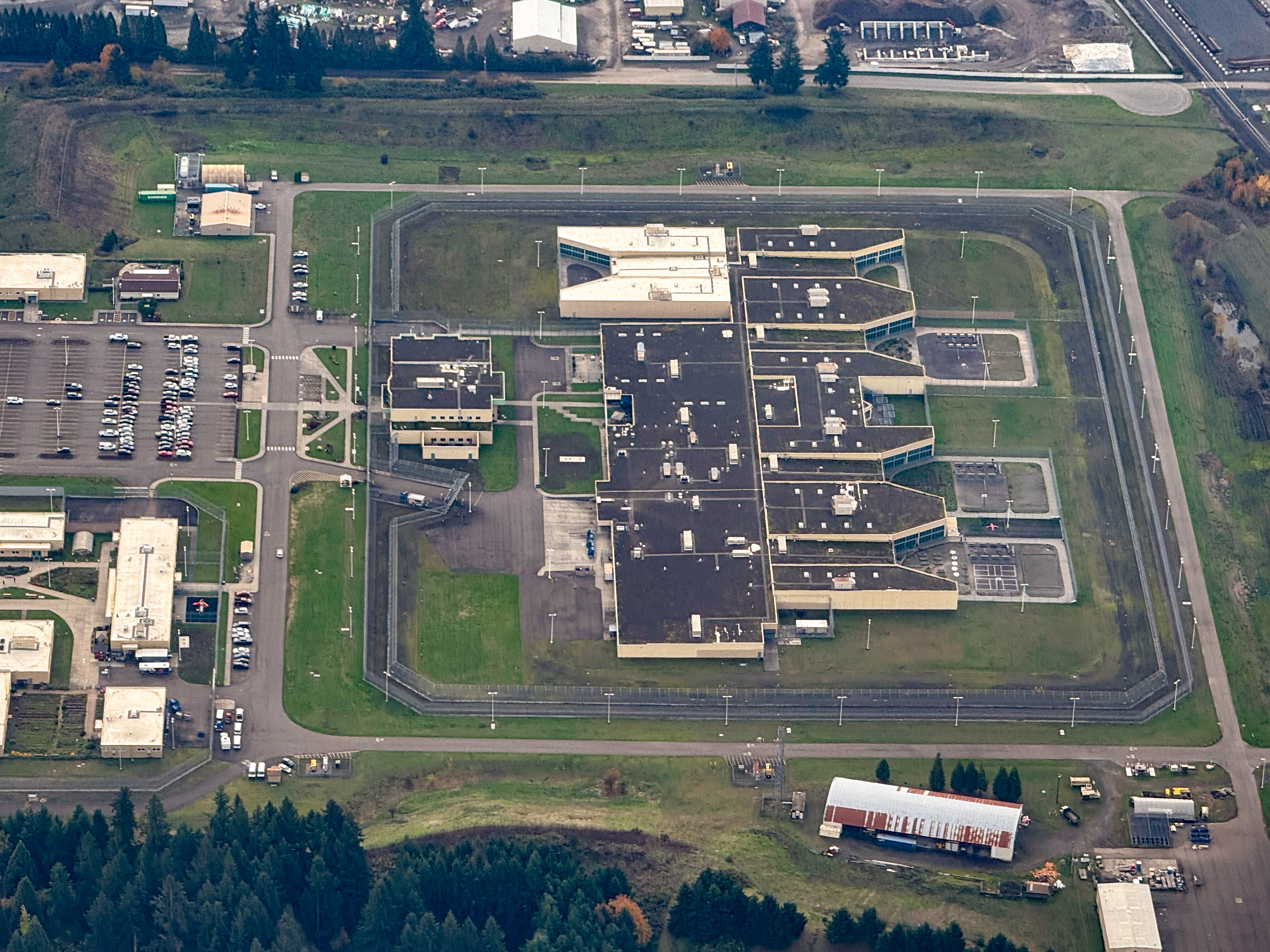
Aerial photo of the facility

Oregon needed to build a new women's prison and prisoner intake facility due to the increased demand for prison space created with the passage of Ballot Measure 11 in 1994 that imposed mandatory minimum sentences for certain crimes. The new prison was also designed to replace the 200-bed Oregon Women's Correctional Center in Salem. Originally, the plan called for building the prison in Salem, but lawmakers and politicians there successfully pushed to build it elsewhere. State officials planned on building the prison at the site of the closed Dammasch State Hospital in Wilsonville, but later selected a 108-acre (0.44 km^{2}) site at the north end of Wilsonville in Washington County. The process involved protracted battles over two legislative sessions and was settled when Oregon Governor John Kitzhaber signed a bill into law.

Groundbreaking on the complex was held on April 21, 2000. A final challenge to the location was rejected by the Oregon Supreme Court in September 2000. The former site selected at the former state hospital became the Villebois housing development. In October 2001, Coffee Creek's minimum security wing opened, followed by the medium security wing and inmate intake center in April 2002 at the $171 million complex. Delayed by three years due to the siting issue, the prison was officially dedicated in April 2002.

The construction project was an honorable mention in 2002 as the top public project in Oregon by Northwest Construction magazine. DLR Group designed the prison, and Hoffman Construction Company built the facility. Within a year of opening, the inmate population reached 1,015.

In August 2003, Coffee Creek had to install portable bathrooms for a day after mechanical problems prevented bathrooms from functioning properly. From 2004 to 2006, several corrections officers were removed after accusations of sexual misconduct, with one victim reaching a settlement of $350,000 with the state. In 2006, an additional 108 beds were added to the prison, with plans to add about 200 more by the year 2011. Nancy Howton was named the superintendent of Coffee Creek in November 2007.

== Sexual abuse of inmates by corrections officer ==
In May 2023, a former corrections officer Levi David Gray took a then 19-year-old female victim to her cell and sexually abused her where there was no camera. Gray was sentenced to 20 months in prison on convictions of two counts of "custodial sexual misconduct in the first degree." This corrections officer faces various other allegations and civil lawsuits for alleged sexual abuse of inmates that occurred between 2017 and 2023.

== Facilities ==
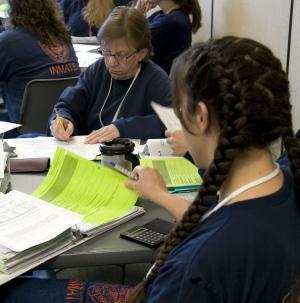
Inmates participating in the Lifelong Information For Entrepreneurs program

Built at a cost of $110 million, the 425,000-square-foot (39,500 m^{2}), 1,684-bed prison sits on 108 acres (44 ha). Coffee Creek's prisoner intake facility processes approximately 450 inmates per month. Incoming prisoners are screened and ranked based on factors such as behavior, age, health, criminal history, and psychological health while housed in the 432-bed intake center.

Despite being a women's prison, the complex houses prisoners of both sexes. Coffee Creek is Oregon's only women's prison, and was originally built with 820 beds for female inmates. The intake process takes 30 days before male prisoners are assigned to other prisons in the state's system. Coffee Creek contains both minimum security and medium security units. Other units are used for intensive management, drug and alcohol rehabilitation, psychiatric treatment, medical treatment, and disciplinary segregation (solitary confinement). A total of 450 officers are assigned to Coffee Creek.

Since the complex opened, the Oregon Department of Corrections has operated the Parenting Inside Out program designed to teach parenting skills to mothers behind bars. With nearly two-thirds of inmates also mothers, Coffee Creek runs several other programs focused on mothers and the children of inmates.

One job program at the prison trains prisoners to refurbish reading glasses donated to the Lions Club, which are then given away in Mexico. The Oregon Department of Transportation through its DMV division operates a call center inside the prison. The Coffee Creek Quilters is an inmate program that teaches quilting. They also have a garden used by inmates to raise crops.

== Notable inmates ==
Notable inmates held at the facility include:

- Susan Monica – trans woman convicted of the murder of two men at her residence in rural Wimer, Oregon.
- Tucker Reed – feminist author and activist convicted of the manslaughter of her uncle.
