= Malign Neglect =

- Author: Michael Tonry
- Language: English
- Subject: Race in the United States criminal justice system
- Publisher: Oxford University Press
- Publication date: 1995
- Pages: 233
- ISBN: 0195104692

Malign Neglect: Race, Crime, and Punishment in America is a book about race in the United States criminal justice system by Michael Tonry, a criminologist at the University of Minnesota. It was published in 1995 by Oxford University Press. In it, Tonry criticizes "tough-on-crime" policies in the United States, arguing that they have had disproportionately negative effects on the education and employment prospects of African-American men.

== Reviews ==
In a favorable review, Bethune-Cookman College professor Evelyn Gilbert wrote that Malign Neglect "...persuasively illustrates how the phrase "inner-city racial minorities" has become the generic label for crime and criminals in the waning decades of 20th-century America." In a less favorable review and analysis of the book, Washington College of Law professor Angela J. Davis criticized Tonry for "...his failure to acknowledge the effects of discriminatory prosecutorial practices and sentencing laws."

== Impact ==
Malign Neglect is credited with inspiring Andrew Sonner's drug-enforcement policy as sheriff of Montgomery County, Maryland, which emphasized police going after dealers and offering treatment to low-level users.
