= Dammasch State Hospital =

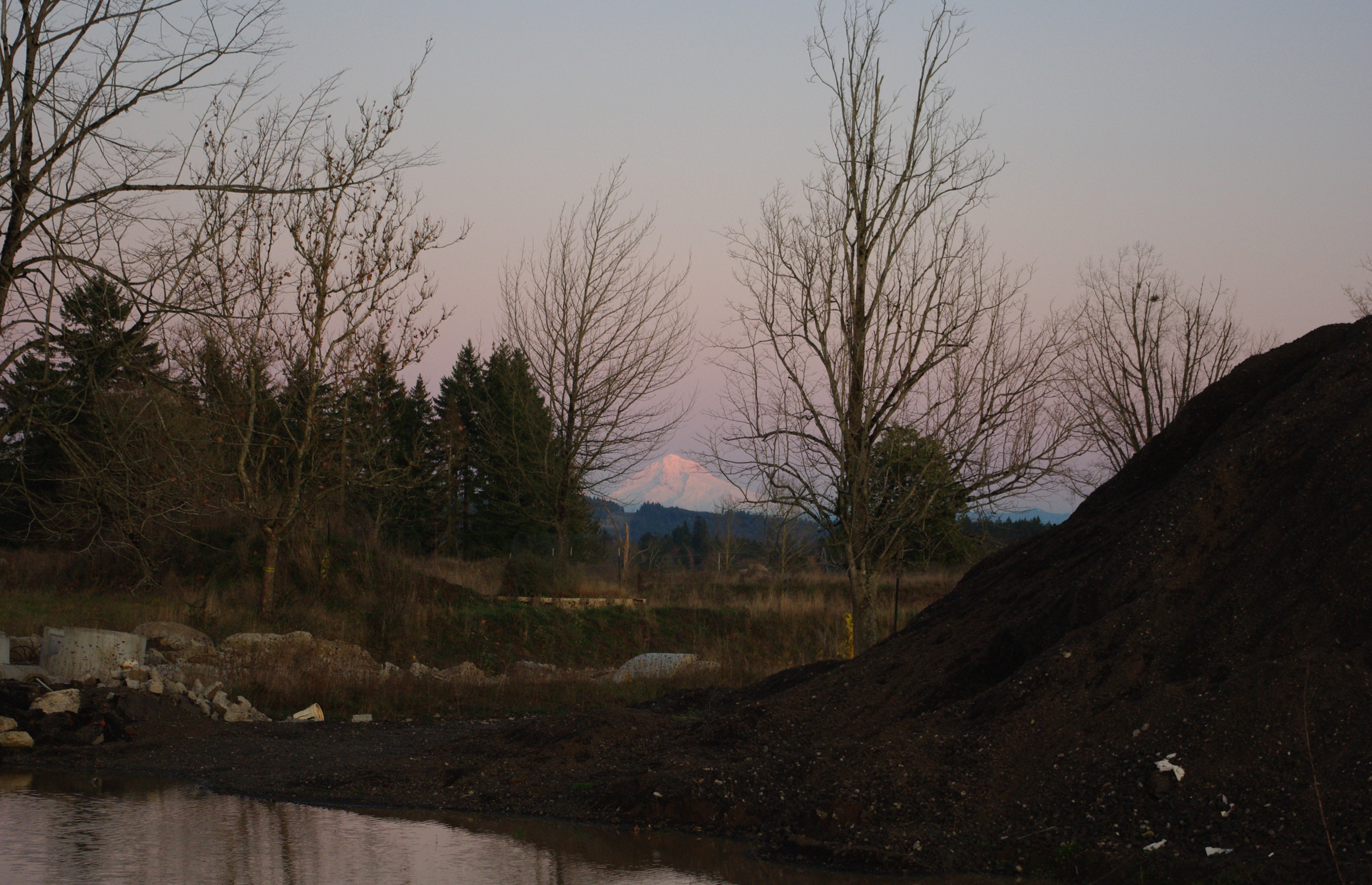
- Site in 2009

Geography
- Location: Wilsonville, Clackamas County, Oregon, United States
- Coordinates: 45.3121°N 122.7943°W

Organization
- Type: Psychiatric hospital

History
- Founded: 1961
- Closed: 1995

Links
- Lists: Hospitals in Oregon

Dammasch State Hospital was a mental hospital, asylum, and educational center located in Wilsonville, Oregon, United States. Named for Dr. Ferdinand H. Dammasch, the hospital opened in 1961 and closed in 1995. After its closure, the former site was embroiled in local controversy as it was a proposed location for a women's prison, which angered local residents as the site is less than a mile from residential neighborhoods. The Dammasch building was demolished, and the Villebois housing development occupies its former site.

== See also ==
- Callahan Center (later Living Enrichment Center) was contiguous to the hospital site and part of the larger development planning area.
