= Rens Bod =

Dutch humanities researcher (born 1965)

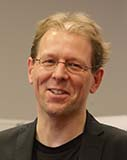
- Born: 1965 (age 60–61); Bergh, Netherlands

Academic background
- Education: Utrecht University; Sapienza University of Rome; University of Amsterdam
- Thesis: (1995)

Academic work
- Discipline: Digital Humanities, history of Humanities and Knowledge
- Institutions: University of St Andrews; University of Amsterdam

Rens Bod (born 1965, Bergh) is a professor in digital humanities and history of humanities at the University of Amsterdam. His research focuses on the exploration of patterns and underlying principles in language, music, art, literature and history.

He also investigates the history of pattern searching in the humanities from a supranational perspective, thereby giving an impulse to the new field of "history of the humanities". In addition, Bod explores the history of the human search for meaning and purpose, and the underlying patterns and principles therein. He also used this approach to uncover the underlying patterns and principles in the gradual distinctions between humans and other animals.

== Education and research ==
Rens Bod studied physics and astronomy at Utrecht University followed by Letters at the Sapienza University of Rome. In 1995 he obtained a PhD in computational linguistics at the University of Amsterdam. In 2005, he became full professor in Computer Science at the University of St Andrews, after which he was appointed full professor at the University of Amsterdam. He was guest professor in Manchester, Roskilde and Bologna. In 2021 he held the International Francqui chair at Ghent University. In 2023 Bod was elected member of the Royal Netherlands Academy of Arts and Sciences.

== History of humanities and history of knowledge ==
In 2010 Bod published the first global history of the humanities, focussing on the search for patterns and principles in the various humanities disciplines from antiquity to the present. The book showed how the empirical method started in the study of art, music, language and texts, and how it was transferred from the humanities to the sciences. The book was translated into seven languages, and its English translation, A New History of the Humanities, was referred to by the Times Literary Supplement as "an extraordinarily ambitious undertaking […] the first ever history of its kind". Bod showed that an interconnected history of the humanities was possible, creating the basis for a new field. In 2022, Bod extended his research towards an overarching history of knowledge disciplines resulting in the open access book World of Patterns: A Global History of Knowledge. In this book, Bod steps back to the Stone Age to answer the question: Where did our knowledge of the world today begin and how did it develop? Drawing on developments from all continents of the inhabited world, the book examines to what degree the progressions of our knowledge can be considered interwoven and to what degree we can speak of global trends. Bod is one of the founders of the journal History of Humanities, and he serves as the president of the Society for the History of the Humanities.

== Activism ==
In 2017 Bod founded WOinActie, a movement of academics and students that opposes the continuing budget cuts at Dutch Universities. Together with Remco Breuker and Ingrid Robeyns he published the book 40 Stellingen over de Wetenschap ("40 theses on science and humanities") in which they propose to change current universities into institutions that are crucial for a democratic and future-oriented society.

== Selected publications ==
- Het unieke dier. Op zoek naar het specifiek menselijke, Prometheus, 2025.
- Waarom ben ik hier? Een kleine wereldgeschiedenis van zingeving, Prometheus, 2023.
- World of Patterns: A Global History of Knowledge, Johns Hopkins University Press, 2022. (Open Access via Project MUSE)
- The Humanities in the World, Upress, 2020, with Stefan Collini, Onora O’Neill and Anders Engberg-Pedersen.
- 40 stellingen over de wetenschap, Boom uitgevers, 2020, with Remco Breuker and Ingrid Robeyns.
- “A New Field: History of Humanities”, with Julia Kursell, Jaap Maat and Thijs Weststeijn, History of Humanities 1(1), 2016, pp. 1–8.
- "A Comparative Framework for Studying the Histories of the Humanities and Science", Isis 106(2), 2015, pp. 367–377.
- The Making of the Humanities III: The Modern Humanities, Amsterdam University Press, 2014, with Jaap Maat and Thijs Weststeijn.
- A New History of the Humanities: The Search for Patterns and Principles from Antiquity to the Present, Oxford University Press, 2013.
- The Making of the Humanities II: From Early Modern to Modern Disciplines, Amsterdam University Press, 2012, with Jaap Maat and Thijs Weststeijn.
- "In search of universal properties of musical scales", Journal of New Music Research 40(1), 2011, pp. 81–89, met Aline Honingh.
- De vergeten wetenschappen: Een geschiedenis van de humaniora, Prometheus, 2010.
- The Making of the Humanities I: Early Modern Europe, Amsterdam University Press, 2010, with Jaap Maat and Thijs Weststeijn.
- "From exemplar to grammar: A probabilistic analogy‐based model of language learning", Cognitive Science 33(5), 2009, pp. 752–793.
- Probabilistic Linguistics, The MIT Press, 2003, with Jennifer Hay and Stefanie Jannedy.
- Data-Oriented Parsing, CSLI Publications, University of Chicago Press, 2003, with Remko Scha and Khalil Sima’an.
- "A unified model of structural organization in language and music", Journal of Artificial Intelligence Research 17, 2002, pp. 289–308.
- Beyond Grammar: An Experience-Based Theory of Language, CSLI Publications, 1998.
