= Laura J. Snyder =

American historian, philosopher, and writer

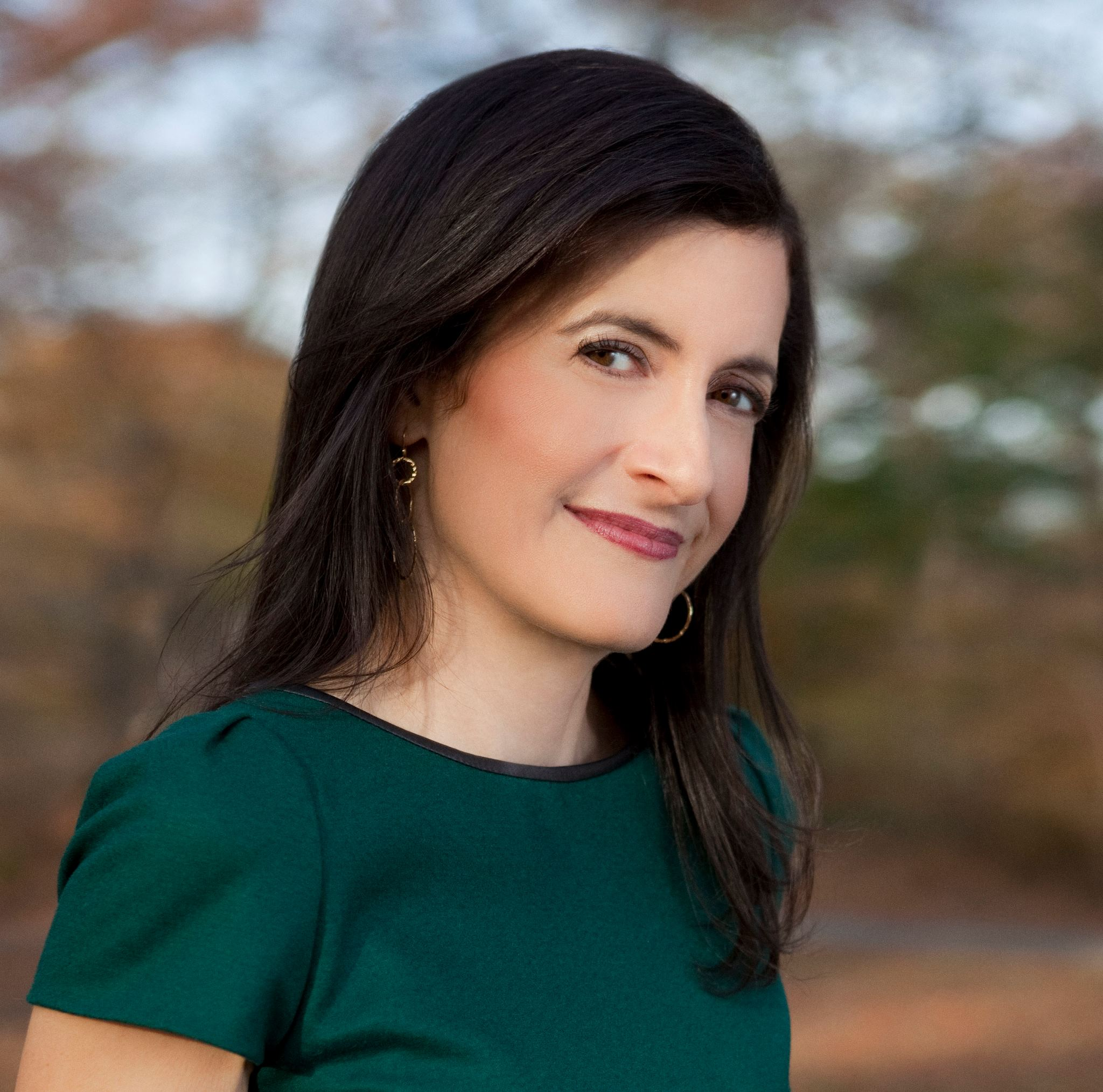
- Born: November 1964 (age 61); New York City, New York, U.S.
- Education: Brandeis University; Johns Hopkins University
- Occupation: Writer
- Writing career
- Notable awards: · Fulbright Scholarship · Mellon Fellowship · Phi Beta Kappa · Life Member, Clare Hall, Cambridge University · Leon Levy/Alfred P. Sloan Fellow, CUNY · NEH Public Scholars Grant
- Website: www.laurajsnyder.com

Laura J. Snyder (born 1964) is an American historian, philosopher, and writer. She is a Fulbright Scholar, a Life Member of Clare Hall, Cambridge, was the first Leon Levy/Alfred P. Sloan fellow at The Leon Levy Center for Biography at The Graduate Center, CUNY, and is the recipient of an NEH Public Scholars grant. She writes narrative-driven non-fiction books including, most recently, Eye of the Beholder: Johannes Vermeer, Antoni van Leeuwenhoek, and the Reinvention of Seeing, which won the Society for the History of Technology's 2016 Sally Hacker Prize. In 2019, Snyder signed a contract with A. A. Knopf to author a biography of Oliver Sacks, based on exclusive access to the Sacks archive. Snyder also writes for The Wall Street Journal. She lives in New York City, where she was a philosophy professor at St. John's University for twenty-one years.

== Biography ==
Snyder was born in New York City and grew up on Long Island, New York. She attended Syosset High School. In 1987, she received BA degrees from Brandeis University in philosophy and in the history of western thought. She received her PhD in philosophy from Johns Hopkins University in 1996. At Johns Hopkins she also completed a certificate program in the History and Philosophy of Science.

Snyder became a Phi Beta Kappa member in 1987, received a Mellon Fellowship in 1997–98, was awarded a Fulbright Scholarship in 1998–99, and received a fellowship from the American Philosophical Society in 2004–05. She was elected a Life Member of Clare Hall, Cambridge University, in 1999. She joined the faculty of St. John's University in New York City in 1996, was promoted to full professor in 2012, and retired in 2017.

Snyder has published numerous articles in scholarly journals including Studies in History and Philosophy of Science, Philosophy of Science, and Perspectives on Science and in several edited volumes on the history and philosophy of science. Snyder was a steering committee member of the International Society for the History of Philosophy of Science (HOPOS) from 2003 to 2012 and its president in 2009 and 2010. She was a founding co-editor of the Society's journal HOPOS.

Snyder lives in New York City.

== Publications and appearances ==
Snyder's most recent book, Eye of the Beholder: Johannes Vermeer, Antoni van Leeuwenhoek, and the Reinvention of Seeing (2015) describes how artists and scientists in Holland in the 1600s changed the way we see the world. Snyder tells this story through the lens of the lives of two men who were born the same week in the small town of Delft: Johannes Vermeer and Antoni van Leeuwenhoek. It is published by W. W. Norton in North American and in the U.K. and Commonwealth by Head of Zeus. The book won the Society for the History of Technology's 2016 Sally Hacker Prize. (Prior winners include Rebecca Solnit and Eric Schlosser.) It was named one of the best art books of 2015 by Christie's and Best Reads of 2015 by New Scientist.

Snyder's The Philosophical Breakfast Club: Four Remarkable Friends who Transformed Science and Changed the World (2011), an interleaved biography of Charles Babbage, John F.W. Herschel, William Whewell, and Richard Jones, was reviewed in The Wall Street Journal, The Washington Post, The Economist, and other popular media outlets and science magazines. The book was named an "Outstanding Title" by the American Library Association, a "Notable Book" by Scientific American, an "Official Selection" of the TED Book Club, and winner of the 2011 Royal Institution of Australia's Poll for Favorite Science Book. It has been translated into Spanish, Italian, and Chinese.

Snyder's first book, Reforming Philosophy: A Victorian Debate on Science and Society, was published by the University of Chicago Press in 2006.

Snyder was a speaker at TED Global in 2012 and gave the 2011 Dibner Library Lecture at the Smithsonian Institution. She has appeared on radio shows and podcasts in the US, Canada, and U.K. She contributes book reviews and essays to the Wall Street Journal. Her writings have also appeared in Stanford Encyclopedia of Philosophy, Slate, Harvard Magazine, and Science Magazine.

== Partial list of publications and appearances ==
- Snyder, Laura J. (2015). Eye of the Beholder: Johannes Vermeer, Antoni van Leeuwenhoek, and the Reinvention of Seeing. W. W. Norton. ISBN 978-0393077469.
- Snyder, Laura J. (2011). The Philosophical Breakfast Club: Four Remarkable Friends who Transformed Science and Changed the World. Broadway Books. ISBN 9780767930482.
- Snyder, Laura J. (2006). Reforming Philosophy: A Victorian Debate on Science and Society. University of Chicago Press. ISBN 978-0226767338.
- Snyder, Laura J. (November 12, 2019). "Lawrence Weschler on Oliver Sacks: In conversation with Laura J. Snyder and Kai Bird". CUNY GC Presents (Interview).
- Snyder, Laura J. (October 20, 2016). Eye of the Beholder/. Carnegie Museum of Art.
- Snyder, Laura J. (May 4, 2015). "One to One - Laura J. Snyder - CUNY TV". One to One (Interview). Interviewed by Sheryl McCarthy.
- Snyder, Laura J. (March 16, 2015). "The Painter and the Philosopher Who Taught Us How to See". The Leonard Lopate Show (Interview). Interviewed by Leonard Lopate.
- Snyder, Laura J. (February 21, 2014). "The Philosophical Breakfast Club #253". Science for the People (Interview). Interviewed by Desiree Schell.
- TED Global 2012, Edinburgh, June, 2012.
- Dibner Library Lecture, Smithsonian Institution, December 6, 2011.
