= Evans Creek (Rogue River tributary) =

Tributary in US

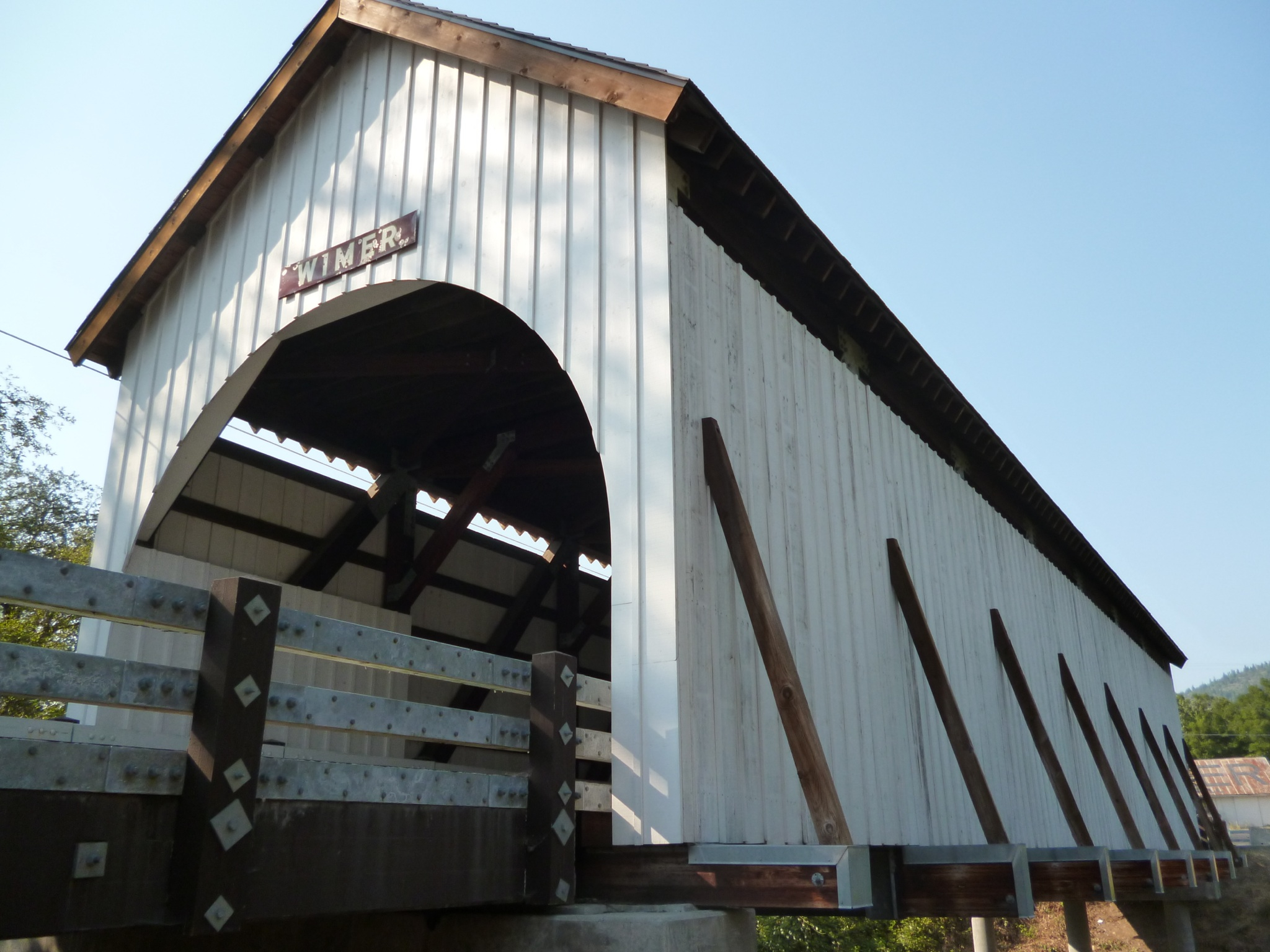
- Wimer Bridge crosses the creek in Wimer

- Location of the mouth of Evans Creek in Oregon

Location
- Country: United States
- State: Oregon
- County: Jackson

Physical characteristics
- Source
  - coordinates: 42°45′04″N 122°56′27″W
- Mouth: Rogue River
  - location: Rogue River
  - coordinates: 42°25′57″N 123°10′36″W
  - elevation: 991 ft (302 m)
- Length: 38 mi (61 km)
- Basin size: 224 sq mi (580 km^{2})

Evans Creek is a tributary, about 35 miles (56 km) long, of the Rogue River in the U.S. state of Oregon. It begins near Richter Mountain in the Cascade Range and flows generally south to The Meadows then southwest to Wimer then south to the city of Rogue River, all in Jackson County. The creek enters the river about 111 miles (179 km) from the Rogue's mouth on the Pacific Ocean. Wimer Bridge, a one-lane covered bridge crosses the creek at Wimer.

Named tributaries from source to mouth are Railroad Gap, Wolf, Coal, Chapman, Canon, and Morrison creeks. Further downstream come Spignet, West Fork Evans, May, Sykes, and Pleasant creeks. Last are Bear Branch and Fielder Creek.

Pleasant Creek was named after Pleasant M. Armstrong, a pioneer who was killed near its course.

Formerly listed among the 10 worst dams in the state for migratory fish passage, two abandoned dams on Evans Creek were demolished in 2015. The removal of the Wimer and Fielder dams opened about 70 miles (110 km) of stream channels in the watershed to salmon and steelhead. Wimer Dam was about 9 miles (14 km) from the mouth of Evans Creek, and Fielder Dam was further downstream.

== See also ==
- List of rivers of Oregon
