= Michael Tonry =

American criminologist (born 1945)

Michael H. Tonry
- Born: June 9, 1945 (age 81); Martinsburg, West Virginia, U.S.
- Title: McKnight Presidential Professor of Criminal Law and Policy

Academic background
- Education: Yale Law School, All Souls College, Oxford, Free University Amsterdam

Academic work
- Discipline: Criminal law, criminology
- Institutions: University of Minnesota Law School, University of Cambridge, University of Lausanne, Free University Amsterdam, Max Planck Society

Michael H. Tonry, an American criminologist, is the McKnight Presidential Professor of Criminal Law and Policy at the University of Minnesota Law School. He is also the director of the University of Minnesota's Institute on Crime and Public Policy. He has been a visiting professor of law and criminology at the University of Lausanne since 2001 and a senior fellow at the Netherlands Institute for the Study of Crime and Law Enforcement at Free University Amsterdam since 2003.

== Education ==
Tonry received his B.A. in history from the University of North Carolina at Chapel Hill in 1966 and his L.L.B. from Yale Law School in 1970. In 1994, Tonry was a visiting fellow at All Souls College, Oxford. He was awarded an honorary doctorate from Free University Amsterdam in 2010.

== Career ==
Tonry worked at the University of Chicago's Center for Studies in Criminal Justice from 1971 to 1973. From 1973 until joining the faculty of the University of Minnesota in 1990, he was on the faculty of the University of Birmingham and the University of Maryland, and also spent some of this time in private practice at different law firms, including Dechert. In 1990, he joined the University of Minnesota as the McKnight Presidential Professor of Criminal Law and Policy and the director of their Institute on Crime and Public Policy, positions he has held ever since, except for from 1999 to 2005, when he was a professor of law and public policy and director of the Institute of Criminology at Cambridge University.

== Work ==
Tonry has researched various subjects in the field of criminal law, including the increasing incarceration rate in the United States during the late 20th century. He has been described as "a leading authority on crime policy" by the New York Times' Adam Liptak. In a 2005 paper, he and David P. Farrington argued that if this increase was responsible for the declining crime rate in the United States after 1990, then one must find another explanation for the decline in the crime rate in Canada during the same time, since their incarceration rate remained flat during the same period. They also noted that during this time, Finland's incarceration rate declined, but their crime rate did not subsequently go up. In his 1995 book Malign Neglect: Race, Crime and Punishment in America, he argued that racial disparities in the criminal justice system were mainly due to differences in criminal activity among races, but also found that the proportion of people arrested for murder, rape, robbery and aggravated assault who were black had remained constant at about 45% since the mid-1970s. However, in a 2008 article in Crime and Justice with Matthew Melewski, Tonry found that a disproportionate number of racial minorities are incarcerated in part because sentencing policies have a disparate impact on those groups. In a 2009 article for Crime and Justice, he reviewed 200 years of evidence on mandatory minimums and concluded that they were unsupported by evidence.

== Views ==
Tonry wrote in The Handbook of Crime and Punishment, published in 2008, that the United States' prison sentences are far harsher than those of other countries "to which the United States would ordinarily be compared," and that English-speaking countries in general tend to be exceptionally punitive. He supports non-prison punishments for nonviolent offenders, but has acknowledged that the United States' prison population increasing to almost 2 million people (as of 1998) had reduced crime. That year, he told Eric Schlosser that "You could choose another two million Americans at random and lock them up, and that would reduce the number of crimes too."

== Professional and editorial activities ==
Tonry has been president of both the American and European Societies of Criminology. Since 1977, he has been the editor of Crime and Justice.

Professional and academic associations
Preceded by Gary LaFree	President of the American Society of Criminology; 2007	Succeeded by Robert J. Bursik
