= Green bubble =

Renewable energy economic bubble theory

The green bubble is an economic theory that the world is facing an over-investment in renewable energy and that the current levels of debts in many clean technology companies are unsustainable. As the interest rate rises many clean technology projects will go bust, a major setback for the renewable energy industry.

The term has been mentioned by several experts and articles in the late 2000s and the 2010s, such as The Green Bubble written by Per Wimmer, a Wired article discussing the fates of solar energy companies such as Solyndra, and a New Republic article by Ted Nordhaus and Michael Shellenberger covering the phenomenon.

Others disagree with the theory of a green bubble and claim the industry will face lower costs from technological improvements and economies of scale as larger companies merge with smaller and less competitive companies.

== History ==
The history of green technology, also known as renewable energy, is not quite new. According to Alexis Madrigal, author of "Powering the Dream: The History and Promise of Green Technology", a large number of windmills and solar heaters already existed in the early 20th century. Despite the fact that various green technologies have been used for centuries, the history of minor technologies is quite obscure since there are a few credible records.

From the early 21st century, there has been a large development and investment in renewable energy industry such as hydroelectricity, wind power, solar thermal, and geothermal. It is known that a "mini green bubble" had already taken place between 2005 and 2007, being terminated by the recession in 2007. The bubble made a drastic fluctuation in stock prices of companies with respect to green technology; for instance, the stock price of World Water & Solar technologies Inc., which deals with solar powered water pumps, once experienced a steep rise from 5 cents to $2.50 in 2007, subsequently facing a decline to 29 cents after the Great Recession.

However, the whole amount of global investment on renewable energy still increased until 2011, from $40 billion in 2004 to $279 billion in 2011. By contrast, the amount of investment decreased between 2011 and 2013, from $279 billion to $214 billion. This decline is said to be attributed to the improvement in the efficiency of technology costs.

== Whether a green bubble has formed ==
Are We Headed Toward a Green Bubble?, an Entrepreneur article by Julie Bennet, suggests that a small green bubble deflated during the subprime mortgage crisis in 2007 and the green market was in a pivotal time in 2010: If the economy was recovered, the green market may have emerged or simply a green bubble may have exploded. The article argued high promises from the green tech sector that may not be accomplished. For example, CleanEdge predicted that global markets for bio fuels, wind and solar energy would reach $325 billion by 2018. However, only 3.4% of total electricity expended in the U.S. came from renewal energy in 2010, while other related industries, including electric cars and solar energy, are still not competitive in their markets.

Juliet Eilperin's Wired article "Why the Clean Tech Boom Went Bust" provided some evidence regarding the fact that the green technology sector was not growing as fast as the market expected. The article argued that in 2009, the Obama administration tried to increase the investment in green technology markets, providing US$150 billion for development. Green technology markets may receive more subsidies for development than any other technology industries, Eliperin indicated. Another fact provided by Eilperin's article is the highly divided nature of the green technology market. According to Ernst & Young, the green technology market is divided into 46 different categories and It could be possible to find some specific markets with emerging bubbles.

Reid Lifset in "Beyond the Green Bubble" provided a new point: the green technology market is following the issue-attention cycle studied by Downs in "Up and down the ecology, 1972", which basically emphasized the cycle idea of a market governed by public policy. Lifset suggested that there was a green bubble before the subprime crisis, which could have provided opportunities for new investors in the market. He also argued that the green technology market will maintain its enthusiasm, mostly encouraged by government agencies.
