= Mario Wimmer =

Mario Wimmer is a cultural historian and theorist of history specializing in the history of the modern human and social sciences. Since 2022, he serves as deputy director of the Collegium Helveticum and is responsible for its academic and artistic programs. He was an ETH postdoctoral fellow with the group for science studies. After teaching in the Department of Rhetoric at the University of California, Berkeley, he helped run a research group on the history of exactitude between Basel, Zurich, and New York, also teaching history and theory of media at the University of Basel.

Born and raised in Austria, Wimmer was trained in history, sociology, psychology, and science studies in Berlin and Vienna. Before he received his PhD in history from Bielefeld University in 2010 he also worked as a curator on the history and memory of the world wars. Wimmer is considered a student of Reinhart Koselleck and Peter Schöttler, a student of Louis Althusser.

His first book Archival Bodies. A History of Historical Imagination is an investigation into the character of historical knowledge and was ranked among the ten best first books in German in 2012. Wimmer has published widely on the history of intellectual work and the historical epistemology of the humanities, co-editing special issues on History's Religion or The Promises of Exactitude. Over the past years he has published a series of chapters of an ongoing book project titled Ranke's Blindness. He is a member of the International Network for the Theory of History. He was listed among the leading theorists of history.

== Selected publications ==
Books

- Archivkörper. Eine Geschichte historischer Einbildungskraft, Konstanz University Press, 2012 (re-edited 2013).
- Enzyklopädie der Genauigkeit, ed. by Markus Krajewski, Antonia von Schöning, Mario Wimmer (Konstanz University Press, 2021).

Articles

- "Notes on a Prehistory of Poststructuralism," History of Humanities, 7 (Chicago University Press 2022) 2: 147-159 (DOI: 10.1086/721306).
- "The Last Judgment before the Last," Modern Intellectual History, 19 (Cambridge University Press 2021) 4: 1-18 (DOI:10.1017/S1479244321000305).
- "Kittsteiner's History out of Joint," Journal of the Philosophy of History, 15 (Brill 2021) 3: 409–425 (DOI:10.1163/18722636-12341469).
- "The Afterlives of Scholarship: Warburg and Cassirer," History of Humanities, 2 (Chicago University Press 2017) 1: 245-270 (DOI: 10.1086/690581).
- "On Sources. Mythical and Historical Thinking in Fin-de-Siècle Vienna," Res. Journal for Anthropology and Aesthetics, 2 (Chicago University Press 2013) 1: 108–124
- "Conceptual History: Begriffsgeschichte," in: James D. Wright (editor-in-chief), International Encyclopedia of the Social & Behavioral Sciences, 2nd edition, Vol 4. Oxford: Elsevier, 2015: 548–554.
- "Zur Ökonomie des Dilettantismus: Aby Warburgs Kredit," Neue Rundschau, 128 (2017) 3: 69–81.
