= The Biological Bulletin =

- Discipline: Biology
- Language: English
- Edited by: Kenneth M. Halanych

Publication details
- Former name: Zoological Bulletin
- History: 1897–present
- Publisher: University of Chicago Press in association with the Marine Biological Laboratory (United States)
- Frequency: Bimonthly
- Open access: After 1 yr
- Impact factor: 1.932 (2021)

Standard abbreviations
- ISO 4: Biol. Bull.

Indexing
- CODEN: BIBUBX
- ISSN: 0006-3185 (print); 1939-8697 (web)
- LCCN: a38000518
- JSTOR: 00063185
- OCLC no.: 1536426

Links
- Journal homepage

The Biological Bulletin is a peer-reviewed scientific journal covering the field of biology. The journal was established in 1897 as the Zoological Bulletin by Charles Otis Whitman and William Morton Wheeler. In 1899 the title was changed to The Biological Bulletin, and production was transferred to the Marine Biological Laboratory at Woods Hole, Massachusetts. The current editor-in-chief is Kenneth M. Halanych.

The Biological Bulletin is indexed by several bibliographic services, including Index Medicus, MEDLINE, Chemical Abstracts, Current Contents, BIOBASE, and Geo Abstracts. Six issues are published per year and all content is made freely available one year after publication. According to the Journal Citation Reports, the journal had a 2021 impact score of: 1.932. The journal ranked #54 out of 110 in Marine & Freshwater Biology journals.
