= Crime and Justice =

- Discipline: Criminal law
- Language: English
- Edited by: Michael Tonry

Publication details
- History: 1979-present
- Publisher: University of Chicago Press (United States)
- Frequency: Annual

Standard abbreviations
- ISO 4: Crime Justice

Indexing
- ISSN: 0192-3234
- JSTOR: 01923234

Links
- Journal homepage

Crime and Justice is an annual series of peer-reviewed commissioned essays on crime-related research subjects published by The University of Chicago Press. The journal was established in 1979. According to its self-description, it "explores a full range of issues concerning crime, its causes, and its cure", offering "an interdisciplinary approach to address core issues in criminology, with perspectives from biology, law, psychology, ethics, history, and sociology".
