= Wimer Bridge =

Covered bridge in Oregon, US

- Formerly listed on the U.S. National Register of Historic Places
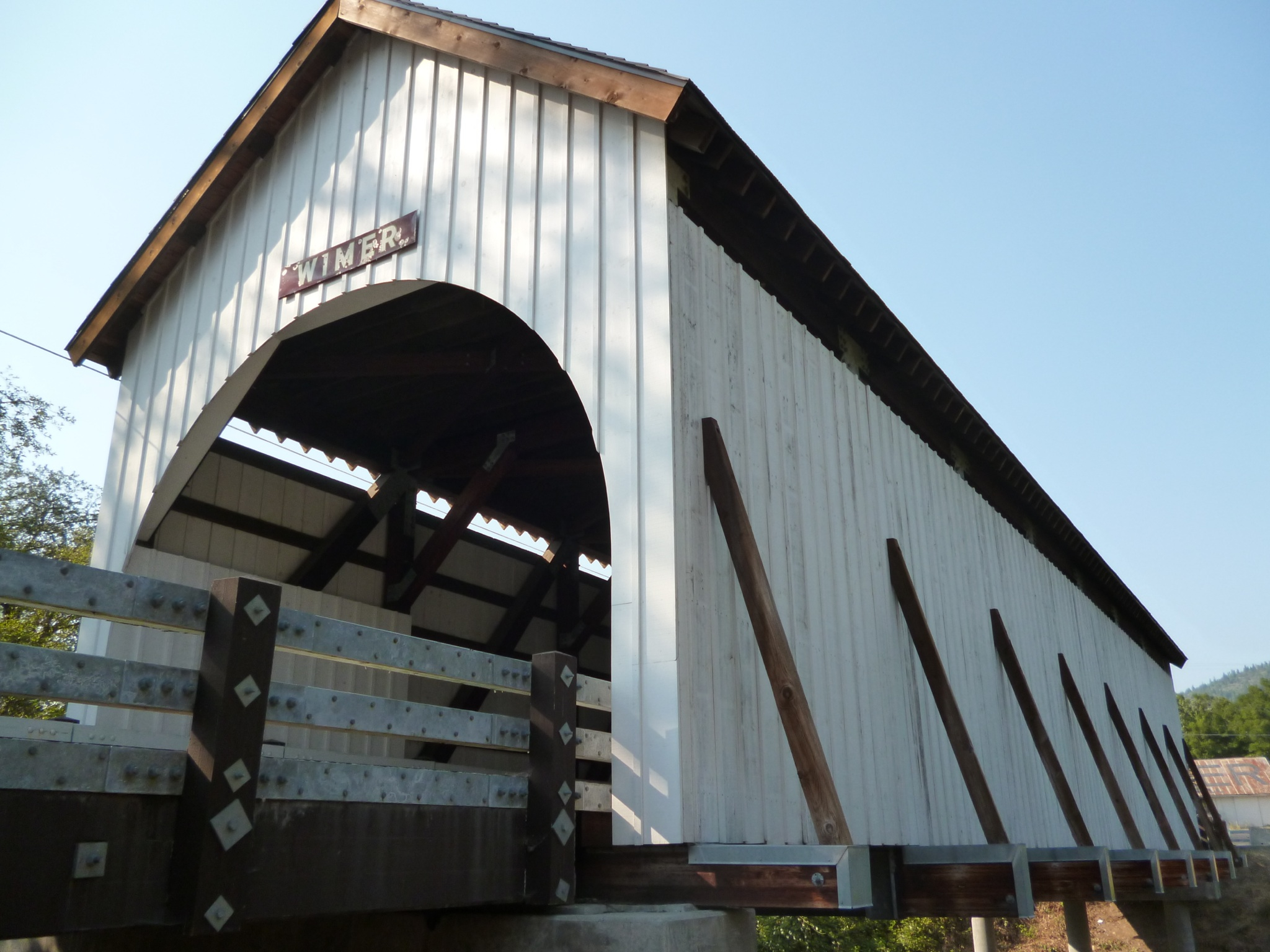
- The 2008 version of the bridge

- Location within Oregon Location within the United States
- Coordinates: 42°32′17.3″N 123°08′59.3″W
- Built: 1927 (1892) (2008)
- Built by: Hartman Brothers of Jacksonville (1927 version)
- Architectural style: Queenpost truss (1927 version)
- NRHP reference No.: 79002075

Significant dates
- Listed: November 29, 1979
- Removed from NRHP: after bridge collapse in 2003

The Wimer Bridge is a covered bridge over Evans Creek in Jackson County in the U.S. state of Oregon. The version that was listed on the National Register of Historic Places, was built in 1927. This structure, 85 feet (26 m) long, carried East Evans Creek County Road over the creek in the rural community of Wimer. The creek is a tributary of the Rogue River, which it joins at the small city of Rogue River.

An earlier covered span, built in 1892 by J. W. Osbourne, crossed the creek at this location, according to local residents and an engineering database. The 1927 bridge replaced the older span.

After the 1927 bridge deteriorated, local residents refurbished it in 1962. However, by the mid-1970s the bridge was closed after further decline. Repairs in 1985 led to reopening with an eight-ton limit, later reduced to three tons. Before further repairs were undertaken, the structure collapsed in 2003. It fell 40 feet (12 m) into the water, injuring three people who were crossing the bridge.

In 2008, with the help of federal funds and local labor, the bridge was replaced with a look-alike using trusses reinforced with metal braces, laminated beams that look like timber, concrete approaches, and industrial roofing made to resemble wooden shakes. The one-way bridge, still 17 feet (5.2 m) wide, as was the original, has a load limit of 10 tons. This version of the bridge opened to traffic in February 2008.

== See also ==
- List of bridges on the National Register of Historic Places in Oregon
- List of Oregon covered bridges
