= Per Wimmer =

Danish entrepreneur and science advocate (born 1968)

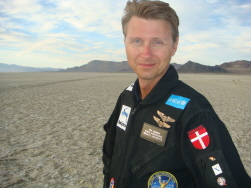
- Born: Per Thanning Wimmer; August 18, 1968 (age 57); Slagelse, Denmark
- Education: Harvard University
- Occupations: space advocacy, entrepreneur, financier, author
- Organization: Wimmer Financial
- Notable work: Wall Street (2011); The Green Bubble (2014); The Green Bubble: For Green Energy to be Truly Sustainable it Must be Commercially Sustainable (2016)
- Website: www.wimmerspace.com

Per Thanning Wimmer (born August 18, 1968) is a Danish financier, entrepreneur, author, and space advocate. He is the founder of the international corporate advisory firm Wimmer Financial and has held senior positions at Goldman Sachs, Collins Stewart, and MF Global/Man Securities. Wimmer is known for his participation in the world’s first tandem skydive above Mount Everest and for being a founding astronaut with Virgin Galactic. He has published two books, Wall Street (2011) and The Green Bubble (2014), both addressing financial markets and speculative bubbles.

== Education ==
Per Wimmer graduated in 1987 from Slagelse Gymnasium, with concentrations in mathematics and physics. In 1988, he completed the French Baccalaureate, with concentrations in philosophy and French literature.

Wimmer earned a Master of Laws degree from the University of London from 1991 to 1992. He previously received Bachelor of Arts and Master of Arts degrees in law from the University of Copenhagen between 1988 and 1993, where he also served as a student member of the Governing Board of the Faculty of Law.

He later graduated from Harvard University with a Master of Public Administration degree, concentrating in business, finance and international relations.

== Career ==
Until the end of the Jacques Delors administration in early 1996, Per Wimmer worked in the cabinet of the Vice-President of the European Commission, Henning Christophersen, in a junior capacity. The Vice-President’s responsibilities included the Monetary Union and the EU budget.

From 1996 to 1997, Per Wimmer was an associate management consultant at McKinsey & Co., with a particular focus on the media sector.

From 1998 to 2002, prior to founding his London-based corporate advisory firm, Wimmer worked in New York City and London for Goldman Sachs as an Executive Director for Institutional Sales of European equity products, where he advised Scandinavian-based financial institutions. In 2002, Wimmer left Goldman Sachs in favor of similar positions at Collins Stewart and MF Global/Man Securities, a subsidiary of Man Group, the world’s largest hedge fund.

Wimmer is the founder of Wimmer Financial, an international corporate financial advisory firm established on October 4, 2007, the 50th anniversary of the launch of Sputnik. The firm specializes in global corporate finance, equities trading, real estate, and natural resources.

=== Other occupations ===
On Oct 6, 2008, Per Wimmer participated in the world's first tandem skydive above Mount Everest, the highest point on Earth, with Ralph Mitchell as tandem master.

Wimmer is a founding astronaut with Sir Richard Branson's Virgin Galactic. In 2001, he secured a spaceflight reservation with Space Adventures. On December 4, 2008, he held a ticket to become the first astronaut to fly aboard the XCOR Lynx rocketplane, a program that was later cancelled. He was also expected to become the first Danish citizen to travel to space aboard Virgin Galactic's SpaceShipTwo, until that distinction was achieved by Andreas Mogensen in 2015.

== Publications ==
In September 2011, Per Wimmer published Wall Street, a book about financial bubbles, drawing from his career in global finance. In June 2014, he published his second book, The Green Bubble, in Sweden for the think tank Timbro, which argues that there is a green bubble in the renewable energy sector.
