= International Society for the History of Philosophy of Science =

The International Society for the History of Philosophy of Science (HOPOS) is a philosophical organization for promoting the study of the history of philosophy of science. The society promotes exchange of ideas among scholars through meetings, journals, and online. It maintains an active email listserv, HOPOS-G.

The journal HOPOS: The Journal of the International Society for the History of Philosophy of Science is published by The University of Chicago Press. The first issue appeared in 2011. The journal provides an outlet for interdisciplinary work that helps to explain the links among philosophy, science, and mathematics, along with the social, economic, and political context. The journal features articles, book reviews, and annually, an extensive essay review of the recent scholarship in a growing area of the field. The editor-in-chief is Rose-Mary Sargent of Merrimack College.

HOPOS has held international meetings every two years since 1996. The first meeting was in Roanoke, Virginia, hosted by Virginia Tech. The 2016 meeting, HOPOS 2016, will take place at the University of Minnesota, hosted by the University and by the Minnesota Center for Philosophy of Science. Previous meetings have been held in Halifax, Budapest, Vancouver, Paris, San Francisco, Montréal, Vienna, and South Bend. An archive of meeting websites can be found on the organization's website.

From 1993 to 2010, the organization produced a newsletter. Archives can be found on the website of HOPOS.

HOPOS is a member organization of International Federation of Philosophical Societies.

== Presidents ==
- Janet Folina (2013–2014)
- Warren Schmaus (2011–2012)
- Laura J. Snyder (2009–2010)
- Alan Richardson (2005–2008)
- Saul Fisher (2003–2004)
