= History of Humanities =

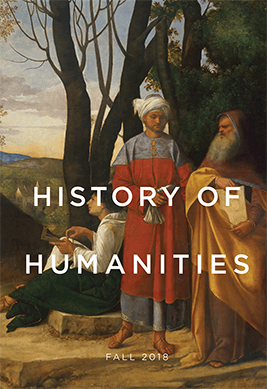
- Discipline: Humanities, Interdisciplinary
- Language: English

Publication details
- Publisher: University of Chicago Press for the Society for the History of the Humanities
- Frequency: Biannually (twice per year)

Standard abbreviations
- ISO 4: Hist. Humanit.

Indexing
- ISSN: 2379-3163 (print); 2379-3171 (web)

Links
- Journal homepage

History of Humanities is a double-blind peer-reviewed academic journal devoted to the history of the different traditions and disciplines in the humanities, across periods and cultures. Its current editors are Rens Bod, Rebecca Ruth Gould, Julia Kursell, Jaap Maat, Floris Solleveld, and Thijs Weststeijn.

The journal discusses the history of antiquarianism, archaeology, art history, classics, historiography, linguistics, literary studies, media studies, musicology, Oriental studies, philology, theater studies, and religious studies, as well as interactions between these disciplines and relevant developments in the sciences and social sciences. It publishes original research papers, thematic forums, review essays, and book reviews. It appears twice per year and is published by the University of Chicago Press like its counterpart devoted to the history of the (natural) sciences, Isis.

== Topic and agenda ==
The journal was founded on the basis of the belief that, in contrast to the history of science, the various humanities disciplines had rarely been studied in an interconnected manner, which may partly have contributed to current sentiments of a "crisis" in the humanities. In the first issue (2016), the editors state that:

“Our journal is meant to stand for the fact that scholarly practices of a type today labeled “humanities” have been an essential part of the process of knowledge making ever since human inquisitiveness sought to enhance our understanding of the world and ourselves. This long history has been studied in fruitful and illuminating ways, but the focus has been on either the natural sciences or on single disciplines within the humanities, such as history writing and linguistics. The fundamental contribution of the humanities to the intricate web of knowledge that scholars, thinkers, and researchers have spun in the course of several millennia has thus been poorly recognized and is consequently undervalued. We intend to redress the imbalance in the historiography of the search for knowledge that mankind has been engaged in for so long. A more balanced picture, we believe, will show that the ways we arrive at knowledge are complex, varied, and unpredictable and often involve the transmission of methods and insights from one field of investigation to another."

In Volume 10 (2025), the editors added: "We must recognize that the challenges of our time demand a renewed commitment to the humanities and their guiding principles. We firmly believe that the humanities play an indispensable role in addressing humanity’s challenges, from expanding artificial intelligence and climate migration to autocratic intellectual clampdown. Understanding their past will prepare us better for our future."

The journal is the brainchild of the Society for the History of the Humanities which also organizes a series of conferences, “The Making of the Humanities,” in Amsterdam (2008, 2010, 2018), Rome (2012, 2014), Baltimore (2016), Oxford (2017), Cape Town (2019), Barcelona (2021), Pittsburgh (2022), Lund (2024), and Torún (2026). It has earlier published a trilogy, The Making of the Humanities (Amsterdam University Press), which tested the ground for the founding of the journal in 2016.

The journal devotes special issues to classic texts in the humanities (including the African Humanities). Thematic issues have addressed, among others: scholarly forgetting; the scholarly self; libraries as laboratories; exactitude; historical fiction; knowledge circulation; materials and techniques in art history; just intonation in music; the colonial humanities; and the inhumanities.

== Indexing ==
Articles that appear in History of Humanities are indexed in the following abstracting and indexing services:

- Ulrich's Periodicals Directory
- Ulrichsweb
- EBSCOHOST
- Humanities International Index
- Humanities Source Ultimate
- TOC Premier

{{History Journals}}
