= American Political Thought =

- Discipline: Political science
- Language: English
- Edited by: Benjamin Kleinerman and Thomas Merrill

Publication details
- History: 2012–present
- Publisher: University of Chicago Press for the American Political Thought organized section of the American Political Science Association (United States)
- Frequency: Quarterly

Standard abbreviations
- ISO 4: Am. Political Thought

Indexing
- ISSN: 2161-1580 (print); 2161-1599 (web)
- JSTOR: amerpolithou
- OCLC no.: 715271444

Links
- Journal homepage; Online access; Online archive

American Political Thought is a quarterly peer-reviewed academic journal focusing on American "ideas, institutions, and culture." It is published by the University of Chicago Press and sponsored by the American Political Thought organized section of the American Political Science Association. The journal bridges "the gap between historical, empirical, and theoretical research." It was established in 2012, and is "the only peer-reviewed academic journal exclusively devoted to its subject." The founding editor-in-chief was Michael Zuckert (University of Notre Dame). The current editors are Benjamin Kleinerman (Baylor University) and Thomas Merrill (American University); Danielle Charette (University of Virginia) serves as the book review editor, Sunyata Courie (American University) serves as the managing editor, and Matthew Reising (Baylor University) serves as an editorial assistant.

== Abstracting and indexing ==
The journal is abstracted and indexed in the Emerging Sources Citation Index, EBSCO databases, and Scopus.
