= Wimer, Oregon =

Unincorporated community in the state of Oregon, United States

- Census-designated place
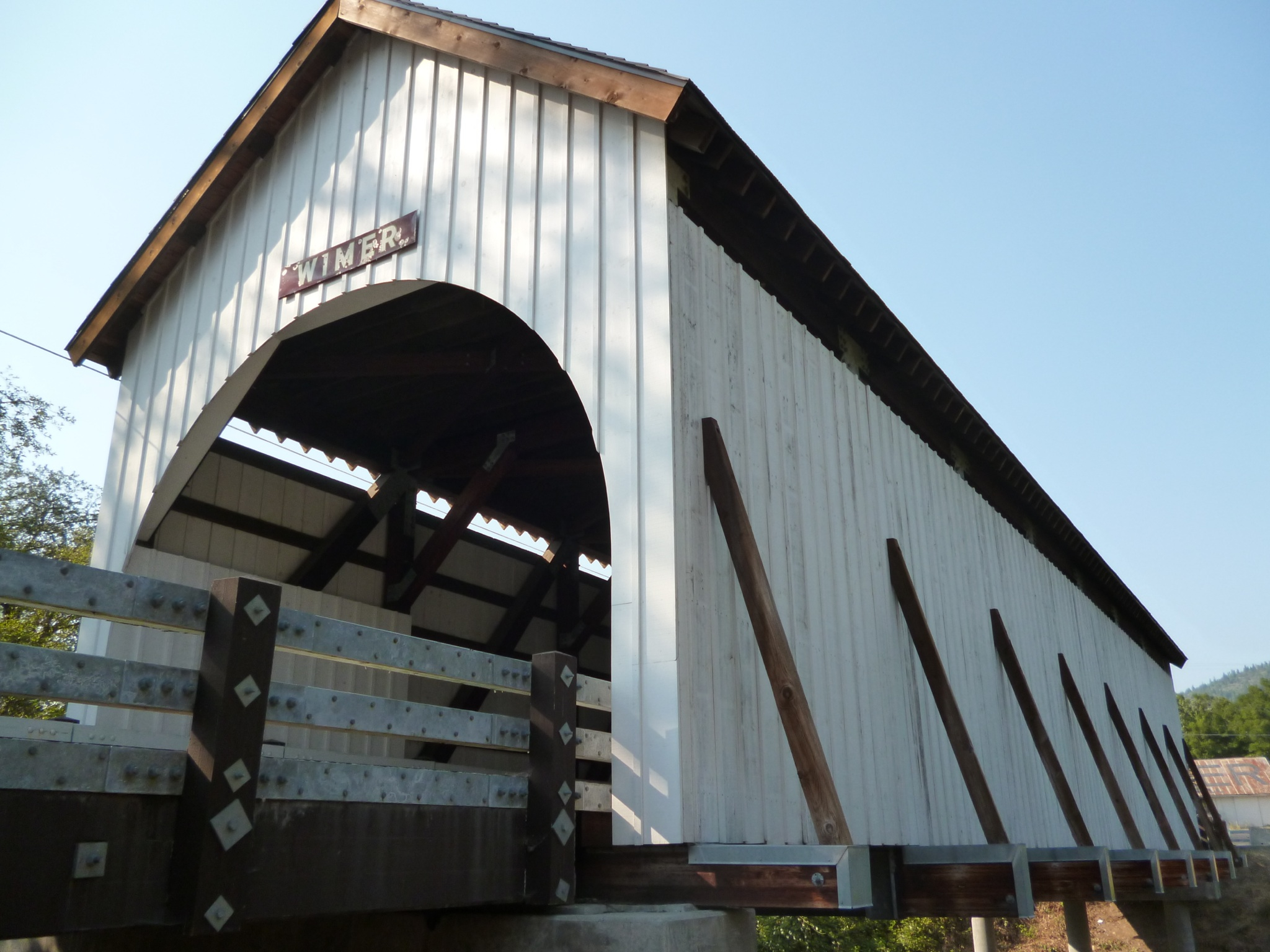
- Wimer Bridge over Evans Creek

- Location within Oregon Location within the United States
- Coordinates: 42°32′58″N 123°08′26″W
- Country: United States
- State: Oregon
- County: Jackson

Area
  - Total: 4.96 sq mi (12.84 km^{2})
  - Land: 4.96 sq mi (12.84 km^{2})
  - Water: 0 sq mi (0.00 km^{2})
- Elevation: 1,194 ft (364 m)

Population (2020)
  - Total: 690
  - Density: 139.2/sq mi (53.74/km^{2})
- Time zone: UTC-8 (Pacific (PST))
  - Summer (DST): UTC-7 (PDT)
- ZIP code: 97537
- Area codes: 458 and 541
- FIPS code: 41-82850
- GNIS feature ID: 2611786

Wimer is an unincorporated community and census-designated place (CDP) in Jackson County, Oregon, United States. As of the 2020 census, Wimer had a population of 690. Wimer lies along Evans Creek north of the city of Rogue River.

The community was named for a relative of William Wimer, who edited a newspaper in Grants Pass in 1886–87. Grants Pass is about 17 miles (27 km) southwest of Wimer. William Wimer was also said to have helped establish a post office in Wimer, which remained open until 1909. Simon E. Simpkins was the first postmaster.

Wimer Bridge is a covered bridge that crosses Evans Creek in Wimer. It replaced a 1927 version of the bridge that collapsed into the creek in 2003. In 2008, with the help of federal funds and local labor, the bridge was replaced with a look-alike using stronger materials. The one-way bridge, still 17 feet (5.2 m) wide, as was the original, has a load limit of 10 tons. This version of the bridge opened to traffic in February 2008.

== Demographics ==
Historical population
Census	Pop.	Note	%±
2020	690		—
U.S. Decennial Census
